= 2014 Alabama elections =

A general election was held in the U.S. state of Alabama on November 4, 2014. All of Alabama's executive officers were up for election as well as a United States Senate seat, and all of Alabama's seven seats in the United States House of Representatives.

Primary elections were held on June 3, 2014, for offices that need to nominate candidates. Primary runoffs, necessary if no candidate won a majority of the vote, were held on July 15.

== Governor ==
Incumbent Republican Governor Robert J. Bentley, who had served in the office since January 17, 2011, ran for re-election to a second term as governor.

He defeated former Morgan County Commissioner Stacy Lee George and retired software company owner and candidate for Mayor of Scottsboro in 2012 Bob Starkey in the Republican primary.

In the Democratic primary, former U.S. Representative Parker Griffith defeated businessman and former professional baseball player Kevin Bass.

2014 Alabama gubernatorial election
Party	Candidate	Votes	%
Republican	Robert J. Bentley (incumbent)	750,231	63.56
Democratic	Parker Griffith	427,787	36.24
Write-in		2,395	0.20
Total votes		1,180,413	100

== Lieutenant governor ==
Incumbent Republican Lieutenant Governor Kay Ivey, who had served in the office since January 17, 2011, ran for re-election to a second term.

She defeated state representative James C. Fields in the November general election.

2014 Alabama lieutenant gubernatorial election
Party	Candidate	Votes	%
Republican	Kay Ivey (incumbent)	738,090	63.23
Democratic	James C. Fields	428,007	36.67
Write-in		1,146	0.10
Total votes		1,167,243	100

== Attorney General ==
2014 Alabama Attorney General election
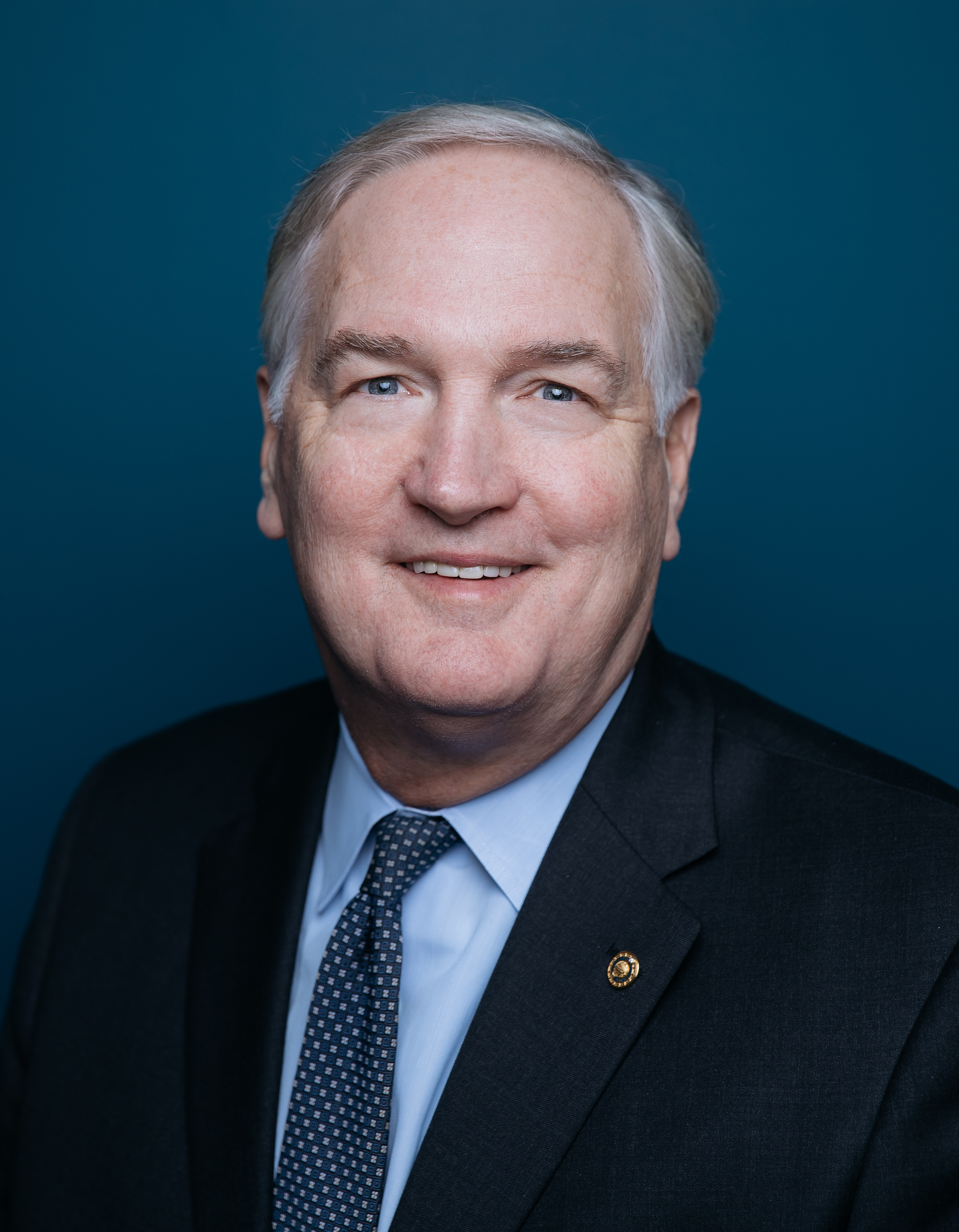

Nominee	Luther Strange	Joe Hubbard
Party	Republican	Democratic
Popular vote	681,973	483,771
Percentage	58.39%	41.42%
- County results Strange: 50–60% 60–70% 70–80% 80–90% Hubbard: 50–60% 60–70% 70–80% 80–90%
Attorney General before election
Luther Strange
Republican
Elected Attorney General
Luther Strange
Republican

Incumbent Republican Attorney General Luther Strange, who had served in the office since January 17, 2011, ran for re-election to a second term.

=== Republican nominee ===
- Luther Strange, incumbent.

=== Democratic nominee ===
- Joe Hubbard, state representative and great-grandson of former U.S. Senator J. Lister Hill.

=== General election ===
==== Endorsements ====
Luther Strange (R)

Politicians

- Jeff Sessions, U.S. Senator from Alabama.

Organizations

- NRA Political Victory Fund
- Alabama Civil Justice Reform Committee
- Alabama Association of Realtors
- Alabama Retail Association
- Alabama Farmers Federation
- Alabama Patriots
- Conservative Christians of Alabama
Joe Hubbard (D)

Organizations

- Alabama Voter's Coalition
- International Brotherhood of Boilermakers

==== Results ====
2014 Alabama Attorney General election
Party	Candidate	Votes	%
Republican	Luther Strange (incumbent)	681,973	58.39
Democratic	Joe Hubbard	483,771	41.42
Write-in		2,157	0.19
Total votes		1,167,901	100

== Secretary of State ==
2014 Alabama Secretary of State election
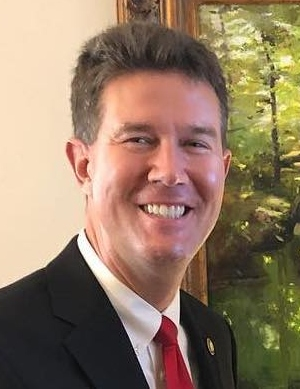

Nominee	John Merrill	Lula Albert-Kaigler
Party	Republican	Democratic
Popular vote	733,298	406,373
Percentage	64.27%	35.62%
- County results Merrill: 50–60% 60–70% 70–80% 80–90% Albert-Kaigler: 50–60% 60–70% 70–80% 80–90%
Secretary of State before election
James R. Bennett
Republican
Elected Secretary of State
John Merrill
Republican

Incumbent Republican Secretary of State James R. Bennett, who had served in the office since July 31, 2013, did not run for re-election, per the terms of his appointment. Bennett, who had previously served as secretary of state from 1993 to 2003, was appointed to the office following the resignation of Beth Chapman.

=== Republican primary ===
==== Candidates ====
- Reese McKinney, former Montgomery County probate judge.
- James Perdue, Crenshaw County probate judge.
- John Merrill, state representative.

==== First round endorsements ====
John Merrill

Organizations

- Alabama Association of Realtors
- Business Council of Alabama
- Alabama Retail Association
- Alabama Farmers Federation
- Young Republicans of Northeast Alabama

==== First round polling ====
Poll source	Date(s) administered	Sample size	Margin of error	Reese McKinney	John Merrill	James Perdue	Undecided
Cygnal	May 29–30, 2014	1,217	± 2.81%	21%	19%	17%	43%
Cygnal	May 19–20, 2014	1,327	± 2.69%	12%	8%	9%	71%

==== First round results ====
Republican primary results
Party	Candidate	Votes	%
Republican	John Merrill	143,960	39.57
Republican	Reese McKinney	139,763	38.42
Republican	Jim Perdue	80,050	22.01
Total votes		363,773	100

==== Runoff endorsements ====
John Merrill

Individuals

- Wimp Sanderson, former college basketball coach.

Organizations

- Home Builders Association of Alabama
- NRA Political Victory Fund
- Manufacture Alabama

State officials

- Dan Williams, state representative from the 5th district.
- Phil Williams, state representative from the 6th district.
- Mike Ball, state representative from the 10th district.
- Jim Patterson, state representative from the 21st district.
- Wayne Johnson, state representative from the 22nd district.
- Mac McCutcheon, state representative from the 25th district.
Reese McKinney

Individuals

- Ray Scott, founder of the Bass Anglers Sportsman Society.

County officials

- Jim Perdue, Crenshaw County probate judge and Republican candidate in the first round.
- Al Booth, Autauga County probate judge.

Organizations

- Conservative Christians of Alabama

==== Runoff polling ====
Poll source	Date(s) administered	Sample size	Margin of error	Reese McKinney	John Merrill	Undecided
Cygnal	July 7–8, 2014	821	± 3.42%	23%	24%	53%

==== Runoff results ====
Republican primary runoff results
Party	Candidate	Votes	%
Republican	John Merrill	108,740	53.14
Republican	Reese McKinney	95,877	46.86
Total votes		204,617	100

=== Democratic nominee ===
- Lula Albert-Kaigler, self-employed business consultant and candidate for Alabama's 1st congressional district in 2013.

=== General election ===
==== Endorsements ====
John Merrill (R)

Organizations

- International Brotherhood of Boilermakers
Lula Albert-Kaigler (D)

Organizations

- Alabama Voter's Coalition

==== Results ====
2014 Alabama Secretary of State election
Party	Candidate	Votes	%
Republican	John Merrill	733,298	64.27
Democratic	Lula Albert-Kaigler	406,373	35.62
Write-in		1,271	0.11
Total votes		1,140,942	100
Republican hold			

== State Auditor ==
2014 Alabama State Auditor election
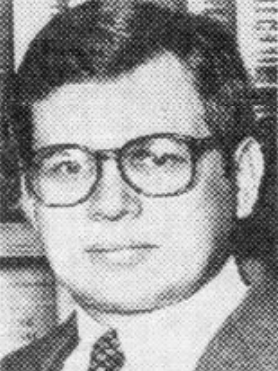

Nominee	Jim Zeigler	Miranda Joseph
Party	Republican	Democratic
Popular vote	716,122	420,843
Percentage	62.93%	36.98%
- County results Zeigler: 50–60% 60–70% 70–80% 80–90% Joseph: 50–60% 60–70% 70–80% 80–90%
State Auditor before election
Samantha Shaw
Republican
Elected State Auditor
Jim Zeigler
Republican

Incumbent Republican State Auditor Samantha Shaw, who had served in the office since 2007, was term-limited and not eligible to run for re-election to a third term.

=== Republican primary ===
==== Confirmed candidates ====
- Dale Peterson, farmer and candidate for Commissioner of Agriculture and Industries in 2010.
- Hobbie Sealy, retired Air Force Colonel.
- Adam Thompson, deputy chief of staff of the Secretary of State of Alabama.
- Jim Zeigler, attorney and former Alabama Public Service Commissioner.

==== Disqualified ====
- Ray Bryan, attorney.

==== First round endorsements ====
Jim Zeigler

Organizations

- Alabama Republican Assembly
- Conservative Christians of Alabama
Adam Thompson

State officials

- Beth Chapman, former State Auditor and Secretary of State of Alabama.

Organizations

- Alabama Association of Realtors
- Alabama Farmers Federation
- Alabama Retail Association
- Business Council of Alabama
- Young Republicans of Northeast Alabama

==== First round polling ====
Poll source	Date(s) administered	Sample size	Margin of error	Dale Peterson	Hobbie Sealy	Adam Thompson	Jim Zeigler	Undecided
Cygnal	May 29–30, 2014	1,217	± 2.81%	17%	5%	10%	24%	45%
Cygnal	May 19–20, 2014	1,324	± 2.69%	11%	3%	5%	20%	61%

==== First round results ====
Republican primary results
Party	Candidate	Votes	%
Republican	Jim Zeigler	164,002	47.07
Republican	Dale Peterson	84,828	24.35
Republican	Adam Thompson	64,688	18.57
Republican	Hobbie Sealy	34,910	10.02
Total votes		348,428	100

==== Runoff endorsements ====
Jim Zeigler

Organizations

- Alabama Farmers Federation

==== Runoff polling ====
Poll source	Date(s) administered	Sample size	Margin of error	Dale Peterson	Jim Zeigler	Undecided
Cygnal	July 7–8, 2014	821	± 3.42%	22%	31%	48%

==== Runoff results ====
Republican primary runoff results
Party	Candidate	Votes	%
Republican	Jim Zeigler	131,637	64.92
Republican	Dale Peterson	71,141	35.08
Total votes		202,778	100

=== Democratic nominee ===
- Miranda Joseph, certified internal auditor and Democratic nominee in 2010.

=== General election ===
==== Endorsements ====
Miranda Joseph (D)

Organizations

- Alabama Voter's Coalition
- International Brotherhood of Boilermakers

==== Results ====
2014 Alabama State Auditor election
Party	Candidate	Votes	%
Republican	Jim Zeigler	716,122	62.93
Democratic	Miranda Joseph	420,843	36.98
Write-in		1,010	0.09
Total votes		1,137,975	100
Republican hold			

== State Treasurer ==
2014 Alabama State Treasurer election
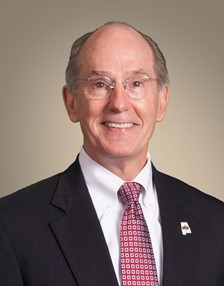
Nominee	Young Boozer
Party	Republican
Popular vote	748,876
Percentage	98.01%
- County results Boozer: >90%
Treasurer before election
Young Boozer
Republican
Elected Treasurer
Young Boozer
Republican

Incumbent Republican State Treasurer Young Boozer, who had served in the office since January 17, 2011, ran for re-election to a second term. Democrat Joe Cottle had initially announced his candidacy but later withdrew from the race.

=== Republican nominee ===
- Young Boozer, incumbent.

=== General election ===
==== Endorsements ====
Young Boozer (R)

Organizations

- Alabama Association of Realtors
- Alabama Retail Association
- Alabama Farmers Federation

==== Results ====
2014 Alabama State Treasurer election
Party	Candidate	Votes	%
Republican	Young Boozer (incumbent)	748,876	98.01%
Write-in		15,224	1.99%
Total votes		764,100	100%

== Commissioner of Agriculture and Industries ==
2014 Alabama Commissioner of Agriculture and Industries election

Nominee	John McMillan	Doug Smith
Party	Republican	Democratic
Popular vote	734,428	400,299
Percentage	64.67%	35.25%
- County results McMillan: 50–60% 60–70% 70–80% 80–90% Smith: 50–60% 60–70% 70–80% 80–90%
Commissioner before election
John McMillan
Republican
Elected Commissioner
John McMillan
Republican

Incumbent Republican Commissioner of Agriculture and Industries John McMillan, who had served in the office since January 17, 2011, ran for re-election to a second term.

=== Republican nominee ===
- John McMillan, incumbent.

=== Democratic nominee ===
- Doug Smith, real estate businessman.

=== General election ===
==== Endorsements ====
John McMillan (R)

Organizations

- Alabama Association of Realtors
- Alabama Retail Association
- Alabama Farmers Federation
- Business Council of Alabama
Doug Smith (D)

Organizations

- Alabama Voter's Coalition

==== Results ====
2014 Alabama Commissioner of Agriculture and Industries election
Party	Candidate	Votes	%
Republican	John McMillan (incumbent)	734,428	64.67
Democratic	Doug Smith	400,299	35.25
Write-in		970	0.08
Total votes		1,135,697	100

== Public Service Commission ==
Both the Associate Commissioners on the Alabama Public Service Commission were up for election. Republican Jeremy Oden, who was appointed to the commission by Governor Bentley in December 2012, was running for election to a first full term. Republican Terry Dunn, who was first elected in 2010, was running for re-election to a second term.

=== Place 1 ===
==== Republican Primary ====
===== Candidates =====
- Kathy Peterson, retired businesswoman and wife of Republican candidate for state auditor Dale Peterson.
- Jeremy Oden, incumbent.

===== Endorsements =====
Jeremy Oden

Organizations

- Alabama Association of Realtors
- Alabama Retail Association
- NRA Political Victory Fund
- Alabama Farmers Federation
- Alabama Coal Association
- Manufacture Alabama
Kathy Peterson

Organizations

- Conservative Christians of Alabama
- Alabama Republican Assembly
- Common Sense Campaign of Alabama

===== Polling =====
Poll source	Date(s) administered	Sample size	Margin of error	Jeremy Oden	Kathy Peterson	Undecided
Cygnal	May 29–30, 2014	1,217	± 2.81%	36%	26%	39%
Cygnal	May 19–20, 2014	1,324	± 2.69%	20%	17%	64%

===== Primary results =====
Primary results by county Oden: 50–60%; 60–70%; 70–80%; Peterson: 50–60%; 60–70%; 70–80%

Republican primary results
Party	Candidate	Votes	%
Republican	Jeremy Oden (incumbent)	188,971	52.39
Republican	Kathy Peterson	171,755	47.61
Total votes		360,726	100

==== General election ====
2014 Alabama Public Service Commission Place 1 election
Party	Candidate	Votes	%
Republican	Jeremy Oden (incumbent)	735,298	98.00
Write-in		15,043	2.00
Total votes		750,341	100

=== Place 2 ===
==== Republican primary ====
===== Candidates =====
- Jonathan Barbee, media company owner and former interim press secretary for the Alabama Republican Party.
- Chris "Chip" Beeker, former Greene County Commissioner.
- Phillip Brown, chairman of the Alabama Minority GOP.
- Terry Dunn, incumbent.

===== First round endorsements =====
Terry Dunn

Organizations

- Conservative Christians of Alabama
Chris "Chip" Beeker

Organizations

- Alabama Association of Realtors
- Alabama Retail Association
- Alabama Farmers Federation
- Alabama Coal Association
- Manufacture Alabama
Jonathan Barbee

Organizations

- Young Republicans of Northeast Alabama
- Small Business Alabama

===== First round polling =====
Poll source	Date(s) administered	Sample size	Margin of error	Terry Dunn	Jonathan Barbee	Chris "Chip" Beeker	Phillip Brown	Undecided
Cygnal	May 29–30, 2014	1,217	± 2.81%	13%	12%	23%	7%	45%
Cygnal	May 19–20, 2014	1,324	± 2.69%	10%	6%	17%	5%	63%

===== First round results =====
Republican primary results
Party	Candidate	Votes	%
Republican	Chris "Chip" Beeker	133,606	39.01
Republican	Terry Dunn (incumbent)	111,404	32.53
Republican	Jonathan Barbee	54,341	15.87
Republican	Phillip Brown	43,097	12.59
Total votes		342,448	100

===== Runoff endorsements =====
Chris "Chip" Beeker

Individuals

- Pat Boone, actor and singer-songwriter.

Politicians

- Haley Barbour, former Governor of Mississippi.
- Jonathan Barbee, former interim press secretary for the Alabama Republican Party and candidate in the Republican primary.
- Phillip Brown, Alabama Minority GOP chairman and candidate in the Republican primary.

===== Runoff polling =====
Poll source	Date(s) administered	Sample size	Margin of error	Terry Dunn	Chris "Chip" Beeker	Undecided
Cygnal	July 7–8, 2014	821	± 3.42%	22%	31%	47%

===== Runoff results =====
Republican primary runoff results
Party	Candidate	Votes	%
Republican	Chris "Chip" Beeker	119,122	59.34
Republican	Terry Dunn (incumbent)	81,626	40.66
Total votes		200,748	100

==== General election ====
2014 Alabama Public Service Commission Place 2 election
Party	Candidate	Votes	%
Republican	Chris "Chip" Beeker	735,957	97.99
Write-in		15,094	2.01
Total votes		751,051	100
Republican hold			

== State Judiciary ==
One seat on the Supreme Court of Alabama and four seats on the state appellate courts - two on the Alabama Court of Civil Appeals and two on the Alabama Court of Criminal Appeals - were up for election in 2014. All five Republican incumbents were re-elected without having to face an opponent.

== State Senate ==
All 35 seats of the Alabama Senate were up for election in 2014.

Prior to the election the Republicans held a 23–11 edge; after the election the Republicans regained control 26–8 with 1 independent going to the GOP side.

== State House of Representatives ==
All 105 seats in the Alabama House of Representatives were up for election in 2014.

Prior to the election the Republicans had a 66–37 edge; after the election the Republicans regained control 72–33.

== United States Senate ==
Incumbent Republican senator Jeff Sessions ran for re-election to a fourth term. No other candidates filed before the deadline and so he was unopposed in the primary and general elections.

2014 United States Senate election in Alabama
Party	Candidate	Votes	%
Republican	Jeff Sessions (incumbent)	795,606	97.25
Write-in		22,484	2.75
Total votes		818,090	100

== United States House of Representatives ==
All of Alabama's seven seats in the United States House of Representatives were up for election in 2014.

== Ballot measures ==
Six statewide ballot measures appeared on the ballot in Alabama - one in July and five in November. All of them were approved by the voters.

2014 Alabama ballot measures
Name	Description	Votes				Type
Name	Description	Yes	%	No	%	Type
Amendment 1 (July)	Ends the assessment refund for cotton producers who do not participate in the assessment program for cotton checkoff.	158,356	67.08	77,725	32.92	Legislatively referred constitutional amendment
Amendment 1 (November)	Forbids the state's recognition of laws violating its policies, including all foreign law.	696,141	72.33	266,272	27.67	Legislatively referred constitutional amendment
Amendment 2	Increases the amount of general obligation bonds authorized by $50 million.	479,026	50.48	469,998	49.52	Legislatively referred constitutional amendment
Amendment 3	Protects the right to bear arms in the state and require strict scrutiny of any restriction on the right.	736,462	72.50	279,397	27.50	Legislatively referred constitutional amendment
Amendment 4	Requires a two-thirds majority vote by the Alabama Legislature to increase local education expenditure by $50,000 or more.	535,308	56.24	416,460	43.76	Legislatively referred constitutional amendment
Amendment 5	Clarifies that the people in Alabama have the right to hunt, fish, and harvest wildlife subject to reasonable regulations.	789,777	79.84	199,483	20.16	Legislatively referred constitutional amendment
Source: Alabama Secretary of State

Results by county

Amendment 1 (July) results by county
Yes:
- 50–60%
- 60–70%
- 70–80%
- 80–90%

Amendment 1 (November) results by county
Yes:
- 50–60%
- 60–70%
- 70–80%
- 80–90%
No:
- 60–70%

Amendment 2 results by county
Yes:
- 50–60%
- 60–70%
- 70–80%
No:
- 50–60%
- 60–70%

Amendment 3 results by county
Yes:
- 50–60%
- 60–70%
- 70–80%
- 80–90%
No:
- 60–70%

Amendment 4 results by county
Yes:
- 50–60%
- 60–70%
- 70–80%
No:
- 50–60%

Amendment 5 results by county
Yes:
- 60–70%
- 70–80%
- 80–90%
