= Government of Alabama =

State government of the US state of Alabama

- The Great Seal of the State of Alabama
- Part of: United States of America
- Constitution: Constitution of Alabama

Legislative branch
- Name: Legislature
- Type: Bicameral
- Meeting place: Alabama State Capitol
- Upper house
- Name: Senate
- Presiding officer: Will Ainsworth, President
- Lower house
- Name: House of Representatives
- Presiding officer: Nathaniel Ledbetter, Speaker

Executive branch
- Head of state and government
- Title: Governor
- Currently: Kay Ivey
- Appointer: Election
- Cabinet
- Name: Cabinet
- Leader: Governor
- Deputy leader: Lieutenant Governor
- Headquarters: Alabama State Capitol

Judicial branch
- Name: Judiciary of Alabama
- Courts: Courts of Alabama
- Supreme Court of Alabama
- Chief judge: Tom Parker
- Seat: Montgomery

The government of Alabama is organized under the provisions of the 2022 Constitution of Alabama. Like other states within the United States, Alabama's government is divided into executive, judicial, and legislative branches. Also like any other state, these three branches serve a specific purpose in terms of power.

== Executive branch ==
The Alabama Executive branch consists of the governor of Alabama, the lieutenant governor of Alabama, the Governor's Cabinet, several popularly elected executive officials, and the executive staff. The Cabinet consists of the heads of 25 different departments ranging from the Chief of Staff to the head of the Alabama Department of Conservation and Natural Resources.

Elected Executive Officials in Alabama
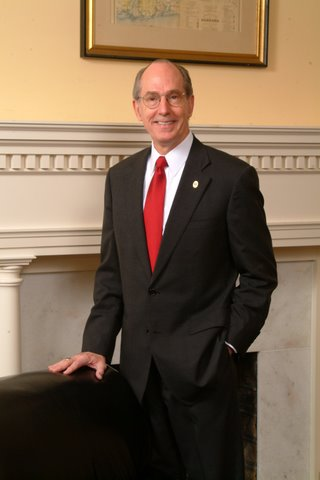
Young Boozer (R)
State Treasurer

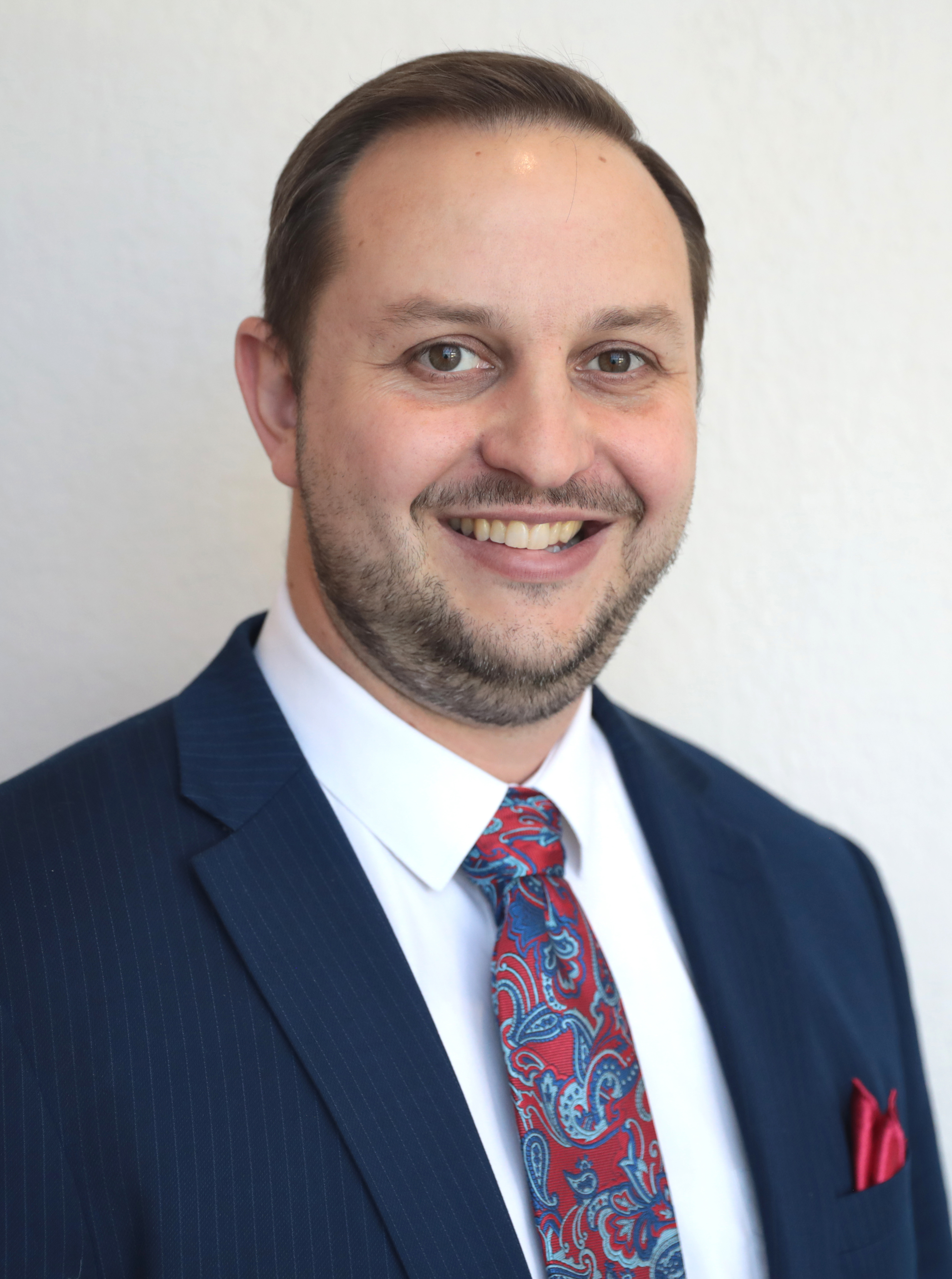
Andrew Sorrell (R)
State Auditor

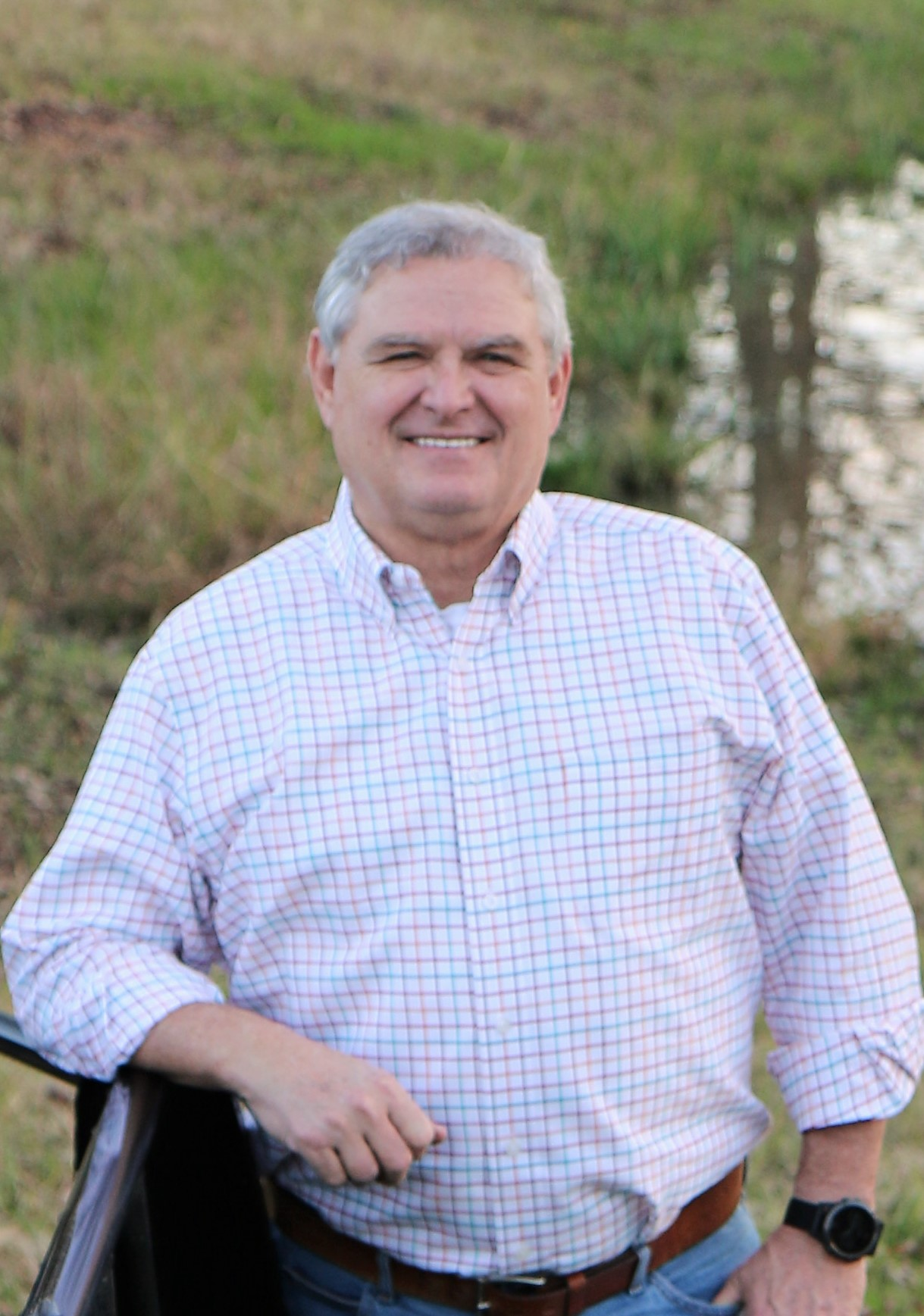
Rick Pate (R)
State Commissioner of Agriculture and Industries

=== Governor ===
The governor is the chief executive of the state's government. The governor is responsible for upholding the Alabama Constitution and executing state law. The governor is elected by popular election every four years. The constitution limits the governor to two consecutive terms, but there is no limit on the total number of terms one may serve, so long as no more than two are ever consecutive. George Wallace holds the record as the longest-serving governor in Alabama history with 16 years of service.

The governor also is commander-in-chief of the state's military forces, which consist of the Alabama Army National Guard and Alabama Air National Guard, which are part of the National Guard of the United States. As commander-in-chief, the governor may call out the state's military forces to preserve the public peace when it is not in active service of the United States. The governor may also call upon them to render aid during natural disasters or other times when the governor may deem their services to be required.

The governor of Alabama has power to veto laws passed by the state legislature (see below). However, in contrast to the practice in most states (and the federal government) that requires the legislature to garner a two-thirds majority to override an executive veto, the Alabama constitution requires only a majority within both legislative houses to accomplish this. The governor also possesses the power to pardon convicted criminals, except in cases of impeachment.

At least once every legislative session, the governor is required to deliver an address to the Alabama Legislature, referred to as the "State of the State address." This address encompasses the condition and operation of the state government, and may also suggest new legislation for the legislature's consideration.

The governor of Alabama is Republican Kay Ivey, who has served since 2017.

=== Lieutenant governor ===
They establish all special and standing committees, appoints all chairpersons and members. The current lieutenant governor is Will Ainsworth since 2019.

=== Independent executive officials ===
Along with the governor and the lieutenant governor, the executive branch is composed of five other popularly elected officials, as well as the superintendent of education, who is chosen by the state school board:

- Attorney General of Alabama Steve Marshall
- State Auditor of Alabama Andrew Sorrell
- Secretary of State of Alabama Wes Allen
- State Treasurer of Alabama Young Boozer
- Alabama Superintendent of Education Eric Mackey, Ed.D.
- Alabama Commissioner of Agriculture and Industries Rick Pate

All of the independent executive officials serve four-year that run concurrent with that of the governor, who is currently Kay Ivey.

=== Cabinet members (as of 2023) ===
- Administrator of the Alcoholic Beverage Control Board: Curtis Stewart
- Superintendent of State Banking Department: Michael E. Hill
- Secretary of the Alabama Department of Early Childhood Education: Ami Brooks
- Secretary of Commerce: Ellen McNair
- Commissioner of the Department of Conservation and Natural Resources: Chris Blankenship
- Commissioner of the Department of Corrections: Greg Lovelace
- Director of the Alabama Department of Economic and Community Affairs: Kenneth Boswell
- Director of the Emergency Management Agency: Jeff Smitherman
- Director of Finance: Bill Poole
- Commissioner of the Department of Human Resources: Nancy Buckner
- Commissioner of Insurance: Mark Fowler
- Director of the Office of Information Technology: Marty Redden
- Secretary of the Department of Workforce: Greg Reed
- Secretary of Law Enforcement: Hal Taylor
- Commissioner of the Alabama Medicaid Agency: Bo Offord
- Alabama Department of Mental Health: Kim Boswell
- Adjutant General of the Alabama National Guard: Maj. Gen. David Pritchett
- Director of Minority Affairs: Stacia Robinson
- Commissioner of the Department of Revenue: Mary Martin Mitchell
- Commissioner of the Department of Senior Services: Jean Brown
- Director of the Department of Transportation: John R. Cooper
- Secretary of Information Technology: Daniel Urquhart

== Judicial branch ==
=== Supreme Court ===
The Supreme Court of Alabama is composed of a chief justice, Sarah Hicks Stewart, and eight associate justices (Tommy Bryan, William B. Sellers, Michael F. Bolin, Tom Parker, Brad Mendheim, Greg Shaw, James Allan Main, and Alisa Kelli Wise). The Clerk of Court is Julia Jordan Weller As the highest state court, the Supreme Court has both judicial and administrative responsibilities. The court is housed in the Heflin-Torbert Judicial Building.

The Supreme Court has authority to review decisions rendered by the other courts of the state. It also has authority to determine certain legal matters over which no other court has jurisdiction, and to issue such orders as may prove necessary to carry out its general superintendence over the court system in Alabama. The Supreme Court of Alabama has exclusive jurisdiction over all appeals where the amount in controversy exceeds $50,000, as well as appeals from the Alabama Public Service Commission.

The chief justice is the administrative head of the state's judicial system. The Supreme Court may make rules governing administration, practice, and procedure for all Alabama courts. Under this authority, uniform rules of practice and procedure and judicial administration have been adopted to eliminate many of the technicalities which cause delay in the trial courts, and needless reversals in the appellate courts.

=== Court of the Judiciary ===
A "Court of the Judiciary" is created under Alabama law, consisting of one judge of an appellate court (other than the Supreme Court), who shall be selected by the Supreme Court and shall serve as Chief Judge of the Court of the Judiciary. In addition, two judges of the circuit court are to be appointed to this body, who shall be selected by the Circuit Judges' Association; together with one district judge, who shall be selected by the District Judges' Association. Other members of the Court of the Judiciary are: two members of the state bar, who shall be selected by the governing body of the Alabama State Bar; three persons (as of 2005) who are not lawyers who shall be appointed by the Governor; and one person appointed by the Lieutenant Governor. Members appointed by the Governor and Lieutenant Governor shall be subject to Senate confirmation before serving.

The Court of the Judiciary is convened to hear complaints filed by the Judicial Inquiry Commission. It has authority, after notice and public hearing, to impose one of two penalties:

- To remove from office, suspend without pay, or censure a judge, or apply such other sanction as may be prescribed by law, for violation of a Canon of Judicial Ethics, misconduct in office, failure to perform his or her duties, or
- To suspend with or without pay, or to retire a judge who is physically or mentally unable to perform his duties.

== Legislative branch ==
Like other states within the United States, Alabama has a legislative branch.

=== House of Representatives ===
==== General information ====
The Alabama House of Representatives is composed of 105 members, all elected from single-member districts of equal population across the state in the same cycle. Each member represents a district of approximately 40,000 people, and is elected to a four-year term. The Speaker of the House is currently Mac McCutcheon, a Republican. The current partisan line-up of the House of Representatives is 72 Republicans and 33 Democrats.

All revenue-raising matters must originate in the Alabama House. A majority of a quorum can pass any bill except a constitutional amendment, which requires a three-fifths vote of all those elected.

=== Senate ===
==== General information ====
The Alabama Senate is composed of 35 Senators. Each Senator represents a single-member district of approximately 125,000 Alabamians.

Senators must be at least 25 years of age at the time of their election, must be citizens and residents of the state of Alabama for at least 3 years, and reside within their district for at least one year prior to election.

All Senators are elected for four-year terms in the same cycle as the House of Representatives, the Governor, and other statewide constitutional officers.

While the House of Representatives has exclusive power to originate revenue bills, such legislation can be amended and/or substituted by the Senate. Moreover, because the Senate is historically considered to be the "deliberative body", its rules concerning length of debate are more relaxed than those of the House of Representatives. The Senate also has a history of filibusters that the rules of the lower house do not as easily tolerate.

The Alabama Senate has sole power of Confirmation of certain appointees designated by the Constitution and by statute.

=== Legislative sessions ===
==== Regular sessions ====
The Legislature convenes in regular annual sessions on the first Tuesday in February, except:

- In the first year of the four-year term, when the session begins on the first Tuesday in March, and
- In the last year of a four-year term, when the session begins on the second Tuesday in January.

The length of the regular session is limited to 30 meeting days within a period of 105 calendar days. Generally, two meeting or "legislative" days are held per week, with other days being devoted to committee meetings. The Alabama Constitution provides that no law shall be passed except by a bill, which is a proposed law written out in the proper format. Once approved in accordance with the state constitution, the bill becomes an act.

==== Special sessions ====
Special sessions of the Legislature may be called by the governor, with the proclamation listing those subjects that the governor wishes to be considered in that session. These sessions are limited to twelve legislative days within a thirty calendar day span. Whereas in a regular session bills may be enacted on any subject, in a special session, legislation must be enacted only on those subjects which the governor announces in their proclamation or "call." Anything not in the "call" requires a two-thirds vote of each house to be enacted.

Constitutional amendments always require a three-fifths vote of the elected Members of each house for passage, whether in regular or special session, and this constitutional provision cannot be abrogated by any governor. Likewise, while a governor's proclamation may itemize subjects to be considered in a special session, the proclamation cannot dictate that the legislature specifically consider only a bill which mirrors the exact language of a bill offered in a previous session. The legislature may offer and consider any bills it chooses in a special session, subject to the above-stated requirements for passage (depending upon whether the subject of the bill formed part of the governor's "call", or whether it is a constitutional amendment).

=== Lawmaking process ===
Alabama's lawmaking process differs somewhat from the other 49 states.

==== Beginnings ====
Each bill may only pertain to one subject (which must be clearly stated in the title), "except general appropriation bills, general revenue bills, and bills adopting a code, digest, or revision of statutes".

==== Committees ====
===== General information =====
Bills are referred to standing committees by the Lieutenant Governor and the President Pro Tempore in the Senate, and by the Speaker in the House of Representatives.

The Constitution states that each house shall determine the number of committees, and the numbers of committees vary from quadrennial session to session.

===== Legislative Council =====
The Alabama legislature has a Legislative Council, which is a permanent or continuing interim committee, composed as follows:

- From the Senate, the Lieutenant Governor and President Pro-Tempore, the Chairmen of Finance and Taxation, Rules, Judiciary, and Governmental Affairs, and six Senators elected by the Senate;
- From the House of Representatives, the Speaker and Speaker Pro-Tempore, the Chairmen of Ways and Means, Rules, Judiciary, and Local Government, and six Representatives elected by the House.
- The majority and minority leaders of each house.

The Legislative Council meets at least once quarterly to consider problems for which legislation may be needed, and to make recommendations for the next legislative session. A number of significant statutes have been placed on the Alabama law books as a result of this council's activity.

==== Post-committee ====
===== Reports of Committee =====
Any bill which affects state funding by more than $1,000, and which involves expenditure or collection of revenue, must have a "Fiscal Note". Fiscal Notes are prepared by the Legislative Fiscal Office and signed by the chairman of the committee reporting the bill. They must contain projected increases or decreases to state revenue in the event that the bill becomes law.

===== Third reading =====
Once the bill has been discussed, each member casts a vote as their name is called alphabetically. Since the state's Senate is rather small, voting may be done effectively in that house via manual roll call. An electronic voting machine is utilized in the House of Representatives.

If amendments are adopted, the bill is sent to the Enrolling and Engrossing Department of that house for engrossment. Engrossment is the process of incorporating amendments into the bill before transmittal to the second house.

===== Conference committees =====
A conference committee is empaneled to discusses the points of difference between the two houses' versions of the same bill, and tries to reach an agreement between them so that the identical bill can be passed by both houses.

When a bill has passed both houses in identical form, it is enrolled. The "enrolled" copy is the official bill, which, after it becomes law, is kept by the Secretary of State for reference in the event of any dispute as to its exact language. The bill is then ready for transmittal to the Governor.

===== Presentation to the governor =====
The governor may sign legislation, which completes its enactment into law. From this point, the bill becomes an act, and remains the law of the state unless repealed by legislative action, or overturned by a court decision. The governor may veto legislation to express disapproval of the bill. In the event of a veto, the governor returns the bill to the house in which it originated, with a message explaining his objections and suggesting any amendments (if applicable) which might remove those objections. The bill is then reconsidered, and if a simple majority of the members of both houses agrees to the proposed executive amendments, it is returned to the Governor, as revised, for a signature.

On the other hand, a simple majority of the members of each house can choose to approve a vetoed bill precisely as the Legislature originally passed it, in which case it becomes a law over the governor's veto. This is in contrast to the practice in most states and the federal government, which require a two-thirds majority in both houses to override a governor's veto.

If the Governor fails to return a bill to the legislative house in which it originated within six days after it was presented (not including Sundays), it becomes a law without their signature. This return can be prevented by recession of the Legislature. In that case the bill must be returned within two days after the legislature reassembles, or it becomes a law without the Governor's signature.

The bills that reach the Governor less than five days before the end of the session may be approved by him within ten days after adjournment. The bills not approved within that time do not become law. This is known as a "pocket veto". This is the most conclusive form of veto, for the Legislature (having adjourned) has no chance to reconsider the vetoed measure.

Alabama is one of the states in which the governor has the power to accept or reject any particular item of an appropriation bill without vetoing the entire bill. In this event, only the vetoed item of the appropriation bill is returned to the house of origin for reconsideration by the Legislature. The remainder of the bill becomes law. Alabama's laws are compiled and published in the Code of Alabama after their codification.

==== Constitutional amendments ====
Sometimes what the legislature wishes to accomplish cannot be done simply by the passage of a bill, but rather requires amending the Constitution. A bill or joint resolution is accordingly drafted to propose an appropriate amendment to the Constitution. This bill or joint resolution is introduced in the same manner as other bills and resolutions, and follows the course of ordinary bills, except that it must be read at length on three different days in each house. Furthermore, it must be passed in each house by a three-fifths vote of all the members elected, and does not require the approval of the governor. A constitutional amendment passed by the legislature is deposited directly with the Secretary of State. It is then submitted to the voters of the state at an election (the time of which is fixed by the Legislature), held not less than three months after the adjournment of the session in which the amendment was proposed. The governor announces the election by proclamation, and the proposed amendment and notice of the election must be published in every county for four successive weeks before the election. If a majority of those who vote at the election favor the amendment, it becomes a part of the Constitution. The result of the election is announced by proclamation of the governor.

== Seals of the government of Alabama ==
Seal of the governor of Alabama

Seal of the lieutenant governor of Alabama

Seal of the governor-elect of Alabama

Seal of the speaker of the Alabama House of Representatives

Seal of the Unified Judicial System of Alabama

Seal of the attorney general of Alabama

Seal of the Alabama Board of Pardons and Paroles

Seal of the Alabama Emergency Management Agency

Seal of the Alabama Department of Agriculture and Industries

Seal of the Alabama Department of Corrections

Seal of the Alabama Department of Homeland Security

Seal of the Alabama Department of Labor

Seal of the Alabama Department of Public Health

Seal of the Alabama Department of Public Safety

Seal of the Alabama Department of Transportation

Seal of the Alabama Treasury Department

Seal of the Securities Commission of Alabama

Seal of the Alabama National Guard

Coat of arms of the Alabama State Defense Force

== See also ==
- Elections in Alabama
- Courts of Alabama
