= 2022 Alabama State Treasurer election =

- November 8, 2022
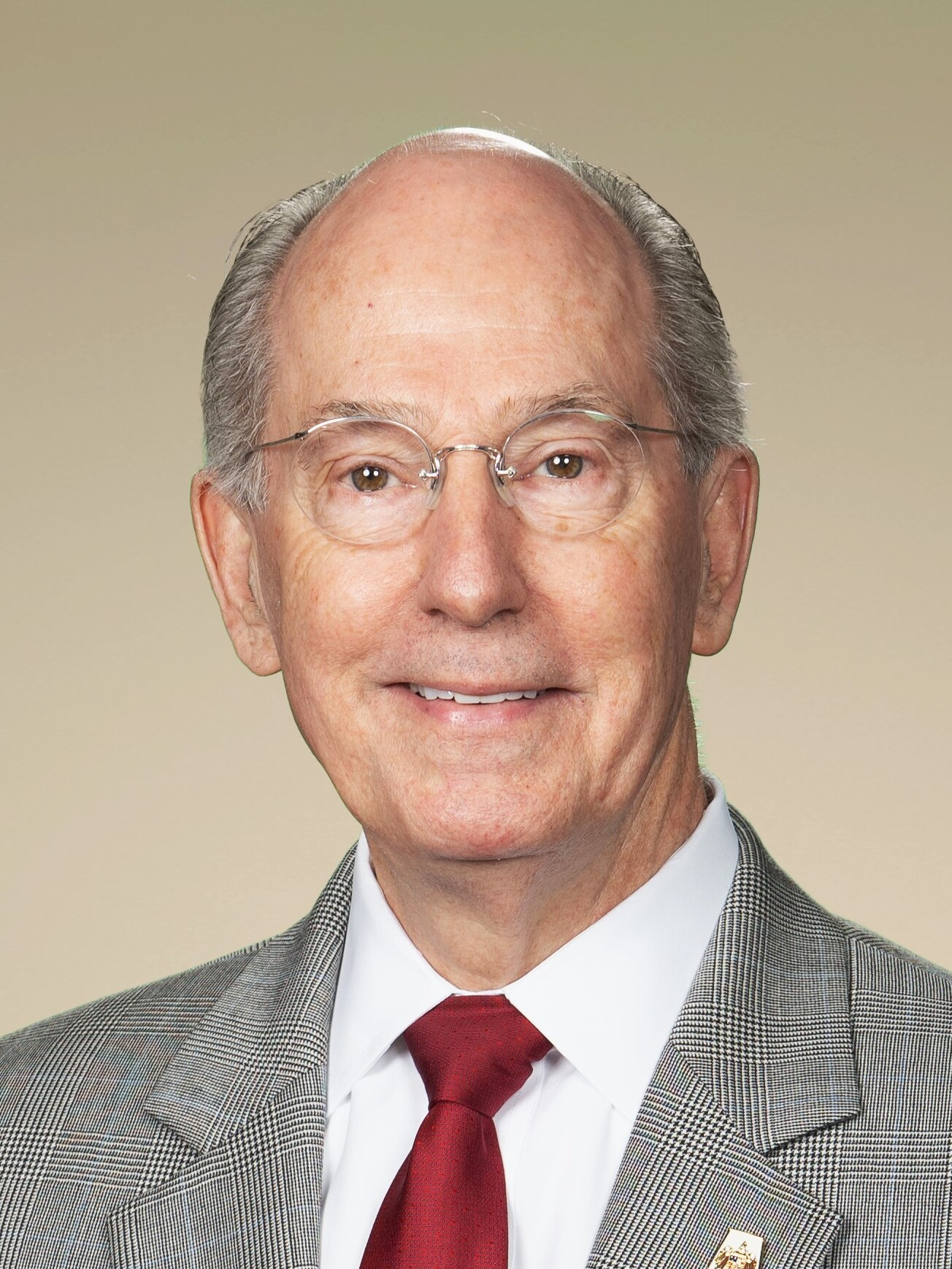

Nominee	Young Boozer	Scott Hammond
Party	Republican	Libertarian
Popular vote	946,936	175,034
Percentage	83.74%	15.48%
- Boozer: 40–50% 50–60% 60–70% 70–80% 80–90% >90% Hammond: 40–50% 50–60% 60–70% 70–80% 80–90% >90% Tie: 40-50% 50% No votes
State Treasurer before election
Young Boozer
Republican
Elected State Treasurer
Young Boozer
Republican

The 2022 Alabama State Treasurer election took place on November 8, 2022, to elect the Alabama State Treasurer. Incumbent Republican Party Treasurer Young Boozer, who previously served in the office from 2011 to 2019, was appointed to the position October 1, 2021 after the previous treasurer, John McMillan, resigned. Boozer won a full term.

== Republican primary ==
=== Candidates ===
==== Nominee ====
- Young Boozer, incumbent state treasurer

=== Endorsements ===
Young Boozer

Organizations

- Alabama Farmers Federation

== Libertarian convention ==
=== Candidates ===
==== Nominee ====
- Scott Hammond, former Treasurer of the Libertarian Party of Alabama

== General election ==
=== Results ===
2022 Alabama State Treasurer election
Party	Candidate	Votes	%	±%
Republican	Young Boozer (incumbent)	946,936	83.74%	−13.4%
Libertarian	Scott Hammond	175,034	15.48%	N/A
Write-in		8,855	0.78%	N/A
Total votes		1,130,825	100.00	
Republican hold				

== See also ==
- 2022 Alabama elections
