= 2022 Alabama Commissioner of Agriculture and Industries election =

- November 8, 2022
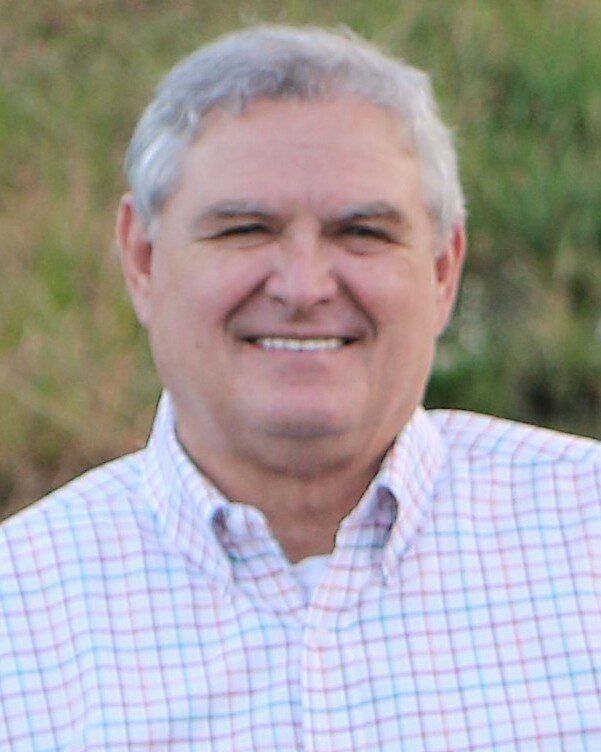

Candidate	Rick Pate	Jason Clark
Party	Republican	Libertarian
Popular vote	946,155	168,529
Percentage	84.26%	15.01%
- Pate: 40–50% 50–60% 60–70% 70–80% 80–90% >90% Clark: 40–50% 50–60% 60–70% 70–80% 80–90% >90% Tie: 40–50% 50% No votes
Commissioner before election
Rick Pate
Republican
Elected Commissioner
Rick Pate
Republican

The 2022 Alabama Commissioner of Agriculture and Industries election was held on November 8, 2022, to elect the Commissioner of Agriculture and Industries to a four-year term.

== Republican primary ==
=== Candidates ===
==== Nominee ====
- Rick Pate, incumbent commissioner

== Libertarian convention ==
=== Nominee ===
- Jason Clark

== General election ==
=== Results ===
2022 Alabama Commissioner of Agriculture and Industries election
Party	Candidate	Votes	%
Republican	Rick Pate (incumbent)	946,155	84.26
Libertarian	Jason Clark	168,529	15.01
Write-in		8,265	0.74
Total votes		1,122,949	100.00
Republican hold			
