= 2026 Alabama State Treasurer election =

- November 3, 2026
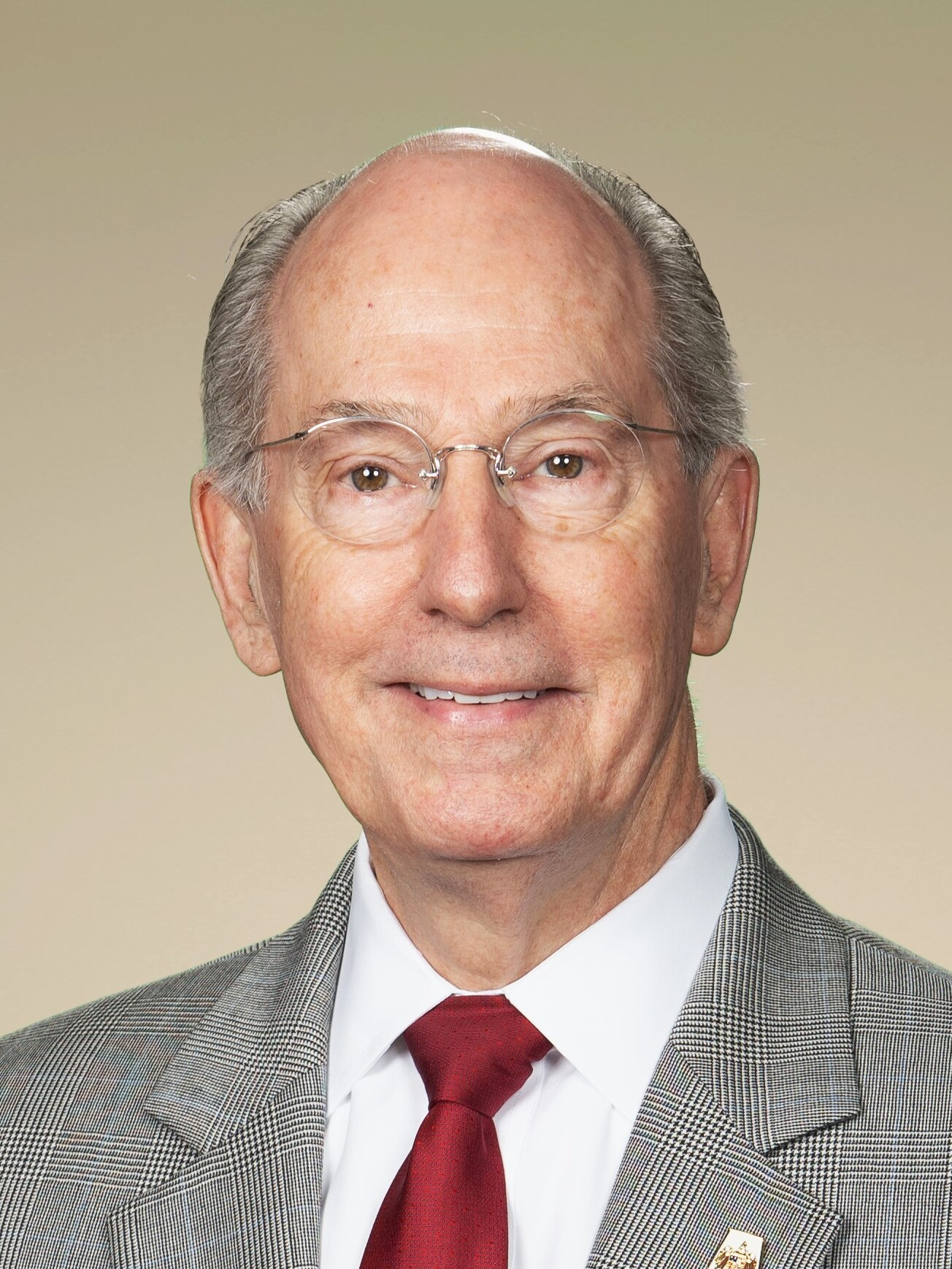

Candidate	Young Boozer	Rosilyn Houston
Party	Republican	Democratic
Popular vote	917,177	749,785
Percentage	55.0%	45.0%
- Boozer: 50–60% 60–70% 70–80% 80–90% Houston: 50–60% 60–70% 70–80% 80–90%
Treasurer before election
Young Boozer
Republican
Elected Treasurer
Young Boozer
Republican

The 2026 Alabama State Treasurer election was held on November 3, 2026, to elect the Alabama State Treasurer. Primary elections were held on May 19. Incumbent state treasurer Young Boozer won reelection for a second consecutive term, and a fourth non-consecutive term.

== Republican primary ==
Boozer was considered the favorite, receiving over 85% in the annual College Republican Federation of Alabama straw poll among members. He officially launched his re-election campaign on June 5, 2025.

=== Candidates ===
==== Nominee ====
- Young Boozer, incumbent treasurer

==== Eliminated in primary ====
- Steve Lolley, entrepreneur and candidate for state senate in 2018

=== Endorsements ===
Young Boozer

Organizations

- Alabama Farmers Federation
- Alabama Forestry Association
- Alabama Realtors PAC
- Manufacture Alabama

=== Fundraising ===
Campaign finance reports as of May 18, 2026
Candidate	Raised	Other receipts	Spent	Cash on hand
Young Boozer (R)	$246,402	$505,004	$622,970	$166,872
Steve Lolley (R)	$75,261	$100,000	$68,588	$106,673
Source: Alabama FCPA

=== Results ===
Primary results by county: Boozer: 50–60%; 60–70%; 70–80%; 80–90%; Lolley: 50–60%

Republican primary results
Party	Candidate	Votes	%
Republican	Young Boozer (incumbent)	306,295	68.0
Republican	Steve Lolley	143,864	32.0
Total votes		450,159	100.0

== Democratic primary ==
=== Candidates ===
==== Nominee ====
- Rosilyn Houston, banker

=== Fundraising ===
Campaign finance reports as of May 18, 2026
Candidate	Raised	Other receipts	Spent	Cash on hand
Rosilyn Houston (D)	$4,966	$1,050	$927	$5,089
Source: Alabama FCPA

== General election ==
=== Post-primary endorsements ===
Rosilyn Houston (D)

Organizations

- Alabama AFL-CIO

=== Fundraising ===
Campaign finance reports as of November 2, 2026
Candidate	Raised	Other receipts	Spent	Cash on hand
Young Boozer (R)	$275,427	$529,261	$782,811	$60,313
Rosilyn Houston (D)	$85,129	$1,450	$72,958	$13,620
Source: Alabama FCPA

=== Results ===
2026 Alabama State Treasurer election
Party	Candidate	Votes	%
Republican	Young Boozer (incumbent)	917,177	54.98
Democratic	Rosilyn Houston	749,785	44.95
Write-in		1,100	0.07
Total votes		1,668,062	100.00
