= Governor of Alabama =

Head of government of the U.S. state of Alabama

Governor of the State of Alabama
- Seal of the governor

- Standard of the governor

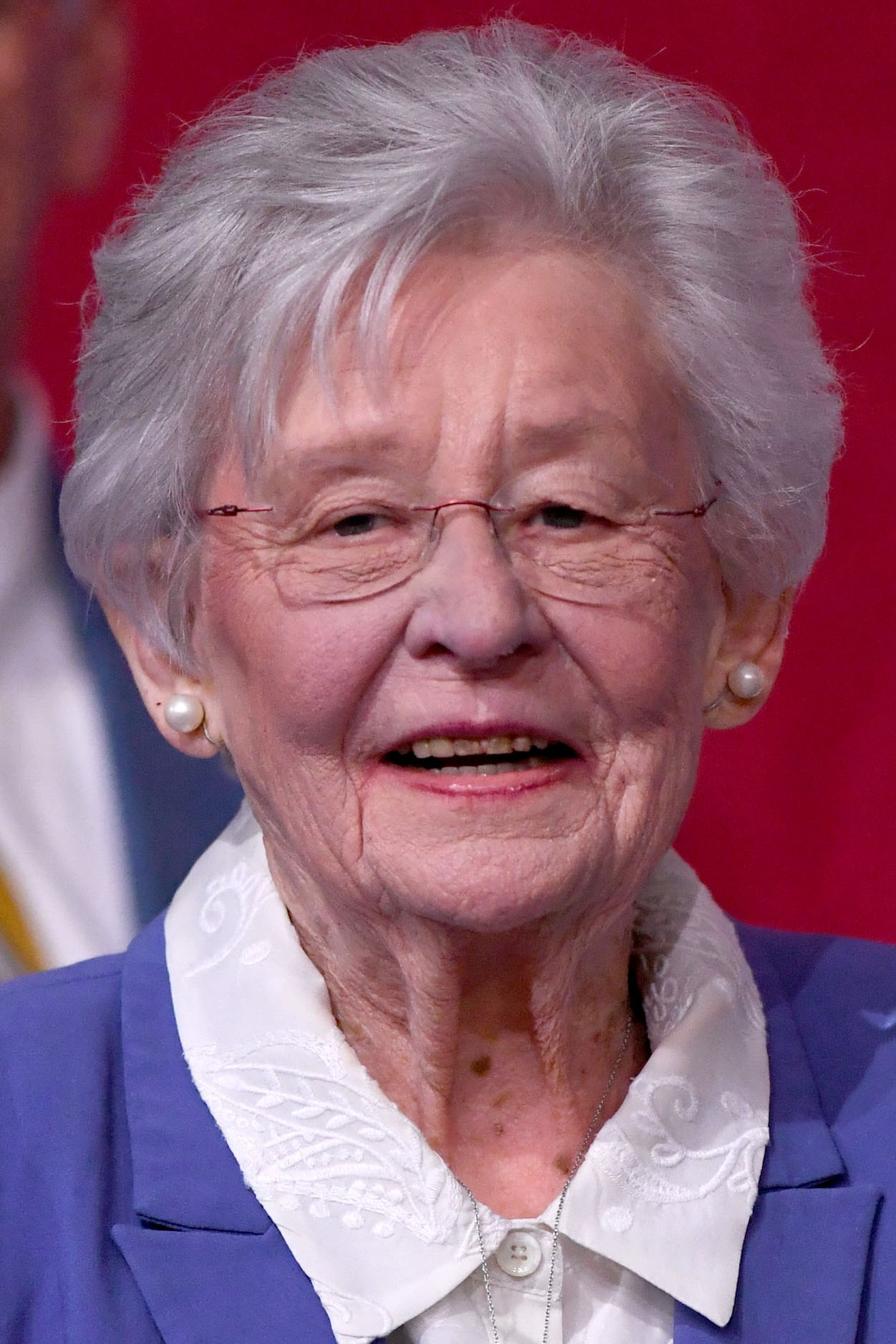
- Incumbent; Kay Ivey since April 10, 2017
- Government of Alabama
- Style: Governor (informal); The Honorable (formal)
- Status: Chief executive; Head of government
- Residence: Alabama Governor's Mansion
- Term length: Four years, renewable once consecutively
- Precursor: Governor of Alabama Territory
- Inaugural holder: William Wyatt Bibb
- Formation: December 14, 1819 (206 years ago)
- Succession: Line of succession
- Deputy: Lieutenant Governor of Alabama
- Salary: $127,833 (2022)
- Website: governor.alabama.gov

The governor of Alabama is the head of government of the U.S. state of Alabama. The governor is the head of the executive branch of Alabama's state government and is charged with enforcing state laws. Kay Ivey is the 54th and current governor since 2017.

== History ==
The office of governor was created by the first Constitution of Alabama in 1819. The 1819 constitution provided the governor with a two-year term, which lasted until 1901 when it was extended to four years. Prior to the 1819 constitution, Alabama had a single territorial governor, William W. Bibb, who also served as the first state governor. Bibb died in office and his brother, Thomas Bibb, succeeded as the state's second governor. Thomas Bibb had been the first to settle the territory, but lacked his brother's political abilities and was viewed as a caretaker governor.

In 1861, Alabama seceded from the Union and joined the Confederate States of America. The governor at the time, Andrew B. Moore, had been elected as an anti-secessionist and was initially resistant to the idea until Abraham Lincoln's victory in the 1860 United States presidential election. In January 1861, Moore ordered the Alabama militia to seize federal institutions in the state, and signed an ordinance which formalized the state's secession. The next governor, John Gill Shorter, took office in 1861 and was the first governor elected under the Confederacy. In 1862, Shorter signed a law requiring conscription of Alabama men into the Confederate military. Later that year, he also signed a bill requiring the conscription of slaves, much to the anger of slaveholders. Thomas Hill Watts was the final Confederate governor, with Lewis E. Parsons being named provisional governor by President Andrew Johnson at the war's end. During this time, Wager Swayne also served as the state's de facto military governor, overseeing Parsons and his elected successor, Robert M. Patton.

From the end of Reconstruction until 1987, all Alabama governors were members of the Democratic Party. Alabama's three time governor George Wallace was among the state's most well known: known for his leading role in the mid 20th century's pro-segregation movement and as an unsuccessful presidential candidate multiple times over. Wallace chose not to make a gubernatorial run in 1986. That election was won by H. Guy Hunt, who became the first Republican since Reconstruction to hold that office. Almost all of the state's governors have been Republicans since his election.

== Term and qualifications ==
Since 1968, the governor is elected for a four-year term and may be re-elected only once consecutively. Any candidate for the governor of Alabama must meet the following qualifications:

- Be at least 30 years old
- Be a registered voter in Alabama and a resident for at least seven years
- Be a United States citizen for at least ten years

From 1819 to 1875, the governor was elected to a two-year term and could be re-elected once. From 1875 to 1901, after the end of the Reconstruction era, the governor was elected to a two-year term, but could be re-elected any number of times. From 1901 to 1968, the governor was elected to a four-year term, but could not be re-elected, except non-consecutively. In 1968, the constitution was amended to allow the governor and other statewide elected executive officials to serve 2 consecutive 4-year terms for a total of 8 years, but are eligible to run again after a period of 4 years or more out of office has actually elapsed.

Gubernatorial elections take place alongside elections for the offices of lieutenant governor, attorney general, state auditor, secretary of state, state treasurer, and the commissioner of agriculture and industries. These elections including the elections for governor and lieutenant governor only occur once every 4 years during the midterm elections (ie. years with no nationwide federal presidential election).

== Gubernatorial powers ==
Section 113 of the Alabama Constitution describes the office of governor as follows:

The supreme executive power of the state shall be vested in a chief magistrate, who shall be styled "The Governor of the State of Alabama".

The governor has a variety of powers ranging from executive to legislative in nature. The governor signs or vetoes bills passed by the Legislature, and ensures the proper execution of laws. The governor appoints a variety of state officers, including members of their Cabinet and at least one member of over 450 boards or commissions. The governor also chairs several of those boards or commissions. The governor is the commander-in-chief of the Alabama militia and has oversight of the state's finances. Finally, the governor has a variety of special powers including calling special sessions of the Legislature, filling vacancies in elected and local offices, and the power to grant clemency.

== Succession ==
The office of Lieutenant Governor of Alabama was created in 1868 and is first in the gubernatorial line of succession. Prior to then, the president of the Alabama Senate was first in line. Section 127 of the current constitution provides for the following line of succession, with all those after the lieutenant governor instead becoming acting governor:

1. the Lieutenant Governor of Alabama
2. the President pro tempore of the Alabama Senate
3. the Speaker of the Alabama House of Representatives
4. the Attorney General of Alabama
5. the State Auditor of Alabama
6. the Secretary of State of Alabama
7. the Alabama State Treasurer

== See also ==
- First ladies and gentlemen of Alabama
