= 2025 Mobile City Council election =

Local election in Alabama, U.S.

- August 26, 2025

The 2025 Mobile City Council election took place on August 26, 2025, to elect all seven members of the Mobile City Council, the lawmaking body of Mobile, Alabama. Runoff elections would have been held if no candidate received 50% of the vote.

== District 1 ==
=== Candidates ===
==== Declared ====
- Cory Penn, incumbent councilor
- Herman Thomas, former Mobile County circuit judge

=== Results ===
2025 Mobile City Council election, district 1
Candidate	Votes	%
Cory Penn (incumbent)	3,789	68.14
Herman Thomas	1,772	31.86
Total votes	5,561	100.00

== District 2 ==
=== Candidates ===
==== Declared ====
- William Carroll, incumbent councilor
- Reggie Hill, community activist
- Samantha Ingram, former Mobile County Public Schools superintendent

=== Results ===
2025 Mobile City Council election, district 2
Candidate	Votes	%
Samantha Ingram	3,304	52.80
William Carroll (incumbent)	2,696	43.08
Reggie Hill	258	4.12
Total votes	6,258	100.00

== District 3 ==
=== Candidates ===
==== Declared ====
- C. J. Small, incumbent councilor

=== Results ===
2025 Mobile City Council election, district 3
Candidate	Votes	%
C. J. Small (incumbent)	Unopposed	100.00

== District 4 ==
=== Candidates ===
==== Declared ====
- Bill Appling, former police detective
- Ben Reynolds, incumbent councilor

=== Results ===
2025 Mobile City Council election, district 4
Candidate	Votes	%
Ben Reynolds (incumbent)	5,377	77.87
Bill Appling	1,528	22.13
Total votes	6,905	100.00

== District 5 ==
=== Candidates ===
==== Declared ====
- Beau Fleming, physical therapist

==== Declined ====
- Joel Daves, incumbent councilor

=== Results ===
2025 Mobile City Council election, district 5
Candidate	Votes	%
Beau Fleming	Unopposed	100.00

== District 6 ==
=== Candidates ===
==== Declared ====
- William Frazier, activist
- Paul Onderdonk, former police detective
- Josh Woods, incumbent councilor

=== Results ===
2025 Mobile City Council election, district 6
Candidate	Votes	%
Josh Woods	3,932	71.65
Matt Frazier	1,304	23.76
Paul "Donk" Onderdonk	252	4.59
Total votes	5,488	100.00

== District 7 ==
=== Candidates ===
==== Declared ====
- Robert Battles Sr., former county school board member
- Gina Gregory, incumbent councilor

=== Results ===
2025 Mobile City Council election, district 7
Candidate	Votes	%
Gina Gregory (incumbent)	3,610	67.74
Robert E. Battles Sr.	1,719	32.26
Total votes	5,329	100.00
