= 1946 Alabama Commissioner of Agriculture election =

- November 5, 1946
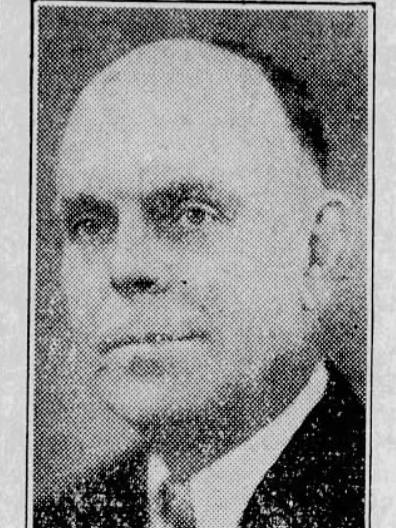

Candidate	Haygood Paterson	J. N. Dennis
Party	Democratic	Republican
Popular vote	163,911	22,395
Percentage	88.0%	12.0%
Commissioner of Agriculture before election
Haygood Paterson
Democratic
Elected Commissioner of Agriculture
Haygood Paterson
Democratic

The 1946 Alabama Commissioner of Agriculture election was held on November 5, 1946, to elect the Alabama Commissioner of Agriculture to a four-year term. The primary election was held on May 7, 1946.

== Democratic primary ==
=== Candidates ===
==== Nominee ====
- Haygood Paterson, incumbent commissioner

==== Eliminated in primary ====
- Mason M. Paschall, farmer

=== Results ===
Democratic primary
Party	Candidate	Votes	%
Democratic	Haygood Paterson	208,136	77.54
Democratic	Mason M. Paschall	60,304	22.46
Total votes		268,440	100.00

== Republican convention ==
=== Candidates ===
==== Nominee ====
- J. N. Dennis

== General election ==
=== Results ===
1946 Alabama Commissioner of Agriculture election
Party	Candidate	Votes	%
Democratic	Haygood Paterson	163,911	87.98
Republican	J. N. Dennis	22,395	12.02
Total votes		186,306	100.00
