= William B. Allgood =

Alabama state auditor and state treasurer

William Barnett Allgood

State Auditor of Alabama
- In office 1923–1927

Alabama State Treasurer
- In office 1927–1931

Personal details
- Born: April 6, 1868
- Died: July 18, 1933 (aged 65)
- Party: Democratic

William Barnett Allgood (April 5, 1868 – July 18, 1933) was a government official in Alabama who served as the State Auditor of Alabama from 1923 to 1927 and as Alabama State Treasurer from 1927 to 1932.

== Early life ==
William Barnett Allgood was born on April 5, 1868, in the town of Allgood (then named Chepultepec) in Blount County, Alabama. His father was Dr. William Allgood and his mother was Mary Matilda (Ingram) Allgood. One of his brothers was Miles Clayton Allgood, who also served in the state government of Alabama and was a U.S. Representative.

Allgood attended public schools in Chepultepec and attended the Enterprise Academy.

== Career ==
Allgood was a teacher for one year at Enterprise Academy and for one year at Arkadelphia. From 1901 to 1906, Allgood worked in the dairy industry and in truck farming. From 1907 to 1912, Allgood was the chief clerk of the Louisville and Nashville Railroad at Birmingham, Alabama. From 1913 to 1914, Allgood was the fire inspector for Birmingham, Alabama. From 1915 to 1919, Allgood was the chief clerk in the state auditor's office.

He then held state offices, serving as the chief clerk for the Alabama Department of Agriculture and Industries from 1ol919 to 1922. In 1923, Allgood was elected State Auditor of Alabama and served in that position until 1927, when he was elected as Alabama State Treasurer. His term as State Treasurer ended in 1931.

Allgood was a Democrat.

== Personal life ==
In 1901, Allgood married Arminta F. They had multiple children.

Allgood was a Methodist and a Knight of Pythias.

== Death ==
Allgood died on July 18, 1933. He was 65 years old.
