= Haygood Paterson =

American politician

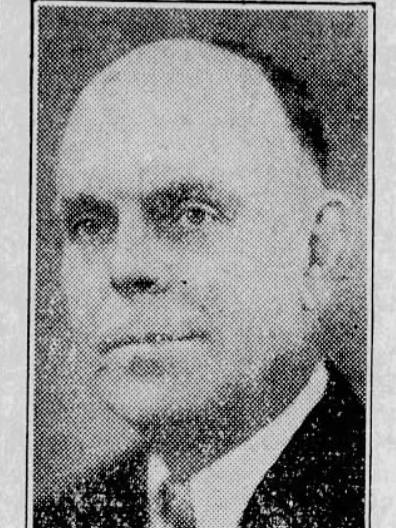
- Paterson in 1941

Alabama Commissioner of Agriculture
- In office 1947–1951
- Preceded by: Joseph N. Poole
- Succeeded by: Frank M. Stewart
- In office 1939–1943
- Preceded by: R.J. Goode
- Succeeded by: Joseph N. Poole

J. Haygood Paterson (c. 1885 – July 13, 1954) was an American politician who served as the Alabama Commissioner of Agriculture as a member of the Alabama Democratic Party. He was first elected in 1938, after winning the Democratic primary.

In 1946, he ran against Mason Paschall in the primary election, where Paterson won with 77% of the vote.

Paterson died at his home in Montgomery on July 13, 1954, at the age of 69.
