= 2024 Alabama elections =

General election in Alabama during November 2024

A general election was held in the U.S. state of Alabama on November 5, 2024. The primary elections for all offices was held on March 5, 2024. The deadline to register to vote was October 21, 2024.

== Ballot measures ==
Two statewide ballot measures appeared on the ballot in Alabama: one in March and one in November. The first measure was narrowly defeated while the second one was approved overwhelmingly.

=== March 2024 Amendment ===
Results by county Yes: 70–80%; 60–70%; 50–60%; No: 60–70%; 50–60%

The Exempt Local Bills from Budget Isolation Resolution Amendment would exempt local laws or local constitutional amendments from the budget isolation resolution process.

Amendment 1 (March)
Choice	Votes	%
For	341,515	48.69
Against	359,850	51.31
Total	701,365	100.00

=== November 2024 Amendment ===
Results by county Yes: >90%; 80–90%; 70–80%; 60–70%; 50–60%

The Allow Franklin County Board of Education to Manage, Sell, or Lease Land in the Franklin County School System Amendment would authorize the Franklin County Board of Education to manage, sell, or lease lands and natural resources within the Franklin County School System located in Walker and Fayette counties.

Amendment 1 (November)
Choice	Votes	%
For	1,159,794	74.37
Against	399,640	25.63
Total	1,559,434	100.00

== Local ==
Local elections are held in each county to elect members of the local Boards of Education, county commissions, and circuit court positions.
