= 2006 Alabama State Treasurer election =

- November 7, 2006
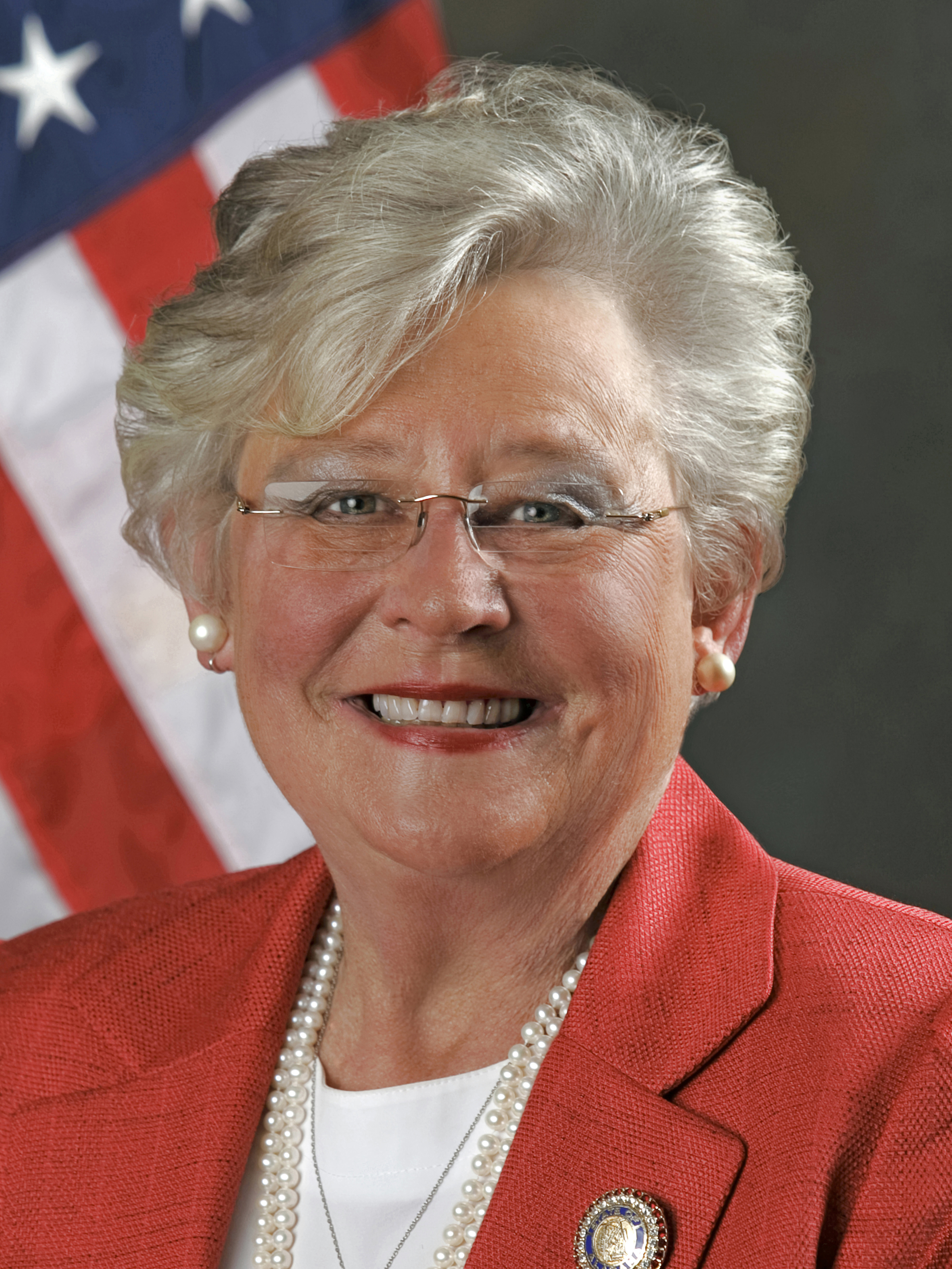

Candidate	Kay Ivey	Steve Segrest
Party	Republican	Democratic
Popular vote	724,861	471,570
Percentage	60.55%	39.39%
- County results Ivey: 50–60% 60–70% 70–80% 80–90% Segrest: 50–60% 60–70% 70–80% 80–90%
State Treasurer before election
Kay Ivey
Republican
Elected State Treasurer
Kay Ivey
Republican

The 2006 Alabama State Treasurer election was held on November 7, 2006, to elect the Alabama State Treasurer. Republican incumbent Kay Ivey won re-election to a second term, easily defeating Democratic businessman and relator Steve Segrest by twenty-one percentage points.

== Democratic primary ==
=== Candidates ===
- Steve Segrest, businessman and realtor

=== Results ===
Democratic primary results
Party	Candidate	Votes	%
Democratic	Steve Segrest	226,803	61.72%
Democratic	Keith Williams	140,697	38.28%
Total votes		367,500	100.00%

== General election ==
=== Candidates ===
- Kay Ivey, incumbent Alabama State Treasurer (2003–2011) (Republican)
- Steve Segrest, businessman and realtor (Democratic)

=== Results ===
2006 Alabama State Treasurer election results
Party	Candidate	Votes	%	±%
Republican	Kay Ivey	724,861	60.55%	+9.78%
Democratic	Steve Segrest	471,570	39.39%	−7.44%
Write-in		730	0.06%	-0.02%
Total votes		1,197,161	100.00%	
Republican hold				
