= Steve McMillan (politician) =

American politician (1941–2022)

Member of the Alabama House of Representatives from the 95th district
- In office November 1980 – April 28, 2022
- Preceded by: John McMillan
- Succeeded by: Frances Holk-Jones

Personal details
- Born: Stephen Albert McMillan; July 6, 1941 Mobile, Alabama, U.S.
- Died: April 28, 2022 (aged 80)
- Party: Republican (after 1989); Democratic (until 1989)
- Spouse: Gayle McMillan
- Education: Auburn University (BA)
- Profession: Real estate broker

Stephen Albert McMillan (July 6, 1941 – April 28, 2022) was an American politician and real estate broker. From 1980 until his death, he was a member of the Alabama House of Representatives representing the 95th District (lower Baldwin County), first serving as a Democrat before switching to the Republican Party in 1989. He was first elected to succeed his twin brother, John McMillan. At the time of his death, he was the longest-serving member of the Alabama House of Representatives.

== Early life and education ==
McMillan was born on July 6, 1941, in Mobile, Alabama. He graduated from Auburn University with a Bachelor of Arts in 1964. He later served in the United States Army Reserve from 1964 to 1970.

== Career ==
A real estate broker by trade, McMillan owned and operated his own real estate company, McMillan & Associates. In 1980, McMillan ran in a special election for the Alabama House of Representatives to fill the seat of his twin brother John McMillan, who vacated his seat to become the state's commissioner of conservation and natural resources. McMillan was elected as a Democrat, but switched to the Republican Party in 1989.

In 1983, McMillan publicly supported a referendum election in unincorporated areas on Pleasure Island in Baldwin County. McMillan stated he was convinced to do so after meetings with island residents who desired increased land use control, though his earlier zoning proposals were opposed by the Gulf Coast Area Chamber of Commerce and the committee to Protect Property Rights. McMillan introduced a bill that would require a literacy test for driver's licenses in 1988, stating "I don't want people on the road who can't read road signs." In 1993, McMillan suggested that voters in every county in Alabama should be able to vote on introducing electronic gambling machines, referencing a bill that had previously restricted it to just four counties.

McMillan often worked with education issues during his tenure. In 1987, McMillan served as chairman of the House Education Committee; according to The Montgomery Advertiser, McMillan frequently came into conflict with Paul Hubbert from the Alabama Education Association during his chairmanship. He was also a member of the House Ways and Means Education Committee, and supported charter schools, as well as bills to remove the State Board of Education's authority over K–12 schools.

In the aftermath of the Deepwater Horizon oil spill in 2011, McMillan was appointed by Governor Bob Riley along with two other state legislators to determine how to spend $15 million given to Baldwin County in response to the disaster. In 2012, McMillan was involved in the passing of a series of laws that targeted insurance fraud in the state. The same year, he defended a controversial immigration bill affecting Baldwin County, claiming that many of the problems that had been raised with the proposal by local farmers were actually products of inaccurate perceptions. In 2014, McMillan partnered with State Senator Gerald Dial to sponsor a bill that would guarantee the right to school prayer, despite concerns of constitutionality regarding the U.S. Supreme Court decision of Engel v. Vitale.

In 2017, McMillan targeted child abuse at residential camps and schools with HB-440, working with Prichard, Alabama, police captain Charles Kennedy to increase oversight of such facilities. The bill was signed into law on July 29, 2017, and received coverage in national news outlets, with Vice News calling it "a rare example of increased government regulation of religion in the Trump era", as the law did not exclude religious camps from regulation.

McMillan sponsored at least two bills supporting animal welfare; in 2010, he sponsored legislation that banned gas chambers as a method of euthanasia for animals, and in 2021, he sponsored a bill that allowed restaurants to have outdoor dining areas for dogs, which was later signed into law by Governor Kay Ivey.

Alabama's Fair Ballot Commission, which approves official statements explaining ballot measures that are up for vote in the state, was created in 2014 with the passage of HB-9, a bill sponsored by McMillan. McMillan also helped create the Gulf Shores/Orange Beach Tourism organization, as well as the State Teacher of the Year program (alongside Ann Bedsole) during his time in the state legislature. Allison Marlow wrote for Gulf Coast Media in 2022 that McMillan's work in the state legislature had "a special lean towards children’s issues both in his district and across the state," referencing McMillan's work on HB-440 in particular. In July 2021, McMillan announced that he would retire at the end of his term and would not seek re-election in 2022.

== Personal life ==
McMillan was married to his wife Gayle McMillan; the couple have two sons, and resided in Bay Minette, Alabama. Former state treasurer John McMillan is his twin brother. His daughter Adrienne McMillan Burns, from previous marriage to April Pucetti, died of brain cancer in 2004. https://obits.al.com/us/obituaries/birmingham/name/adrienne-burns-obituary?id=14574745

=== Health and death ===
In January 2022, McMillan announced he had been diagnosed with cancer. Three small tumors were detected in his brain, and he stated he would be undergoing treatment that month. He died on April 28, 2022, aged 80.
