= Isaac Vincent =

13th State Treasurer of Alabama

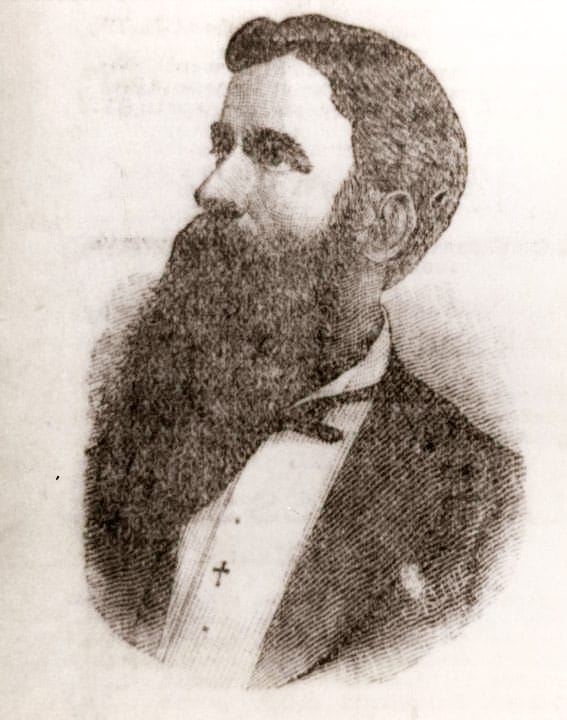

13th Treasurer of Alabama
- In office 1878–1883
- Governor: Rufus W. Cobb; Edward A. O'Neal
- Preceded by: Daniel Crawford
- Succeeded by: Frederick Smith

Personal details
- Born: Isaac Harvey Vincent; 1830/1842; Brazos Department, Coahuila y Tejas, Mexico or Matagorda County, Republic of Texas
- Died: March 12, 1898; Palo Pinto, Texas, U.S.
- Resting place: LaFayette, Alabama, U.S.
- Political party: Democratic; Conservative; People's
- Nickname: Honest Ike

Isaac Harvey Vincent (1830/1842 – March 12, 1898) was an American politician who served as the 13th Treasurer of Alabama.

== Early life ==
Isaac Harvey Vincent was born in what is now Matagorda County, Texas, in 1830 or November–December 1842. His family moved to Alabama after his mother's death and he grew up in Autauga and Chambers counties. He was captain of Company I in the 47th Alabama Infantry during the American Civil War and was wounded at the Battle of the Wilderness. He married Frances Richards, the daughter of newspaper editor and probate judge Evan Richards, and had two children with her.

== Career ==
Vincent was a delegate to the 1867 Conservative convention representing Chambers County. He was elected treasurer of Chambers County in 1871. He worked as a private secretary for Governor George S. Houston from 1876 to 1878.

Vincent sought the Democratic nomination for state auditor in 1876, but withdrew after the third ballot and Willis Brewer was nominated instead. He won the Democratic nomination for Alabama State Treasurer with unanimous support on the fifth ballot and won in the 1878 election. He was elected to two more terms. He defeated Isaac M. Jackson, J.M. Renfro, and G.H. Gibson after seven ballots at the Democratic convention in 1882. He was known by the nickname "Honest Ike".

== Theft and later life ==
In January 1883, Vincent's clerk told him that a surprise audit was planned for the treasury. On January 29, Vincent emptied his office safe and fled and a $5,000 (equivalent to $168,732 in 2024) reward was offered for his arrest. A committee investigating the treasury's management stated that there was an unexplained deficit of $217,687 in accounts (equivalent to $7,346,159 in 2024). Over $40,000 alone was missing from the county school system fund for each year of Vincent's tenure. He eluded arrest until being captured by deputy sheriff Eldridge C. Ray, who received the $5,000 reward, in Big Sandy, Texas, on March 13, 1887. He stated that his escape route went from Alabama to Cincinnati to St. Louis and ended in Mexico where he and his family lived, that he was suffering from a lung disease for the past two years and that he had planned to seek treatment in New York.

Vincent was extradited to Alabama on March 16, where he was indicted on 39 charges of embezzlement. He was sentenced to fifteen years in prison on three counts while the remaining charges were nolle prosequi. For punishment, he performed hard labor at the state coal mines in Pratt. Only a small amount of the stolen money was ultimately recovered. The office of the examiner of public accounts was created on February 16, 1885, in response to Vincent's crimes.

In 1889, having completed less than two years of his sentence, Vincent petitioned the state legislature to put a pardon for him onto the ballot as a referendum. He was pardoned by Governor Thomas G. Jones on May 23, 1893, after a petition was signed by 25,000 people and 108 legislators. Vincent later became a life insurance agent and edited the Monthly Union, a newspaper affiliated with the People's Party. Vincent died in Palo Pinto, Texas, on March 12, 1898, and was buried in LaFayette, Alabama.
