= David Grimes (politician) =

American politician

Member of the Alabama House of Representatives from the 73rd district
- In office 2002–2010
- Succeeded by: Joe Hubbard

Personal details
- Party: Republican

David G. Grimes is an American politician who served in the Alabama House of Representatives from the 73rd district from 2002 to 2010.

== Political positions ==
Grimes endorsed the Donald Trump presidential campaign in the 2024 United States presidential election and was a delegate at the 2024 Republican National Convention.
