= Courts of Alabama =

Courts of Alabama include:

State courts of Alabama

- Supreme Court of Alabama
  - Alabama Court of Civil Appeals
  - Alabama Court of Criminal Appeals
    - Alabama Circuit Courts (41 circuits)
      - Alabama District Courts (67 districts)
      - Alabama Municipal Courts (273 courts)
      - Alabama Probate Courts (68 courts)
  - Alabama Court of the Judiciary

Federal courts located in Alabama

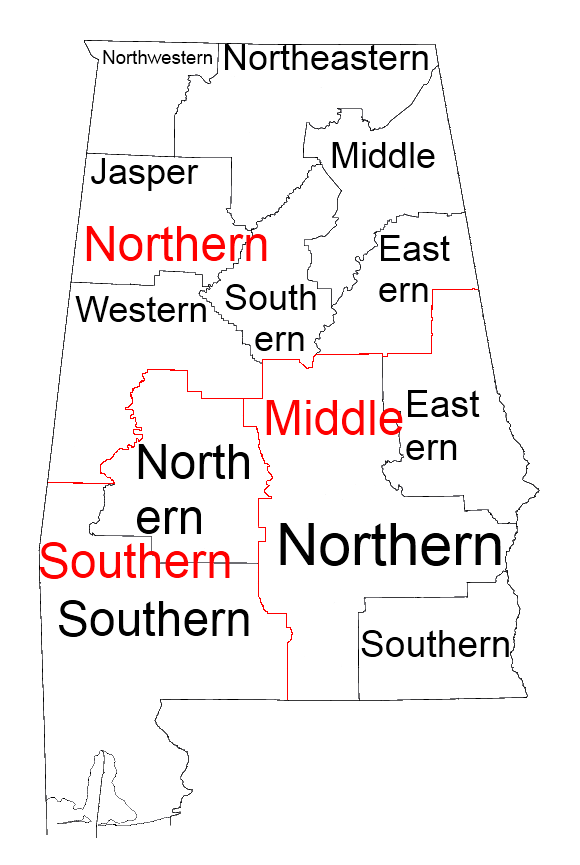
Map of U.S. District Courts

- United States District Court for the Northern District of Alabama
- United States District Court for the Middle District of Alabama
- United States District Court for the Southern District of Alabama

(All United States District Courts in Alabama may be appealed to the United States Court of Appeals for the Eleventh Circuit, headquartered in Atlanta, Georgia)

Former federal courts of Alabama

- United States District Court for the District of Alabama (extinct, subdivided in 1824)
