= Joe Hubbard =

American politician

Member of the Alabama House of Representatives from the 73rd district
- In office November 2, 2010 – November 5, 2014
- Preceded by: David Grimes
- Succeeded by: Matt Fridy

Personal details
- Born: Montgomery, Alabama
- Party: Democratic
- Education: Huntingdon College, Cumberland School of Law
- Website: Joe Hubbard on the House Website

Joseph Lister Hubbard Jr. is an American attorney in Montgomery, Alabama. Hubbard formerly was a member of the Alabama House of Representatives, representing the 73rd district, in Montgomery County. Hubbard was the Democratic Party nominee for the Office of the Attorney General of the State of Alabama in 2014.

== Early life ==
Joe Hubbard was born and raised in Montgomery, Alabama. His great-grandfather (and namesake) was Alabama congressman and senator J. Lister Hill. Hubbard received his primary education from the Montgomery Academy. In 2003, Hubbard graduated from Huntingdon College and enrolled in the Juris Doctor program at the Cumberland School of Law in Birmingham, Alabama. After graduating law school in 2006, he was a law clerk to Alabama Supreme Court associate judge Champ Lyons before opening his own law firm.

== Political career ==
In 2010, Joe Hubbard was elected to the Alabama House of Representatives as a Representative of Alabama's 73rd district. In addition to being one of the youngest members of the House of Representatives, he was also the only Democrat to successfully unseat a Republican in the state's 2010 general election when he defeated incumbent Republican House member David Grimes.

Themes for Hubbard's 2010 legislative campaign jobs, education, and ethics reform.

In 2014, Joe Hubbard received the Democratic nomination for the Office of Attorney General of the State of Alabama. Hubbard was defeated by incumbent Republican Luther Strange. Following the 2014 election, Joe opened the Joe Hubbard Law firm in the Montgomery, Alabama.

In 2015, Hubbard briefly campaigned for Circuit Court Judge but dropped out of the race weeks later.

Party political offices
Preceded by James Anderson	Democratic nominee for Attorney General of Alabama; 2014	Succeeded by Joseph Siegelman
