= Alabama Circuit Courts =

State trial courts in Alabama

The Alabama Circuit Courts are the state trial courts of general jurisdiction in the State of Alabama. The Circuit Courts have jurisdiction to hear civil and criminal cases. For civil cases, the courts has authority to try cases with an amount in controversy of more than $3,000 and has exclusive original jurisdiction over claims for more than $10,000. The Circuit Courts are the criminal trial courts for most felony charges, and for some misdemeanors and lesser included offenses. The Circuit Courts also have appellate jurisdiction over certain cases arising from the Alabama District Courts (the trial courts of limited jurisdiction in Alabama).

The state has 148 Circuit Court judges divided among 41 judicial circuits with the number of judges to each circuit set by acts of the Alabama Legislature. The legislature distribution is roughly based upon caseloads of the various circuits. The largest circuit in the state is the 10th Judicial Circuit which encompasses Jefferson County (approximately 20% of the state's population) and is the seat of 27 of the judges. The smallest circuits are the 2nd, 3rd, 24th, 34th, 35th, 36th, 40th, and 41st which each contain just a single judge and represent many of the least populous counties in the state.

Circuit Judges are elected to six-year terms in partisan elections with no limit on the number of terms. Judges may not seek re-election upon turning seventy years of age. The partisan alignment of the Circuit Judges following the 2018 general election is 92 Republicans, 55 Democrats, and 1 Independent. However, a large majority (35) of the Democrats 55 judgeships are in just two counties (Jefferson and Montgomery) while the Republican judgeships are spread among 45 different counties. In the event of a vacancy during a term of office, the Governor of Alabama usually has the authority to fill the unexpired terms. However, the 10th, 18th, 28th Circuits have judicial commissions which submit nominees from which the Governor is obligated to choose. Upon retirement judges may choose to become active retired where they serve as special judges when called upon and are still held to the cannon of ethics. Judges may also serve as special judges outside of their respective circuit while holding office when called upon.

In 2017, the Alabama Legislature established the Judicial Resources Allocation Commission for the purpose of moving vacant circuit court seats between districts to meet demand. It reallocated a circuit court seat for the first time in 2023, moving Jefferson County's 14th seat to Madison County. In May 2023, Governor Kay Ivey signed a bill that increased the total number of circuit and district judges throughout the state, and forbade the Allocation Commission from reallocating vacant seats until January 1, 2027, after the 2026 general election.

== List of elected judges ==
The following judges were elected in the 2020, 2022, and 2024 general elections:

Circuit	Place	Judge	Party	Last elected	Counties served	Notes
1st	No. 1	J. Perry Newton	Republican	2022	Choctaw, Clarke, Washington	
1st	No. 2	Charles R. Montgomery	Republican	2022	Choctaw, Clarke, Washington	
2nd		Cleve Poole	Republican	2024	Butler, Crenshaw, Lowndes	
3rd		Burt Smithart	Democratic	2022	Barbour, Bullock	
4th	No. 1	Collins Pettaway Jr.	Democratic	2024	Bibb, Dallas, Hale, Perry, Wilcox	
4th	No. 2	Don McMillan	Democratic	2022	Bibb, Dallas, Hale, Perry, Wilcox	
4th	No. 3	Marvin Wayne Wiggins	Democratic	2022	Bibb, Dallas, Hale, Perry, Wilcox	
5th	No. 1	Kevin M. Hall	Republican	2022	Chambers, Macon, Randolph, Tallapoosa	
5th	No. 2	Isaac Whorton	Republican	2024	Chambers, Macon, Randolph, Tallapoosa	
5th	No. 3	Steve Perryman	Republican	2024	Chambers, Macon, Randolph, Tallapoosa	
6th	No. 1	Brad Almond	Republican	2022	Tuscaloosa	
6th	No. 2	Jim Roberts Jr.	Republican	2024	Tuscaloosa	
6th	No. 3	Elizabeth Colwick Hamner	Republican	2024	Tuscaloosa	
6th	No. 4	Daniel F. Pruet	Republican	2024	Tuscaloosa	
6th	No. 5	Al May	Republican	2024	Tuscaloosa	
6th	No. 6	Dennis Steverson	Republican	2022	Tuscaloosa	
6th	No. 7	Vacant		2026	Tuscaloosa	Seat established in 2023
7th	No. 1	Dustin Merritt	Republican	2024	Calhoun, Cleburne	
7th	No. 2	Timothy C. Burgess	Republican	2024	Calhoun, Cleburne	
7th	No. 3	Jennifer Weems	Republican	2022	Calhoun, Cleburne	
7th	No. 4	Peggy P. Miller Lacher	Republican	2020	Calhoun, Cleburne	
7th	No. 5	Shannon C. Page	Republican	2022	Calhoun, Cleburne	
8th	No. 1	Jennifer Millwee Howell	Republican	2024	Morgan	
8th	No. 2	Charles B. Elliott	Republican	2024	Morgan	
8th	No. 3	Stephen Fate Brown	Republican	2024	Morgan	
9th	No. 1	Shaunathan Bell	Republican	2024	Cherokee, DeKalb	
9th	No. 2	Andrew Hairston	Republican	2024	Cherokee, DeKalb	
9th	No. 3	Jeremy Taylor	Republican	2022	Cherokee, DeKalb	
10th	No. 1	Anne L. Durward	Democratic	2022	Jefferson	
10th	No. 2	Shanta Owens	Democratic	2020	Jefferson	
10th	No. 3	Kechia Davis	Democratic	2020	Jefferson	
10th	No. 4	Javan Joielle Patton	Democratic	2022	Jefferson	
10th	No. 5	David Carpenter	Democratic	2024	Jefferson	
10th	No. 6	Chuck Price	Democratic	2024	Jefferson	
10th	No. 7	Tiara Young Hudson	Democratic	2024	Jefferson	
10th	No. 8	Marshell Jackson Hatcher	Democratic	2024	Jefferson	
10th	No. 9	Shera Craig Grant	Democratic	2024	Jefferson	
10th	No. 10	Patrick James Ballard	Democratic	2020	Jefferson	
10th	No. 11	Brendette Brown Green	Democratic	2022	Jefferson	
10th	No. 12	Thomas E. Thrash	Democratic	2022	Jefferson	
10th	No. 13	Frederic A. Bolling	Democratic	2024	Jefferson	
10th	No. 14	Vacant		2016	Jefferson	Seat abolished in 2022
10th	No. 15	Patricia Ann Stephens	Democratic	2024	Jefferson	
10th	No. 16	Kandice Pickett	Democratic	2022	Jefferson	
10th	No. 17	Elisabeth French	Democratic	2022	Jefferson	
10th	No. 18	Janine Hunt-Hilliard	Democratic	2024	Jefferson	
10th	No. 19	David J. Hobdy	Democratic	2022	Jefferson	
10th	No. 20	Alisha Ruffin May	Democratic	2022	Jefferson	
10th	No. 21	Monica Agee	Democratic	2022	Jefferson	
10th	No. 22	Tamara Harris Johnson	Democratic	2022	Jefferson	
10th	No. 23	Adrienne Moffett Powell	Democratic	2022	Jefferson	
10th	No. 24	Stephen Wallace	Democratic	2022	Jefferson	
10th	No. 25	Reginald L. Jeter	Democratic	2022	Jefferson	
10th	No. 26	Michael Streety	Democratic	2022	Jefferson	
10th	No. 27	Alaric May	Democratic	2024	Jefferson	
11th	No. 1	Benjamin Graves	Republican	2022	Lauderdale	
11th	No. 2	Will Powell	Republican	2022	Lauderdale	
11th	No. 3	Gil Self	Republican	2022	Lauderdale	
11th	No. 4	Carole Coil Medley	Republican	2024	Lauderdale	Seat established in 2023
12th	No. 1	Sonny Reagan	Republican	2024	Coffee, Pike	
12th	No. 2	Shannon R. Clark	Republican	2022	Coffee, Pike	
12th	No. 3	Jeff W. Kelley	Republican	2022	Coffee, Pike	
13th	No. 1	Wes Pipes	Republican	2024	Mobile	
13th	No. 2	Ben Brooks	Republican	2024	Mobile	
13th	No. 3	Michael Windom	Republican	2024	Mobile	
13th	No. 4	Jay York	Republican	2024	Mobile	
13th	No. 5	Walter Honeycutt	Republican	2024	Mobile	
13th	No. 6	Brandy B. Hambright	Republican	2024	Mobile	
13th	No. 7	Jill P. Phillips	Republican	2022	Mobile	
13th	No. 8	Edmond G. Naman	Republican	2024	Mobile	
13th	No. 9	Michael Sherman	Republican	2024	Mobile	
13th	No. 10	Michael A. Youngpeter	Republican	2024	Mobile	
13th	No. 11	Vicki Davis	Republican	2024	Mobile	
14th	No. 1	Joeletta Martin Barrentine	Republican	2020	Walker	
14th	No. 2	Doug Farris	Republican	2024	Walker	
14th	No. 3	Gregory M. Williams	Republican	2024	Walker	
15th	No. 1	Greg Griffin	Democratic	2022	Montgomery	
15th	No. 2	Brooke E. Reid	Democratic	2020	Montgomery	
15th	No. 3	Monica L. Arrington	Democratic	2022	Montgomery	
15th	No. 4	J. R. Gaines	Democratic	2020	Montgomery	
15th	No. 5	James H. Anderson	Democratic	2022	Montgomery	
15th	No. 6	Monet Mccorvey Gaines	Democratic	2024	Montgomery	
15th	No. 7	Lloria Munnerlyn James	Democratic	2020	Montgomery	
15th	No. 8	Calvin L. Williams	Democratic	2022	Montgomery	
15th	No. 9	Johnny Hardwick	Democratic	2020	Montgomery	
16th	No. 1	George C. Day	Republican	2024	Etowah	
16th	No. 2	Brynn Crain	Republican	2024	Etowah	
16th	No. 3	Sonny J. Steen	Republican	2024	Etowah	
16th	No. 4	Cody D. Robinson	Republican	2024	Etowah	
17th		Gregory S. Griggers	Democratic	2024	Greene, Marengo, Sumter	
18th	No. 1	Jonathan A. Spann	Republican	2022	Shelby	
18th	No. 2	Patrick E. Kennedy	Republican	2024	Shelby	
18th	No. 3	Bill Bostick	Republican	2022	Shelby	
18th	No. 4	Lara McCauley Alvis	Republican	2022	Shelby	
19th	No. 1	Patrick D. Pinkston	Republican	2024	Autauga, Chilton, Elmore	
19th	No. 2	Joy Pace Booth	Republican	2022	Autauga, Chilton, Elmore	
19th	No. 3	Amanda Baxley	Republican	2022	Autauga, Chilton, Elmore	
19th	No. 4	Dee Dee Calhoon	Republican	2024	Autauga, Chilton, Elmore	Seat established in 2023
19th	No. 5	Vacant		2026	Autauga, Chilton, Elmore	Seat established in 2023
20th	No. 1	John John Steensland	Republican	2024	Henry, Houston	
20th	No. 2	J. Kevin Moulton	Republican	2024	Henry, Houston	
20th	No. 3	Butch Binford	Republican	2022	Henry, Houston	
20th	No. 4	Chris Richardson	Republican	2022	Henry, Houston	
20th	No. 5	Todd Derrick	Republican	2020	Henry, Houston	
21st	No. 1	Jeff White	Republican	2024	Escambia	
21st	No. 2	Jeffrey Todd Stearns	Republican	2022	Escambia	
22nd	No. 1	Lex Short	Republican	2024	Covington	
22nd	No. 2	Benjamin M. Bowden	Republican	2022	Covington	
23rd	No. 1	Karen K. Hall	Republican	2024	Madison	
23rd	No. 2	Alison Austin	Republican	2020	Madison	
23rd	No. 3	Ruth Ann Hall	Republican	2024	Madison	
23rd	No. 4	Claude Hundley	Republican	2020	Madison	
23rd	No. 5	Donna S. Pate	Republican	2024	Madison	
23rd	No. 6	Chris Comer	Republican	2022	Madison	
23rd	No. 7	Alan Mann	Republican	2022	Madison	
23rd	No. 8	Patrick M. Tuten	Republican	2024	Madison	
23rd	No. 9	Don Rizzardi	Republican	2024	Madison	Seat established in 2023
24th		Sam Junkin	Republican	2022	Fayette, Lamar, Pickens	
25th	No. 1	Daryl Burt	Republican	2020	Marion, Winston	
25th	No. 2	Talmage Lee Carter	Republican	2024	Marion, Winston	
26th	No. 1	Zachary T. Collins	Democratic	2022	Russell	
26th	No. 2	David Johnson	Democratic	2020	Russell	
27th	No. 1	Christopher F. Abel	Republican	2022	Marshall	
27th	No. 2	Jay M. Mastin	Republican	2024	Marshall	
27th	No. 3	Matt Elliott	Republican	2024	Marshall	
28th	No. 1	Joseph Norton	Republican	2024	Baldwin	
28th	No. 2	Jody W. Bishop	Republican	2024	Baldwin	
28th	No. 3	J. Clark Stankoski	Republican	2024	Baldwin	
28th	No. 4	Scott P. Taylor	Republican	2022	Baldwin	
28th	No. 5	Carmen Bosch	Republican	2020	Baldwin	
28th	No. 6	Karol J. Kemp	Republican	2024	Baldwin	Seat established in 2023
28th	No. 7	Vacant		2026	Baldwin	Seat established in 2023
29th	No. 1	Chad E. Woodruff	Republican	2024	Talledega	
29th	No. 2	Will Hollingsworth	Republican	2024	Talledega	
30th	No. 1	Bill Weathington	Republican	2022	St. Clair	
30th	No. 2	James E. Hill III	Republican	2024	St. Clair	
31st	No. 1	Mitch Hays	Republican	2024	Colbert	
31st	No. 2	Kyle W. Brown	Republican	2024	Colbert	
32nd	No. 1	Gregory A. Nicholas	Republican	2024	Cullman	
32nd	No. 2	Emily Niezer Johnston	Republican	2024	Cullman	
33rd	No. 1	Bill Filmore	Republican	2024	Dale, Geneva	
33rd	No. 2	Kimberly A. Clark	Republican	2022	Dale, Geneva	
34th		Brian Hamilton	Republican	2024	Franklin	
35th		Jack Booker Weaver	Democratic	2024	Conecuh, Monroe	
36th		Callie Chenault Waldrep	Republican	2022	Lawrence	
37th	No. 1	Jeff Tickal	Republican	2022	Lee	
37th	No. 2	Chris Hughesk	Republican	2022	Lee	
37th	No. 3	Mike Fellows	Republican	2022	Lee	
37th	No. 4	Vacant		2026	Lee	Seat established in 2023
38th	No. 1	John Graham	Democratic	2024	Jackson	
38th	No. 2	Brent Benson	Republican	2020	Jackson	
39th	No. 1	Chad Wise	Republican	2022	Limestone	
39th	No. 2	Matthew R. Huggins	Republican	2022	Limestone	
40th		David F. Law	Republican	2024	Clay, Coosa	
41st		Greg Reid	Republican	2024	Blount	

== 1st Circuit ==
Counties Served: Choctaw, Clarke, Washington

Circuit Seats: Choctaw County Courthouse (Butler), Clarke County Courthouse (Grove Hill), Washington County Courthouse (Chatom)

Current Judges
Title	Name	Seat	Duty Station	Term	Seat up
Presiding Circuit Judge	Gaines C. McCorquodale	1	Grove Hill	2009–present	2022
Circuit Judge	Charles R. Montgomery	2	Chatom	2010–present	2022

== 2nd Circuit ==
Counties Served: Butler, Crenshaw, Lowndes

District Seats: Butler County Courthouse (Greenville), Crenshaw County Courthouse (Luverne), Lowndes County Courthouse (Hayneville)

Current Judge
Party	Title	Name	Duty Station	Term	Seat up
Republican	Presiding Circuit Judge	Cleve Poole	Greenville	2021–present	2030

== 3rd Circuit ==
Counties Served: Barbour, Bullock

District Seats: Barbour County Courthouse (Clayton), Bullock County Courthouse (Union Springs)

Current Judge
Title	Name	Duty Station	Term	Seat up
Presiding Circuit Judge	Leon Bernard Smithart	Union Springs	1999–present	2022

== 4th Circuit ==
Counties Served: Bibb, Dallas, Hale, Perry, Wilcox

District Seats: Bibb County Courthouse (Centreville), Dallas County Courthouse (Selma), Hale County Courthouse (Greensboro) Perry County Courthouse (Marion), Wilcox County Courthouse (Camden)

Current Judges
Title	Name	Seat	Duty Station	Term	Seat up
Presiding Circuit Judge	Marvin W. Wiggins	3	Greensboro	1999–present	2022
Circuit Judge	Collins Pettaway, Jr.	1	Selma	2013–present	2018
Circuit Judge	Donald McMillan	2			

== 5th Circuit ==
Counties Served: Chambers, Macon, Randolph, Tallapoosa

== 6th Circuit ==
Counties Served: Tuscaloosa

== 7th Circuit ==
Counties Served: Calhoun, Cleburne

== 8th Circuit ==
Counties Served: Morgan

== 9th Circuit ==
Counties Served: Cherokee, DeKalb

== 10th Circuit ==
Counties Served: Jefferson

== 11th Circuit ==
Counties Served: Lauderdale

== 12th Circuit ==
Counties Served: Coffee, Pike

== 13th Circuit ==
Counties Served: Mobile

== 14th Circuit ==
Counties Served: Walker

== 15th Circuit ==
Counties Served: Montgomery

== 16th Circuit ==
Counties Served: Etowah

== 17th Circuit ==
Counties Served: Greene, Marengo, Sumter

Judge Eddie Hardaway is the only Judge covering all three Counties

== 18th Circuit ==
Counties Served: Shelby

== 19th Circuit ==
Counties Served: Autauga, Chilton, Elmore

== 20th Circuit ==
Counties Served: Henry, Houston

== 21st Circuit ==
Counties Served: Escambia

== 22nd Circuit ==
Counties Served: Covington

== 23rd Circuit ==
Counties Served: Madison

== 24th Circuit ==
Judge: Sam Junkin

Counties Served: Fayette, Lamar, and Pickens.

District Seats: Fayette Courthouse (Fayette), Lamar Courthouse (Vernon), Pickens Courthouse (Carrollton).

== 25th Circuit ==
Counties Served: Marion, Winston

== 26th Circuit ==
Counties Served: Russell

Current Judges
Party	Title	Name	Seat	Duty Station	Term	Seat up
Democratic	Presiding Circuit Judge	Michael Bellamy	1	Phenix City	2013–present	2022
Democratic	Circuit Judge	Albert David Johnson	2	Phenix City	2014–present	2026

== 27th Circuit ==
Counties Served: Marshall

== 28th Circuit ==
Counties Served: Baldwin

Circuit Court Judges

Carmen Bosch, Jody W. Bishop, C. Joseph Norton, Scott P. Taylor, J. Clark Stankoski

== 29th Circuit ==
Counties Served: Talledega

== 30th Circuit ==
Counties Served: St. Clair

== 31st Circuit ==
Counties Served: Colbert

== 32nd Circuit ==
Counties Served: Cullman

== 33rd Circuit ==
Counties Served: Dale, Geneva

== 34th Circuit ==
Counties Served: Franklin

== 35th Circuit ==
Counties Served: Conecuh, Monroe

== 36th Circuit ==
Counties Served: Lawrence

== 37th Circuit ==
Counties Served: Lee

== 38th Circuit ==
Counties Served: Jackson

Current Judges
Party	Title	Name	Term	Seat up	Source
Democratic	Presiding Circuit Judge	John Graham	2006-Present	2030	
Republican	Circuit Judge	Brent Benson	2020-Present	2026	

== 39th Circuit ==
Counties Served: Limestone

== 40th Circuit ==
Counties Served: Clay, Coosa

== 41st Circuit ==
Counties Served: Blount

== See also ==
- Courts of Alabama
- Supreme Court of Alabama
- Alabama Court of Criminal Appeals
- Alabama Court of Civil Appeals
