= Rick Pate =

American politician (born 1955)

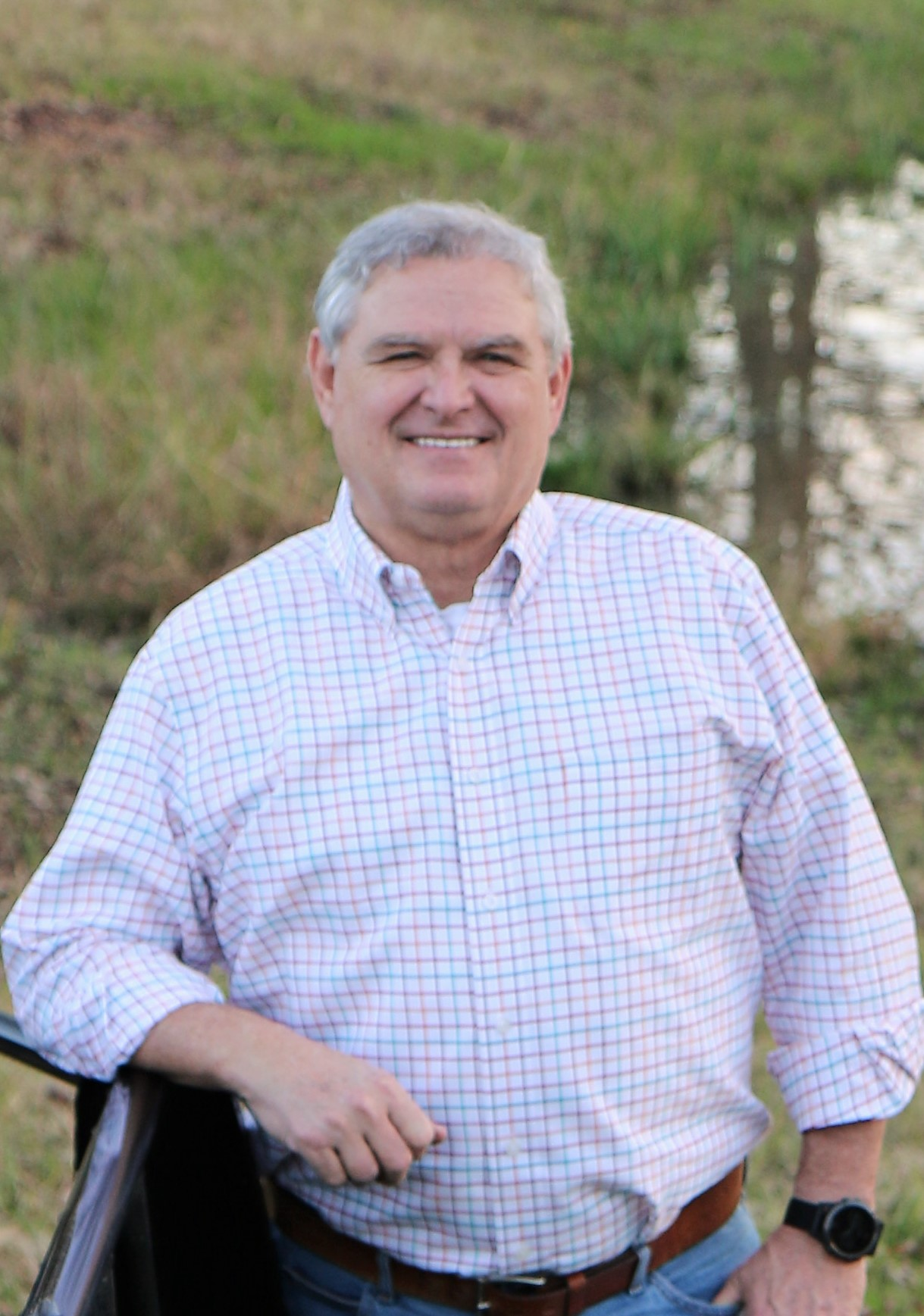

30th Agriculture Commissioner of Alabama
- Incumbent
- Assumed office January 14, 2019
- Governor: Kay Ivey
- Preceded by: John McMillan

Personal details
- Born: April 6, 1955 (age 71) Fort Rucker, Alabama, U.S.
- Party: Republican
- Spouse: Julie Dismukes
- Children: 2
- Education: Auburn University (BS)

Rick Pate (born April 6, 1955) is an American politician serving as the 30th Commissioner of Agriculture and Industries in Alabama. He previously served as mayor of Lowndesboro, Alabama from 2004 until his election as Commissioner of Agriculture and Industries in January 2019. He also served as chair of the Lowndes County Republican Party.

Pate graduated from Auburn University School of Agriculture in 1978. He is married to Julie Dismukes and they have two children.

He served as an elector pledged to Donald Trump and JD Vance in the 2024 Presidential Election.

On June 2, 2025, he announced his candidacy for Alabama Lieutenant Governor in the upcoming 2026 Republican Primary.

== Electoral history ==
Pate finished first in the Republican Primary in June 2018 and then won the runoff for Agriculture Commissioner of Alabama. In November 2018, he was unopposed in the general election receiving more than 97% of the vote and began his term of office on January 14, 2019

2018 Agriculture & Industries Republican primary results
Party	Candidate	Votes	%
Republican	Rick Pate	181,637	40.4%
Republican	Gerald Dial	134,868	30.0%
Republican	Cecil Murphy	77,363	17.2%
Republican	Tracy "T.O." Crane	56,007	12.4%
Total votes		449,875	100.0%

2018 Agriculture & Industries Republican primary runoff results
Party	Candidate	Votes	%
Republican	Rick Pate	176,739	56.7%
Republican	Gerald Dial	134,935	43.3%
Total votes		311,674	100%

Party political offices
Preceded by John McMillan	Republican nominee for Agriculture Commissioner of Alabama; 2018, 2022	Most recent
Political offices
Preceded by John McMillan	Agriculture Commissioner of Alabama; 2019–present	Incumbent
