= John McMillan (Alabama politician) =

American politician (born 1941)

40th Treasurer of Alabama
- In office January 14, 2019 – September 30, 2021
- Governor: Kay Ivey
- Preceded by: Young Boozer
- Succeeded by: Young Boozer

29th Agriculture Commissioner of Alabama
- In office January 17, 2011 – January 14, 2019
- Governor: Robert Bentley; Kay Ivey
- Preceded by: Ron Sparks
- Succeeded by: Rick Pate

Member of the Alabama House of Representatives from the 95th district
- In office 1974–1982
- Succeeded by: Steve McMillan

Personal details
- Born: John Murphy McMillan Jr. July 6, 1941 (age 85) Bay Minette, Alabama, U.S.
- Party: Democratic (formerly); Republican
- Spouse: Kathryn McMillan
- Children: 2
- Education: Rhodes College (BA)

John Murphy McMillan Jr. (born July 6, 1941) is an American politician who served as the 40th treasurer of Alabama. He was elected as a Republican in November 2010 to the office of Alabama Commissioner of Agriculture and Industries. He was elected to a second four-year term in 2014. In 2018, McMillan won the Republican primary election for State Treasurer, and had no Democratic opposition on the general election ballot.

== Political career ==
McMillan served as a Baldwin County Commissioner and as an Alabama state representative (elected in 1974 and 1978) representing Baldwin and Mobile counties as a Democrat. While in the Alabama state legislature McMillan chaired the Agriculture, Forestry and Natural Resources Committee and was selected twice as the Alabama Wildlife Federation's "Conservation Legislator of the Year." Recently McMillan founded the Alabama Sportsmen's Caucus to serve as an advocate group for the outdoors business industry and for the rights of hunters, gun owners, and fishermen.

McMillan served as the Alabama State Commissioner of Conservation and Natural Resources in the first administration of Gov. Fob James (1979–1983). As Commissioner, McMillan won widespread praise for his part in the creation of the Alabama Trust Fund (originally called the Alabama Heritage Trust Fund), a plan to save the receipts from leases of offshore oil operations. This fund has grown from the original investment of just over $400 million to a sum approaching $4 billion. Additionally, McMillan spearheaded the rebuilding of Gulf State Park after the widespread destruction of Hurricane Frederic.

McMillan is the former chief executive (1985–2006) of the Alabama Forestry Association where he was a leader in the successful fight to defeat the Amendment One Tax Increase of 2003. As the head of this powerful statewide association, McMillan became known as an advocate for the rights of property owners and a consistent opponent of property tax increases.

McMillan was named to the Alabama State Personnel Board by Governor Fob James during the 1990s and reappointed to a second term by Governor Bob Riley. On the State Personnel Board McMillan has played a leading role in investigating alleged "kickbacks" to state employee union bosses.

On November 2, 2010, McMillan defeated Democrat Glen Zorn for the post of Alabama Commissioner of Agriculture and Industries. McMillan received 862,901 votes to Zorn's 583,255.

In June 2018, McMillan won Alabama's Republican primary election for the office of State Treasurer, besting two challengers. No Democrats qualified for the primary ballot, practically guaranteeing McMillan's victory in November's general election. He resigned on September 30, 2021 to serve as the executive director of the Alabama Medical Cannabis Commission, and was replaced by his predecessor Young Boozer.

== Education and personal life ==
John McMillan is a native of rural Stockton, Alabama, where he worked as a boy (and as a young man after returning from college ) on his uncle's farm and in his father's sawmill. McMillan is a graduate of Rhodes College in Memphis. McMillan and his wife Kathryn have two grown sons, Murphy and William, and two grandchildren. McMillan is an avid outdoorsman who won the Governor's One-Shot Turkey Hunt in 2006. He is known as a dedicated hunter of deer, wild turkey, and other Alabama game, and also enjoys fishing with his family. His twin brother Steve McMillan died in April 2022.

== Electoral history ==
Alabama Commissioner of Agriculture and Industries Republican Primary Election, 2010
Party	Candidate	Votes	%
Republican	John McMillan	151,177	36.53
Republican	Dorman Grace	145,524	35.17
Republican	Dale Peterson	117,091	28.30

Alabama Commissioner of Agriculture and Industries Republican Primary Runoff Election, 2010
Party	Candidate	Votes	%
Republican	John McMillan	216,824	51.90
Republican	Dorman Grace	200,595	48.10

Alabama Commissioner of Agriculture and Industries Election, 2010
Party	Candidate	Votes	%
Republican	John McMillan	862,901	59.61
Democratic	Glen Zorn	583,255	40.29
Write-ins	Write-ins	1,405	0.10

Alabama Commissioner of Agriculture and Industries Election, 2014
Party	Candidate	Votes	%
Republican	John McMillan (inc.)	734,428	64.67
Democratic	Doug "New Blue" Smith	400,299	35.25
Write-ins	Write-ins	970	0.10

Alabama State Treasurer Republican Primary Election, 2018
Party	Candidate	Votes	%
Republican	John McMillan	273,374	61.18
Republican	David L. Black	95,454	21.36
Republican	Stephen D. Evans	78,010	17.46

Party political offices
Preceded by Albert Lipscomb	Republican nominee for Agriculture Commissioner of Alabama; 2010, 2014	Succeeded by Rick Pate
Preceded by Young Boozer	Republican nominee for Alabama State Treasurer; 2018	Succeeded by Young Boozer
Political offices
Preceded by Ron Sparks	Agriculture Commissioner of Alabama; 2011–2019	Succeeded by Rick Pate
Preceded by Young Boozer	Treasurer of Alabama; 2019–2021	Succeeded by Young Boozer
