= Young Boozer =

American public servant (born 1948)

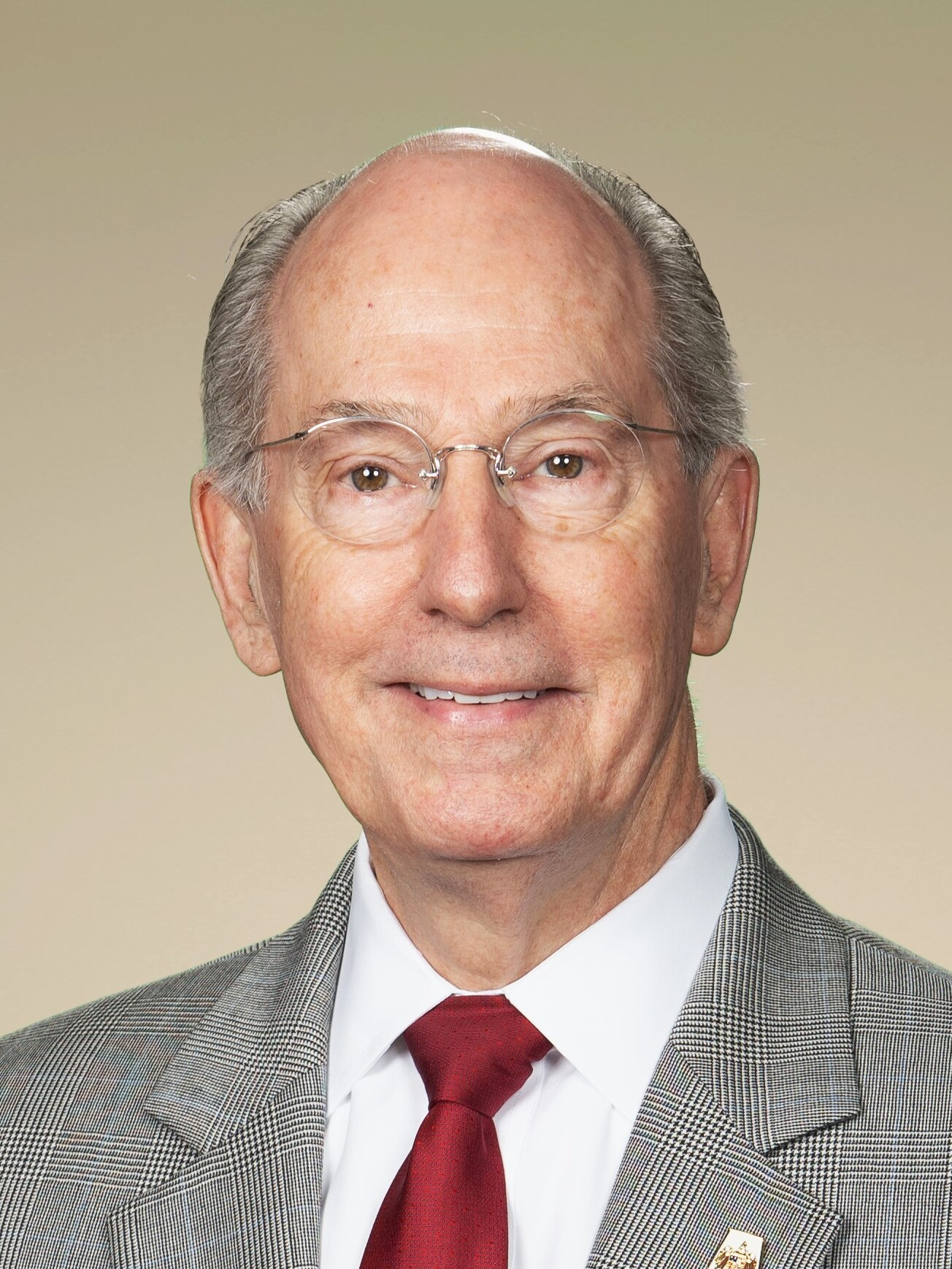
- Boozer in 2023

39th and 41st Treasurer of Alabama
- Incumbent
- Assumed office October 7, 2021
- Governor: Kay Ivey; Tommy Tuberville (elect)
- Preceded by: John McMillan
- In office January 17, 2011 – January 14, 2019
- Governor: Robert J. Bentley; Kay Ivey
- Preceded by: Kay Ivey
- Succeeded by: John McMillan

Personal details
- Born: Young Jacob Boozer III; November 23, 1948 (age 77) Birmingham, Alabama, U.S.
- Party: Republican
- Education: Stanford University (BA); University of Pennsylvania (MBA)

Young Jacob Boozer III (born November 23, 1948) is an American public servant currently serving as the 41st State Treasurer of Alabama, an office to which he was appointed by Governor Kay Ivey in 2021. He was previously the 39th State Treasurer, serving between 2011 and 2019.

Boozer is a member of the National Association of State Treasurers (NAST), serving as Chair of the Banking and Cash Management Committee. He also serves on the Governance Committee of the College Savings Plans Network. In 2019, he received the Lucille Maurer Award for outstanding service to NAST.

== Early life and education ==
Boozer was born in Birmingham and raised in Tuscaloosa. He became an Eagle Scout in 1962. He earned a bachelor's degree in economics in 1971 from Stanford University and a master's degree in finance from the Wharton School at the University of Pennsylvania in 1973.

Boozer was named after his father and grandfather. His father played football for the University of Alabama, and is a member of the Alabama Sports Hall of Fame and the Alabama Business Hall of Fame. His grandfather was mayor of Samson, Alabama, from 1916 to 1919.

== Career ==
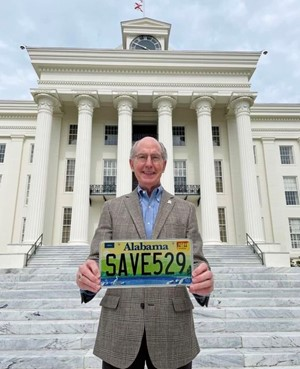
Boozer promoting Alabama's 529 college savings plan

Prior to serving in public office, Boozer spent 35 years in banking, finance and investments, which took him from Citibank in New York and Crocker National Bank in Los Angeles to Coral Petroleum in Houston and Colonial Bank in Montgomery. From 2003 to 2017, he was a part-owner of the Montgomery Biscuits, a minor-league affiliate of the Tampa Bay Rays. In 2002, Boozer was recognized with the Distinguished Eagle Scout Award by the Boy Scouts of America.

After retiring from banking in 2007, Boozer became Deputy State Finance Director for Alabama Governor Bob Riley. During his tenure in the Alabama Department of Finance, he played a key role in saving millions of taxpayer dollars through the restructuring of state bond debt and derivatives. He left the Riley administration in early 2010 to run for State Treasurer in his first race for elected office.

=== Treasurer of Alabama ===
After completing his second consecutive term as Treasurer in 2019, Boozer became Assistant Superintendent of the Alabama State Banking Department and a member of Governor Ivey's Study Group on Gambling Policy. On October 1, 2021, Ivey reappointed Boozer as State Treasurer for the remainder of John McMillan's term, McMillan having resigned to serve as the executive director of the Alabama Medical Cannabis Commission. Boozer was reelected to the office in 2022.

== Electoral history ==
Alabama Treasurer Republican Primary Election, 2010
Party	Candidate	Votes	%
Republican	Young Boozer	305,467	64.76
Republican	George Wallace Jr.	166,206	35.23

Alabama Treasurer Election, 2010
Party	Candidate	Votes	%
Republican	Young Boozer	875,965	60.04
Democratic	Charley Grimsley	581,930	39.89
Write-ins	Write-ins	1,030	0.07

Alabama Treasurer Election, 2014
Party	Candidate	Votes	%
Republican	Young Boozer	748,876	98.01
Write-ins	Write-ins	15,224	1.99

Alabama Treasurer Election, 2022
Party	Candidate	Votes	%
Republican	Young Boozer	946,936	83.74
Libertarian	Scott Hammond	175,034	15.48
Write-ins	Write-ins	8,855	0.78

== Name ==
Boozer's combined given name and surname are the same as the humorous phrase "young boozer", which would refer to a young person who habitually drinks alcohol. In April 2010, The Tonight Show mentioned Boozer in a segment, with host Jay Leno poking fun at his unique name. Boozer, who was at that time seeking to be elected for State Treasurer of Alabama, reacted by admitting that his name does get attention but expressed a desire for people to focus on his qualifications for the role. He later described the shoutout as "the best thing that ever happened to me" and mentioned that local university students were grabbing his roadside campaign signs and putting them up in dorm rooms and frat house bars.

Party political offices
Preceded by Kay Ivey	Republican nominee for Alabama State Treasurer; 2010, 2014	Succeeded by John McMillan
Preceded by John McMillan	Republican nominee for Alabama State Treasurer; 2022, 2026	Most recent
Political offices
Preceded by Kay Ivey	Treasurer of Alabama; 2011–2019	Succeeded by John McMillan
Preceded by John McMillan	Treasurer of Alabama; 2021–present	Incumbent
