= Alabama Department of Agriculture and Industries =

Agency of the U.S. state of Alabama

- Seal of the Alabama Department of Agriculture and Industries

Independent agency overview
- Formed: February 23, 1883
- Jurisdiction: Alabama
- Employees: 300 full-time and 250 part-time
- Annual budget: $25 million
- Minister responsible: Rick Pate
- Independent agency executive: Commissioner
- Website: agi.alabama.gov

The Alabama Department of Agriculture and Industries (ADAI) is an independent agency of the government of Alabama first created by an Act of the State Legislature on February 23, 1883. The Department is responsible for serving farmers and consumers of agricultural products and operates with an annual budget of just under $25 million. The Department has about 300 full-time employees and 250 part-time employees.

== Commissioners ==
The Department is under the direction and supervision of the Commissioner of Agriculture and Industries. The first Commissioner was Edward C. Betts of Madison County and he was appointed by then Governor of Alabama, Edward A. O'Neal. In 1891, the legislature changed it to a statewide elected office chosen in partisan elections, but allowing the Governor to fill vacancies that occur during a term due to death or resignation. Commissioners have always been eligible to serve an unlimited number of terms, but not consecutively. Beginning with the 1970 election Commissioners were then allowed to serve two consecutive terms.

The current and 30th Commissioner is Rick Pate of Lowndes County who was elected in November, 2018 and assumed office on January 14, 2019. His immediate predecessor and the 29th Commissioner was John McMillan, a Republican first elected in November 2010 and not eligible to seek a third consecutive term. Commissioner McMillan previously worked for the Alabama Forestry Commission. Jack Thompson was the first Republican elected Commissioner. Both Commissioners Pete Gilmer and McMillan Lane were first appointed to office by Governor George C. Wallace upon the death of their predecessors. A. W. Todd not only has the distinction of being the only Commissioner to serve three terms, but he was both the youngest and the oldest Commissioner. The following is a list of all the commissioners:

- Rick Pate (R) (2019–present)
- John McMillan (R) (2011–2019)
- Ron Sparks (D) (2003–2011)
- Charles Bishop (D) (1999–2003)
- Jack Thompson (R) (1995–1999)
- A. W. Todd (D) (1991–1995)
- Albert McDonald (D) (1983–1991)
- McMillan Lane (D) (1974–1983)
- M. D. "Pete" Gilmer (D) (1972–1974) (died in office)
- Richard Beard (D) (1967–1972) (died in office)
- A. W. Todd (D) (1963–1967)
- R. L. "Red" Bamberg (D) (1959–1963)
- A. W. Todd (D) (1955–1959)
- Frank McLean Stewart (D) (1951–1955)
- Haygood Paterson (D) (1947–1951)
- Joseph N. Polle (D) (1943–1947)
- Haygood Paterson (D) (1939–1943)
- R.J. Goode (D) (1935–1939)
- Seth Paddock Storrs (D) (1931–1935)
- S.M. Dunwoody (D) (1927–1931)
- J.M. Moore (D) (1923–1927)
- Miles C. Allgood (D) (1919–1923)
- James A. Wade (D) (1915–1919)
- Reuben F. Kolb (D) (1911–1915)
- Joseph A. Wilkinson (D) (1907–1911)
- Robert R. Polle (D) (1900–1907)
- Isaac F. Culver (D) (1896–1900)
- Hector D. Lane (D) (1891–1896)
- Reuben F. Kolb (D) (1887–1891)
- Edward C. Betts (D) (1883–1887)

== Organization ==
The Commissioner is assisted in managing the Department by a Deputy Commissioner and Chief of Staff, two Deputy Commissioners and one Assistant Commissioner.

- Commissioner of Agriculture and Industries
  - Deputy Commissioner and Chief of Staff
    - Deputy Commissioner
      - Food and Safety Division
        - Food Safety Section
        - Weights and Measures Section
        - Pesticide Management Section
    - Deputy Commissioner
      - Agricultural and Animal Protection Division
        - Animal Industry Section
        - Plant Industry Section
        - Agricultural Promotions Section
        - Agricultural Mediation Section
        - Agricultural Statistics Section
    - Assistant Commissioner
      - Executive Division
        - Accounting Section
        - General Services Section
        - Personnel Section
        - Public Relations Section
        - Agricultural Economics Section
        - Agricultural Homeland Security Section

== See also ==
- United States Department of Agriculture
