= Alabama State Treasurer =

State of Alabama government position

State Treasurer of Alabama
- Seal of the state treasurer of Alabama

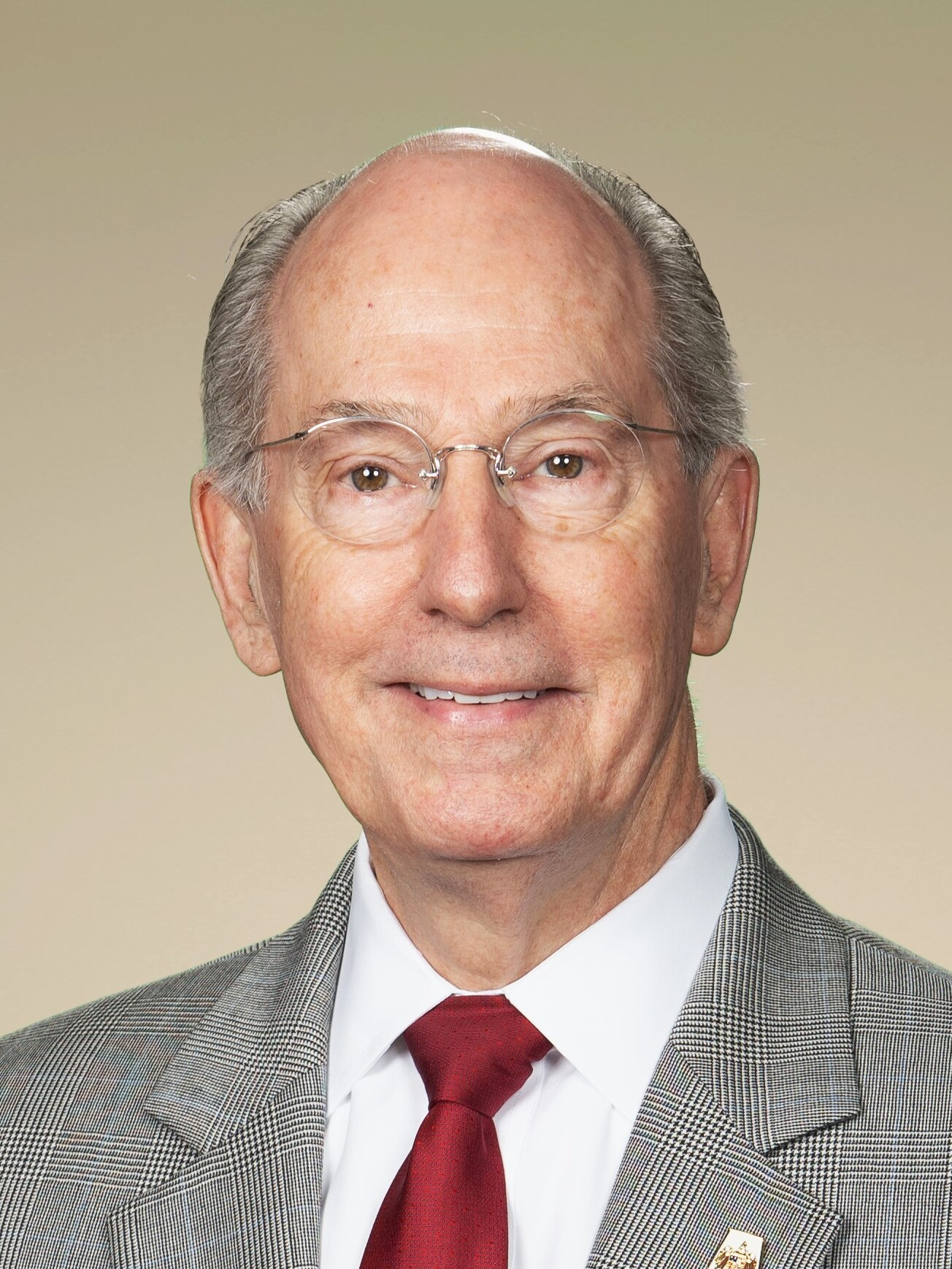
- Incumbent; Young Boozer since October 1, 2021
- Style: The Honorable
- Term length: Four years, renewable once consecutively
- Inaugural holder: Jack Ross; 1819
- Formation: Alabama Constitution
- Succession: Seventh
- Website: State Treasurer's Office

The Alabama state treasurer acts as the head banker for the State of Alabama, handling deposits, withdrawals, redemptions of state warrants and investments of state funds. The position was created in 1819 when Alabama became a state. Its constitution established the Office of the Treasurer of State, a position to be elected by the legislature. Individuals serving as state treasurer were elected annually by the General Assembly from 1819 to 1861. Beginning in 1861, the treasurer was elected biennially from until 1868 and was elected by popular vote for a term of two years in 1868. Arthur Bingham's election in 1868 marked the first time a Republican would hold the office. Kay Ivey in 2002 became the second Republican to hold the office. The treasurer began to be elected to a four-year term as a result of the 1901 Constitution but could not serve successive terms until a 1968 amendment. In 1950, Sibyl Pool (D) would become the first of seven different women to be elected state treasurer.

The 40th and most recent Alabama state treasurer is Republican John McMillan, who took office on January 14, 2019. However, McMillan announced on September 17, 2021, that he would resign effective September 30, 2021, to take a position as executive director with the Alabama Medical Marijuana Commission. Governor Ivey immediately announced that she would appoint McMillan's predecessor, Young Boozer, to fill the remainder of the term beginning on October 1, 2021. Boozer stood for, and won, re-election in 2022.

== List of treasurers ==
#	Name	Term
1	Jack Ross	1819–1822
2	John Perry	1822–1829
3	Hardin Perkins	1829–1834
4	William Hawn	1834–1840
5	Samuel Frierson	1840–1846
6	William Graham	1846–1860
7	Duncan Graham	1860–1865
8	Lyd Saxon	1865–1868
9	Arthur Bingham	1868–1870
10	James Grant	1870–1872
11	Arthur Bingham	1872–1874
12	Daniel Crawford	1874–1878
13	Isaac Vincent	1878–1883
14	Frederick Smith	1883–1888
15	John Cobbs	1888–1892
16	J. Craig Smith	1892–1896
17	George Ellis	1896–1900
18	J. Craig Smith	1900–1907
19	Walter D. Seed Sr.	1907–1911
20	John Purifoy	1911–1915
21	William Lancaster	1915–1919
22	Robert Bradley	1919–1923
23	George Ellis	1923–1927
24	William Allgood	1927–1931
25	Sidney Blann	1931–1935
26	Charles McCall	1939–1941
27	Walter Lusk	1941–1947
28	John Brandon	1947–1951
29	Sibyl Pool	1951–1955
30	John Brandon	1955–1959
31	Agnes Baggett	1959–1963
32	Mary Texas Hurt Garner	1963–1967
33	Agnes Baggett	1967–1975
34	Melba Till Allen	1975–1978
35	Annie Laurie Gunter	1978–1987
36	George Wallace Jr.	1987–1995
37	Lucy Baxley	1995–2003
38	Kay Ivey	2003–2011
39	Young Boozer	2011–2019
40	John McMillan	2019–2021
41	Young Boozer	2021–present
