= Kristin Goodwin =

United States Air Force general

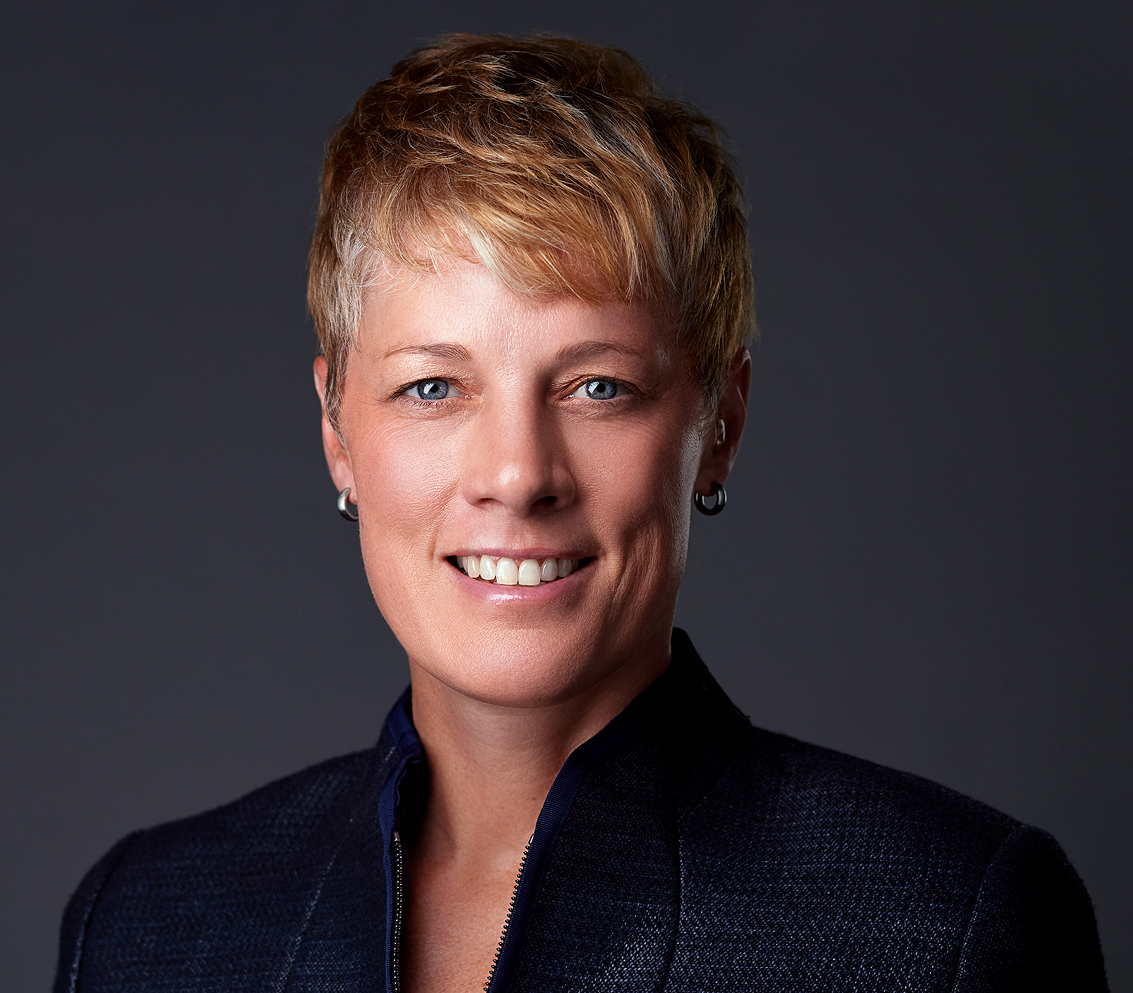
- Undated post-military photo
- Nickname: Duchess
- Born: Pittsburgh, Pennsylvania, US
- Branch: United States Air Force
- Years: 1993 – early 2020s
- Rank: Brigadier general
- Commands: 509 OSS (2009–11); 2nd Bomb Wing (2014–16); 34th Training Wing (2017–19)
- Awards: Legion of Merit; Meritorious Service Medal; Air Medal
- Education: US Air Force Academy (BS); George Washington U. (MA)
- Spouses: Kelly Fisher (divorced); Traci Paulsen
- Children: Two daughters

Kristin Elizabeth Goodwin is an American retired brigadier general and aviator of the United States Air Force, the first female commander of any bomber wing.

A graduate of the Air Force Academy, she was a transport and then bomber command pilot before assuming organizational commands. She served as the academy's first openly gay commandant of cadets, a post from which she was removed due to an Inspector General investigation. Goodwin went on to be chief of staff of the United States Space Force's Space Operations Command. She retired in or before April 2024.

== Personal life ==
Kristin Elizabeth Goodwin was born in Pittsburgh, Pennsylvania. Her father retired from active-duty in the US Coast Guard after 30 years, and her mother retired from the Air Force Reserve after 20 years. As a Coast Guard brat who moved frequently, she claimed Fairfax, Virginia as her home town because she attended high school there.

Goodwin is openly gay. As of March 2019, she was married to Kelly Goodwin (née Fisher)—a professional cyclist and former firefighter; they had two daughters and divorced in 2020. Goodwin's blog says she later married Traci Paulsen on 17 December 2021; according to American Marriage Ministries, they wed in Colorado Springs, Colorado on 9 July 2022.

An athlete, Goodwin has competed in five marathons, as well as Ironman Triathlons and the Bataan Memorial Death March.

== Military career ==
=== Education ===
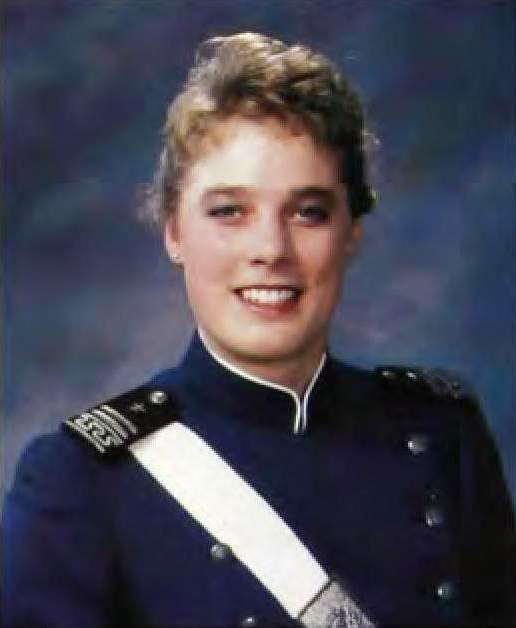
Cadet Goodwin (c. 1993)

Goodwin received her Bachelor of Science in mechanical engineering from the United States Air Force Academy in 1993. In 2001, she received her Master of Arts in business and organizational management from George Washington University.

=== Pilot ===
On 2 June 1993, Goodwin was commissioned as a second lieutenant in the United States Air Force; from August 1993 through January 1994, her first assignment was as the Assistant Deputy Executive Officer for Professional Military Studies at her alma mater, the Air Force Academy. She then completed flight training for the Cessna T-37 Tweet, Raytheon T-1 Jayhawk, and Lockheed C-130 Hercules at Laughlin and Little Rock Air Force Bases from January 1994 through August 1995.

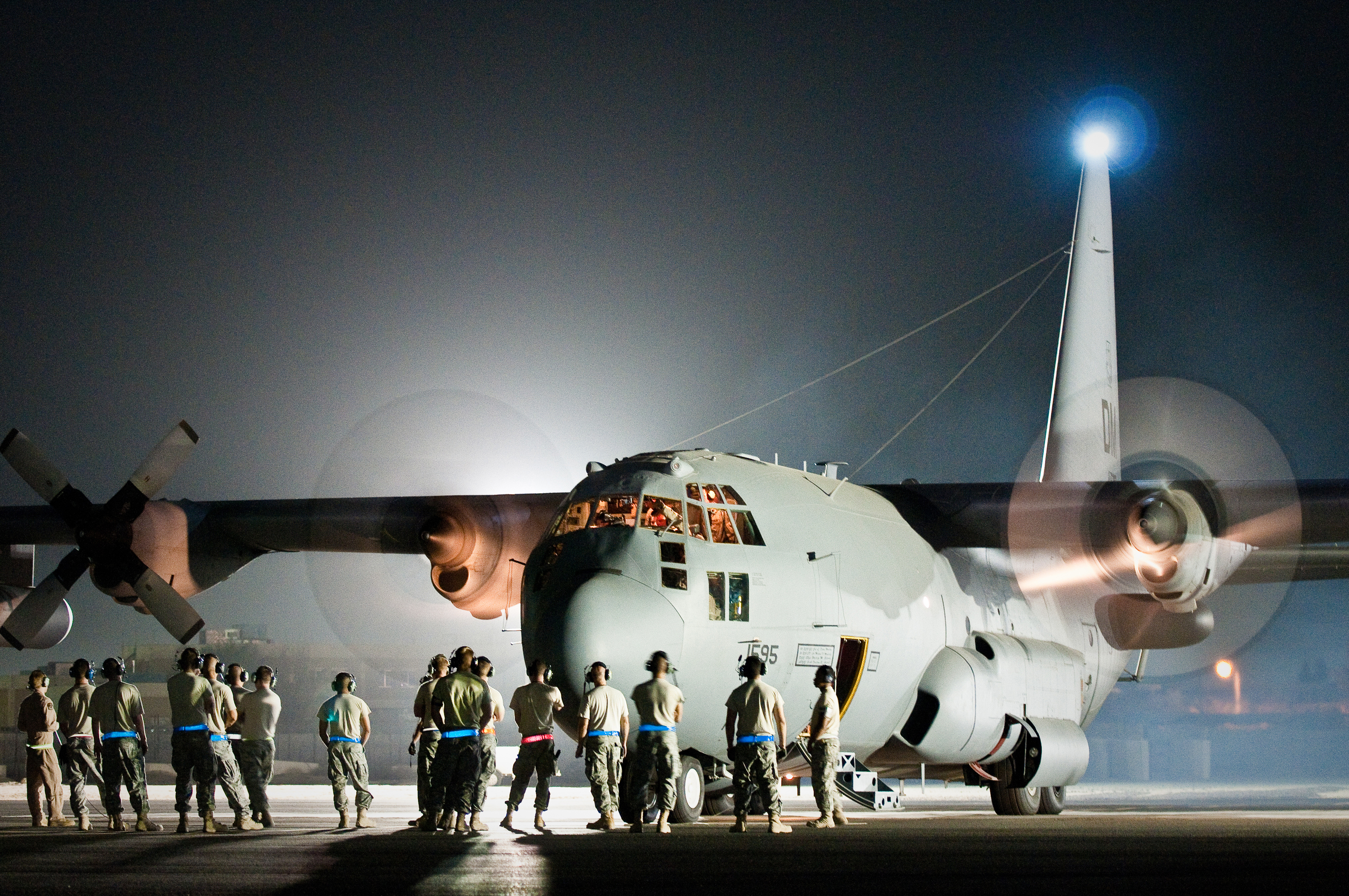
An EC-130H in 2010

In August 1995, then-First Lieutenant Goodwin was assigned to the 41st Electronic Combat Squadron at Davis–Monthan Air Force Base as the commander of a Lockheed EC-130H Compass Call. In February 1998, now a captain, she became an EC-130 instructor and the Operations Executive Officer of Davis–Monthan's 355th Operations Group. From July 1999 through June 2001, Captain Goodwin worked in the Pentagon offices of the Secretary of the Air Force and the Chairman of the Joint Chiefs of Staff, General Hugh Shelton, as part of the Air Force Intern Program.

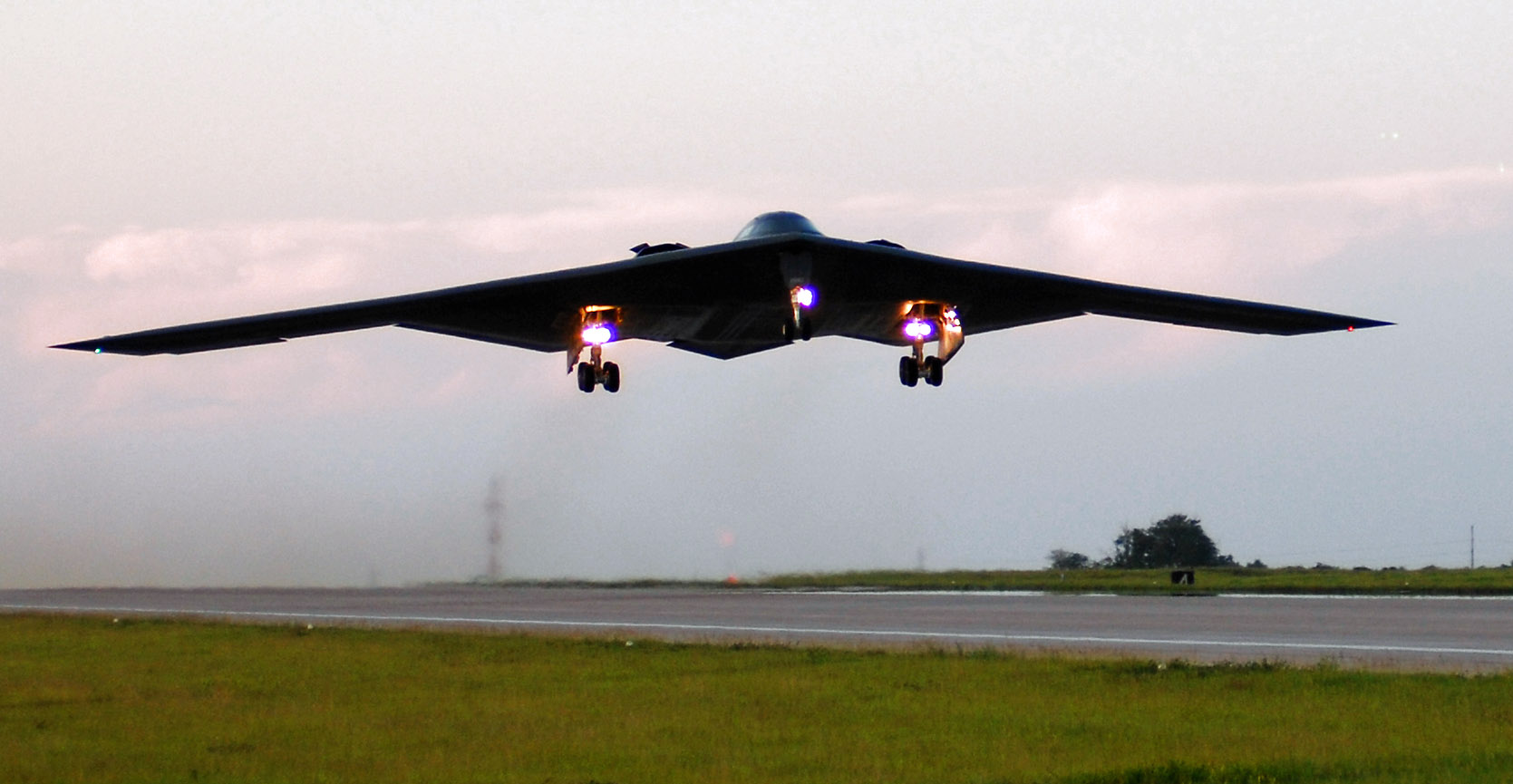
A B-2 at Whiteman

Goodwin was stationed at Whiteman Air Force Base from June 2001 through July 2006. For her first year, Goodwin's duties with the 394th Combat Training Squadron included training on the Northrop Grumman B-2 Spirit and flying the Northrop T-38 Talon. From June 2002 through November 2004, Goodwin was a flight commander with the 325th Bomb Squadron, flying T-38s and acting as mission commander on B-2 sorties. November 2004 through December 2005 saw then-Major Goodwin teaching B-2 pilots and still flying T-38s with the 509th Operations Support Squadron (509 OSS); through July 2006 she added to her plate: Chief of Combat Plans for the 509th Bomb Wing.

As of November 2018, Goodwin was rated as a command pilot, having over 2900 flight hours in the T-37, T-1, C-130, EC-130, B-2, T-38, and B-52. Her B-2 aviator call sign is "Duchess".

=== Command ===
Major Goodwin returned to the Pentagon in July 2006 to work under the Chief of Staff of the United States Air Force, General T. Michael Moseley. A year later, she was hand-picked to transfer to Camp H. M. Smith and work as the deputy director of the United States Pacific Command's Commander's Action Group under Admiral Timothy J. Keating. Come August 2009, Lieutenant Colonel Goodwin returned to Whiteman as the director of operations for the 393rd Bomb Squadron while evaluating B-2 pilots. After eleven months, she was elevated to commander of the 509th OSS.

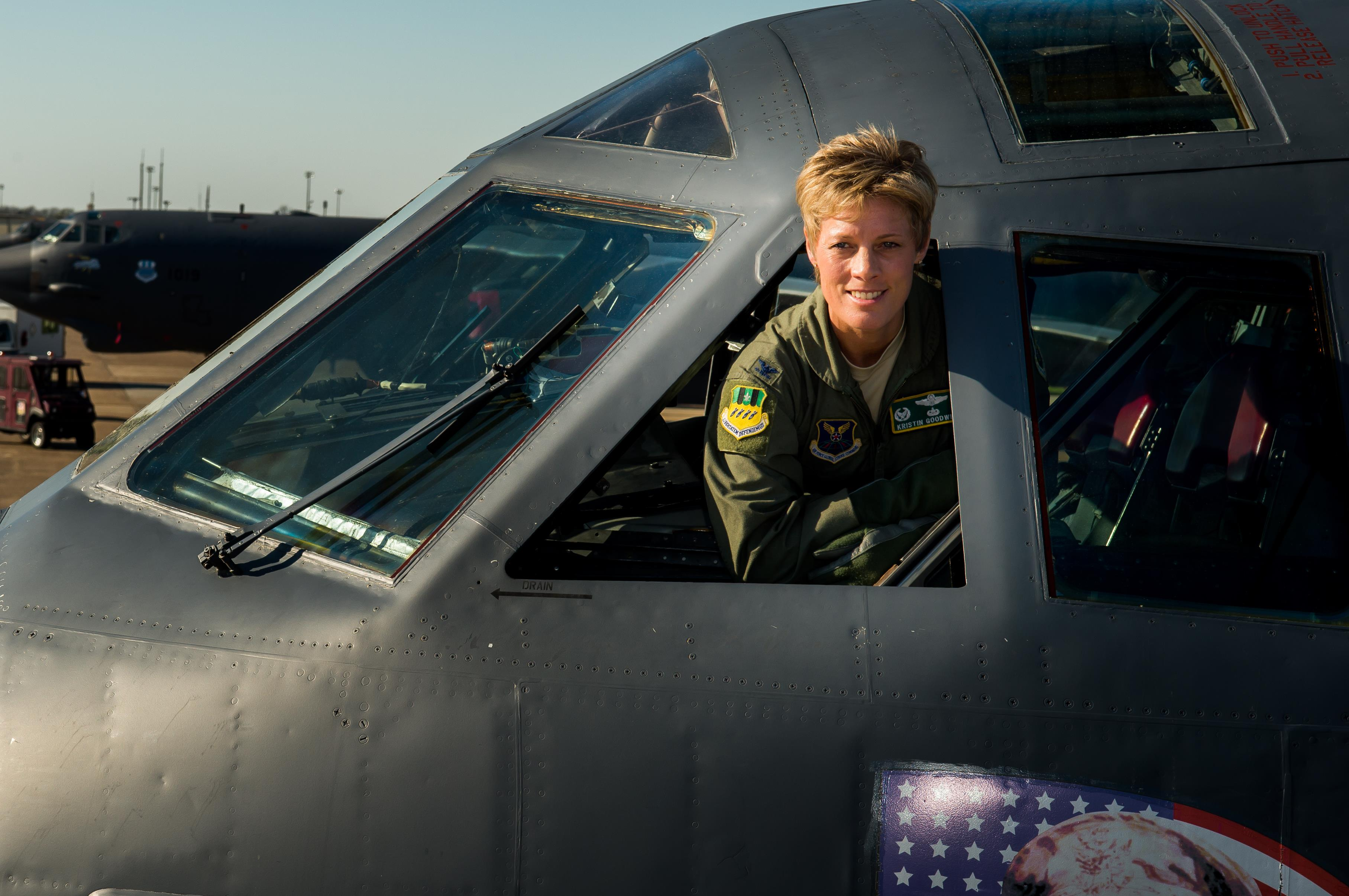
Col Goodwin, CC, 2 BW (2016)

From June 2011 through June 2012, Goodwin served as the executive officer to the Air Combat Command commander, General Gilmary M. Hostage III, after which she was a Center for Strategic and International Studies fellow from June 2012 through June 2013. Colonel Goodwin was then reassigned to Whiteman as the vice commander of the 509th Bomb Wing from June 2013 through August 2014, before becoming commander of the 2nd Bomb Wing (2 BW) at Barksdale Air Force Base for 22 months—the first woman to command any Air Force bomber wing. While heading the 2 BW, Goodwin oversaw the first reintroduction of the Boeing B-52 Stratofortress to combat in ten years, as well as helped plan Operation Odyssey Dawn's first night of shock and awe operations. After leaving Louisiana in May 2016, Goodwin was the senior military assistant to Secretaries of the Air Force Deborah Lee James and Lisa Disbrow.

==== Academy commandant ====
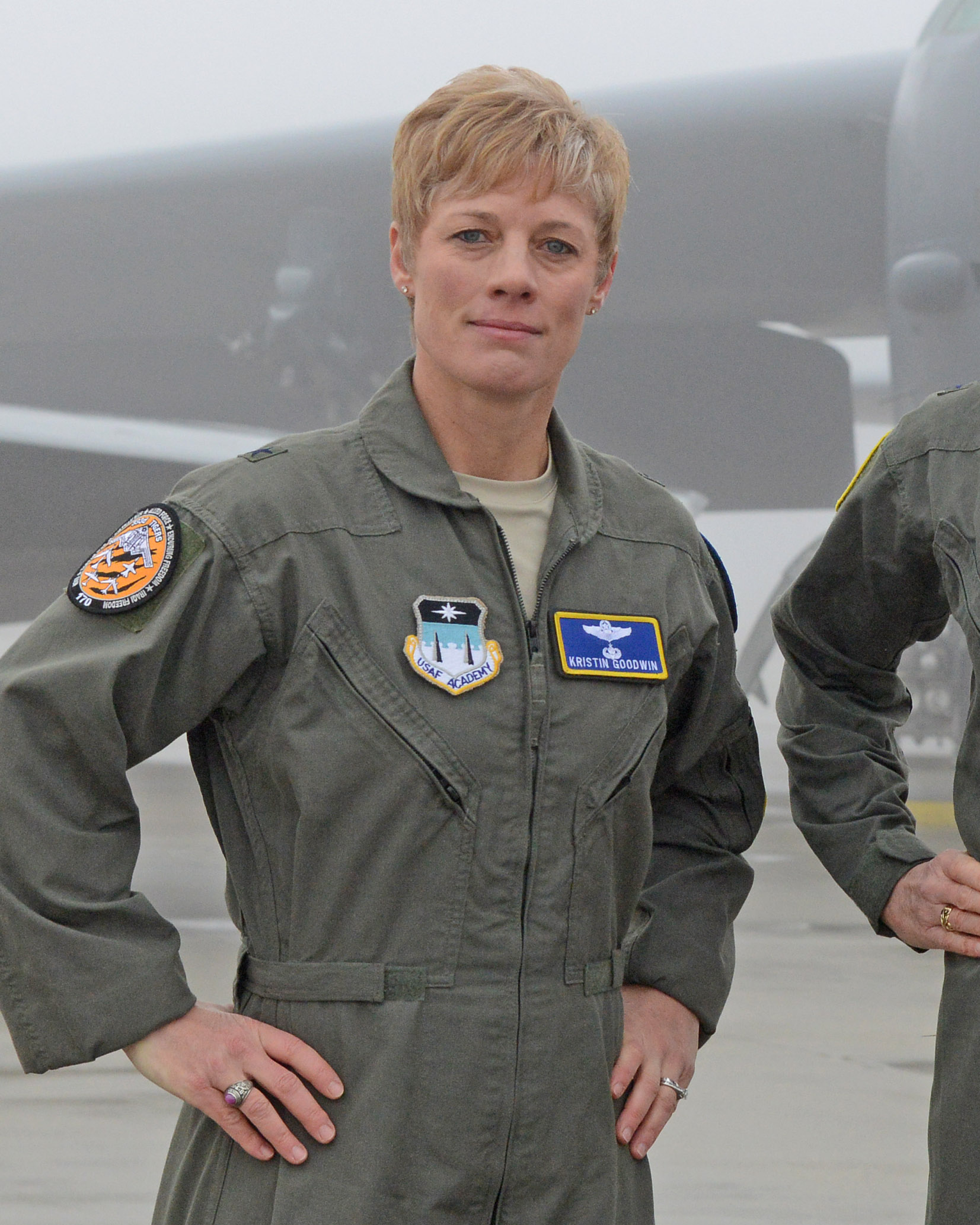
Comdt. Goodwin (February 2019)

The Air Force announced on 21 March 2017 that Colonel Goodwin was to be the next commandant of cadets at the Air Force Academy, concurrently serving as commander of the 34th Training Wing. Her appointment, as the academy's first openly gay general officer, was praised by Michael L. Weinstein of the Military Religious Freedom Foundation for its inclusivity, In contrast, Kayla Moore of the Foundation for Moral Law decried the selection in her letter to United States Secretary of Defense Jim Mattis, claiming that Goodwin "does not set a proper moral example" in accordance with Moore's Christian interpretations of marriage and human sexuality. Goodwin arrived in Colorado in May 2017. She was still serving as commandant on 2 June 2018 when she was promoted to brigadier general.

Commandant Goodwin was credited with instituting new cadet discipline policies, but was reported to have a "stormy relationship with subordinates and colleagues". Anonymous officers at the academy told The Gazette that "Goodwin was a caustic leader who treated those under her roughly and was easily riled."

After the graduation of the academy's 2019 class on 30 May, Goodwin was expected to transfer to the Pentagon, work as director of current operations under Air Force Vice Chief of Staff General Stephen W. Wilson, and be replaced as commandant by Brigadier General Michele C. Edmondson. In April 2019, however, Goodwin was relieved of her command by Lieutenant General Jay B. Silveria citing an unspecified ongoing investigation by the Inspector General of the Department of the Air Force.

On 21 November 2019, the inspector general released its investigative report, substantiating claims that Goodwin blamed others for her failures, failed to engender an acceptable workplace environment, traveled on government time for personal purposes to the tune of US$5,300 (equivalent to $6,795 in 2025), made inappropriate charges to a cadet's government credit card while on temporary duty assignment to the Captain Marvel premiere, and more. In response, Goodwin's civilian attorney announced that the general would pursue redress for Silveria's decision in accordance with Article 138 of the Uniform Code of Military Justice as it was based on hearsay and therefore "[w]e assess his actions were arbitrary, capricious, or an abuse of his discretion as superintendent." Goodwin also maintains that she endured homophobic "bigotry, bias and discrimination".

==== Post-Academy ====
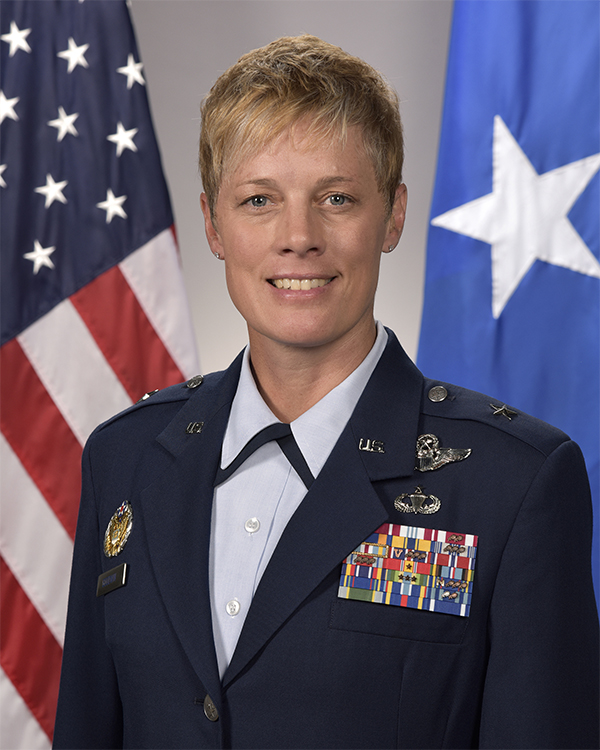
BG Goodwin (2021)

According to Goodwin's official Air Force biography, she was the chief of staff of the Joint Force Space Component Command at Peterson Air Force Base from May to August 2019 before becoming director of the North American Aerospace Defense Command and United States Northern Command Transformation Office at Peterson. After one year, Goodwin remained at Peterson and was posted to Space Operations Command: first as chief of staff from August 2020 to June 2021, and then as Deputy Commanding General for Support.

According to KOAA-TV, Goodwin was retired from the Air Force by April 2024, and volunteering with Honor Flight. That June she was a distinguished guest speaker at the grand opening of Barksdale Global Power Museum's "BAFB Women’s Exhibit".

=== Awards and decorations ===
As of August 2021, Goodwin was a recipient of two Legion of Merits, the Defense Meritorious Service Medal, three Meritorious Service Medals, an Air Medal, an Air Force Commendation Medal, four Air Force Achievement Medals, a Joint Meritorious Unit Award, four Air Force Outstanding Unit Awards (with "V" device), an Air Force Organizational Excellence Award, four Combat Readiness Medals, two National Defense Service Medals, an Armed Forces Expeditionary Medal, the Global War on Terrorism Service Medal, four Nuclear Deterrence Operations Service Medals (with N device), and a NATO Medal.
