= Judge Vance =

Judge Vance may refer to:

- Bob Vance (jurist) (born 1961), judge of Alabama's 10th Judicial Circuit
- Robert Smith Vance (1931–1989), judge of the United States Court of Appeals for the Fifth Circuit
- Sarah S. Vance (born 1950), judge of the United States District Court for the Eastern District of Louisiana
