= Bob Vance (jurist) =

American judge (born 1961)

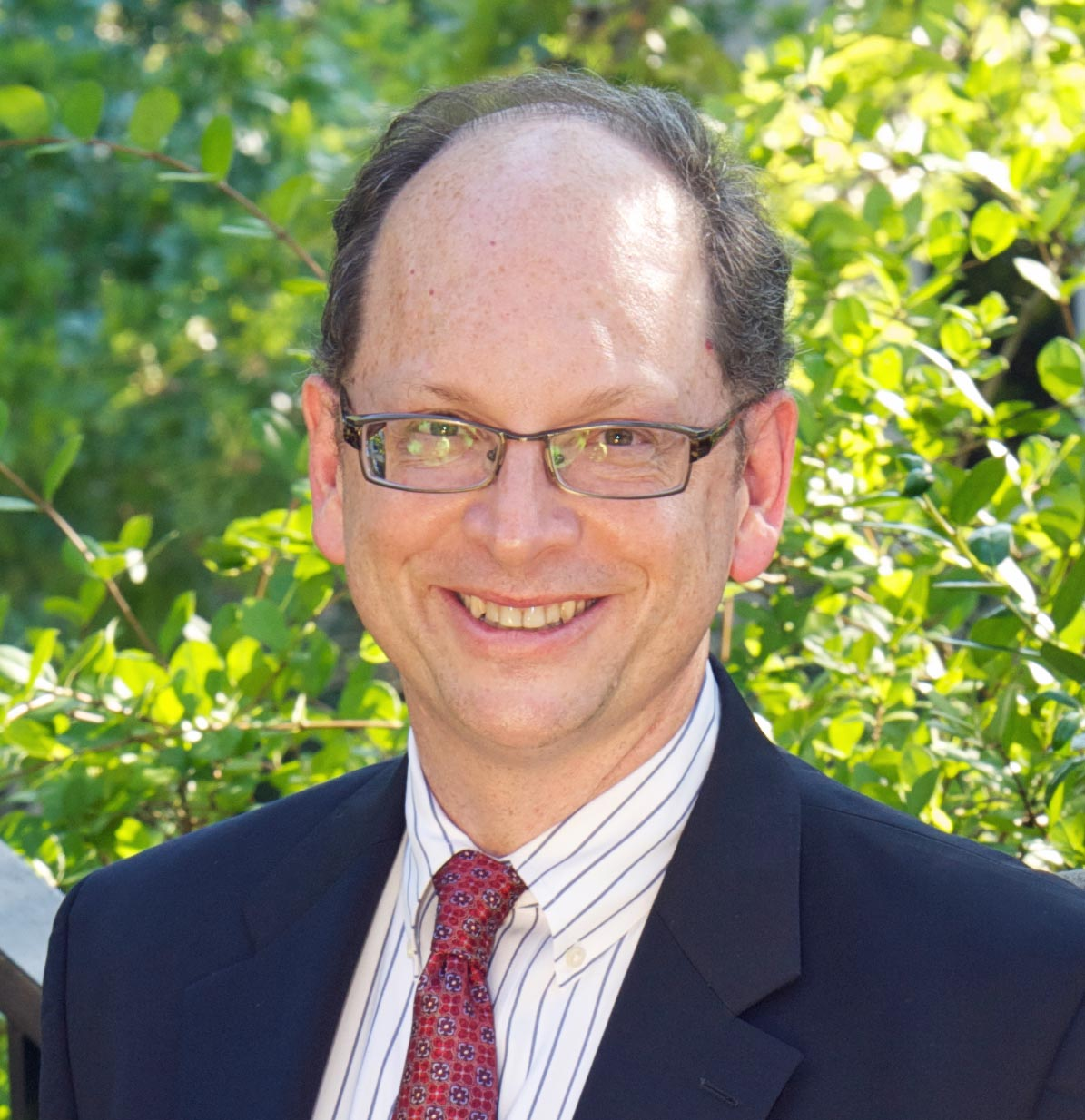

Circuit Judge of Jefferson County, Alabama
- Incumbent
- Assumed office November 4, 2002
- Preceded by: Arthur Hanes Jr.

Personal details
- Born: Robert Smith Vance Jr. April 10, 1961 (age 65) Birmingham, Alabama, U.S.
- Party: Democratic
- Spouse: Joyce White Vance
- Children: 4
- Parent(s): Robert Smith Vance; Helen Hauk Rainey
- Education: Princeton University; University of Virginia

Robert Smith Vance Jr. (born April 10, 1961) is an American lawyer and jurist who is a circuit court judge on Alabama's 10th Judicial Circuit, located in Birmingham, Alabama.

== Early life and education ==
Vance was born on April 10, 1961, in Birmingham, Alabama. He attended Princeton University and the University of Virginia School of Law.

== Career ==
Vance clerked for Judge Thomas Gibbs Gee on the United States Court of Appeals for the Fifth Circuit before starting work at the Birmingham law firm Johnston, Barton, Proctor and Powell as a litigator.

=== Alabama Circuit Court Judge ===
Vance was first appointed to the bench to serve out the term of Judge Art Hanes in 2002 and subsequently elected to a full term. He was reelected in 2010, without opposition.

In 2006, in Gooden v. Worley, a case that challenged the Alabama law that removed the right to vote from those convicted of felonies of moral turpitude, Vance ordered the state of Alabama to allow ex-felons to vote, holding that the law failed to identify the crimes that fit the definition. Vance was reversed on appeal to the Supreme Court of Alabama.

=== Campaign for Chief Justice of the Supreme Court of Alabama ===
Vance ran unsuccessfully for Chief Justice of the Supreme Court of Alabama in 2012. He reluctantly entered the race in August 2012, after the former Democratic candidate Harry Lyon was disqualified from the ballot in large part due to erratic behavior and rants against gays and lesbians. His opponent was former Chief Justice Roy Moore, who had previously been removed from the bench for failing to follow an order from the federal district court to remove a religious monument he had installed in the rotunda of the Heflin-Torbert Judicial Building. At the time Vance entered the race, there were no statewide elected Democrats in the state of Alabama. Despite low expectations, Vance was barely defeated by Roy Moore in the general election on November 6, receiving 48.23% of the vote.

Vance was the nominee for Chief Justice in 2018, but his bid was unsuccessful.

== Personal life ==
Vance is married to law school classmate Joyce Vance, who served as United States Attorney in the United States District Court for the Northern District of Alabama from 2009 to 2017. They have four children.

Bob Vance's father was Judge Robert Smith Vance, who served on the United States Court of Appeals for the Eleventh Circuit. He was assassinated on December 16, 1989, at his home in Mountain Brook, Alabama, when he opened a package containing a mail bomb sent by serial bomber Walter Leroy Moody, Jr. Vance was killed instantly and Bob's mother, Helen, was seriously injured and hospitalized. Special Prosecutor Louis J. Freeh, who later became the director of the FBI, co-directed the prosecution. Moody had mistakenly thought Judge Vance had denied his appeal of another case. The federal government charged Moody with the murders of Judge Vance and of Robert E. Robinson, a black civil-rights attorney in Savannah, Georgia, who had been killed in a separate explosion at his office. Moody was also charged with mailing bombs that were defused at the Eleventh Circuit's headquarters in Atlanta and at the Jacksonville office of the National Association for the Advancement of Colored People (NAACP). In 1991, Moody was sentenced to seven federal life terms, plus 400 years. He was subsequently tried in 1996 for murder by the state and was executed by the state of Alabama in 2018 when he was 83 years old.
