= Robert Smith Vance =

American jurist (1931–1989)

Judge of the United States Court of Appeals for the Eleventh Circuit
- In office October 1, 1981 – December 16, 1989
- Preceded by: Seat established
- Succeeded by: Joel Fredrick Dubina

Judge of the United States Court of Appeals for the Fifth Circuit
- In office December 15, 1977 – October 1, 1981
- Appointed by: Jimmy Carter
- Preceded by: Walter Pettus Gewin
- Succeeded by: Seat abolished

Chair of the Alabama Democratic Party
- In office 1975–1977
- Preceded by: Roy Mayhall
- Succeeded by: George Bailes

Personal details
- Born: May 10, 1931 Talladega, Alabama, U.S.
- Died: December 16, 1989 (aged 58) Mountain Brook, Alabama, U.S.
- Cause of death: Assassination
- Party: Democratic
- Spouse: Helen Hauk Rainey
- Children: Robert Smith Vance Jr.
- Education: University of Alabama (BS, JD); George Washington University (LLM)

Robert Smith Vance (May 10, 1931 – December 16, 1989) was a United States circuit judge of the United States Court of Appeals for the Fifth Circuit. He was later the United States Court of Appeals for the Eleventh Circuit in 1981 until his assassination in 1989.

He was one of three 20th-century United States federal court judges assassinated because of his judicial service.

== Early life, education and law career ==
Born in Talladega, Alabama, Vance was the youngest of four children born to parents Harrell Taylor Vance Sr. and Mae (née Smith) Vance. He grew up in Birmingham, Alabama and graduated from Woodlawn High School. He then received a Bachelor of Science degree from the University of Alabama in 1950, and a Juris Doctor from University of Alabama School of Law in 1952.

While at Alabama, Vance was purportedly the head of a secret yet powerful inter-fraternity organization known as The Machine and was elected as President of the Student Government Association.

After law school, Vance entered military duty as an attorney in the United States Army Judge Advocate General Corps and was stationed at the Pentagon. One of his first assignments was to serve on the team of lawyers defending the Army in hearings against charges brought by Senator Joseph McCarthy.

After his military service, Vance received a Master of Laws from George Washington University Law School in 1955 and served as a law clerk to Alabama Supreme Court Justice James Mayfield. He then served a one-year stint as an attorney for the United States Labor Department before entering private practice in Birmingham from 1956 to 1977.

As a lawyer, Vance quickly sided with the developing civil rights movement, as shown by his participation as an intervening plaintiff in litigation that ultimately resulted in the United States Supreme Court decision in Reynolds v. Sims, which decided that state legislative districts had to be roughly equal in population. Vance also was the first notable Birmingham attorney to reject the unwritten "gentleman's agreement" by which all black members of a jury pool were eliminated from serving as jurors in civil cases.

Vance served as Chairman of the Alabama Democratic Party from 1966 to 1977. His election as Chairman capped a struggle within the Alabama Democratic Party, as a group loyal to the national party wrested control from a states' rights faction loyal to Governor George Wallace. Throughout Vance's tenure as chairman, Wallace was never able to capture the state party organization, despite continual struggles between the two factions.

The most well-known example of this fight came during the 1968 Democratic National Convention in Chicago, as competing slates of delegates vied for credentials to be seated. Vance's group of party loyalists overcame challenges from both Wallace's group and a predominantly black slate headed by Dr. John Cashin of Huntsville, Alabama.

Vance was also a lecturer at the Cumberland School of Law at Samford University from 1967 to 1969. He served for a number of years in the United States Army Reserve, retiring as a lieutenant colonel.

== Federal judicial service ==
On November 4, 1977, Vance was nominated by President Jimmy Carter to a seat on the United States Court of Appeals for the Fifth Circuit being vacated by Judge Walter Pettus Gewin. Vance was confirmed by the United States Senate on December 15, 1977, and received his commission the same day. The jurisdiction of the Fifth Circuit at that time included six Southern states, including Alabama. In 1981, the territory of the Fifth Circuit was divided into two circuits, and on October 1, 1981, Vance was reassigned to the United States Court of Appeals for the Eleventh Circuit, which he served on until his death.

== Death ==
On December 16, 1989, Vance was killed at his home in Mountain Brook, Alabama, when he opened a package containing a mail bomb at age 58. His wife, Helen, was seriously injured.

=== Trial ===
After an intensive investigation, the federal government charged Walter Leroy Moody Jr. with the murders of Judge Vance and Robert E. Robinson, a black civil-rights attorney in Savannah, Georgia who had been killed in a separate explosion at his office. Moody was also charged with mailing bombs that were defused at the Eleventh Circuit's headquarters in Atlanta and at the Jacksonville office of the NAACP.

Moody had been previously convicted in 1972 of possession of a bomb that exploded in his house, injuring his first wife Hazel; he intended to send the bomb to Atlanta car dealer Thomas N. Downing, the man who repossessed Moody's car. He served four years in federal prison at the federal penitentiary in Atlanta. Prosecutors speculated that Moody's motive for killing Judge Vance was revenge against Vance's court, the U.S. Court of Appeals for the Eleventh Circuit, which had refused to expunge that conviction. Vance, however, had not been a member of the panel that considered Moody's earlier case. After John H. Wood Jr. (1979), and Richard J. Daronco (1988), Vance became the third federal judge in the 20th century to be assassinated because of his judicial service.

After an order was entered directing the recusal of all circuit and district judges within the Eleventh Circuit, Moody's trial for murder and related crimes was presided over by Judge Edward Devitt of the District of Minnesota. After a successful prosecution by special prosecutors Louis Freeh and Howard Shapiro, Moody was convicted of all counts.

He was sentenced to seven federal life terms. An Alabama state-court jury later convicted Moody of Judge Vance's murder and Moody was sentenced to death by electric chair in 1997. He entered death row on February 13, 1997, and was executed by lethal injection on April 19, 2018, at the age of 83 years, becoming the oldest inmate executed in the United States in the post-Furman era, surpassing the previous record set by John B. Nixon, who was executed at the age of 77 years.

== Legacy ==
In 1990, Congress passed H.R. 3691 a bill sponsored by Ben Erdreich renaming the federal building and courthouse in Birmingham, Alabama, as the Robert S. Vance Federal Building and United States Courthouse in memory of Vance. Also in tribute to Judge Vance's service, the Atlanta chapter of the Federal Bar Association hosts an annual Robert S. Vance Forum on the Bill of Rights. Vance was inducted into the Alabama Lawyers' Hall of Fame in 2006.

Vance's older son, Robert Vance, Jr., serves as a state circuit court judge in Birmingham, having first been appointed to that position in November 2002, and elected in 2004. He was the Democratic candidate for Chief Justice of Alabama's Supreme Court in the 2012 election, losing to Republican Roy Moore. Vance's daughter-in-law, Joyce White Vance, was the United States Attorney for the Northern District of Alabama from August 27, 2009, until January 20, 2017.

Vance's widow, Helen (born February 7, 1934), died on October 18, 2010 at age 76.

== See also ==
- List of assassinated American politicians
- List of United States federal judges killed in office
- Jonathan Luna

== Sources ==
- Ray Jenkins, Blind Vengeance: The Roy Moody Mail Bomb Murders (University of Georgia Press 1997).
- Mark Winne, Priority Mail
- Frank M. Johnson, Jr., Reflections on the Judicial Career of Robert S. Vance, 42 Ala. L. Rev. 964 (1990).
- United States v. Moody, 977 F.2d 1425 (11th Cir. 1992).

Legal offices
Preceded by Walter Pettus Gewin	Judge of the United States Court of Appeals for the Fifth Circuit; 1977–1981	Seat abolished
New seat	Judge of the United States Court of Appeals for the Eleventh Circuit; 1981–1989	Succeeded by Joel Fredrick Dubina
