= Herbert Titus =

American attorney, writer, and politician (1937–2021)

Herbert W. Titus

Personal details
- Born: October 17, 1937 Baker City, Oregon, U.S.
- Died: June 20, 2021 (aged 83)
- Party: Constitution
- Spouse: Marilyn Titus
- Education: University of Oregon; Harvard University

Herbert William "Herb" Titus (October 17, 1937 – June 20, 2021) was an American attorney, writer, and political candidate. He was the Constitution Party's nominee for Vice President during the 1996 presidential election.

== Early life ==
Titus was born in Baker City, Oregon, on October 17, 1937. He attended Baker public schools, where he graduated as co-valedictorian of the class of 1955. Four years later he graduated from the University of Oregon, where he had served as student body president. Titus graduated cum laude from Harvard Law School in 1962.

== Career ==
Titus held a law degree from Harvard University, graduating cum laude, and a B.S. degree in political science from the University of Oregon, where he graduated Phi Beta Kappa. He was vice president of the freshman class at Oregon.

He was an active member of the Virginia Bar Association and was admitted to practice before the United States Supreme Court, the United States District Court for the Eastern District of Virginia, the United States Court of Federal Claims, and the United States Courts of Appeals for the Fifth, Sixth, Seventh, Eighth, Ninth, Tenth, and District of Columbia and Federal Circuits. He was also admitted to practice in the Army Court of Criminal Appeals and the Court of Appeals for the Armed Forces.

After two years as a trial attorney and a Special Assistant United States Attorney with the U.S. Department of Justice, Titus worked as a professor of law from 1964 to 1979 at the state universities of Oklahoma, Colorado and Oregon. He was "active in various left-wing-based political causes" during this period, opposing the Vietnam War and supporting homosexual rights and abortion rights. He also worked with attorneys and clients on a number of constitutional cases in his role as a regional director with the American Civil Liberties Union.

In 1975, Titus was "dramatically converted to Christ" while attending a Sunday School class with his wife, after which he studied with Dr. Francis Schaeffer in Switzerland for a year.

He left his tenured position as professor of law at the University of Oregon in 1979 to become a member of the charter faculty at the O. W. Coburn School of Law at Oral Roberts University. Three years later, Titus moved to CBN University (later named Regent University), where he served for a total of eleven years, first as the founding Dean of the School of Public Policy and then as Vice-President for Academic Affairs. Starting in 1986, Titus became the founding Dean of the College of Law and Government in Regent University. All told, Titus taught constitutional law, common law, and other subjects at five different law schools for almost 30 years.

He was the author of a book entitled God, Man and Law: The Biblical Principles.

Titus was of counsel at the Virginia law firm of William J. Olson, P.C., specializing in Constitutional Law, Legislative Practice, Appellate Practice, Election and Campaign Finance, and Firearms Law.

== Politics ==
Titus was the 1996 vice presidential nominee for the Constitution Party (then known as the U.S. Taxpayer's Party) as the running mate of the party founder Howard Phillips.

Along with his client, former Alabama Chief Justice Roy Moore, Titus was an original drafter of the Constitution Restoration Act, which sought to take out of federal court jurisdiction appellate cases that involved public officials who acknowledged God as the sovereign source of law, liberty, or government, and provided for the impeachment of federal judges who disregarded the act. The act did not pass either time it was introduced, but its tenets were incorporated into the 2004 Republican Party platform.

== Personal life ==
Residents of Chesapeake, Virginia, Titus and his wife, Marilyn, to whom he had been married 52 years at the time of his death, had four children and 15 grandchildren.

Titus died on June 20, 2021, a practicing lawyer until his death.

== Writings ==
- Judicial Tyranny: The New Kings of America? - contributing author (Amerisearch, 2005) ISBN 0-9753455-6-7
- God, Man and Law: The Biblical Principles (Institute In Basic Life Principles, 1994) ISBN 0-916888-17-7

Party political offices
Preceded by Albion Knight, Jr.	Constitution Party nominee for Vice President of the United States; 1996	Succeeded by Joseph Sobran; Curtis Frazier¹
Notes and references
1. Joseph Sobran was the original vice presidential nominee in 2000. He withdrew from the race and was replaced by Curtis Frazier.
