= Kayla Moore =

American political activist

- Born: Kayla Danette Kisor; April 26, 1961 (age 65); Etowah County, Alabama, U.S.
- Education: Southside High School
- Alma mater: Jacksonville State University; University of Alabama
- Known for: President of the Foundation for Moral Law
- Spouses: John Charles Heald (1982–1985); Roy Moore (m. 1985)
- Children: 4

Kayla Moore (née Kisor; born April 26, 1961) is an American political activist. She is the president of the Foundation for Moral Law, a socially conservative legal advocacy group. She is married to Roy Moore and campaigned for him in the 2017 Senate special election in Alabama.

== Early life and marriages ==
Kayla Danette Kisor was born on April 26, 1961, in Etowah County, Alabama, to Mack A. Kisor and Dell McDonald Kisor. She attended Southside High School with Beverly Young in Gadsden. As a teenager, she competed in beauty pageants, including Miss Alabama US Teen, Miss Alabama USA and Miss Alabama World. She placed second runner up in the Miss Alabama US Teen contest.

According to her website, Moore attended Jacksonville State University and the University of Alabama.

Moore married John Charles Heald on June 5, 1982. Together they had a daughter, Heather, who is a board member for the Foundation for Moral Law. Moore filed for divorce on December 28, 1984, citing "cruel treatment during the marriage", and it was granted April 19, 1985. On January 9, 1989, Moore obtained full custody of her daughter Heather, who Roy eventually adopted.

In 1984, Kayla met Roy Moore. Kayla told Breitbart she met Roy at a Bible study, while Roy stated in his memoir the two met at a church Christmas party. Roy's memoir noted he had first seen Kayla "many" years earlier at a dance recital held at Gadsden State Junior College. He also remembered her first and last names started with "K", but the specific number of years was not given in the memoir. Al.com columnist Kyle Whitmire publicized a July 2017 interview with Roy. In the interview, Roy relates the story of how he had first seen her at the dance recital, then stated "It was, oh gosh, eight years later, or something, I met her", referring to their meeting at the 1984 church party. In his memoir, Roy noted he was so "anxious to meet [Kayla]" in 1984, he approached her with the line "Haven't we met somewhere before?", implying he had first noticed her when she was fifteen or sixteen years old.

The two married in December 1985 and eventually had sons Caleb, Micah and Ory.

In 1999, Moore was hit by a car in the Colonial Mall-Gadsden parking lot. After filing an auto accident suit, she was awarded more than $270,000.

== Politics ==
In 2015 Moore ran for secretary of the Alabama Republican Party to replace Sallie Bryant, who was retiring after 14 years in the position. Bryant endorsed Lynn Robinson for the position, to whom Moore ended up losing.

In February 2016, Moore wrote an op-ed for The Birmingham News endorsing Senator Ted Cruz for the US presidency. Moore called Cruz a "true defender of the Constitution" and a "Constitutionalist and a faithful defender of life, marriage, and small government." Cruz stated he was honored to have Moore's support in the race.

When Moore's husband Roy was running in the 2017 Senate special election in Alabama, multiple women publicly stated that Roy had sexually harassed or assaulted them. Moore led a vehement defense of her husband, speaking at a rally outside the Alabama State Capitol in November and posting many articles and comments on her Facebook page to discredit her husband's accusers. At that rally, Moore criticized her husband's opponent, Doug Jones, by asking, "Who was an Obama delegate? Who is for full-term abortion? Who is for more gun restrictions? Who is for transgender bathrooms? Who is for transgender in the military?" Moore also defended her husband against charges of bigotry by stating "One of our attorneys is a Jew. We have very close friends that are Jewish and rabbis, and we also fellowship with them."

== Foundation for Moral Law ==
The Foundation for Moral Law was created in 2003 by Roy, with Kayla Moore taking over for Roy as president in January 2013. Over three years as the foundation's president, Moore earned $195,000. As president of the foundation, Slate's Molly Olmstead called Moore "somewhat [of a] public figure in Alabama because of her role."

In November 2015, Moore shared a video calling then-president Barack Obama a Muslim. The video, titled "Obama the Muslim, His Own Words", was originally shared by Britain First, a far-right British nationalist organization. The video was shared on the Foundation's page and her personal Facebook page.

In April 2017, Moore issued a statement from the Foundation that publicly opposed the appointment of a commandant for the U.S. Air Force Academy because she is a lesbian. Moore criticized Col. Kristin Goodwin in a letter to Jim Mattis, stating, "I oppose this nomination because Col. Goodwin does not set a proper moral example for youth. The person responsible for the education of cadets at the academy is a role model and an exemplar of proper deportment and conduct."

In October 2017, Moore sent a letter to Alabama's Trussville City Schools, where she stated the Freedom from Religion Foundation and others are trying to "drive prayer out of school athletic events." She stated "they often fail to follow through with legal action if local officials refuse to cave in to their demands", and that the Trussville City Schools should ignore the FFRF altogether.

== Personal life ==
Moore identifies as a Southern Baptist. She and her husband attend Gallant First Baptist Church in Alabama.

As of 2017, Moore has five grandchildren.
