= Constitution Restoration Act =

Proposed US federal law

The Constitution Restoration Act of 2005 (originally "of 2004" H.R. 3799) is a proposed federal law filed on March 3, 2005, by United States Senator Richard Shelby (R-AL) and Representative Robert Aderholt (R-AL). It was styled as Senate bill S. 520 and House of Representatives bill H.R. 1070. It was originally drafted by Roy Moore and his attorney Herb Titus, former vice-presidential candidate of the Constitution Party, in 1996.

The central statement of the bill is that, after passing, "the Supreme Court shall not have jurisdiction to review, by appeal, writ of certiorari, or otherwise, any matter to the extent that relief is sought against an entity of Federal, State, or local government, or against an officer or agent of Federal, State, or local government (whether or not acting in official or personal capacity), concerning that entity's, officer's, or agent's acknowledgment of God as the sovereign source of law, liberty, or government." In other words, the bill would limit the power of the federal judiciary specifically in religious liberty cases. The bill also states that judges or other court officials that listen to cases that meet said criteria are to be impeached and convicted.

Supporters of the bills, largely conservative Republicans, claim that the legislation re-asserts the original meaning of the First Amendment and the principle of limited government power over rights of conscience and religion. Opponents of the bill have expressed concern that the bill would repeal the applicability of the First Amendment to state and local governments by rendering it impossible to appeal constitutionally questionable state decisions beyond the state level. The act has been viewed by critics as an attempt to advance the cause of Dominionism by conservative evangelical Christian Republicans.

The bills were originally introduced in 2004 in both the U.S. House and the U.S. Senate, but languished in committee. Reintroduced at the beginning of the 2005 congressional session, they were read twice and referred to the Committee on the Judiciary, where they again languished. The Republican Study Committee, a caucus of conservative House members of the Republican Party, allegedly promoted the passage of "protections for religious freedom" as item #10 on their list of top ten legislative priorities of 2006. In early 2006 the proposal was endorsed by panels of both houses of the Idaho Legislature.
