= Roy Moore =

American politician and jurist (born 1947)

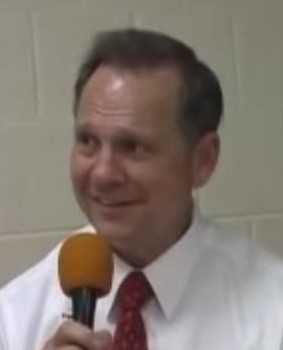
- Moore in 2011

27th & 31st Chief Justice of the Supreme Court of Alabama
- In office January 15, 2013 – April 26, 2017; Suspended: May 6, 2016 – April 26, 2017
- Preceded by: Chuck Malone
- Succeeded by: Lyn Stuart
- In office January 15, 2001 – November 13, 2003
- Preceded by: Perry O. Hooper Sr.
- Succeeded by: Gorman Houston (acting)

Circuit Judge for the Sixteenth Circuit Court of Alabama
- In office November 6, 1992 – November 7, 2000
- Appointed by: H. Guy Hunt
- Preceded by: Julius Swann
- Succeeded by: William Millican

Personal details
- Born: Roy Stewart Moore; February 11, 1947 (age 79) Gadsden, Alabama, U.S.
- Party: Republican (1992–present)
- Other political affiliations: Democratic (before 1992)
- Spouse: Kayla Kisor (m. 1985)
- Children: 4
- Education: United States Military Academy (BS); University of Alabama (JD)
- Website: Official website

Military service
- Allegiance: United States
- Branch/service: United States Army
- Years of service: 1969–1974
- Rank: Captain
- Unit: 504th Military Police Battalion
- Battles/wars: Vietnam War

Roy Stewart Moore (born February 11, 1947) is an American politician, lawyer, and jurist who served as chief justice of the Supreme Court of Alabama from 2001 to 2003 and again from 2013 to 2017, each time being removed from office for judicial misconduct by the Alabama Court of the Judiciary. He was the Republican Party nominee in the 2017 U.S. Senate special election in Alabama to fill the seat vacated by Jeff Sessions, but was accused by several women of sexually assaulting them while they were underage and lost to Democratic candidate Doug Jones. Moore ran for the same Senate seat again in 2020 and lost the Republican primary.

Moore attended West Point and served as a company commander in the Military Police Corps during the Vietnam War. After graduating from the University of Alabama Law School, he joined the Etowah County district attorney's office, serving as an assistant district attorney from 1977 to 1982. In 1992, he was appointed as a circuit judge by Governor Guy Hunt to fill a vacancy, and was elected to the position for the next term. In 2001, Moore was elected to the position of chief justice of the Supreme Court of Alabama. Moore was removed from his position in November 2003 by the Alabama Court of the Judiciary for refusing a federal court's order to remove a marble monument of the Ten Commandments that he had placed in the rotunda of the Alabama Judicial Building.

Moore sought the Republican nomination for the governorship of Alabama in 2006 and 2010, but lost in the primaries. Moore was elected again as chief justice in 2012, but he was suspended in May 2016, for defying a U.S. Supreme Court decision about same-sex marriage (Obergefell v. Hodges), and resigned in April 2017. On September 26, 2017, he won a primary runoff to become the Republican candidate in a special election for a U.S. Senate seat that had been vacated by Jeff Sessions.

In November 2017, during his special election campaign for U.S. Senate, several public allegations of sexual misconduct were made against Moore. Three women stated that he had sexually assaulted them when they were at the respective ages of 14, 16 and 28; six other women reported that Moore – then in his 30s – pursued sexual relationships with them while they were as young as 16. Moore acknowledged that he may have approached and dated teenagers while he was in his 30s, but denied sexually assaulting anyone. President Donald Trump endorsed Moore a week before the election, after which some Republicans withdrew their opposition to Moore. Democrat Doug Jones won the election, becoming the first Democrat since 1992 to win a U.S. Senate seat in Alabama.

Moore's political views have been characterized as far-right and Christian nationalist. He has attracted national media attention and controversy over his views on race, homosexuality, transgender people, and Islam, his belief that Christianity should dictate public policy, and his past ties to neo-Confederate and white-nationalist groups. Moore was a leading voice in the "birther" movement, which promoted the false claim that president Barack Obama was not born in the United States. He founded the Foundation for Moral Law, a non-profit legal organization from which he collected more than $1 million over five years. On its tax filings, the organization indicated a much lesser amount of pay to Moore.

== Early life ==
=== Education and military service ===
Moore was born in Gadsden, Alabama, the seat of Etowah County, to construction worker Roy Baxter Moore, who died in 1967, and Evelyn Stewart. He is the oldest of five children, and grew up with two brothers and two sisters. In 1954, the family relocated to Houston, Texas, the site of a postwar building boom. After about four years, they returned to Alabama, then moved to Pennsylvania, and then returned permanently to Alabama. His father worked for the Tennessee Valley Authority, first building dams and later the Anniston Army Depot. Moore attended his freshman year of high school at Gallant near Gadsden, and transferred to Etowah County High School for his final three years, graduating in 1965.

Moore was admitted to the United States Military Academy at West Point, New York, on the recommendation of outgoing Democratic U.S. representative Albert Rains, and after confirmation of that nomination by incoming Republican representative James D. Martin of Gadsden. He graduated in 1969 with a Bachelor of Science degree. With the Vietnam War underway, Moore served in several posts as a military police officer, including Fort Benning, Georgia, and Illesheim, West Germany, before being deployed to South Vietnam. Serving as the commander of 188th Military Police Company of the 504th Military Police Battalion, Moore was perceived to be reckless, but very strict. He insisted that his troops salute him on the battlefield, despite official training which discourages such behavior because salutes can identify an officer to enemy targeting. Some of his soldiers gave him the derogatory nickname "Captain America", due to his attitude toward discipline. This role earned him enemies, and in his autobiography he recalls sleeping on sandbags to avoid a grenade or bomb being tossed under his cot, as many of his men had threatened him with fragging.

Moore was discharged from the United States Army as a captain in 1974, and was admitted to the University of Alabama School of Law that same year. A professor and fellow students held him in low regard due to his incapacity for keen analysis. He graduated in 1977 with a Juris Doctor degree and returned to Gadsden.

=== Elections and travels ===
Moore soon moved to the district attorney's office, working as the first full-time prosecutor in Etowah County. During his tenure there, Moore was investigated by the state bar for "suspect conduct" after convening a grand jury to examine what he perceived to have been funding shortages in the sheriff's office. Several weeks after the state bar investigation was dismissed as unfounded, Moore quit his prosecuting position to run as a Democrat for the county's circuit-court judge seat in 1982. The election was bitter, with Moore alleging that cases were being delayed in exchange for payoffs. The allegations were never substantiated. Moore overwhelmingly lost the Democratic runoff primary to fellow attorney Donald Stewart, whom Moore described as "an honorable man for whom I have much respect, (who) eventually became a close friend". A second bar complaint against Moore followed, which was dismissed as unfounded. Moore left Gadsden shortly thereafter to live for a year in Australia.

In Australia, a country Moore said later he had wanted to visit after his service in Vietnam but was unable to at the time, he went to Queensland. From the state capital, Brisbane, he first went to Ayr and helped with the sugar cane harvest, then inland to what is now the Central Highlands Region, where he fulfilled his longtime desire to see the Outback, eventually working at the Telemon ranch near Springsure, a town where many residents are devout Christians. One of them, the Rolfe family, ran Telemon, and spoke highly of Moore to The Guardian in 2017, "I don't think he'd ever done that sort of manual labor in his life," said Isla Turner, daughter of Colin Rolfe, who had taken Moore in, "but he took to it like a duck to water".

Moore married Kayla Kisor in December 1985. In 1986, he ran for Etowah County's district attorney position against fellow Democrat Jimmy Hedgspeth, but was defeated. In 1992, Moore switched his affiliation to the Republican Party.

== Judicial career ==
=== Circuit Judge (1992–2000) ===
==== Appointment ====
In 1992, Etowah County circuit judge Julius Swann died in office. Republican governor H. Guy Hunt was charged with making an appointment until the next election. Moore's name was floated by some of his associates, and a background check was initiated with several state and county agencies, including the Etowah County district attorney's office. Moore's former political opponent Jimmy Hedgspeth, who still helmed the D.A.'s office, recommended Moore despite personal reservations, and Moore was installed in the position he had failed to win in 1982. Moore ran as a Republican in the 1994 Etowah County election and was elected to the circuit judge seat (six year term) with 62% of the vote. He was the first county-wide Republican to win since Reconstruction.

==== Early prayer/Ten Commandments controversy ====
During Moore's tenure as circuit judge, he hung a homemade wooden Ten Commandments plaque on the wall of his courtroom behind his bench. Moore told the Montgomery Advertiser that his intention in hanging the plaque was to fill up the bare space on the courtroom walls and to indicate the importance of the Ten Commandments. He stated that it was not his intention to generate controversy. He told The Atlantic that he understood the potential for controversy existed, but "I wanted to establish the moral foundation of our law."

While Moore presided over a murder case shortly after his appointment, the defendant's attorney objected to the plaque. This attracted the attention of critics who also objected to Moore's practice of opening court sessions with a prayer beseeching divine guidance for jurors in their deliberations. In at least one case, Moore asked a clergyman to lead the court's jury pool in prayer. The local branch of the American Civil Liberties Union (ACLU) sent a letter in June 1993 threatening a lawsuit if such prayers did not cease.

On June 20, 1994, the ACLU sent a representative to Moore's courtroom to observe and record the pre-session prayer. Although the organization did not immediately file suit, Moore decried the action as an "act of intimidation" in a post-trial press conference. The incident drew additional attention to Moore while he was campaigning to hold onto his circuit court seat. In that year's election, Moore won the seat in a landslide victory over attorney Keith Pitts, who had unsuccessfully prosecuted the "Silk and Satin" murder case.

==== Lawsuit ====
In March 1995, the ACLU filed a lawsuit against Moore, stating that the pre-court session prayers and the Ten Commandments display were both unconstitutional. This original lawsuit was eventually dismissed for technical reasons, but Governor Fob James instructed state attorney general Bill Pryor to file suit in Montgomery County in support of Moore. The case was tried before state circuit judge Charles Price, who in 1996 declared the prayers unconstitutional but initially allowed the Ten Commandments plaque to remain on the courtroom walls.

Immediately after the ruling, Moore held a press conference vowing to defy the ruling against pre-session prayers and affirming a religious intent in displaying the plaque. Critics responded by asking Price to reconsider his previous ruling, and the judge issued a new ruling requiring the Ten Commandments plaque to be removed in ten days. Moore appealed Price's decision and kept the plaque up; ten days later the Supreme Court of Alabama issued a temporary stay against the ruling. The Court never ruled in the case, throwing it out for technical reasons in 1998.

=== Chief Justice, Alabama Supreme Court (2001–2003 and 2012–2017) ===
==== Campaign and election ====
In late 1999, the American Family Association began working to draft Moore into the race for chief justice of the Alabama Supreme Court, when incumbent Republican Perry O. Hooper, Sr., of Montgomery announced that he would not seek reelection. Moore said that he was hesitant to make the statewide race because he had "absolutely no funds" and three other candidates, particularly Associate Justice Harold See, were well-financed.

Nevertheless, on December 7, 1999, Moore announced from his Etowah County courtroom that he would enter the race with the hope of returning "God to our public life and restore the moral foundation of our law". His campaign, centered on religious issues, arguing that Christianity's declining influence "corresponded directly with school violence, homosexuality, and crime".

He was the heavy favorite to win the Republican nomination because of his support from the state business community and the party hierarchy, including Chief Justice Hooper. However, as Moore made headway in state polls, See elicited the help of Republican strategist Karl Rove, advisor to Texas governor and future president George W. Bush. Despite Rove's support and significantly more campaign funding, See lost the primary to Moore. Moore also beat two other opponents, criminal appeals judge Pam Baschab, and Jefferson County presiding circuit judge Wayne Thorn, in the Republican Primary – without a runoff – garnering over 50% of the statewide primary vote. Moore then easily defeated Democratic contender Sharon Yates in November's general election with over 60% of the vote.

Moore was sworn in as chief justice on January 15, 2001. Former U.S. representative James D. Martin, who had appointed Moore to West Point years earlier, was among the dignitaries in attendance. On taking the position, Moore said that he had "come to realize the real meaning of the First Amendment and its relationship to the God on whom the oath was based. My mind had been opened to the spiritual war occurring in our state and our nation that was slowly removing the knowledge of that relationship between God and law."

I pledged to support not only the U.S. Constitution, but the Alabama Constitution as well, which provided in its preamble that the state 'established justice' by 'invoking the favor and guidance of Almighty God.' The connection between God and our law could not be more clear ...

=== Ten Commandments monument controversy ===
==== Construction and installation ====
A month after his election, Moore began making plans for a large monument to the Ten Commandments, believing that the Heflin-Torbert Judicial Building required something grander than a wooden plaque. His final design involved a 5,280-pound (2,390 kg) granite block, three feet (0.91 m) wide by three feet deep by four feet (1.2 m) tall, covered with quotes from the Declaration of Independence, the national anthem, and several founding fathers. The crowning element would be two large carved tablets inscribed with the Ten Commandments. High-grade granite from Vermont was ordered and shipped, and Moore found benefactors and a sculptor to complete the job. Moore's actions were made without the consent or knowledge of the eight associate justices.

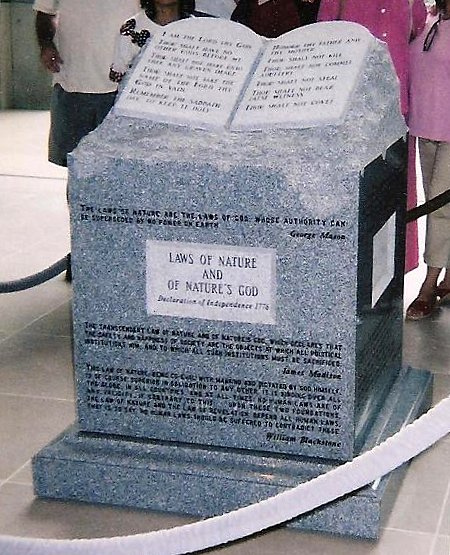
The Ten Commandments monument in the rotunda of the Heflin-Torbert Judicial Building, erected in 2001

On the evening of July 31, 2001, Moore had the completed monument transported to the building and installed in the rotunda. Videotapes of this event were sold by Coral Ridge Ministries, an evangelical media outlet in Fort Lauderdale, Florida, which later used proceeds from the sales of the tapes to underwrite Moore's ensuing legal expenses.

The next morning, Moore held a press conference in the rotunda to publicly unveil the monument. In a speech following the unveiling, Moore declared, "Today a cry has gone out across our land for the acknowledgment of that God upon whom this nation and our laws were founded ... May this day mark the restoration of the moral foundation of law to our people and the return to the knowledge of God in our land."

==== Federal lawsuit ====
On October 30, 2001, the ACLU of Alabama, Americans United for Separation of Church and State and the Southern Poverty Law Center were among groups that filed suit in the United States District Court for the Middle District of Alabama, asking that the monument be removed because it "sends a message to all who enter the Heflin-Torbert Judicial Building that the government encourages and endorses the practice of religion in general and Judeo-Christianity in particular".

The trial, titled Glassroth v. Moore, began on October 15, 2002. Evidence for the plaintiffs included testimony that lawyers of different religious beliefs had changed their work practices, including routinely avoiding visiting the court building to avoid passing by the monument, and testimony that the monument created a religious atmosphere, with many people using the area for prayer.

Moore argued that he would not remove the monument, as doing so would violate his oath of office:

[The monument] serves to remind the Appellate Courts and judges of the Circuit and District Court of this State and members of the bar who appear before them, as well as the people of Alabama who visit the [Heflin-Torbet Judicial Building], of the truth stated in the Preamble to the Alabama Constitution that in order to establish justice we must invoke 'the favor and guidance of almighty God'.

On this note, Moore said that the Ten Commandments are the "moral foundation" of U.S. law, stating that in order to restore this foundation, "we must first recognize the source from which all morality springs ... [by] recogniz[ing] the sovereignty of God." He added that the addition of the monument to the state judiciary building marked "the beginning of the restoration of the moral foundation of law to our people" and "a return to the knowledge of God in our land".

Additionally, Moore acknowledged an explicit theistic intent in placing the monument, agreeing that the monument "reflects the sovereignty of God over the affairs of men" and "acknowledge[s] God's overruling power over the affairs of men". However, in Moore's view this did not violate the doctrine of separation of church and state; as the presiding judge later summarized it, Moore argued "the Judeo-Christian God reigned over both the church and the state in this country, and that both owed allegiance to that God," although they must keep their affairs separate.

==== Judgment and appeal ====
On November 18, 2002, federal U.S. district judge Myron Herbert Thompson issued his ruling declaring that the monument violated the Establishment Clause of the First Amendment to the United States Constitution and was thus unconstitutional:

If all Chief Justice Moore had done were to emphasize the Ten Commandments' historical and educational importance ... or their importance as a model code for good citizenship ... this court would have a much different case before it. But the Chief Justice did not limit himself to this; he went far, far beyond. He installed a two-and-a-half ton monument in the most prominent place in a government building, managed with dollars from all state taxpayers, with the specific purpose and effect of establishing a permanent recognition of the 'sovereignty of God,' the Judeo-Christian God, over all citizens in this country, regardless of each taxpaying citizen's individual personal beliefs or lack thereof. To this, the Establishment Clause says no.

Judge Thompson's decision mandated that Moore remove the monument from the state judicial building by January 3, 2003, but stayed this order on December 23, 2002, after Moore appealed the decision to the United States Court of Appeals for the Eleventh Circuit. This appeal was argued on June 4, 2003, before a three-judge panel in Atlanta, Georgia. On July 1, 2003, the panel issued a ruling upholding the lower court's decision, agreeing that "the monument fails two of Lemon's three prongs. It violates the Establishment Clause." Additionally, the court noted that different religious traditions assign different wordings of the Ten Commandments, meaning that "choosing which version of the Ten Commandments to display can have religious endorsement implications".

In response to the appeals court's decision, Judge Thompson lifted his stay on August 5, 2003, requiring Moore to have the monument removed from public areas of the state judicial building by August 20.

==== Protests and monument removal ====
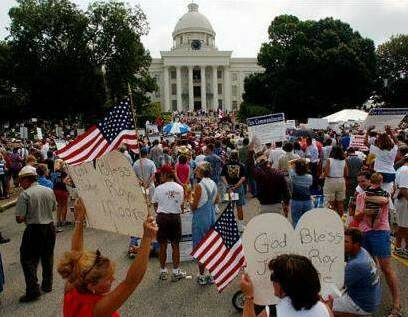
Rally before the Alabama State Capitol, August 16, 2003

On August 14, Moore announced his intention to defy Judge Thompson's order to have the monument removed. Two days later, large rallies in support of Moore and the Ten Commandments monument formed in front of the judicial building, featuring speakers such as Alan Keyes, the Reverend Jerry Falwell, and Moore himself. The crowd peaked at an estimated count of 4,000 that day, and anywhere from several hundred to over a thousand protesters remained through the end of August.

The time limit for removal expired on August 20, with the monument still in place in the building's rotunda. As specified in Judge Thompson's order, the state of Alabama faced fines of $5,000 a day until the monument was removed. In response, the eight other members of the Alabama Supreme Court intervened on August 21, unanimously overruled Moore, and ordered the removal of the monument.

Moore said that Thompson, "fearing that I would not obey his order, decided to threaten other state officials and force them to remove the monument if I did not do so. A threat of heavy fines was his way of coercing obedience to that order," an action that Moore saw as a violation of the Eleventh Amendment to the United States Constitution.

On August 27, the monument was moved to a non-public side room in the judicial building. The monument was not immediately removed from the building for several reasons – pending legal hearings, the monument's weight, worries that the monument could break through the floor if it was taken outside intact, and a desire to avoid confrontation with protesters massed outside the structure. The monument was not actually removed from the state judicial building until July 19, 2004.

==== Removal from office ====
On August 22, 2003, two days after the deadline for the Ten Commandments monument's removal had passed, the Alabama Judicial Inquiry Commission (JIC) filed a complaint with the Alabama Court of the Judiciary (COJ), a panel of judges, lawyers and others appointed variously by judges, legal leaders, the governor and the lieutenant governor. The complaint effectively suspended Moore from the chief justice position pending a hearing by the COJ.

The COJ ethics hearing was held on November 12, 2003. Moore repeated his earlier sentiment that "to acknowledge God cannot be a violation of the Canons of Ethics. Without God there can be no ethics." He also acknowledged that he would repeat his defiance of the court order if given another opportunity to do so, and that if he returned to office, "I certainly wouldn't leave [the monument] in a closet, shrouded from the public." In closing arguments, the assistant attorney general said Moore's defiance, left unchecked, "undercuts the entire workings of the judicial system ... What message does that send to the public, to other litigants? The message it sends is: If you don't like a court order, you don't have to follow it."

The next day, the COJ issued a unanimous opinion ruling that "Chief Justice Moore has violated the Alabama Canons of Judicial Ethics as alleged by the JIC in its complaint." The COJ had several disciplinary options, including censure or suspension without pay, but because Moore's responses had indicated he would defy any similar court orders in the future, the COJ concluded that "under these circumstances, there is no penalty short of removal from office that would resolve this issue."

Moore appealed the COJ's ruling to the Supreme Court of Alabama on December 10, 2003. A special panel of retired judges and justices was randomly selected to hear the case. Moore argued that the COJ did not consider the underlying legality of the federal courts' order that the monument be removed from the courthouse. The Alabama Supreme Court rejected this argument, saying that the COJ did not have the authority to overrule the federal courts, only to determine whether Moore violated the Canons of Judicial Ethics. Therefore, the Court reasoned, it was enough to show that a procedurally-valid order was in place against Moore. Moore also argued that the COJ had imposed a religious test on him to hold his office, and that the COJ's actions had violated his own rights under the Free Exercise Clause of the First Amendment.

The Supreme Court of Alabama rejected each of these arguments as well, and ruled on April 30, 2004, that the COJ had acted properly. The court also upheld the sanction of removal as appropriate.

=== Return to the bench ===
Moore sought to return to the bench, and in the March 2012 Republican primary for chief justice of Alabama, Moore won the Republican nomination, defeating the sitting Chief Justice Chuck Malone (who had been appointed by Governor Bentley the previous year) and Mobile County circuit judge Charles Graddick.

In the November 2012 general election, Moore defeated the Democratic nominee, Jefferson County circuit judge Bob Vance, and returned to the bench. Moore received 913,021 votes, to Vance's 850,816 votes.

=== Views on same-sex marriage ===
On January 28, 2015, the Southern Poverty Law Center filed a judicial ethics complaint against Moore, stating that he had publicly commented on pending same-sex marriage cases and encouraged state officials and judges to ignore federal court rulings overturning bans on same-sex marriage.

Moore issued an order to probate judges and their employees on February 8, the day before a federal court ruling legalizing same-sex marriage in Alabama was set to take effect, ordering them to disregard the ruling and enforce the state's ban under threat of legal action by the governor. On February 9, after the United States Supreme Court allowed the federal court ruling to take effect, probate judges in Birmingham, Montgomery, and Huntsville disobeyed Moore and issued marriage licenses to same-sex couples.

On January 6, 2016, after the U.S. Supreme Court issued its opinion in Obergefell v. Hodges the previous June, Moore issued an administrative order to lower court judges stating, "until further decision by the Alabama Supreme Court, the existing orders of the Alabama Supreme Court that Alabama probate judges have a ministerial duty not to issue any marriage license contrary to the Alabama Sanctity of Marriage Amendment or the Alabama Marriage Protection Act remain in full force and effect."

=== 2016 suspension from the bench and resignation ===
On May 6, 2016, the Alabama Judicial Inquiry Commission (JIC) forwarded a list of six charges of ethical violations by Moore to the Alabama Court of the Judiciary. Moore was suspended from the Alabama Supreme Court pending trial and ruling. Moore faced removal from office over the charges, which were more serious than those which removed him from office in 2003. The JIC's complaint charged Moore with violating the Alabama Canon of Judicial Ethics by:

1. disregarding a federal injunction.
2. demonstrated unwillingness to follow clear law.
3. abuse of administrative authority.
4. substituting his judgment for the judgment of the entire Alabama Supreme Court, including failure to abstain from public comment about a pending proceeding in his own court.
5. interference with legal process and remedies in the United States District Court and/or Alabama Supreme Court related to proceedings in which Alabama probate judges were involved.
6. failure to recuse himself from pending proceedings in the Alabama Supreme Court after making public comment and placing his impartiality into question.

On May 27, Moore filed a federal lawsuit against the JIC (Moore v. Judicial Inquiry Commission), alleging that his automatic suspension was unconstitutional. On August 4, the federal district court dismissed Moore's suit, ruling that under the abstention doctrine, federal courts generally do not interfere with ongoing state court proceedings.

==== Suspension by the Court of the Judiciary ====
In June 2016, Moore filed a motion to dismiss the JIC proceedings, arguing, among other things, that the JIC and Alabama Court of the Judiciary lacked jurisdiction to review administrative orders that he issued and that the orders of the Alabama Supreme Court were still in effect from the Alabama Policy Institute proceedings prohibiting the issuance of same-sex marriage licenses by probate judges in Alabama, despite the rulings in Obergefell v. Hodges issued by the U.S. Supreme Court, Searcy v. Strange, Strawser v. Strange, and the decision of the U.S. Court of Appeals for the Eleventh Circuit, which held that the orders were abrogated by Obergefell. The Court of the Judiciary set a hearing date for the motion to dismiss and ruled that it would be treated as a motion for summary judgment pertaining to the charges filed by the JIC.

The Human Rights Campaign, an LGBT rights group, responded: "It is clear that Roy Moore not only believes he is above the law, he believes he is above judicial ethics ... Moore was tasked with upholding the law of the land when marriage equality was affirmed by the Supreme Court of the United States, and he defied that task, in the process harming loving, committed same-sex couples across Alabama for his own personal, discriminatory reasons."

In July 2016, the JIC filed a cross-motion for summary judgment, asking the Court of the Judiciary to issue summary judgment removing Moore from the bench. Attorneys for the JIC wrote: "Because the chief justice has proven – and promised – that he will not change his behavior, he has left this Court with no choice but to remove him from office to preserve the integrity, independence, impartiality of Alabama's judiciary and the citizens who depend on it for justice." In their reply, Moore (through his attorneys at Liberty Counsel) denied that Moore had directed Alabama's probate judges to disobey an injunction issued by the U.S. District Court for the Middle District of Alabama, asserting that the orders of the Alabama Supreme Court, which required Alabama's probate judges to deny marriage licenses to same-sex couples, were still in effect. Moore argued that his January 6 administrative order was mischaracterized by the JIC, despite the fact that the January 6 order stated "Until further decision by the Alabama Supreme Court, the existing orders of the Alabama Supreme Court that Alabama probate judges have a ministerial duty not to issue any marriage license contrary to the Alabama Sanctity of Marriage Amendment or the Alabama Marriage Protection Act remain in full force and effect."

At an August 2016 hearing before the Alabama Court of the Judiciary on the motions to dismiss and for summary judgment, Moore's attorneys continued to assert that Moore did not order probate judges to disobey the injunction issued by the U.S. District Court or the U.S. Supreme Court ruling on same-sex marriage. The attorney for the JIC responded that Moore's argument "defies common sense" and said that Moore was defying a federal court order, just as he did in 2003, and should be immediately removed from office. The Alabama Court of the Judiciary subsequently denied both Moore's motion and the JIC motion and set a trial date.

On September 30, 2016, Moore was found guilty of all six charges and suspended for the remainder of his term, slated to end in 2019. In its 50-page order, the Court of the Judiciary stated it did not find credible Moore's claim that the purpose for the January 6 order was "merely to provide a 'status update' to the state's probate judges". The ruling meant that Moore would not receive a salary paid for the remainder of his term. Moore also was ordered to pay court costs. The ruling effectively ended Moore's Supreme Court career, as he would not be eligible for reelection in 2018 because he would be above the maximum age of 69 years for a candidate.

==== Appeal to the Alabama Supreme Court and resignation ====
In October 2016, Moore filed a notice of appeal with the Court of the Judiciary appealing his suspension and the final judgment to the Alabama Supreme Court. Among other claims, Moore contended that neither the JIC nor the COJ had jurisdiction to investigate and punish him for his issuance of the Administrative Order of January 6, 2016; that the six charges against him had not been proven by clear and convincing evidence, and that by "suspending him" without pay for the remainder of his term, the COJ had effectively removed him from office without unanimous agreement of the COJ, as required under Alabama law. Pending the appeal, Moore refused to clean out his office.

The Alabama Supreme Court randomly selected seven retired judges to review the appeal of Moore's suspension, Governor Robert Bentley issued an executive order formally appointing the special Supreme Court of these seven retired justices to hear Moore's appeal from the decision of the COJ that suspended him from the bench for the remainder of his term.

In December 2016, Moore – represented by the group Liberty Counsel – filed his appeal brief with the special Alabama Supreme Court. Eight current and retired Alabama judges filed an amicus brief in support of Moore, asserting in their filings that Moore's suspension was, in fact, a removal from office and contrary to Alabama law since it required unanimous agreement of the COJ, despite the fact the COJ did unanimously agree in their final judgment to suspend Moore for the remainder of his term.

At Moore's request, oral argument was canceled to speed up the proceedings, and the special Supreme Court agreed to rule on the case based on the written submissions of the parties.

On April 20, the special Supreme Court upheld Moore's suspension. In its opinion, the special Supreme Court ruled that all of the JIC's charges against Moore were supported by clear and convincing evidence. The Court also ruled that it did not have authority to rescind the sanctions imposed on Moore because the charges were amply supported by clear and convincing evidence, and that the JIC was unanimous in their decision to suspend Moore for the remainder of his term.

Six days following the court's ruling, Moore resigned from the Alabama Supreme Court. He then announced he would be running for the United States Senate. Richard Shelby, Alabama's senior U.S. senator and a fellow Republican, harbored concerns about his candidacy long before sexual misconduct allegations surfaced, including his willingness as a judge to disobey judicial orders, saying, "I disagree with a lot of court decisions ... but still it's the law."

In 2022, his defamation lawsuit between him and a woman who accused him of sexual misconduct ended with neither party getting a judgment in its favor.

== Foundation for Moral Law ==
Moore founded the nonprofit Christian legal organization Foundation for Moral Law in 2002. Moore's wife, Kayla, is the president of the Foundation for Moral Law.

In 2005, Moore's Foundation for Moral Law accepted a $1,000 contribution from a neo-Nazi organization founded by Willis Carto, a prominent Holocaust denier. The donation attracted attention during Moore's 2017 campaign for a Senate seat.

=== Undisclosed salary payment controversy ===
Moore stated that he did not draw a "regular salary" from the organization. In October 2017, however, The Washington Post reported that Moore had arranged an annual salary of $180,000 for himself from the foundation. From 2007 to 2012, he collected more than $1 million, an amount far surpassing the nonprofit's declarations in its public tax filings, because of what the Post called "errors and gaps in the group's federal tax filings". The Washington Post reported that Moore arranged the salary and that, in 2012 when the charity could not pay his full salary, Moore received a note promising that he would get the salary in back pay or a stake in the assets of the foundation. The foundation paid for Moore's health-care benefits, travel expenses, and bodyguard, and the foundation's website has regularly promoted Moore's speaking arrangements and book. It employed at least two of Moore's children and Moore's wife. She was paid $65,000 annually after he again took his seat on the Alabama Supreme Court. The Washington Post also said that there was considerable overlap between the charity and Moore's political activities, with previous top officials of the charity leading Moore's 2017 Senate campaign and with the charity using the same fundraising firm as Moore's campaigns.

The foundation's former chair, Alabama circuit court judge John Bentley, denied that the board did anything wrong intentionally, but was unable to explain shortcomings in tax filings and audits. He admitted that the board failed to provide sufficient oversight and that he personally had been less involved than his position required. He acknowledged the foundation was effectively run entirely by Moore and his family.

The Internal Revenue Service (IRS) warned the foundation about discrepancies in its tax filings in 2013, saying that the issues "could jeopardize your exempt status". Multiple charity and tax law experts have said that the foundation's activities "raised questions about compliance with IRS rules, including prohibitions on the use of a charity for the private benefit or enrichment of an individual". Additional reporting by The Washington Post that October found the $498,000 Moore was guaranteed in back pay was not declared to the IRS; tax experts say that it should have been and that Moore would have had to pay more than $100,000 in federal tax.

== Election issues and campaigns ==
=== 2004 ===
Moore considered running for the nomination of the Republican Party and the Constitution Party in the 2004 presidential election. Despite encouragement from several corners, Moore did not pursue the nomination.

In 2004, along with Herb Titus, Moore was an original drafter of the Constitution Restoration Act, which sought to remove federal courts' jurisdiction over a government official or entity's "acknowledgment of God as the sovereign source of law, liberty, or government", and provided for the impeachment of judges who failed to do so. The bill was introduced in both houses of Congress in 2004 and then reintroduced in 2005, but languished in committee both times.

=== 2006 ===
In October 2005, Moore announced that he would run against Governor Bob Riley in the 2006 Republican gubernatorial primary. Moore's campaign relied largely on his popularity among Christian right voters. However, Moore consistently performed poorly in polling and in fundraising.

In the June 2006 primary, Riley won the primary, 306,665 (66.6 percent) to 153,354 (33.34 percent). Following such a major defeat, Moore accused Alabama Republican Party chair Twinkle Andress Cavanaugh of bias towards Riley and called on her to resign; he also criticized President Bush for praising Riley's administration. His criticism of the state Republican Party was so harsh that he eventually had to call a press conference to quell rumors that he would run as an independent if he lost the Republican primary. In his concession speech, Moore told supporters that "God's will has been done." Moore did not call Riley to concede and refused to support Riley in the general election because of Riley's acceptance of campaign contributions from political action committees.

=== 2010 ===
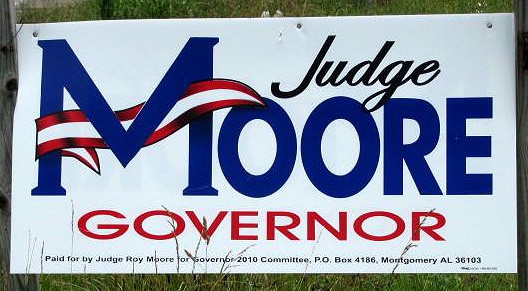
Roy Moore campaign sign, 2010

In 2009, Moore launched another campaign for governor of Alabama in 2010 election. In the first round of the June 2010 Republican primary election, Moore came in fourth place with 19.3% of the vote, behind Bradley Byrne (27.9%), Robert J. Bentley (25.2%), and Tim James (25.1%).

=== 2012 ===
Roy Moore received 52% of the vote in his successful campaign for Chief Justice of the Alabama Supreme Court.

On April 18, 2011, Moore announced that he was forming an exploratory committee to run in the Republican presidential primaries in 2012. When that campaign failed to gain traction, he began to draw speculation in the media as being a potential Constitution Party presidential contender. In November 2011, Moore withdrew his exploratory committee and ended all speculation of a presidential candidacy when he instead announced that he would in 2012 seek his former post of chief justice of the Alabama Supreme Court. On November 6, 2012, Moore won election back to the office of Alabama chief justice, defeating replacement Democratic candidate Bob Vance.

=== 2017 ===
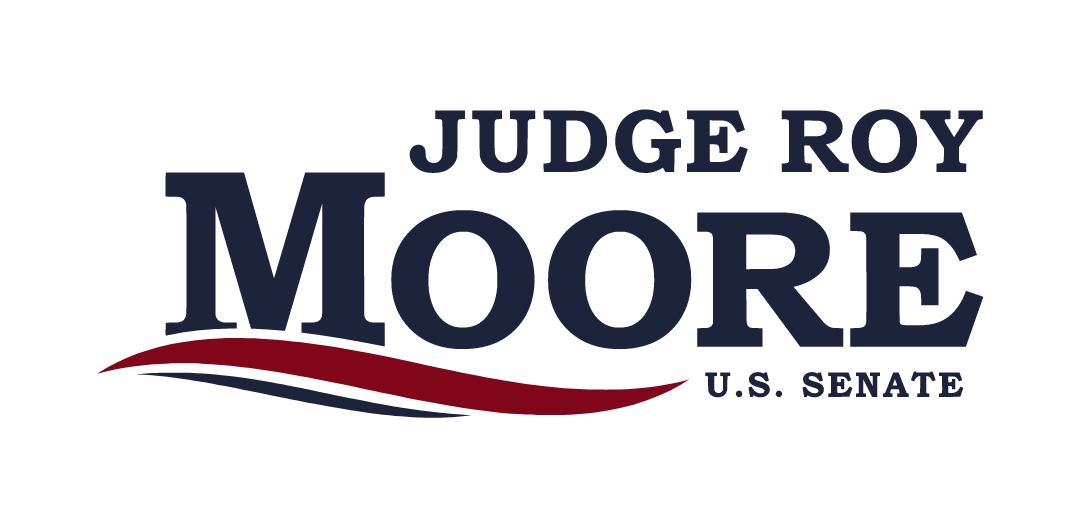
Roy Moore campaign sign, 2017

On April 26, 2017, Moore, who had been suspended from the Alabama Supreme Court since September 2016, stated that he had submitted retirement papers and would resign as chief justice in order to run for the U.S. Senate seat vacated earlier by Jeff Sessions, who left the Senate to become U.S. attorney general. Governor Robert J. Bentley appointed Luther Strange to fill the vacancy, and Strange also sought the Republican nomination in the special election.

==== Republican U.S. Senate primary ====
On August 15, 2017, Moore and Strange advanced to the primary runoff after Moore finished first with 38.9% of the vote to Strange's 32.8%. President Donald Trump reluctantly supported Moore's opponent Strange during the primary, dispensing with traditional presidential caution in becoming involved with contested primaries, and almost the whole national Republican establishment wanted Strange to win. Trump's efforts on behalf of Strange included a series of tweets, and a rally in Alabama, where he admitted that he "might have made a mistake" in his endorsement of Strange and emphasized repeatedly that he would support Moore if he won, but still urged voters to vote for Strange.

Moore was outspent in the runoff by a margin of 10-to-1, thanks in part to the efforts of Senate majority leader Mitch McConnell. On September 26, 2017, Moore defeated Strange in the Republican primary runoff election to become the Republican nominee. This marked the first time since 2010 that an insurgent defeated an incumbent U.S. Senator having active White House support. The percentages were 54.6% for Moore to 45.4% for Strange.

==== U.S. Senate special election campaign ====
Roy Moore received 48% of the vote in his unsuccessful campaign in the special election for representing Alabama in the Senate.

Moore faced Democratic nominee Doug Jones, a former United States attorney, and several write-in candidates in a special election on December 12, 2017. Moore turned down debate invitations extended by the League of Women Voters and WHNT-TV and AL.com. Moore said that he refused to debate Jones because of Jones's "very liberal stance on transgenderism and transgenderism in the military and in bathrooms".

In early November, when sexual misconduct allegations against Moore were reported, many Republicans at the national level called for Moore to drop out of the race or withdrew their endorsements of him. At the time of the revelations, it was too close to the election for Moore's name to be removed from the ballot. Senate Majority Leader Mitch McConnell and House Speaker Paul Ryan said he should step aside, as did U.S. Senator John McCain and former U.S. presidential candidate Mitt Romney. Other senators withdrew their endorsements of Moore's Senate candidacy. President Donald Trump initially said Moore should step aside if the charges were true, but otherwise expressed support for Moore. Trump later formally endorsed Moore. Alabama Republicans largely defended Moore from the accusations; an exception was Richard Shelby, the state's U.S. senator since 1987, who said two days before the election the accusations against Moore were "believable" and that "Alabama deserves better." He said he wrote in the name of another Republican on his absentee ballot.

The Republican National Committee (RNC) and the National Republican Senatorial Committee (NRSC) temporarily withdrew funding from his campaign.

A week before the election, Trump strongly endorsed Moore. Following Trump's endorsement, the RNC reinstated their support for him, and McConnell said he would "let the people of Alabama decide" whether to elect Moore. Just four days before the election, Trump appeared at a rally in Pensacola, Florida, near the border of Alabama, and again endorsed Moore.

During a campaign speech in Florence, Alabama, in 2017, Moore decried racial divisions plaguing the United States, stating: "Now we have blacks and whites fighting, reds and yellows fighting, Democrats and Republicans fighting, men and women fighting. What's going to unite us? What's going to bring us back together? A president? A Congress? No. It's going to be God." Moore's reference to "reds" and "yellows" was criticized as racially insensitive. Moore's campaign responded, stating that his statement was based on the religious song "Jesus Loves the Little Children". In the same speech, when a spectator asked when Moore thought America was last great, Moore responded: "I think it was great at the time when families were united. Even though we had slavery, they cared for one another. ... Our families were strong, our country had a direction."

In the December 12 election, Moore lost to Jones, who received 671,151 votes (49.9%) to Moore's 650,436 votes (48.4%). Moore refused to concede despite Trump, Bannon, and others urging him to do so. He told his followers in a YouTube video posted to his campaign account that "it's not over." He added that he wanted to wait for military votes to be counted and the results to be certified. A number of right-leaning websites pushed conspiracy theories about voter fraud providing the margin for Jones.

Alabama secretary of state John Merrill told The Washington Post that the result would be certified on December 28, 2017. If the final margin of victory had been less than 0.5%, then a recount would have been automatically triggered. In cases where the margin is greater than 0.5 percent, either candidate can request a recount at his or her expense. However, Merrill estimated that a recount could cost anywhere from $1 million to $1.5 million, an amount that must be paid in full when the request is made. Moore had only $636,046 on hand by the time the campaign ended. On December 28, Merrill and Alabama governor Kay Ivey certified the results of the senatorial election despite a last-minute lawsuit from the Moore campaign (rejected by a state judge) seeking a new election on the grounds of voter fraud.

Moore became the first Republican to lose a statewide race in Alabama since Republican Twinkle Andress Cavanaugh lost the 2008 president of the Alabama Public Service Commission election to Democratic former lieutenant governor Lucy Baxley. Moore was the first Republican to lose a United States Senate election in Alabama since Richard Sellers in 1992. Jones became the first Democrat to gain a Senate seat since Richard Shelby defeated incumbent Republican Jeremiah Denton in 1986 in a similarly narrow election, though Shelby joined the Republican Party eight years later. Jones also became the first Democrat to represent Alabama in the United States Senate since Howell Heflin's retirement in 1997.

In April 2018, Moore filed a lawsuit in Etowah County alleging "there was a political conspiracy against him in the 2017 special election". The former was filed against sexual misconduct accusers that came to prominence during the election. Most of its claims were dismissed in 2022.

=== 2020 ===
Moore announced on June 20, 2019, that he would challenge Doug Jones once again for his Senate seat in the 2020 election. He failed to earn the Republican party nomination, receiving only 7.2% of the vote in the primary election.

== Political positions ==
According to Business Insider, Moore has a "history of far-right and conspiracy-aligned positions" on issues such as homosexuality, race, Islam, and terrorism. According to CNN, Moore's "virulent anti-gay, right-wing views made him a national figure". According to The New York Times, Moore "is a staunch evangelical Christian, and his often-inflammatory political beliefs are informed by his strongly held religious views". Moore has been considered a "rising star of the alt-right movement" by The Jerusalem Post and an "alt-right hero" by The Washington Post.

=== Abortion ===
Moore is strongly anti-abortion. In a 2014 Supreme Court ruling, he said that laws should protect life "from the moment of conception". He seeks to defund Planned Parenthood.

=== American exceptionalism ===
Moore has been skeptical of modern American exceptionalism, saying that "America promotes a lot of bad things." Moore argued that the United States is an "Evil Empire" comparable to the Soviet Union, saying that America is "the focus of evil in the modern world". When asked for a clarification, Moore gave an example of America culturally exporting acceptance of homosexuality around the world.

=== "Birther" movement and other conspiracy theories ===
Moore was a leading proponent of the birther movement, the debunked conspiracy theory postulating that Barack Obama is not a U.S. citizen. He repeatedly promoted the conspiracy theory from 2008 and through to at least December 2016. Asked if he still questioned Obama's citizenship in August 2017, the Moore campaign declined to answer questions from the media. As chief justice of the Supreme Court of Alabama, he opined that Alabama's secretary of state should "investigate the qualifications of those candidates who appeared on the 2012 general-election ballot". In 2011, Moore appeared twice on the Aroostook Watchmen radio program, a conspiracy-theory show hosted by two Maine men who promote "birther" falsehoods as well as "false flag" conspiracy theories about the September 11 attacks, the Sandy Hook massacre, Boston bombing, and other mass shootings and terrorist attacks.

Moore has also suggested, without providing any evidence, that former president Barack Obama is secretly a Muslim.

=== Church and state ===
Because of his focus on religion in politics, he has earned the nickname of 'Ayatollah of Alabama' among his critics.

In a January 2014 speech in Mississippi, Moore said that the Framers of the Declaration of Independence and the Founding Fathers attributed our rights to "life, liberty, and the pursuit of happiness" as coming from a specific God, stating "Buddha didn't create us, Mohammed didn't create us, it was the God of the Holy Scriptures." The speech prompted criticism because it appeared to suggest that non-Christians did not enjoy religious protections under the First Amendment. In a subsequent interview, Moore said that the First Amendment protects all faiths: "It applies to the rights God gave us to be free in our modes of thinking, and as far as religious liberty to all people, regardless of what they believe."

=== Civil rights ===
Moore was a strong opponent of a proposed amendment to the Alabama Constitution in 2004. Known as Amendment 2, the proposed legislation would have removed wording from the state constitution that referred to poll taxes and required separate schools for "white and colored children", a practice already outlawed due to civil rights-era legislation during the Civil Rights Movement. Moore and other opponents of the measure argued that the amendment's wording would have allowed federal judges to force the state to fund public school improvements with increased taxes. Voters in Alabama narrowly defeated the proposed amendment, with a margin of 1,850 votes out of 1.38 million cast. Moore's opposition has been cited as a reason for the failure of the referendum.

In 2011, Moore said on Aroostook Watchmen, a right-wing conspiracy radio show that getting rid of all the constitutional amendments after the Tenth Amendment would "eliminate many problems". Amendments adopted after the Tenth Amendment include the Thirteenth Amendment (which abolished slavery); the Fifteenth Amendment (which barred the government from denying persons the right to vote based on the "race, color, or previous condition of servitude"); and the Nineteenth Amendment (which guaranteed women's suffrage). In the same appearance, when asked about the Fourteenth Amendment to the United States Constitution (which provides for equal protection of the laws), Moore said that he has "very serious problems with its approval by the states". During his 2017 campaign, when asked about these statements, a spokesman for Moore said that he did not favor repeal of these amendments but was merely expressing concern over "the historical trend since the ratification of the Bill of Rights" of "federal empowerment over state empowerment".

In a November 2017 speech at a revival in Jackson, Roy Moore stated that "they started [to] create new rights in 1965, and today we've got a problem" in an apparent reference to the Voting Rights Act of 1965.

=== Confederacy ===
Neo-Confederate groups held events at the Foundation for Moral Law, a foundation led by Moore, in 2009 and 2010. The events "promoted a history of the Civil War sympathetic to the Confederate cause, in which the conflict is presented as one fought over the federal government violating the South's sovereignty as opposed to one fought chiefly over the preservation of slavery".

The foundation's then-executive director, Rich Hobson, now Moore's campaign manager, claimed in 2010 that Moore was unaware of these events and that it was Hobson who approved them.

=== Divine retribution ===
In August 2017, Moore suggested that the September 11 attacks were a punishment by God for Americans' declining religiosity. Moore has also suggested that the Sandy Hook shooting, which killed 28 people (including 20 children), was "because we've forgotten the law of God". Moore has also said that suffering in the United States may be because "we legitimize sodomy" and "legitimize abortion". The Washington Post commented that "among the prices [Moore] says this country has paid for denying God's supremacy: the high murder rate in Chicago, crime on the streets of Washington, child abuse, rape and sodomy."

=== Education ===
In 2007, Moore opposed preschool, claiming that attendees are "much more likely to learn a liberal social and political philosophy" and that state involvement in early childhood education is characteristic of totalitarianism.

=== Evolution ===
Moore rejects the theory of evolution, saying "There is no such thing as evolution. That we came from a snake? No, I don't believe that." In 2010, Moore ran attack ads in the Republican gubernatorial primary against his opponent Bradley Byrne, questioning Byrne's faith on the grounds that he had supported the teaching of evolution while on a local school board. (In response, Byrne ran ads claiming to be a creationist.)

=== Free speech ===
In an October 2017 interview with Time, Moore said regarding NFL players who protested police violence by kneeling during the playing of the national anthem: "It's against the law, you know that? It was a [sic] act of Congress that every man stand and put their hand over their heart. That's the law." This assertion is incorrect assuming Moore was calling for enforcement; for civilians, the United States Flag Code, which outlines proper conduct when the national anthem is played, is an advisory description of proper etiquette, not an enforceable law. The US Flag Code does not reference standing for the national anthem.

=== Immigration ===
In July 2017, Moore stated that he was unfamiliar with what the Dreamer program was. Later, in September 2017, Moore criticized Deferred Action for Childhood Arrivals (DACA), which grants temporary stay to unauthorized immigrants brought to the United States as children.

=== Opposition to Islam ===
Moore has called for banning Muslims from serving in Congress, described Islam as a "false religion" and made unsubstantiated claims about Sharia law in the United States. When asked by a reporter where in the United States that Sharia law was being practiced, Moore said "Well, there's Sharia law, as I understand it, in Illinois, Indiana – up there. I don't know." Asked if it was not an amazing claim for a Senate candidate to make, Moore said "Well, let me just put it this way – if they are, they are; if they're not, they're not."

In 2006, Moore wrote that Keith Ellison of Minnesota, the first Muslim to have been elected to the United States House of Representatives, should be barred from sitting in Congress because in his view, a Muslim could not honestly take the oath of office. Moore said that the Quran did not allow for religions other than Islam to exist, and added, "common sense alone dictates that in the midst of a war with Islamic terrorists we should not place someone in a position of great power who shares their doctrine."

=== Trade ===
When asked whether he approved of free trade, Moore stated that he supported protectionism. Moore has suggested pulling out of various free trade agreements, saying that he would rescind "unfair free trade agreements which have severely damaged our economy".

=== Views on LGBT people ===
Moore has been described as holding "virulently anti-gay" beliefs. Moore is supportive of laws to make homosexuality illegal, and has argued that same-sex parents are unfit to raise children, that openly gay individuals should not be allowed to serve in government, and that the legitimization of various forms of "sodomy" may cause suffering in the United States. He believes that homosexuality goes against "the laws of nature" and stated it is comparable to bestiality.

In 1996, while presiding over a divorce case, Moore ruled that a mother who had had a lesbian affair would lose custody of her children to the father and that she could not be allowed to see her children unless she was supervised. Moore wrote in his ruling, "The court strongly feels that the minor children will be detrimentally affected by the present lifestyle of [Mrs. Borden] who has engaged in a homosexual relationship during her marriage, forbidden both by the laws of the State of Alabama and the Laws of Nature." The Court of Civil Appeals removed Moore from the case, a decision that was later affirmed by the Alabama Supreme Court.

In February 2002, as Alabama Chief Justice, Moore issued a controversial opinion that expressed his belief that the state should use its powers to punish "homosexual behavior". The case, D.H. v. H.H., was a custody dispute where a lesbian was petitioning for custody of her children, alleging abuse by her ex-husband. A circuit court in Alabama had ruled in favor of the father, but the Alabama Court of Civil Appeals overturned that verdict 4–1, saying that substantial evidence existed of abusive behavior by the father. In a concurring opinion in the case, Moore stated that a parent's homosexuality should be a deciding factor in determining which parent gets custody over children: "Homosexual behavior is a ground for divorce, an act of sexual misconduct punishable as a crime in Alabama, a crime against nature, an inherent evil, and an act so heinous that it defies one's ability to describe it. That is enough under the law to allow a court to consider such activity harmful to a child."

In 2016, Moore was suspended from the Alabama Supreme Court for instructing state probate judges to deny marriage licenses to same-sex couples, in contravention of Obergefell v. Hodges, in which the U.S. Supreme Court determined that same-sex couples have a constitutional right to marry.

In 2017, Moore called for impeaching judges who have issued rulings supportive of homosexuality and same-sex marriage. In November 2016, Moore argued that the Obergefell ruling was worse than the 1857 Dred Scott v. Sandford ruling (which declared that African-Americans, whether enslaved or free, were property and could not be American citizens). The Dred Scott ruling is widely considered as the worst Supreme Court ruling.

In November 2017, Moore said that transgender people "don't have rights".

=== Vladimir Putin and Russia interference ===
Moore has praised Russian president Vladimir Putin, stating that he is maybe "more akin to me than I know". When asked whether he believed that Russia interfered in the 2016 United States elections, Moore stated, "Everybody else thinks it's the Russians. I think it was the providential hand of God."

== Sexual misconduct allegations ==
In November 2017, during Moore's U.S. Senate campaign, nine women accused him of inappropriate sexual or social conduct. Three of the women said they had been sexually assaulted by Moore when they were aged 14, 16, and 28. The other six described him pursuing a romantic relationship with them while he was in his 30s and they were as young as 16, but said there had not been any inappropriate sexual contact. Moore denied the sexual assault allegations, but did not dispute that he had approached or dated teenagers over the age of 16 (the age of consent in Alabama). Independent witnesses confirmed that Moore had a reputation for approaching teenage girls, often at a local mall, and asking them out.

Moore has offered contradictory responses on whether he knew his accusers. He had said on November 10 that he did "recognize" the maiden names of Debbie Wesson Gibson and Gloria Thacker Deason (both Gibson and Deason had alleged that Moore had dated them when they were 17–18) and remembered each "as a good girl". Regarding if he had dated Gibson, Moore said "I can't recall the specific dates because that's been 40 years." On November 27 and 29, Moore took a different stance, repeatedly stating "I do not know any of these women" while also saying that "pictures of young children – whose names are not mentioned and I do not know – appear conveniently on the opposition's ads ... These allegations are completely false."

Following the allegations, Moore appeared as a guest on Sacha Baron Cohen's 2018 comedy series Who Is America? in which Baron Cohen, disguised as Israeli anti-terrorism expert Erran Morad, demonstrates new "technology", supposedly developed by the Israeli Army to identify pedophiles. Moore walked out of the interview after the device repeatedly indicated he was a pedophile. In September 2018, Moore filed a lawsuit against Baron Cohen, Showtime, and CBS Corporation seeking $95 million in damages for alleged fraud, defamation, and emotional distress. The lawsuit was filed in the United States District Court for the District of Columbia and argued that the consent agreement signed by Moore was "obtained through fraud" and was therefore "void and inoperative." In October 2018, Showtime moved for a change of venue to the United States District Court for the Southern District of New York. Despite the consent agreement specifying that any disputes be dealt with in a New York court, Moore's legal team opposed the change in venue, describing the move as "purely tactical, as they clearly perceive New York to a more favorable forum, where they will more than likely find a favorable left-leaning, pro-entertainment industry judge." Moore's legal team also contended that he had been "fraudulently induced" to appear on the show by two primary misrepresentations: Firstly, that Moore was under the impression that he was being flown to Washington D.C. to receive an award for his support of Israel; and, secondly, that he was told that the segment was being produced by an Israeli production company named Yerushalayim TV.

In July 2021, Moore's lawsuit was dismissed by Southern District of New York Judge John Cronan, who wrote that "Moore's claims are barred by the unambiguous contractual language, which precludes the very causes of action he now brings." This decision was upheld in July 2022, with the appeals court writing in its unsigned summary order that "Baron Cohen may have implied (despite his in character disclaimers of any belief that Judge Moore was a pedophile) that he believed Judge Moore's accusers, but he did not imply the existence of any independent factual basis for that belief besides the obviously farcical pedophile detecting 'device,' which no reasonable person could believe to be an actual, functioning piece of technology." Responding to the judgement, Moore told the Associated Press that Baron Cohen's "pusillanimous and fraudulent conduct must be stopped," and that he will be making a further appeal.

In August 2022, Moore was awarded $8.2 million by a jury from Anniston, Alabama, in a defamation lawsuit against a Democratic-aligned super PAC over their use of the allegations in advertisements. On April 24, 2026, the United States Court of Appeals for the Eleventh Circuit overturned the jury award and remanded the case with instructions. On October 5, 2026, the United States Supreme Court declined to hear a challenge from Moore.

== Personal life ==
He is a Baptist Christian, a member of the Gallant First Baptist Church.

Moore first saw his future wife, Kayla Kisor, when she was in her mid-teens performing at a dance recital. Moore was 31 at the time. In his 2005 autobiography, Moore described his reaction, writing: "I knew Kayla was going to be a special person in my life." In 1984, Moore and Kayla Kisor Heald met again at a Christmas party but she was then a married mother. She filed for divorce from her first husband on December 28, 1984, and was divorced on April 19, 1985. Moore married Kayla on December 14, 1985. He was 38, she was 24. They have four adult children.

Moore wrote weekly columns for the far-right website WorldNetDaily from 2006 to 2009.

== Electoral history ==
2000 Alabama Supreme Court election, Chief Justice

Republican primary
Party	Candidate	Votes	%
Republican	Roy Moore	115,204	54.6%
Republican	Harold See	63,604	30.1%
Republican	Pam Baschab	17,869	8.5%
Republican	Wayne Thorn	14,369	6.8%
Total votes		211,046	100%

General election
Party	Candidate	Votes	%
Republican	Roy Moore	878,480	54.6%
Democratic	Sharon Gilbert Yates	726,348	45.2%
Write-In	Write-ins	3,451	0.2%
Total votes		1,608,279	100%

2006 Alabama gubernatorial election

Republican primary
Party	Candidate	Votes	%
Republican	Bob Riley (incumbent)	306,665	66.7%
Republican	Roy Moore	153,354	33.3%
Total votes		460,019	100%

2010 Alabama gubernatorial election

Republican primary
Party	Candidate	Votes	%
Republican	Bradley Byrne	137,349	27.9%
Republican	Robert J. Bentley	123,870	25.2%
Republican	Tim James	123,662	25.1%
Republican	Roy Moore	95,077	19.3%
Republican	Bill Johnson	8,350	1.7%
Republican	Charles Taylor	2,622	0.5%
Republican	James Potts	1,549	0.3%
Total votes		492,480	100%

2012 Chief Justice of the Alabama Supreme Court election

Republican primary
Party	Candidate	Votes	%
Republican	Roy Moore	282,743	50.4%
Republican	Charles Graddick	141,570	25.2%
Republican	Chuck Malone (incumbent)	136,927	24.4%
Total votes		561,240	100%

General election
Party	Candidate	Votes	%
Republican	Roy Moore	1,051,627	51.8%
Democratic	Robert Vance	977,301	48.1%
Write-In	Write-ins	2,189	0.1%
Total votes		2,031,117	100%

2017 United States Senate special election in Alabama

Republican primary
Party	Candidate	Votes	%
Republican	Roy Moore	164,524	38.9%
Republican	Luther Strange (incumbent)	138,971	32.8%
Republican	Mo Brooks	83,287	19.7%
Republican	Trip Pittman	29,124	6.9%
Republican	Randy Brinson	2,978	0.6%
Republican	Bryan Peeples	1,579	0.4%
Republican	Mary Maxwell	1,543	0.4%
Republican	James Beretta	1,078	0.3%
Republican	Dom Gentile	303	0.1%
Republican	Joseph Breault	252	0.1%
Total votes		423,282	100%

Republican primary runoff
Party	Candidate	Votes	%
Republican	Roy Moore	262,204	54.6%
Republican	Luther Strange (incumbent)	218,066	45.4%
Total votes		480,270	100%

General election results
Party	Candidate	Votes	%
Democratic	Doug Jones	673,896	50.0%
Republican	Roy Moore	651,972	48.3%
Write-In	Write-ins	22,852	1.7%
Total votes		1,348,720	100%
Democratic gain from Republican			

2020 United States Senate election in Alabama

Republican primary
Party	Candidate	Votes	%
Republican	Tommy Tuberville	239,616	33.4%
Republican	Jeff Sessions	227,088	31.6%
Republican	Bradley Byrne	178,627	24.9%
Republican	Roy Moore	51,377	7.2%
Republican	Ruth Page Nelson	7,200	1.0%
Republican	Arnold Mooney	7,149	1.0%
Republican	Stanley Adair	6,608	0.9%
Total votes		717,665	100%

== See also ==
- Me Too movement
- Weinstein effect

Legal offices
Preceded by Perry Hooper	Chief Justice of the Alabama Supreme Court; 2001–2003	Succeeded by Gorman Houston; Acting
Preceded by Chuck Malone	Chief Justice of the Alabama Supreme Court; 2013–2016	Succeeded by Lyn Stuart
Party political offices
Preceded by Jeff Sessions	Republican nominee for U.S. Senator from Alabama (Class 2); 2017	Succeeded by Tommy Tuberville
