= Joyce Vance =

American lawyer (born 1960)

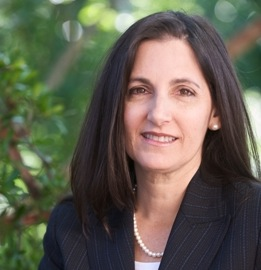

United States Attorney for the Northern District of Alabama
- In office August 7, 2009 – January 20, 2017
- Appointed by: Barack Obama
- Preceded by: Alice Martin
- Succeeded by: Jay Town

Personal details
- Born: Joyce Alene White; July 22, 1960 (age 66) St. George, Utah, U.S.
- Spouse: Bob Vance
- Children: 4
- Education: Bates College (BA); University of Virginia (JD)

Joyce Alene Vance (born July 22, 1960) is an American lawyer who served as the United States attorney for the Northern District of Alabama from 2009 to 2017. She was one of the first five U.S. attorneys, and the first female U.S. attorney, nominated by President Barack Obama.

== Early life and career ==
Joyce Alene White was born on July 22, 1960, in St. George, Utah. She was raised by a divorced mother in the middle-class Los Angeles suburb of Monterey Park, California. She received a Bachelor of Arts magna cum laude from Bates College in Lewiston, Maine, in 1982 and a Juris Doctor from the University of Virginia School of Law in 1985.

Vance was a litigator in private practice at Bradley Arant Boult Cummings LLP in Washington, DC, before joining the United States Attorney's Office in the Northern District of Alabama in 1991. She spent ten years in the Criminal Division, working on investigations including that of Eric Robert Rudolph, who bombed a Birmingham abortion clinic and killed a police officer and set a string of church fires in the district. She successfully prosecuted five Boaz, Alabama, police officers charged with Conspiracy to Violate Civil Rights. She moved to the Appellate Division in 2002 and became the Chief of that Division in 2005.

== U.S. attorney for the Northern District of Alabama ==
Vance was nominated to become U.S. attorney for the Northern District of Alabama by President Barack Obama on May 15, 2009, and unanimously confirmed by the U.S. Senate on August 7, 2009. She was sworn in on August 27, 2009, with U.S. Attorney General Eric Holder in attendance. Holder tapped Vance to serve on his first Attorney General's Advisory Committee of U.S. Attorneys in October 2009. Vance co-chaired the AGAC's Criminal Practice Subcommittee, along with Vermont U.S. Attorney Tristram Coffin.

Vance helmed the first case of material support of terrorism in the Northern District of Alabama in 2011. The defendant, Ulugbek Kodirov, pleaded guilty to charges of threatening to kill the President and material support of terrorism the following year and received a sentence of more than fifteen years in prison. Vance was also instrumental in building awareness about cyber crime and working with businesses in key sectors on threat minimization and critical incident response and prosecuted the first-ever cyber cases in the Northern District.

Vance was credited with pursuing public corruption prosecutions with integrity. Public corruption prosecutions were one of her top priorities. Maurice William Campbell, Director of the Alabama Small Business Development Consortium, was sentenced in March 2012 to more than 15 years in prison and ordered to pay $5.9 million restitution for using his position to obtain funds meant for small businesses for his own use. In 2013, she successfully prosecuted the Director of the Jefferson County Committee for Economic Opportunity for using half a million dollars of the agency's funds, meant for Headstart and other programs, to purchase real estate for herself. She also prosecuted cases involving corruption and other misconduct by law enforcement. She hired the first prosecutor in the Huntsville office dedicated solely to cyber prosecutions.

Vance developed a federal, state, and local law enforcement working group to deal with rapidly increasing heroin overdose deaths before the issue rose to national awareness. At one point, her office arrested and charged more than 40 heroin dealers and traffickers in one week. She held a community summit and initiated community-wide planning to develop partnerships between law enforcement, public health officials, and addiction prevention and treatment specialists. She continued to aggressively prosecute heroin traffickers throughout her time in office, ensuring that ringleaders received sentences of more than 20 years. The working group developed in a community-engaged initiative widely credited with working on all fronts to reduce heroin and prescription opiate addiction and overdose deaths,

Vance established a civil rights enforcement unit in the office. In 2011, she successfully challenged Alabama's immigration bill, HB 56, on constitutional grounds. The Eleventh Circuit Court of Appeals found key portions of the law unconstitutional, and in 2013 the District Court entered a settlement in which seven challenged provisions of the law were permanently blocked. Vance's office engaged with the University of Alabama on allegations of racial discrimination in sorority rush in the University of Alabama's sorority system when students brought to light the role of alumni in refusing admission to minority candidates.

In 2014, Vance prosecuted a man for trying to hire a KKK member to murder his African-American neighbor. Vance was involved in key work to protect the rights of Alabama voters, including a settlement of Alabama's violation of the Motor Voter Act that brought the state into compliance, and a settlement with Jefferson County, Alabama of countywide violations of access to the polls for citizens with disabilities. Vance, along with Civil Rights Division Assistant Attorney General Vanita Gupta, also launched a statewide investigation into inhumane conditions in Alabama's prisons.

In April 2014, Amedysis Home Health Care agreed to pay $150 million to settle claims of Medicare fraud against them that were pursued by Vance's office working together with DOJ's Civil Division and several other U.S. Attorney's Offices. A month earlier, Vance announced that Hospice Compassus would pay $3.9 million to resolve an investigation into Medicare fraud. Vance also oversaw a case in which American Family Care agreed to pay $1.2 million to the federal government under the False Claims Act. In June 2012, Rural/Metro Ambulance agreed to pay $5.4 million to resolve allegations that it was engaged in improper billing and provision of unnecessary service.

Vance prioritized fraud cases, prosecuting Jonathan Dunning for the $14 million fraud that diverted funds meant to provide healthcare to low-income individuals. She prosecuted a series of cases involving fraud in car loan origination. Following the tornadoes that swept through Alabama on April 27, 2011, doing severe damage across the region in what became known as the 2011 Super Outbreak, Vance's office took a zero-tolerance stance on disaster fraud. In April 2014 she successfully prosecuted a ring of five people who conspired to make $2.4 million in fraudulent claims against the BP Oil Deepwater Horizon compensation fund.

== Post U.S. Attorney career ==
In April 2017, the University of Alabama School of Law announced that Vance would join the law school as a Distinguished Visiting Lecturer in Law (effective August 2017) teaching in the areas of criminal justice reform, criminal procedure, and civil rights.

In 2018, she signed a contract to become an MSNBC contributor, frequently providing on-air commentary regarding developments in the Mueller investigation and other legal issues that involved the Trump administration. Since 2021, she also co-hosts the #SistersInLaw podcast with Jill Wine-Banks, Barbara McQuade and Kimberly Atkins Stohr, and the Cafe Insider podcast with fellow former U.S. Attorney Preet Bharara. In June 2022, Vance launched the Civil Discourse newsletter, which has since gained a readership of over 215,000 subscribers. She sits on the bipartisan advisory board of States United Democracy Center. In 2024 Joyce Vance joined the Brennan Center for Justice at New York University School of Law as a senior fellow.

== Personal life ==
Vance is married to Bob Vance, a Jefferson County Circuit Court judge. They have four children. Vance is the daughter-in-law of federal judge Robert S. Vance, who was murdered by a mail bomb in 1989.

Vance is Jewish.

== Books ==
- Vance, Joyce (2025). Giving up Is Unforgivable: A Manual for Keeping a Democracy (1st hardcover ed.). New York: Dutton. ISBN 9798217178117. OCLC 1506493408.

== See also ==
- List of Jewish American jurists
