= Foundation for Moral Law =

US Christian right legal advocacy group

- Formation: January 29, 2003; 23 years ago
- Founder: Roy Moore
- Type: Nonprofit organization
- Tax ID no.: 03-0502850
- Legal status: 501(c)(3)
- Headquarters: Montgomery, Alabama, United States
- Coordinates: 32.377606°N 86.308826°W
- President: Kayla Moore
- President Emeritus: Roy Moore
- Revenue: $790,665 (2023)
- Expenses: $672,719 (2023)
- Employees: 6 (2023)
- Website: www.morallaw.org

The Foundation for Moral Law is a socially conservative, Christian right legal advocacy group based in Montgomery, Alabama.

The Foundation was established in 2003 by Republican politician Roy Moore, who was ousted as Chief Justice of the Supreme Court of Alabama in 2003 for refusing to comply with a federal court order to remove a Ten Commandments monument from the grounds of the Alabama Judicial Building. In 2013, Moore was again elected to the Alabama Supreme Court, but was suspended from the Court in 2016, and resigned in 2017, after ordering Alabama probate judges to ignore federal court decisions on same-sex marriage.

== History and finances ==
The Foundation for Moral Law was established in 2003 by Republican politician Roy Moore. Pastor Phillip Ellen became the first president of the Foundation for Moral Law in December 2002. Randy Stafford acted as vice president at that time, and Mel C. Glenn Sr. was executive director.

In November 2003, the board chose Rich Hobson as president of the Foundation for Moral Law, and Ellen became its vice president. Moore served as the president of the Foundation for Moral Law, and Hobson served as executive director. In 2013, Moore's wife, Kayla Moore, became president of the Foundation for Moral Law.

In 2005, the Internal Revenue Service (IRS) determined that the Foundation for Moral Law is a 501(c)(3) tax-exempt organization.

Also in 2005, the Foundation accepted a $1,000 contribution from a neo-Nazi organization founded by Willis Carto, a prominent Holocaust denier. The donation attracted attention during Moore's 2017 campaign for a Senate seat.

Moore said that he did not draw a "regular salary" from the organization. In October 2017, however, The Washington Post reported that Moore had arranged an annual salary of $180,000 for himself from the foundation. From 2007 to 2012, he collected more than $1 million, an amount that far surpasses what the organization declared in its public tax filings. Furthermore, The Washington Post reported that Moore arranged the salary and that, in 2012 when the charity could not pay his full salary, Moore received a note promising that he would get the salary in back pay or a stake in the assets of the foundation. The foundation also paid for Moore's health-care benefits, travel expenses, and bodyguard, and the foundation's website has regularly promoted Moore's speaking arrangements and book. Furthermore, the foundation employed Moore's wife and at least two of Moore's children. The Washington Post also reported that there was considerable overlap between the charity and Moore's political activities, with previous top officials of the charity leading Moore's 2017 Senate campaign and with the charity using the same fundraising firm as Moore's campaigns.

The IRS warned the foundation about discrepancies in its tax filings in 2013, saying that the issues "could jeopardize your exempt status". A number of charity and tax law experts have said that the foundation's activities "raised questions about compliance with IRS rules, including prohibitions on the use of a charity for the private benefit or enrichment of an individual". Additional reporting by The Washington Post that October found that the $498,000 that Moore was guaranteed in back pay was not declared to the IRS; tax experts say that it should have been and that Moore would have had to pay more than $100,000 in federal tax.

As of August 2017, the Foundation for Moral Law had not filed a Form 990 for 2015 or 2016, as required by law.

== Positions and activities ==
The Foundation for Moral Law advocates Moore's Christian right and socially conservative views through the filing of amicus briefs in courts. The group is anti-abortion, opposed to same-sex marriage, and supportive of public prayer. In 2010, the Foundation for Moral Law allowed its offices to be used to host an "Alabama Secession Day Commemoration" event, celebrating Alabama's secession from the Union in 1861. The event featured a speaker from the League of the South, a group that supports secession of the South from United States and is classified by the Southern Poverty Law Center as a hate group.

In 2017, the Foundation for Moral Law publicly opposed the U.S. Air Force's nomination of then-Colonel Kristin Goodwin as commandant of cadets of the U.S. Air Force Academy because Goodwin is a married lesbian; in a letter, the Foundation's president, Kayla Moore, accused the United States Department of Defense of having a "disregard for the fundamental moral order established by God."

In the case Gloucester County School Board v. G.G., the group filed an amicus brief in opposition to transgender rights.

In 2017, the Foundation for Moral Law came out in support of Executive Order 13780, a travel ban issued by President Donald Trump. The group said that it would back the executive order in the U.S. Supreme Court against constitutional challenges.
