= American Marriage Ministries =

Non-denominational Internet church

- Abbreviation: AMM
- Region: United States
- Headquarters: Seattle, Washington, U.S.
- Founder: Glen Yoshioka
- Origin: 2009
- Official website: theamm.org

American Marriage Ministries is a non-denominational Internet church based in Seattle. The church was founded by Glen Yoshioka in 2009 and ordains and trains people to officiate at weddings. The church is a secular non-denominational organization that does not promote any specific religious ideologies, instead allowing its ministers to define their own practice and faith. This allows ceremonies to be tailored to the beliefs of the couple. The church ordained Canadian singer Carly Rae Jepsen in 2017. The church had operated entirely online until June 2019, when its ministers began performing in-person ordinations in response to Tennessee passing a law disallowing ministers ordained online from solemnizing weddings in the state. According to Executive Director Lewis King, by June 2017 the church has ordained more than 715,000 people in the United States, including over 13,400 active ministers in Tennessee. The church performed mass ordinations in a number of cities in Tennessee, with the majority of attendees being those who had already been ordained online but need to update their status to comply with the new law.

== Officiant Training and State Registration ==
American Marriage Ministries offers online training tools and guidance available for free for ministers. AMM's Legal Requirements library is a database where ministers can look up state or county requirements. The organization also provides city-specific instructions on how to get ordained and perform marriage. For example, New York City is one of the stricter locations and requires wedding officiants to appear in person at the city clerk’s office to register (the city also charges a $15 fee.) Virginia is the most troublesome state, denying most ministers who get ordained online, but AMM has information on combating that on its website as well.

In 2022, AMM rolled out the Professional Wedding Officiant Certification course, an online training program that provides comprehensive training for ministers covering all aspects of officiating. The International Association of Professional Wedding Officiants (IAPWO) recognized American Marriage Ministries’ training course as the first IAPWO Accredited™ Wedding Officiant Training Program after launching its accreditation process and standards in 2021. The IAPWO Accredited™ designation is awarded to exceptional training and educational programs for professional officiants and celebrants, scoring each program's content and awarding credits toward IAPWO's Certified Professional Wedding Officiant (CPWO) credential for those who complete the program.

== Charitable Activities and Advocacy ==
American Marriage Ministries is active in two major areas of civic life -- supporting charities that share its values and beliefs, and defending marriage equality in states where lawmakers attempt to restrict who may or may not perform marriage. AMM has made donations of $500 or more to over 100 Non-Profit Charities across the country. Regarding marriage equality and freedom of religion, AMM is active in New York, Virginia, North Carolina, and Tennessee.

== Partnerships And Public Practices ==
American Marriage Ministries is active in the marriage equality and environmental preservation spaces. In 2018, American Marriage Ministries and the International Association of Professional Wedding Officiants (IAPWO) agreed to work together to educate first-time wedding officiants on how to perform wedding ceremonies, and to raise public awareness about the important role that professional wedding officiants play in the special events industry. American Marriage Ministries also partners with Carbon Fund to offset its carbon footprint and promote sustainable practices, especially in the wedding industry. American Marriage Ministries is not affiliated in any way with any other online churches such as the Universal Life Church (ULC) or any brick-and-mortar churches elsewhere in the country. However, AMM founder Glen Yoshioka was a former employee of Universal Life Church Monastery.
