= Robert E. Robinson =

American lawyer, civil rights activist, and politician (1947–1989)

Robbie Robinson
- Robinson in 1982
- Born: Robert Edward Robinson; July 30, 1947; Savannah, Georgia
- Died: December 18, 1989 (aged 42); Savannah, Georgia
- Cause of death: Mail bomb sent by Walter Moody
- Education: Savannah State University; University of Georgia School of Law
- Occupations: Attorney; Savannah City Councilmember

Robert Edward Robinson (July 30, 1947 – December 18, 1989) was an American lawyer, civil rights activist, and city councilmember in Savannah, Georgia. As a teenager, Robinson was involved in the integration of the city's school system and was part of a demonstration that contributed to the desegregation of Savannah Beach. He would later gain his Juris Doctor degree from the University of Georgia School of Law and practice law in Savannah, where he also was elected to the city council. He was murdered in 1989 by a mail bomb sent by Walter Moody, who would later be found guilty of murdering United States federal judge Robert Smith Vance in another mail bombing.

== Biography ==
=== Early life and education ===
Robert Edward Robinson was born in Savannah, Georgia on July 30, 1947 to Robert and Edna Robinson. Family members called him Edward to distinguish him from his father, but people outside of his family knew him as Robbie. His parents had met while attending the Georgia Industrial College (now Savannah State University) in Savannah, and they had two daughters before Robbie was born. Robbie's father was a Pullman porter and active member of the Brotherhood of Sleeping Car Porters, an African American-led labor union. Robinson was noted for his intelligence at a young age, enrolling in kindergarten at the age of four and entering the first grade in 1952 at the age of five.

On September 3, 1963, Robinson was part of a group of a dozen black students who enrolled in Savannah High School, a formerly all-white school, during the integration of the city's school system. He graduated the following year. According to an article about Robinson in The New York Times, one of his earliest involvements in the civil rights movement came in 1963, when he participated in an NAACP-organized "wade-in" event to desegregate the beach at Tybee Island, near Savannah. The event, a part of the Savannah Protest Movement, was led by local civil rights leader W. W. Law, and while the demonstrators were arrested, all charges against them were later dropped and the beach was desegregated. After graduating from high school, Robinson enlisted in the United States Air Force, where he was a military policeman. Robinson left the Air Force in the summer of 1968 and enrolled for classes at Savannah State University, where he studied accounting. During his time at Savannah State, Robinson married Vivian Cook, a friend of his sister's who had attended Paine College in Augusta, Georgia. He graduated magna cum laude from Savannah State in 1971, attaining his undergraduate degree in three years instead of the traditional four. Following this, Robinson received a scholarship to attend the Lumpkin Law School at the University of Georgia in Athens, Georgia. Robinson was one of the first three African Americans to enroll at this law school. He graduated in the summer of 1974. Robinson then worked for the Georgia Legal Services Program in Atlanta, and he would remain with the program for several years after passing the bar examination.

=== Return to Savannah ===
In 1976, Robinson became an intern for a law firm in Savannah, becoming an associate attorney at the firm later that year. In 1977, the firm split up and Robinson became a partner in another firm. He would later go into solo practice in 1981, opening his offices on Abercorn Street in the Savannah Victorian Historic District. Starting around this time, Robinson also served as the legal counsel for the local NAACP chapter. In 1980, following the birth of their second child, Vivian and Robbie separated. That same year, Robinson made his first foray into politics when he was appointed chairman of the Savannah Transportation Authority. In 1982, Robinson announced his candidacy as a member of the city council. Robinson proceeded to campaign against Joe Bell, a local banker who had been chosen by the white power brokers of Savannah to represent that city district, and while Bell's campaign finances severely eclipsed Robinson's, Robinson would go on to easily defeat Bell and win a spot on the city council. Robinson was one of three African Americans on the nine member council. While on the council, Robinson earned a reputation as a "district ombudsman", and he worked with Savannah mayor John Rousakis on establishing more recreational areas in his district. Robinson was reelected to the city council in 1986 with 82% of the vote.

=== Murder ===
On December 18, 1989, a mail bomb exploded in Robinson's law offices. The explosion caused fatal injuries to Robinson, who died later that day at Memorial Hospital in Savannah. The bombing occurred two days after another mail bombing incident involving United States federal judge Robert Smith Vance, who died at his home in Birmingham, Alabama. Vance had been a judge on the United States Court of Appeals for the Eleventh Circuit and had presided over several major civil rights cases. The perpetrator of these attacks was later found to be Walter Moody, a Georgian who had targeted individuals associated with the civil rights movement. He had targeted Robinson due to his work with the NAACP. Moody was eventually charged with Vance's murder and sentenced to death, which was carried out on April 19, 2018. Robinson's funeral was held four days after his death, during a rare snowstorm in Savannah.

In Robinson's memory, a parking garage, public park, and apartment building in Savannah were named after him. Additionally, a scholarship in his memory exists to aid students entering into either Paine College, Savannah State University, or the University of Georgia. In 2023, a historical marker was erected in honor of Robinson in Savannah at Cann Park, near the intersection of Bulloch Street and West 46th Street, within the bounds of Robinson's former city district.

== Sources ==
- Bauman, Sam (June 21, 2023). "Robert 'Robbie' Robinson historical marker unveiled". WTOC-TV. Archived from the original on June 30, 2023.
- Gusby, Kim (February 29, 2016). "Celebrating Black History: Remembering Robbie Robinson". WSAV-TV. Archived from the original on November 7, 2019.
- Jenkins, Ray (2012). Blind Vengeance: The Roy Moody Mail Bomb Murders. University of Georgia Press. ISBN 978-0-8203-4101-9.
- Komanecky, DeAnn (April 18, 2018). "Man behind Savannah bombing, murder of local leader Robbie Robinson to be executed Thursday". Savannah Morning News. GateHouse Media. Archived from the original on September 24, 2020.
- Morrison, Walter W. (January 1990). "Racists' Terror Tactics Won't Work, Hooks Vows". The Crisis. 97 (1). NAACP: I–III.
- Skutch, Jan (August 18, 2013). "Robbie Robinson paid the price for Savannah desegregation". Savannah Morning News. Morris Communications. Archived from the original on April 10, 2021.
- Smothers, Ronald (December 20, 1989). "Savannah Victim Is Called Quiet but Effective". The New York Times. ISSN 0362-4331. Archived from the original on December 20, 2017.
