= Alabama Judicial Building =

Heflin-Torbert Judicial Building
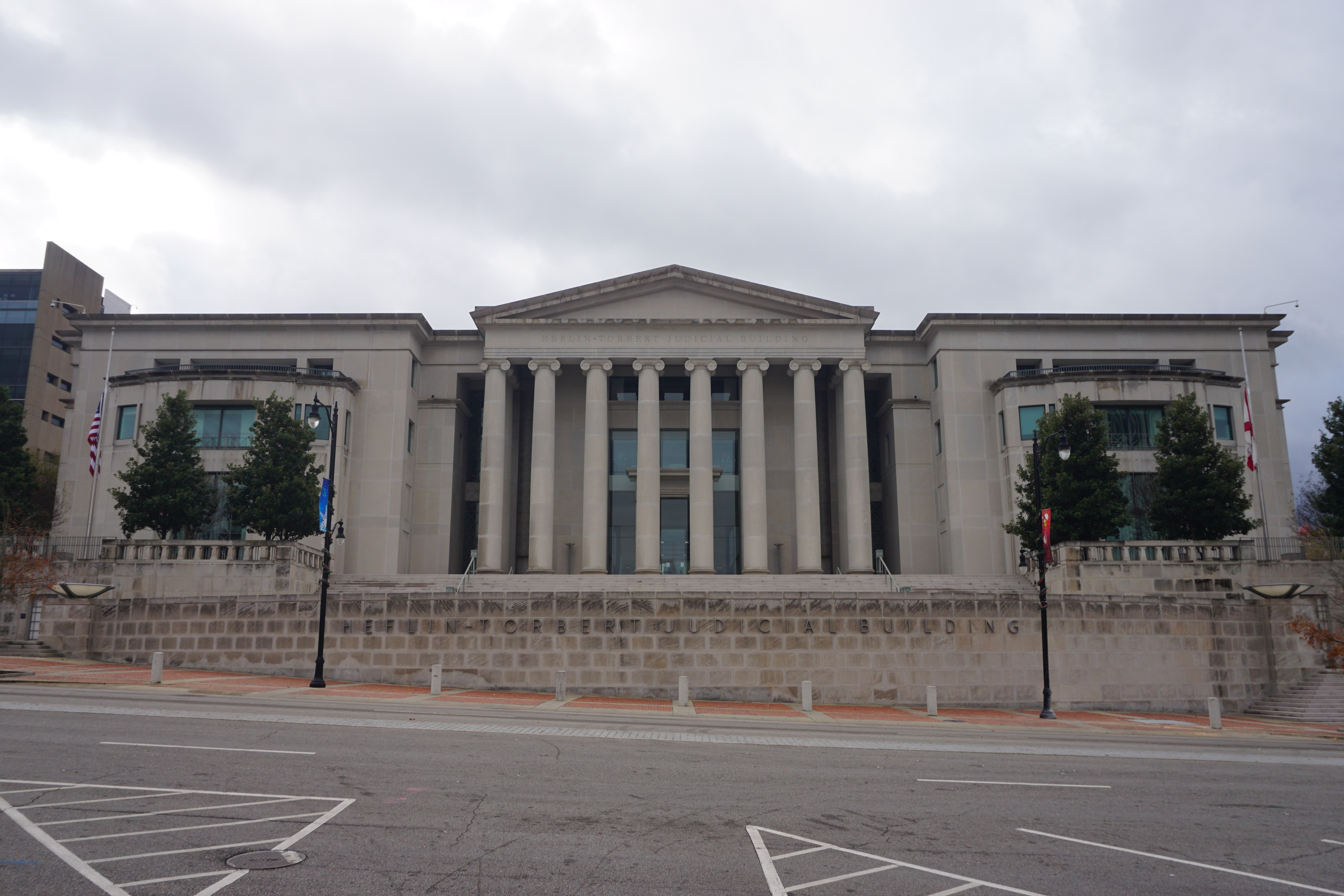
- The Heflin-Torbert Judicial Building
- Interactive map of the Heflin-Torbert Judicial Building area

General information
- Location: 300 Dexter Avenue; Montgomery, Alabama, United States
- Coordinates: 32°22′37″N 86°18′16″W
- Completed: 1994
- Cost: $35 million
- Owner: State of Alabama

Height
- Roof: 158 feet (48 m)

Technical details
- Floor count: 4 above ground, 2 below
- Floor area: 338,000 square feet (31,401 m^{2})

Heflin-Torbert Judicial Building, commonly called the Alabama Judicial Building, is a state government building in Montgomery, Alabama. It houses several state judicial agencies, most notably the Supreme Court of Alabama, Alabama Court of Civil Appeals, and Alabama Court of Criminal Appeals. It is the first state court building in the United States to house all three courts under one roof. Additionally, it houses the State Law Library.

The neoclassical-style structure was completed in 1994 at a cost of approximately $35 million.

In 2001, Roy Moore, who was Chief Justice at the time, placed a Ten Commandments monument on public display in the rotunda of the building. This placement of a religious monument in a government judicial building caused a nationwide controversy.

== Architecture and features ==
The Judicial Building is a modern interpretation of neoclassical architecture. It was designed by Barganier Davis Sims Architects Associated of Montgomery and Gresham, Smith and Partners of Birmingham. Situated on a city block measuring 300 by 320 feet (91 m × 98 m), it rises to a height of 158 feet (48 m) at the top of the 100-foot (30 m) wide dome. The building has a reinforced concrete and steel substructure, clad in Indiana limestone. A pedimented portico with ten monumental Ionic columns is centered on the front facade of the structure between projecting side-wings. The interior is arranged around a central rotunda that measures approximately 40 feet (12 m) tall and 75 feet (23 m) wide. The rotunda is faced in Carrara marble and features eight marble columns that are 34 feet (10 m) tall.

The building contains 338,000 square feet (31,401 m^{2}) of floorspace spread over six levels. A parking garage and mechanical systems are located on the basement level. The Administrative Office of Courts, Museum of Judicial History, and a visitor parking garage are located on the ground floor level. The main lobby level contains the primary entrance, as well as the State Law Library, Appellate Court Clerks' Offices, and the two-story rotunda. The Court of Civil Appeals, Court of Criminal Appeals, and their courtrooms are situated on the second level. A mezzanine level contains archival, conference, and storage rooms. The Supreme Court chamber is located on the third, top, level. It is situated above the rotunda and directly beneath the dome.

== Ten Commandments monument ==
Roy Moore was elected Chief Justice of the Supreme Court of Alabama on November 7, 2000. He was sworn in on January 15, 2001. It was revealed on August 1, 2001 that Moore had commissioned and placed a 5,280-pound (2,390 kg) granite replica of the Ten Commandments in the rotunda of the Judicial Building's the night before. This was all done without the prior knowledge or consent of the other eight justices of the Supreme Court.

Three lawyers then filed Glassroth v. Moore in the United States District Court for the Middle District of Alabama against Moore in his official capacity as Chief Justice to have the monument removed. The court found in favor of the plaintiffs, citing that the display was a violation of the Establishment Clause of the First Amendment. The District Court then entered its final judgment and injunction that ordered that it be removed from the building by August 20, 2003. Moore refused to comply. Thousands of protestors from around the country converged on the Judicial Building after the decision to rally against the removal of the monument.

Following Moore's non-compliance, the eight Associate Justices of the Alabama Supreme Court issued an order that recognized Moore's refusal to obey a binding order of a federal court and instructed that the building manager comply with the injunction. The monument was removed from the rotunda on August 27, 2003 and put into storage. Due to a variety of factors, including legal appeals and potential clashes with pro-monument protesters outside of the building, the monument was not removed from the building until July 19, 2004. The Alabama Judicial Inquiry Commission filed a complaint against Moore with the Alabama Court of the Judiciary a few days after the monument was removed from public display. Moore was subsequently removed from office on November 13, 2003 by the court. In 2012, Moore was returned to his position as Chief Justice by a vote of the people and began his second term in January 2013.

== See also ==
- Government of Alabama
