= Alabama Court of the Judiciary =

The Alabama Court of the Judiciary is a court within the judicial branch of the American state of Alabama. It has the power to try judicial officers in other state courts and punish them for violation of judicial ethics, misconduct, dereliction of duty, or incapacitation.

The Court is convoked to hear complaints of the state Judicial Inquiry Commission.

The Court is composed of the following:

- The Chief Judge of the Court, an appellate judge chosen by the Supreme Court from a court other than the Supreme Court.
- Two circuit judges and one district judge, chosen by the District Judges' Association.
- Two members of the Alabama State Bar and chosen by them.
- Three nonlegal professionals appointed by the Governor of Alabama with consent of the Alabama Senate.

Prior to 2005, the Lieutenant Governor of Alabama was able to pick one of the three nonlegal members.

Following the results of a trial, the judge(s) in question may, if they wish, appeal to the Supreme Court of Alabama.

== Relationship with impeachment ==
As is typical with most state legislatures, supreme court justices in Alabama can be impeached. However, Amendment 580 to the state constitution places the Court of the Judiciary at a higher priority than legislative action—e.g. a judge cannot be impeached while being tried by the Court, and should a prosecution in the Court fail, the legislature may not proffer an impeachment for the same reasons.

== Sources ==
- Alabama Judicial System Online - Court of the Judiciary
