= 2015 Montgomery mayoral election =

- August 25, 2015
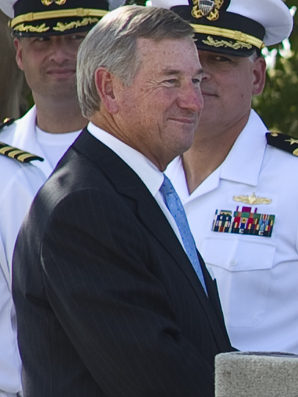

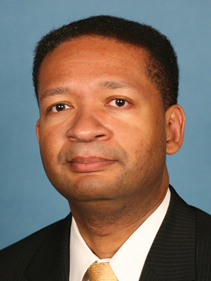

Candidate	Todd Strange	Artur Davis	Daniel Harris Jr.
Popular vote	22,744	11,010	4,508
Percentage	56.50%	27.35%	11.20%
Mayor before election
Todd Strange
Republican
Elected mayor
Todd Strange
Republican

The 2015 Montgomery mayoral election took place on August 25, 2015, to elect the Mayor of Montgomery, Alabama.

The election was officially nonpartisan, with all candidates that ran together, regardless of party. Had no candidate received a majority of the vote, a runoff election would have been held between the top two candidates.

Incumbent Republican Mayor Todd Strange won re-election to a second full term in office without a runoff on August 25, 2015.

== Candidates ==
=== Republican Party ===
==== Declared ====
- Artur Davis, former Democratic U.S. Representative and Democratic candidate for Governor of Alabama in 2010
- Todd Strange, incumbent mayor

=== Democratic Party ===
==== Declared ====
- Ella Bell, Alabama State Board of Education member
- Dan Harris, Montgomery County Commissioner

==== Declined to run ====
- Joe Hubbard, former state representative and nominee for attorney general in 2014
- Steven Reed, Montgomery County Probate Judge
- Quinton Ross, state senator

==== Results ====
Montgomery mayoral primary election, 2015
Party	Candidate	Votes	%
Nonpartisan	Todd Strange (incumbent)	22,744	56.50
Nonpartisan	Artur Davis	11,010	27.35
Nonpartisan	Daniel Harris Jr.	4,508	11.20
Nonpartisan	Ella B. Bell	1,645	4.09
Nonpartisan	Buena V. Browder	349	0.87
Nonpartisan	Under Votes	60	0.00
Nonpartisan	Over Votes	2	0.00
Total votes		40,318	100
