= 2019 Montgomery mayoral election =

- August 27, 2019 (first round); October 8, 2019 (second round)
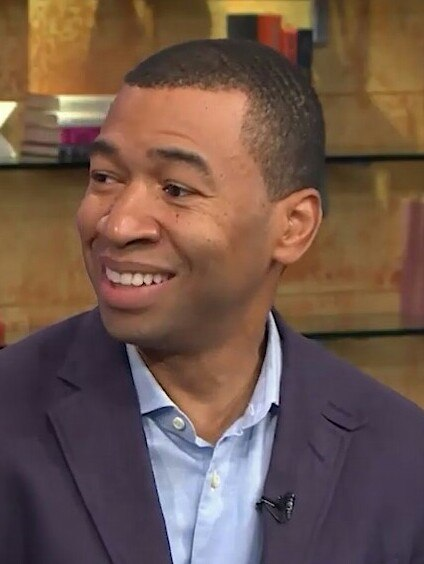

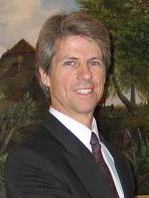
Candidate	Steven Reed	David Woods
Party	Nonpartisan	Nonpartisan
First round	18,571; 42.49%	10,272; 23.50%
Second round	32,918; 67.28%	16,010; 32.72%
Candidate	Ed Crowell	J. C. Love III
Party	Nonpartisan	Nonpartisan
First round	5,272; 12.06%	4,251; 9.73%
Mayor before election
Todd Strange
Republican
Elected mayor
Steven Reed
Democratic

The 2019 Montgomery mayoral election took place on August 27 and October 8, 2019, to elect the Mayor of Montgomery, Alabama.

Incumbent Republican Mayor Todd Strange, who had been elected to a partial term and two full terms as mayor, did not seek re-election to a fourth full term in office.

The election was officially nonpartisan.

With no candidate receiving a majority of the vote, a runoff election was held between the top two candidates. Two candidates, Montgomery County Probate Judge Steven Reed and businessman David Woods, made it to the October 8 runoff, with Reed winning the runoff.

Reed then became the city's first African-American mayor after being sworn in on November 12, 2019.

== Results ==
=== First round ===
First round results
Party	Candidate	Votes	%
Nonpartisan	Steven Reed	18,571	42.49
Nonpartisan	David Woods	10,272	23.50
Nonpartisan	Ed Crowell	5,272	12.06
Nonpartisan	J. C. Love III	4,251	9.73
Nonpartisan	Elton Norris Dean Sr.	1,835	4.20
Nonpartisan	Artur Davis	1,784	4.08
Nonpartisan	Victorrus Felder	879	2.01
Nonpartisan	Shannon Ferrari	289	0.64
Nonpartisan	Ronald L. Davis	186	0.43
Nonpartisan	Bibby Simmons	156	0.36
Nonpartisan	Butler Browder	127	0.29
Nonpartisan	Hobson Cox	92	0.21

=== Second round ===
Runoff results
Party	Candidate	Votes	%
Nonpartisan	Steven Reed	32,918	67.2
Nonpartisan	David Woods	16,010	32.7
