= 2014 Alabama gubernatorial election =

- November 4, 2014
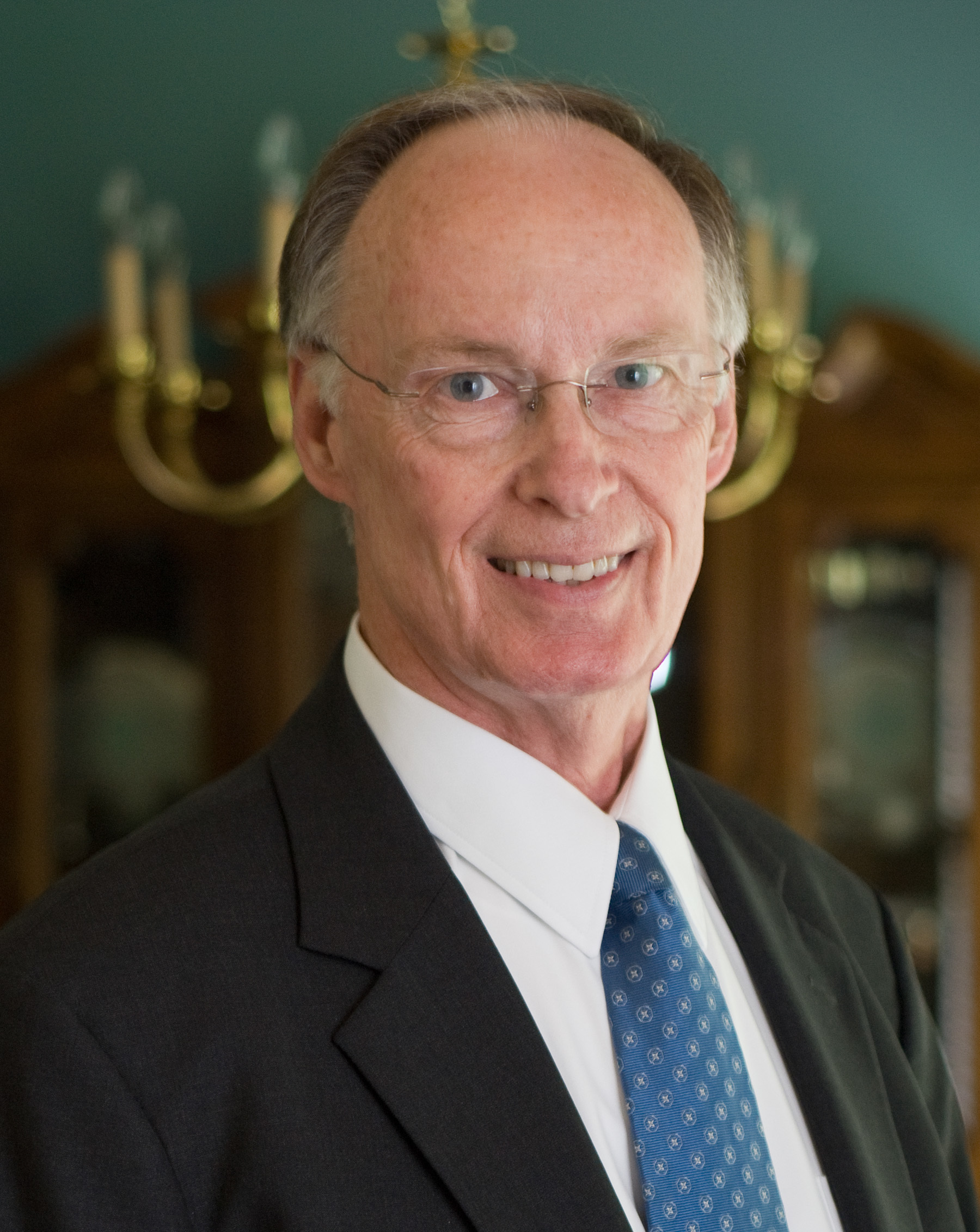

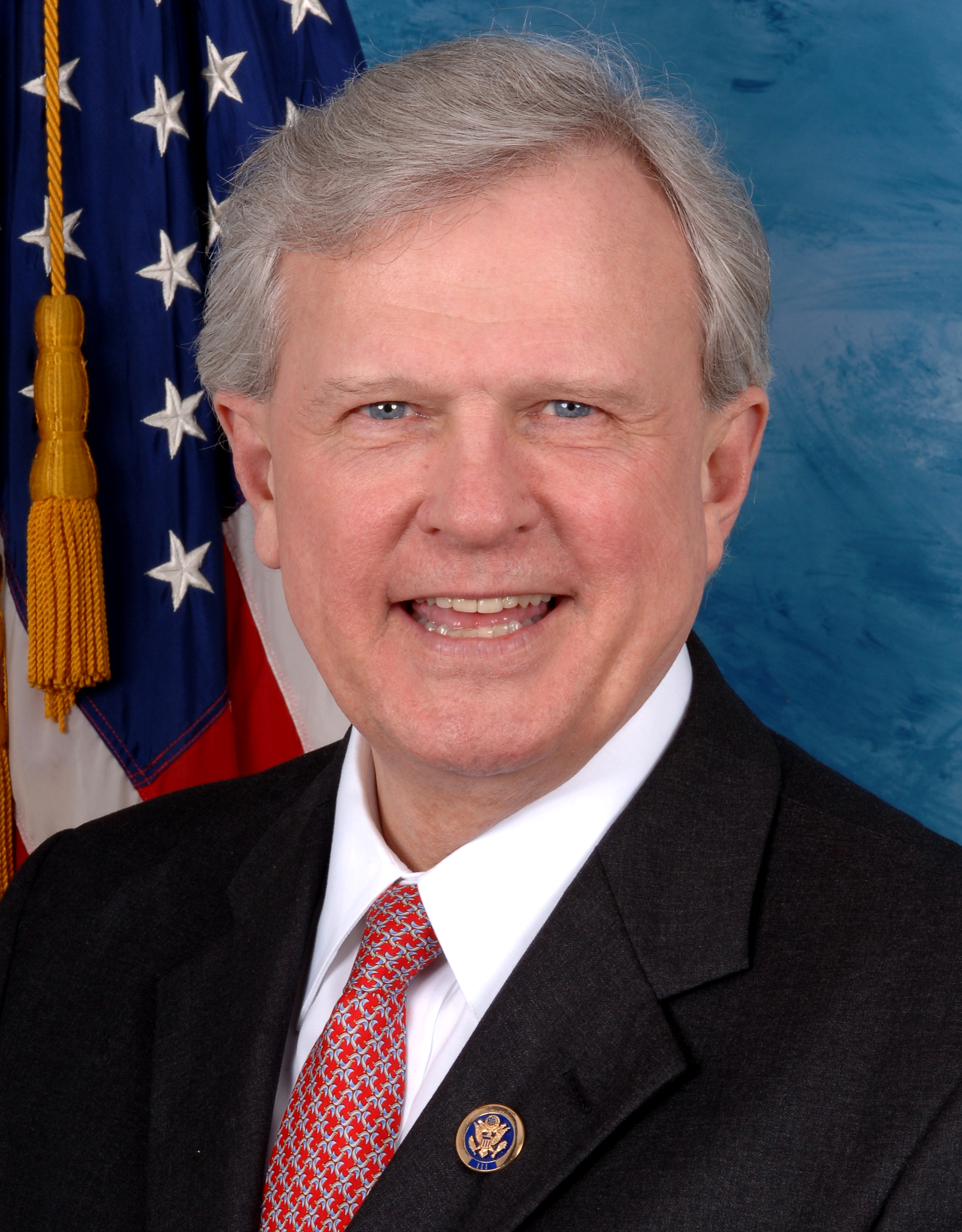
Nominee	Robert J. Bentley	Parker Griffith
Party	Republican	Democratic
Popular vote	750,231	427,787
Percentage	63.56%	36.24%
- Bentley: 50–60% 60–70% 70–80% 80–90% Griffith: 50–60% 60–70% 70–80% 80–90%
Governor before election
Robert J. Bentley
Republican
Elected Governor
Robert J. Bentley
Republican

The 2014 Alabama gubernatorial election took place on November 4, 2014, to elect the governor of Alabama. Incumbent Governor Robert J. Bentley won a second term over Democrat Parker Griffith. This was the first Alabama gubernatorial race where either Choctaw and/or Conecuh counties voted Republican. As of 2026, this is the last time Jefferson County voted Republican in any statewide election contested by a Democrat. Bentley did not complete this term; he resigned in April 2017 due to a scandal and was succeeded by fellow Republican Kay Ivey.

== Republican primary ==
=== Candidates ===
==== Declared ====
- Robert J. Bentley, incumbent governor
- Stacy Lee George, former Morgan County commissioner
- Bob Starkey, retired software company owner and candidate for mayor of Scottsboro in 2012

==== Declined ====
- Tommy Battle, mayor of Huntsville
- Bradley Byrne, U.S. representative and candidate for governor in 2010 (ran for re-election)
- David Carrington, president of the Jefferson County Commission (ran for re-election)
- Beth Chapman, former secretary of state of Alabama
- Mike Hubbard, speaker of the Alabama House of Representatives (ran for re-election)
- Mary Scott Hunter, member of the Alabama State Board of Education (ran for re-election)
- Kay Ivey, lieutenant governor of Alabama (ran for re-election)
- Tim James, businessman, son of former Governor Fob James, and candidate for governor in 2002 and 2010
- Del Marsh, president pro tempore of the Alabama Senate (ran for re-election)
- Roy Moore, chief justice of the Alabama Supreme Court and candidate for governor in 2006 and 2010
- Tony Petelos, Jefferson County manager and former mayor of Hoover
- Bob Riley, former governor of Alabama
- Luther Strange, attorney general of Alabama (ran for re-election)

=== Polling ===
Poll source	Date(s) administered	Sample size	Margin of error	Robert J. Bentley	Stacy Lee George	Bob Starkey	Undecided
Cygnal	May 29–30, 2014	1,217	± 2.81%	80.7%	5.1%	5.3%	8.9%
Cygnal	May 19–20, 2014	1,324	± 2.69%	73.3%	3.1%	1.8%	21.8%

Hypothetical polling

Poll source	Date(s) administered	Sample size	Margin of error	Robert J. Bentley	Bob Riley	Other/ Undecided
Capital Survey Research Center	May 21–23; June 4–6, 2012	315	± 5.5%	49.5%	27.6%	23.9%

=== Results ===
Republican primary results
Party	Candidate	Votes	%
Republican	Robert J. Bentley (incumbent)	388,247	89.35%
Republican	Stacy Lee George	25,134	5.78%
Republican	Bob Starkey	21,144	4.87%
Total votes		434,525	100.00%

== Democratic primary ==
=== Declared ===
- Kevin Bass, businessman, former professional baseball player and candidate for mayor of Fayette in 2012
- Parker Griffith, former U.S. representative, a former Republican while serving in Congress

=== Declined ===
- Billy Beasley, state senator
- Regina Benjamin, former surgeon general of the United States
- Sue Bell Cobb, former chief justice of the Alabama Supreme Court
- Vivian Davis Figures, minority leader of the Alabama Senate and nominee for the U.S. Senate in 2008
- Craig Ford, minority leader of the Alabama House of Representatives
- Pete Johnson, retired Jefferson County judge
- John Rogers, state representative
- Robert Vance, Jefferson County circuit judge and nominee for chief justice of the Alabama Supreme Court in 2012

=== Endorsements ===
Parker Griffith

Organizations

- Alabama Democratic Conference

=== Results ===
Primary results by county Griffith: 50–60%; 60–70%; 70–80%; Bass: 50–60%; 60–70%; 70–80%; Tie: 50%

Democratic primary results
Party	Candidate	Votes	%
Democratic	Parker Griffith	115,433	63.90%
Democratic	Kevin Bass	65,225	36.10%
Total votes		180,658	100.00%

== Independents ==
=== Candidates ===
==== Declined ====
- Charles Barkley, former NBA player

== General election ==
=== Endorsements ===
Robert J. Bentley (R)

Organizations

- Alabama Association of Realtors
- Alabama Farmers Federation
- Alabama Forestry Association
- Alabama Republican Assembly
- Alabama Retail Association
- Business Council of Alabama
- Conservative Christians of Alabama
- NRA Political Victory Fund
Parker Griffith (D)

Organizations

- Alabama Voter's Coalition
- International Brotherhood of Boilermakers

=== Predictions ===
Source	Ranking	As of
The Cook Political Report	Solid R	November 3, 2014
Sabato's Crystal Ball	Safe R	November 3, 2014
Rothenberg Political Report	Safe R	November 3, 2014
Real Clear Politics	Safe R	November 3, 2014

=== Polling ===
Poll source	Date(s) administered	Sample size	Margin of error	Robert Bentley (R)	Parker Griffith (D)	Other	Undecided
CBS News/NYT/YouGov	October 16–23, 2014	661	± 6%	63%	25%	0%	12%
CBS News/NYT/YouGov	September 20 – October 1, 2014	692	± 4%	65%	28%	1%	6%
CBS News/NYT/YouGov	August 18 – September 2, 2014	741	± 5%	62%	28%	1%	9%
CBS News/NYT/YouGov	July 5–24, 2014	1,036	± 5.2%	59%	31%	2%	9%
Rasmussen Reports	June 9–10, 2014	750	± 4%	55%	32%	4%	9%

=== Results ===
2014 Alabama gubernatorial election
Party	Candidate	Votes	%	±%
Republican	Robert J. Bentley (incumbent)	750,231	63.56%	+5.66%
Democratic	Parker Griffith	427,787	36.24%	−5.86%
Write-in		2,395	0.20%	N/A
Total votes		1,180,413	100.00%	N/A
Republican hold				

==== Counties that flipped from Democratic to Republican ====
- Butler (largest city: Greenville)
- Chambers (largest city: Valley)
- Choctaw (largest city: Butler)
- Conecuh (largest city: Evergreen)
- Coosa (largest city: Goodwater)
- Henry (largest city: Headland)
- Jefferson (largest city: Birmingham)

==== By congressional district ====
Bentley won six of seven congressional districts.

District	Bentley	Griffith	Representative
1st	66%	34%	Bradley Byrne
2nd	64%	35%	Martha Roby
3rd	64%	36%	Mike Rogers
4th	73%	27%	Robert Aderholt
5th	71%	28%	Mo Brooks
6th	76%	24%	Gary Palmer
7th	31%	69%	Terri Sewell
