= 2023 Montgomery mayoral election =

- August 22, 2023
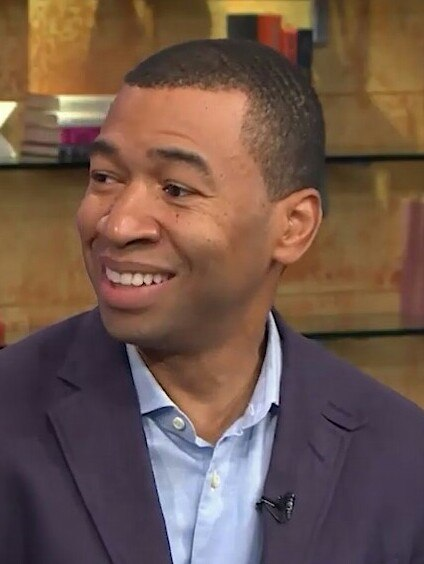

Candidate	Steven Reed	Barrett Gilbreath
Party	Nonpartisan	Nonpartisan
Popular vote	22,906	15,640
Percentage	56.9%	38.8%
Mayor before election
Steven Reed
Democratic
Elected mayor
Steven Reed
Democratic

The 2023 Montgomery mayoral election took place on August 22, 2023, to elect the Mayor of Montgomery, Alabama. Incumbent Democratic Mayor Steven Reed won re-election to a second term with 56.9% of the vote. The election was officially nonpartisan.

== Results ==
2023 Montgomery mayoral election results
Party	Candidate	Votes	%
Nonpartisan	Steven Reed	22,906	56.89
Nonpartisan	Barrett Gilbreath	15,640	38.84
Nonpartisan	Victorrus Felder	1,336	12.06
Nonpartisan	Marcus McNeal	384	0.95
Total votes		40,266	100.00

== See also ==
- List of mayors of Montgomery, Alabama
