= Tim James =

Tim James may refer to:

- Tim James (Australian politician), member of the New South Wales Parliament
- Tim James (basketball), basketball player
- Tim James (country music songwriter), country music songwriter (Toby Keith, Trace Adkins)
- Tim James (musician), singer, songwriter and record producer (Miley Cyrus, Aly & AJ, and Demi Lovato)
- Tim James (Alabama politician), Alabama businessman
