= Artur Davis =

American attorney and politician (born 1967)

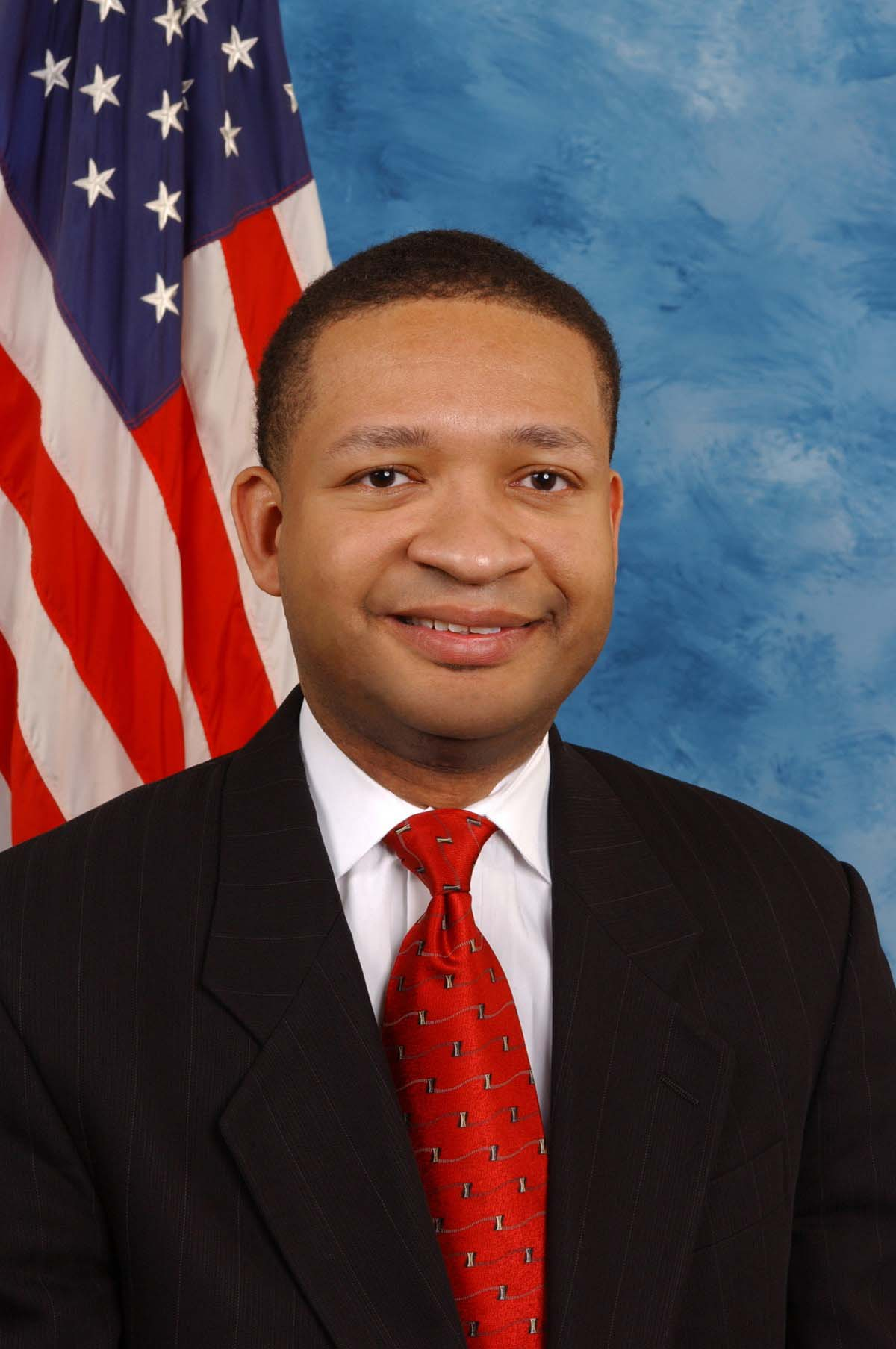

Member of the U.S. House of Representatives from Alabama's 7th district
- In office January 3, 2003 – January 3, 2011
- Preceded by: Earl Hilliard Sr.
- Succeeded by: Terri Sewell

Personal details
- Born: Artur Genestre Davis; October 9, 1967 (age 59) Montgomery, Alabama, U.S.
- Party: Democratic (before 2012, 2015–2016, 2017–present); Republican (2012–2015, 2016–2017)
- Spouse: Tara Johnson
- Education: Harvard University (BA, JD)

Artur Genestre Davis (/ɑːrˈtʊər/; born October 9, 1967) is an American attorney and former politician who served as a Democratic member of the United States House of Representatives for Alabama's 7th congressional district from 2003 to 2011. He was also a candidate for the Democratic nomination for Governor of Alabama in the 2010 election. After losing in the primary, he moved to Virginia and joined the Republican Party. He rejoined the Democratic Party in 2015, switched to the Republican Party again in 2016, and then back to the Democrats in 2017, in his two attempts to be elected Mayor of Montgomery, Alabama in the 2015 and 2019 elections, losing both times.

Davis was an early supporter of Barack Obama's 2008 bid for the presidency, and one of the national co-chairs for Obama's 2008 campaign. Known for his oratorical skills, Davis made one of the nominating speeches for Obama at the 2008 Democratic National Convention. While serving on the House Ways and Means Committee, Davis was the first African-American member of Congress to advocate that Committee Chairman Charles B. Rangel give up the chairmanship of the tax committee in the wake of ethics charges against Rangel. In 2009 and 2010, Davis voted against the Patient Protection and Affordable Care Act, the only member of the Congressional Black Caucus to do so.

In 2009, Davis sought to become Alabama's first African-American Governor. In attempting to appeal to a broader electorate, he lost the support of black voters by opposing national health care reform and failing to meet with certain black political groups. He lost in the Democratic primary to Agriculture Commissioner Ron Sparks, a more liberal Democrat. Shortly after, Davis announced he would not be running for re-election to the House in 2010, instead returning to the practice of law.

A 1990s honors graduate of Harvard University, in 2012 Davis became a visiting fellow at the Harvard Institute of Politics. He also began writing a column for the conservative National Review. He considered running for Congress as a Republican in the 2014 House elections in Virginia but did not do so. A resident of Virginia from 2011 until 2014, Davis spoke at the 2012 Republican National Convention in support of the Republican nominee for President, Mitt Romney. He was defeated in his two attempts to be elected Mayor of Montgomery, Alabama in the 2015 and 2019 mayoral elections.

== Early life, education, and early career ==
Davis was born in Montgomery, Alabama, on October 9, 1967, and was raised by his mother and grandmother. He graduated from Jefferson Davis High School and then magna cum laude from Harvard University in 1990. He earned a J.D. cum laude from Harvard Law School before returning to Alabama. He was the recipient of the Best Oralist Award in the Ames Moot Court Competition at Harvard Law School.

After working as an intern at the Southern Poverty Law Center and then as a civil rights lawyer, he served as an Assistant United States Attorney.

== U.S. House of Representatives ==
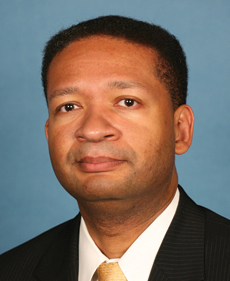
Davis during the 111th Congress

=== Elections ===
2000

Davis ran for the House in the Democratic primary against 10-year incumbent and former civil rights activist Earl F. Hilliard. He criticized Hilliard for taking a trip to Libya in 1997 despite U.S. sanctions. Davis lost the 2000 primary election 58–34%.

2002

Davis ran again in 2002. The race attracted national attention because both candidates made the Israeli–Palestinian conflict an issue, and both attracted support and money from outside of Alabama—Davis from Jewish Americans and supporters of Israel, Hilliard from Arab-Americans and supporters of the Palestinians. During the campaign, Hilliard questioned whether Davis was "black enough" to represent the district. Davis narrowly won the primary requiring a runoff in June. He won the runoff easily, assuring him victory in November in the heavily Democratic district, and he began his term in January 2003.

2004

Davis was challenged in the 2004 primary by Albert Turner Jr., a son of a leader of Selma's "Bloody Sunday" march. Davis won the primary 88%–12%.

2006

In the Democratic primary, he defeated political newcomer Eddison Walters 90–9%. He won the general election unopposed.

2008

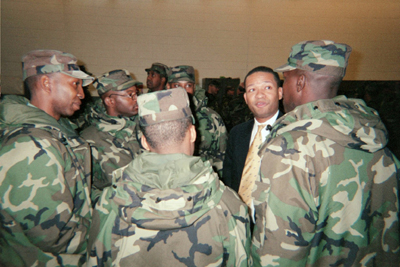
Rep Davis meeting Alabama troops preparing to leave for Iraq war, 2003 (US House photo)

In the new Democratically controlled 110th Congress, Davis was assigned to the Committee on Ways and Means. The stature of that appointment, and the difficulty of raising sufficient funds, led Davis to postpone plans to challenge conservative Senator Jeff Sessions in 2008. In January 2007, Davis said that he was still interested in running on a statewide ticket in 2010, either for Governor, or for Senate if Richard Shelby elected to retire.

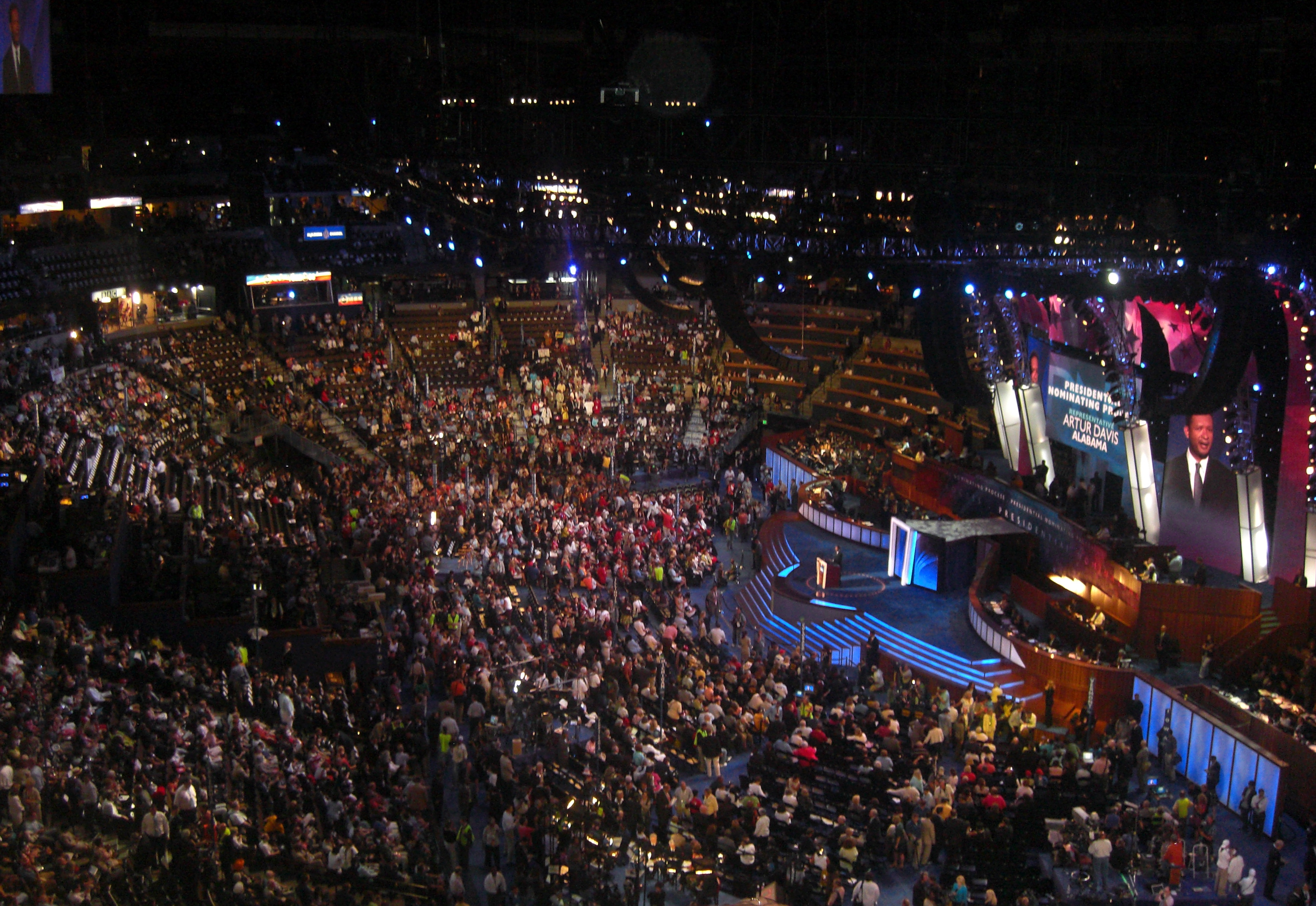
Davis delivers a seconding speech formally placing Barack Obama's name in nomination during the third day of the 2008 Democratic National Convention in Denver, Colorado.

In 2007 he became the first Congressman outside Illinois to endorse Senator Barack Obama for president in 2008. At the 2008 Democratic National Convention, Davis gave a seconding speech formally placing Obama's name in nomination. Davis also served as one of Obama's national campaign co-chairs.

Davis's name surfaced in media speculation as a potential Attorney General in Obama's cabinet. However, Davis was quoted in The Birmingham News as stating that he did not anticipate such an offer, and would refuse it if made.

=== Tenure ===
As a freshman in Congress, Davis led the successful fight to reverse funding cuts for minority land grant colleges including Tuskegee University. As a second term member, Davis won a floor fight to restore funding to the HOPE VI program for renovating public housing; he persuaded over sixty Republicans to vote with Democrats. In 2005, Davis was the lead Democratic sponsor of a bill establishing a national cord blood bank which will widen the availability of blood transfusions for thousands of patients who suffer from diseases such as sickle cell anemia and diabetes. He received an A− grade on his voting record relating to veteran issues from Iraq and Afghanistan Veterans of America.

Davis was appointed to the Senior Whip Team for the Democratic Caucus of the 109th Congress and was the co-chair of the centrist House New Democrat Coalition, as well as the Southern Regional co-chair for the Democratic Congressional Campaign Committee.

Davis was the first member of the Congressional Black Caucus to demand that former House Ways and Means Chair Charlie Rangel surrender his gavel in the wake of an ongoing ethics investigation.

Davis twice voted against the Democratic-supported health care reform legislation, first in November 2009, and again in March 2010 when the legislation passed and was signed into law by President Obama. He was the only member of the Congressional Black Caucus to vote against the legislation in March 2010; he was also the member from the most-heavily Democratic-leaning district to vote against the legislation.

In April 2009, Davis voted against the Matthew Shepard and James Byrd, Jr. Hate Crimes Prevention Act.

=== Committee assignments ===
In Congress, Davis was a member of the House Committee on the Budget, Committee on Ways and Means, the Committee on the Judiciary and several of their subcommittees. He was a member of the 30 Something Working Group and the Congressional Black Caucus.

== 2010 gubernatorial election ==
On February 6, 2009, Davis announced his candidacy for Governor of Alabama in 2010. His opponent in the Democratic primary was state Agriculture Commissioner Ron Sparks.

During the primary campaign, Davis downplayed matters of race and emphasized his independence from Democratic party orthodoxy. He caused controversy, including within his heavily minority congressional district, by voting against President Barack Obama's new health-care law—the only black Democrat in Congress to do so. He also refused to sit for the endorsement screenings of Alabama's black political groups, drawing criticism that he was snubbing African Americans in order to court white votes. Davis lost the Democratic primary to Sparks on June 1, 2010, ending his gubernatorial bid. Birmingham News columnist John Archibald questioned Davis' strategy, saying that he campaigned "as it if were a general election and he wanted to claim some conservative street cred." Archibald believed that this hurt him with Democratic primary voters in Alabama, who are "blue dots in this big red state," and resulted in him becoming "the first African-American candidate in a statewide Alabama race to lose the black vote." After the primary, state Representative Roderick Scott said black Democrats “can no longer take for granted they will receive the African-American vote.” Davis announced he was retiring from politics and would return to private practice at the conclusion of his term in Congress in 2011. Davis was succeeded by Democrat Terri Sewell, the first African-American woman elected to the United States House of Representatives from Alabama.

== Post-congressional career ==
For a time, Davis was doubtful he would run for public office again. He said, "Alabama is not friendly to independent candidacies” and suggested that running as a Republican would not be a viable option because the Alabama Republican Party had declined to embrace politicians who have switched parties such as former U.S. Congressman Parker Griffith who switched parties and lost the Republican primary in 2010. He changed his voter registration from Alabama to Virginia in 2012, and said he would run as a Republican were he to seek political office in the future.

In the Spring of 2012, he announced he would become a visiting fellow at the Harvard Institute of Politics. In 2012, the conservative National Review online started publishing some of his political commentary. In February 2012, Davis told Politico that some Democrats wanted to argue that Obama's critics were motivated by racism, which Davis called "a huge mistake ... a tactic that's likely to backfire" as it would lead "substantial number of Americans" to believe they were being called racists because they did not support Obama.

In August 2012, he cited remarks by Vice President Joe Biden for "racial viciousness" for remarks Davis said were insulting to African Americans, and said, "Governor Romney is absolutely right as the Obama campaign is running a divisive campaign … pitting one set of Americans against another issue after issue". Davis also said, "It wouldn't be so bad if Barack Obama had not campaigned in such a different way." Davis spoke at the Republican National Convention in August 2012 to voice additional criticisms of Barack Obama. Following Mitt Romney's loss in the 2012 presidential election, Davis said: "The Republican conservative base seems perilously close to shrinking to white southern evangelicals, senior white males, and upper income Protestants."

In December 2013, it was announced that Davis would not run for retiring Republican Congressman Frank Wolf's seat in Virginia. Davis had previously expressed interest in running for Wolf's seat after his move to the state.

In late June 2014, it was reported that Davis was considering running for Mayor of Montgomery, Alabama, in 2015. On July 18, 2014, Davis announced that he would launch an exploratory campaign for a mayoral run. On January 22, 2015, he officially declared his candidacy as a Democrat. On August 25, 2015, Artur Davis was defeated in the mayoral election by incumbent mayor Todd Strange. Following this loss, Davis expressed interest in running for the Montgomery County Commission in 2016 as a Democrat. However, the Alabama Democratic Party refused to allow Davis on the ballot, as he had supported a Republican candidate for office within the past four years.

Davis was also a candidate for Mayor of Montgomery in the August 2019 mayoral election, but lost again, winning 1,784 votes and placing sixth of twelve candidates.

== Electoral history ==
Alabama's 7th Congressional District House Election, 2002
Party	Candidate	Votes	%	±%
Democratic	Artur Davis	153,735	92.44%	
Libertarian	Lauren Orth McCay	12,100	7.28%	

Alabama's 7th Congressional District House Election, 2004
Party	Candidate	Votes	%	±%
Democratic	Artur Davis	183,408	74.97%	−17.47%
Republican	Steve Cameron	61,019	24.94%	+24.94%

Alabama's 7th Congressional District House Election, 2006
Party	Candidate	Votes	%	±%
Democratic	Artur Davis	133,870	99.04%	+24.07%

Alabama's 7th Congressional District House Election, 2008
Party	Candidate	Votes	%	±%
Democratic	Artur Davis	228,518	98.63%	−0.41%

Alabama's Democratic Gubernatorial Primary, 2010
Party	Candidate	Votes	%	±%
Democratic	Ron Sparks	199,558	62.44%	
Democratic	Artur Davis	120,050	37.56%	

Montgomery mayoral election, 2015
Party	Candidate	Votes	%
Republican	Todd Strange	22,744	56.50
Democratic	Artur Davis	11,010	27.35
Democratic	Dan Harris	4,508	11.20
Democratic	Ella Bell	1,645	4.09
Democratic	Buena Browder	349	0.87
Total votes		40,256	100

== See also ==
- List of African-American United States representatives

U.S. House of Representatives
Preceded by Earl Hilliard	Member of the U.S. House of Representatives from Alabama's 7th congressional district 2003–2011	Succeeded by Terri Sewell
Party political offices
Preceded by Jim Davis; Ron Kind; Adam Smith	Chair of the New Democrat Coalition; 2005–2007; Served alongside: Ron Kind and Ellen Tauscher	Succeeded by Ellen Tauscher
U.S. order of precedence (ceremonial)
Preceded by Glen Browder as Former U.S. Representative	Order of precedence of the United States as Former U.S. Representative	Succeeded by David F. Emery as Former U.S. Representative
