= W. A. Gayle Planetarium =

Planetarium in Montgomery, Alabama

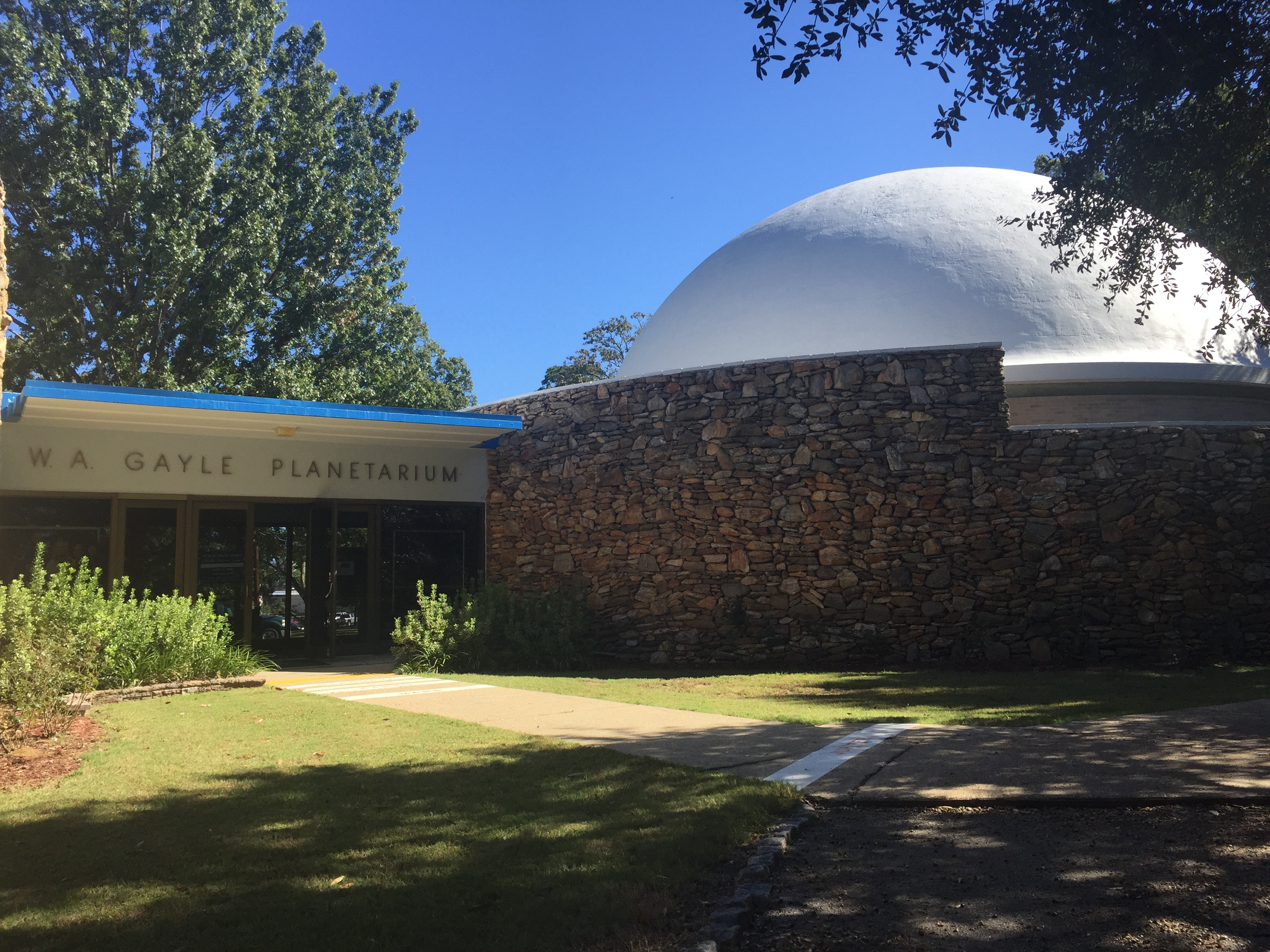
- Front of museum with dome
- Established: 25 September 1968
- Location: 1010 Forest Avenue; Montgomery, Alabama
- Coordinates: 32.368149°N 86.287416°W
- Key holdings: 159-seat planetarium
- Owner: Montgomery Zoo
- Website: Official website

The W.A. Gayle Planetarium is operated by the Montgomery Zoo for the city of Montgomery, Alabama. It provides public presentations and exhibits on astronomy, planetary science, and space exploration.

== Overview ==
The W.A. Gayle Planetarium is a planetarium located in Oak Park in the city of Montgomery, Alabama. Dedicated on September 25, 1968, the planetarium is named after William Armistead Gayle, mayor of Montgomery from 1952 to 1959. It was previously operated by Troy University for the City of Montgomery from 1972 to 2022.

The planetarium reopened to the public at the end of January 2024 after a shutdown during COVID-19 and a transfer of management responsibilities from Troy University back to the City of Montgomery. As of June 2024, public shows are offered on each Saturday with shows at 10 am, 11:30 am, 1 pm, and 2:30 pm. Tickets can be purchased at the planetarium gift shop on Saturdays 15-20 minutes before the start of each show. Group reservations (10 or more people) can be obtained by contacting the planetarium office directly and are provided by appointment Tuesdays - Fridays. The planetarium is closed on Sundays and Mondays.

Public and group shows typically offer visitors a full-dome movie about a current topic in astronomy and planetary science. Interactive presentations also provide a tour of the night sky over Montgomery, pointing out what planets, stars, and constellations can be seen overhead. A short laser show is usually provided at the end of the presentation as well. The 159-seat theater uses a Super MediaGlobe II digital projection system (installed in 2014) to simulate the night sky. Other exhibits include a one-fifth scale model of the Hubble Space Telescope, images of celestial objects, and a black-light hallway depicting the history of astronomy.
