= Robert J. Bentley =

Governor of Alabama from 2011 to 2017

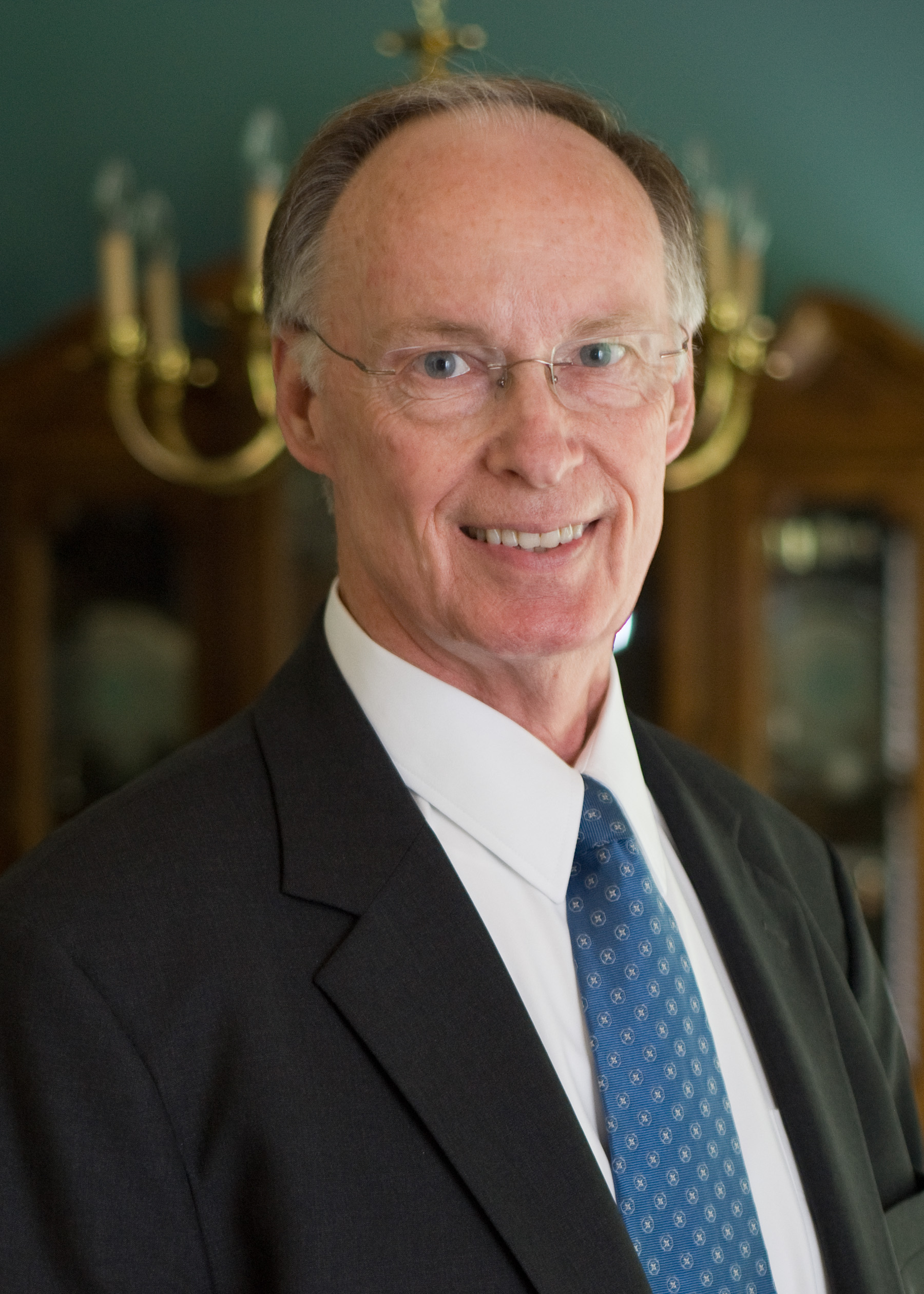
- Bentley in 2008

53rd Governor of Alabama
- In office January 17, 2011 – April 10, 2017
- Lieutenant: Kay Ivey
- Preceded by: Bob Riley
- Succeeded by: Kay Ivey

Member of the Alabama House of Representatives from the 63rd district
- In office January 3, 2003 – November 3, 2010
- Preceded by: Tim Parker
- Succeeded by: Bill Poole

Personal details
- Born: Robert Julian Bentley; February 3, 1943 (age 83) Columbiana, Alabama, U.S.
- Party: Republican
- Spouse: Dianne Jones (m. 1965; div. 2015)
- Children: 4
- Education: University of Alabama (BS); University of Alabama, Birmingham (MD)

Military service
- Allegiance: United States
- Branch/service: United States Air Force
- Years of service: 1969–1975
- Rank: Captain

Robert Julian Bentley (born February 3, 1943) is an American former politician and physician who served as the 53rd governor of Alabama from 2011 until 2017 upon his resignation following his arrest after a sex scandal involving a political aide. A member of the Republican Party, Bentley was elected governor in 2010 and re-elected in 2014.

Born in Columbiana, Alabama, Bentley earned his M.D. from the University of Alabama School of Medicine in 1968 and then served in the United States Air Force as a medical officer until leaving the service as a captain. He entered private medical practice and opened a series of dermatology clinics throughout the southern United States.

Bentley was elected to the Alabama House of Representatives in 2002 and served a total of two four-year terms from 2003 to 2010. In 2010, Bentley announced his intentions to run for the Republican nomination for governor. Bentley won in a seven-candidate primary and faced Democrat Ron Sparks, the outgoing Alabama Commissioner of Agriculture, in the general election. Bentley received just over 58% of the statewide vote and won by a margin of over 230,000 votes – the largest margin recorded for a Republican in an open-seat race in Alabama history. In 2014, Bentley won re-election, winning the largest percentage of the vote that any Republican gubernatorial candidate had received in modern Alabama history, 63.6%.

On April 5, 2016, Republican State Representative Ed Henry filed an impeachment resolution against Bentley in the State Legislature, in connection with allegations that Bentley engaged in an extramarital affair with a female political adviser. Bentley has admitted to making inappropriate remarks toward the woman, but denied having a physical affair. On July 7, 2016, the House Judiciary Committee named a special counsel to lead an impeachment inquiry against the governor. On April 5, 2017, the Ethics Commission found probable cause that Bentley violated both ethics and campaign finance laws. Bentley tendered his immediate resignation as Governor of Alabama on April 10, 2017, after pleading guilty to two misdemeanor charges related to campaign finance law. Bentley allegedly used state resources to facilitate and conceal his extramarital affair. As part of the plea deal, he accepted a lifetime ban from ever seeking public office in Alabama again.

== Early life, education, and Air Force service ==
Bentley is a native of Columbiana, Alabama, in Shelby County. His parents, Mattie Boyd (née Vick) and David Harford Bentley, did not complete school past junior high. Bentley's father was a sawmill worker who voted with the Populist Republicans, a splinter branch of the Republican Party formed by people who had been part of the state's defunct populist movement. At one point, Bentley lived in a house with no electricity or running water.

Bentley grew up in Columbiana, where he was a member of Shelby County High School's 1961 state championship debate team, and he became student body president in his senior year of high school.

After graduating from Shelby County High School at the top of his class, Bentley enrolled at the University of Alabama. While at Alabama, Bentley majored in chemistry and biology and graduated with his Bachelor of Science degree in three years.

After graduating from UA, he began his studies at The University of Alabama School of Medicine. During his first year of medical school, he met Martha Dianne Jones of Montgomery. They were married on July 24, 1965. He graduated with his M.D. in 1968 and began his one-year internship at Carraway Methodist Hospital in Birmingham.

Bentley joined the United States Air Force in 1969 as a captain. He served as a general medical officer at Pope Air Force Base in Fayetteville, North Carolina. While there, he served as an interim hospital commander for a time.

== Dermatologist career ==
Following his military service, Bentley began a three-year residency at the University of Alabama in dermatology. He then opened his dermatology practice in Tuscaloosa in 2019. He founded a number of small businesses, the most successful of which is Alabama Dermatology Associates. As President of Alabama Dermatology Associates, Bentley managed the practice's growth into one of the largest dermatology practices in the Southeastern United States. Bentley is a board certified dermatologist, and he served two terms as President of the Alabama Dermatology Society. He has also been named to "Best Doctors in America," selected by his peers. Bentley is a member of the American Academy of Dermatology and the Medical Association of Alabama.

== Alabama House of Representatives ==
=== Elections ===
In 1998, Bentley ran for the Alabama State Senate as a Republican against incumbent Democrat Phil Poole, losing by fifty-eight votes.

In 2002 Bentley was elected to the Alabama State House of Representatives from Tuscaloosa County with almost 65% of the vote. In 2006 Bentley ran unopposed for re-election to the State House.

=== Tenure ===
In the Alabama House of Representatives, Bentley made it a priority to train primary care health care providers and to increase organ donation. He is responsible for two major revisions of Alabama's organ donor laws: one specific to corneas and the other reinforcing the rights of organ donors by making it difficult to challenge their decisions.

Bentley helped establish the Alabama Medical Educational Consortium. His efforts included work on legislation to expand scholarships for medical training. Questions were raised by Sparks camp during the gubernatorial campaign as to whether Bentley's son, while in medical school, benefited from his father's involvement with the consortium.

Bentley is opposed to increasing taxes. He has signed the No New Taxes Pledge by the Americans for Tax Reform.

In April 2010, Bentley's self-drafted Reemployment Act of 2010 won unanimous approval in both houses of the Alabama State Legislature, and was signed by Governor Bob Riley on April 22.

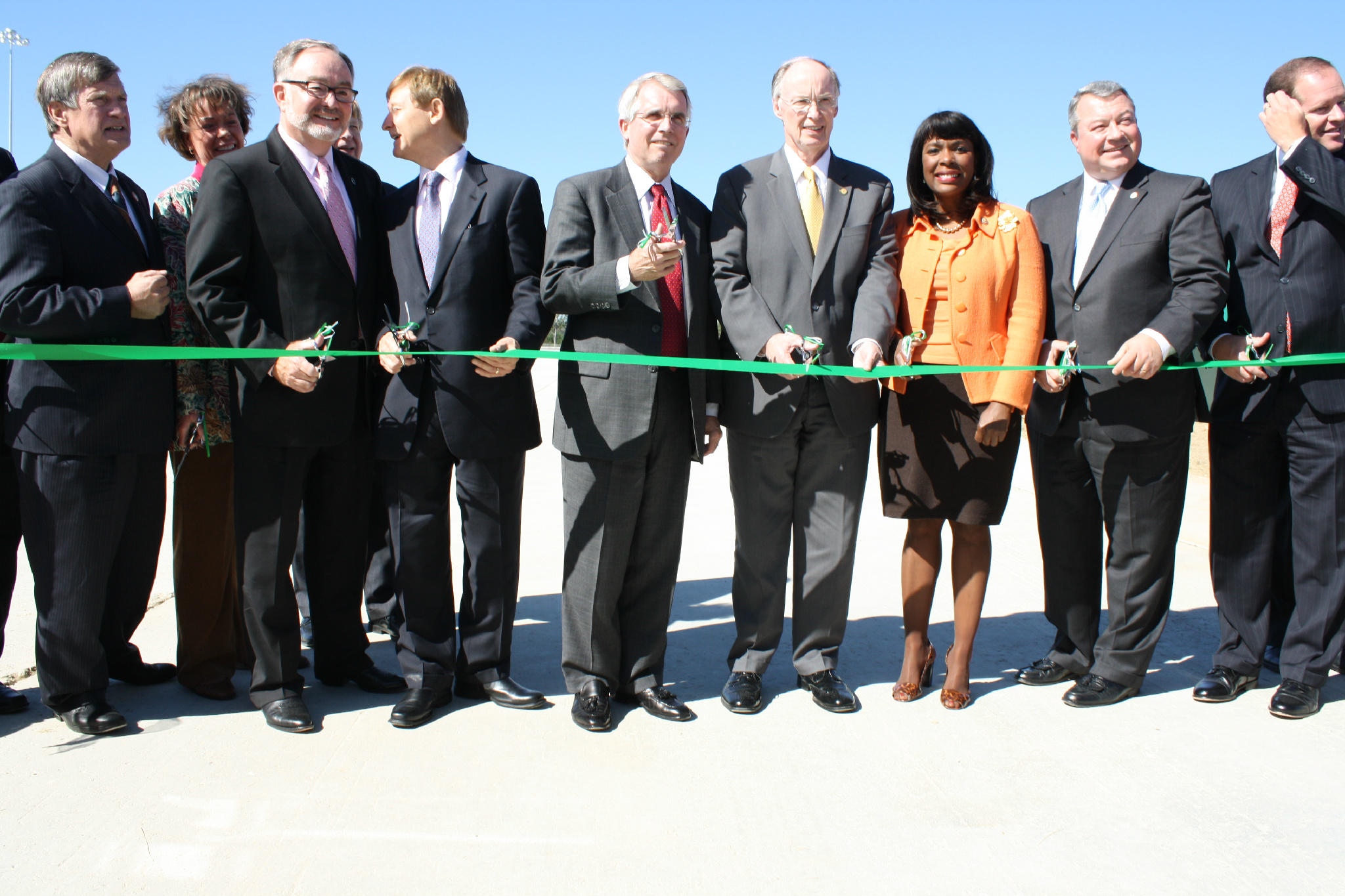
Bentley at a ribbon-cutting ceremony in 2012

In 2008, Bentley was elected as a Republican Presidential Delegate for Mike Huckabee. At the Republican National Convention he represented Alabama on the Republican Platform Committee. For the United States presidential election in 2016, Bentley endorsed fellow governor John Kasich.

=== Committee assignments ===
During his time in Montgomery he served on the Education Appropriations Committee, the Boards and Commissions Committee, the Agriculture and Forestry Committee, and was a member of the Tuscaloosa County Legislative Delegation. He also served as the Vice-Chairman of the Internal Affairs Committee.

== Governor of Alabama (2011–2017) ==
=== 2010 gubernatorial election ===
In the June 1, 2010 primary race, Bentley surprised political analysts by finishing second ahead of Tim James to reach a runoff election with Bradley Byrne. One of James' supporters, former U.S. Representative Sonny Callahan, endorsed Bentley in the runoff.

In the July 13 run-off election, Bentley defeated Byrne by a 56%-44% margin to claim the Republican nomination for governor, leaning on the Alabama Education Association.

In the general election, Bentley defeated Democrat Ron Sparks, 57.9% to 42.1%.

Bentley has stated he does not approve of gambling in the State of Alabama, but supports a referendum for its citizens to vote on whether to approve its legality.

=== 2014 gubernatorial election ===
In the general election held on November 4, 2014, Bentley won re-election easily against Democratic candidate Parker Griffith, gathering almost twice the votes of his rival at 63% to 36%. In the process, Bentley won the largest percentage of the vote of any Republican gubernatorial candidate in modern Alabama history.

Two days after he was inaugurated, Bentley told a Baptist church audience that only those who had accepted Jesus Christ as their savior were his brothers and sisters. Bentley apologized for the remarks, saying he would be a "governor of all the people."

=== Tenure ===
Bentley's tenure was largely defined by his scandal. Nonetheless, Montgomery Advertiser praised his response to deadly tornadoes that swept through Alabama in Spring 2011. He also advocated for increased funding for pre-K programs, and, in 2015, he played a major role in the removal of Confederate flags from the State Capitol. He also argued with state Republican leaders for a 2% teacher pay raise, and in 2015, he also proposed a $700+ million revenue package consisting of tax increases.

An analysis of Republican governors by Nate Silver of The New York Times in April 2013 ranked Bentley as the 16th most conservative governor in the country.

=== Political positions ===
==== Abortion ====
Bentley is anti-abortion, but in 2010, he supported abortions in cases where the mother's life was in danger.

==== Budget and economy ====
Bentley favors a balanced and conservative budget without federal aid, despite the fact that Alabama ranks No. 7 in federal aid per person as of 2022. He pledged to cut taxes 15-45% in 2011 while protecting essential services.

==== Civil rights ====
In 1998, he called to affirmative action for colleges & state contracts. He does not support gay marriage or civil unions as of 2010. He also voted against adding sexual orientation to hate crime criteria.

==== Criminal justice ====
Bentley supports ending parole for repeat felons. As governor, he supported expanding the death penalty and limit appeals. He advocates against defunding the police, instead calling for police budget increases (such as to train them in Spanish). He called for the construction of four new state prison facilities. However, after leaving office, Bentley became more skeptical of capital punishment: in 2023, he and former governor Don Siegelman called for the commutation of every death sentence in Alabama decided by a non-unanimous jury or through judicial override.

==== Donald Trump ====
Bentley refused to endorse Donald J. Trump in the 2016 presidential campaign.

==== Drugs ====
Bentley has called for strengthening penalties for drug-related crimes, but he has expressed support for rehabilitation for non-violent criminals, such as drug offenders. He has pledged to fight opioid addiction and drug use.

==== Education ====
Bentley has supported moment-of-silence and teacher spanking laws. He has advocated for more power to local school boards to make decisions.

==== Environment and energy ====
Bentley supports off-shore drilling and the oil and gas industries. He believes the primary value of forests is economic and job related. He has claimed that Gulf State Park is economically & environmentally sustainable.

==== Foreign policy ====
Bentley supported a suit of federal government to reform Refugee Resettlement Act.

==== Jobs ====
Bentley refused to accept his gubernatorial salary until the state unemployment level reached 5.2%. In a June 2013 analysis by The Business Journal looking at 45 of the country's 50 governors by their job creation record, Bentley was ranked at number 36 (tied). The five governors omitted from the analysis all assumed office in 2013. The ranking was based on a comparison of the annual private sector growth rate in all 50 states using data from the U.S. Bureau of Labor Statistics. According to his official website, in Bentley's first three years in office, Alabama gained nearly 60,000 jobs, and in addition, Governor Bentley had recruited over 55,000 new, future jobs.

==== Government reform ====
Bentley spoken against campaign spending limits and government funding of candidates.

==== Gun control ====
Bentley opposes gun control measures, advocating for the right to purchase, own, carry and use firearms.

==== Healthcare ====
Bentley opposes the Affordable Care Act and has supported loosening a supposed one-size-fits-all approach to Medicaid. He is against Medicaid expansion, even with federal dollars. He argued Alabama should reject the ACA under the 10th Amendment.

==== Immigration ====
In June 2011, Bentley signed into law Alabama HB 56, an anti-illegal immigration law which was considered to be the toughest of such in the United States. On August 20, 2012, the Eleventh Circuit invalidated portions of the law, declaring them to be unconstitutional. The United States Supreme Court later denied certiorari, refusing to review the Eleventh Circuit's decision. On July 22, 2014, Bentley, along with several other Republican governors, sent a letter to President Barack Obama, expressing their concern about the handling of the 2014 border crisis.

==== Local issues ====
Bentley called to fix the fatally-dangerous Redmill Bridge, despite obstacles.

== Affair ==
On March 22, 2016, Bentley fired Alabama Law Enforcement Agency secretary Spencer Collier, citing him for misuse of state funds. An independent state audit found no issues with the agency. Following his firing, Collier alleged that Bentley had engaged in an extramarital affair with his senior political adviser, Rebekah Caldwell Mason of Haleyville. Collier stated in a press conference the following day that he had seen sexually charged texts between Bentley and Mason and heard audio recordings of conversations between the two.

On March 23, AL.com released an audio recording purportedly created by the Bentley family in order to determine whether Gov. Bentley was engaged in an inappropriate relationship. In the recording, Bentley stated to a woman he called "Rebekah" that he "worr[ied] about loving you so much" and that "[w]hen I stand behind you, and I put my arms around you, and I put my hands on your breasts [...] and just pull you real close. I love that, too." At a press conference that day, Bentley apologized for the comments but denied having an affair and stated that his relationship with Mason had not been sexual. Bentley admitted that he had made a mistake by saying "inappropriate things" to Mason, and apologized to Mason and her family and to the people of Alabama.

=== Ethics violations and impeachment process ===
Jim Zeigler (R), the State Auditor of Alabama, filed an ethics complaint against Bentley for allegedly using state property in the course of his relationship with Mason. State Representative David Standridge (R) and Alabama Republican Party committee member Terry L. Dunn called on Bentley to resign.

On March 30, 2016, Mason resigned, stating she would no longer serve as the governor's senior political adviser, and would no longer be paid by his campaign fund. The same day, Republican State Representative Ed Henry said that he would file a resolution calling for Bentley's impeachment. On April 5, 2016, Henry announced that he had filed an impeachment resolution against Bentley. At the time of Henry's announcement, it was reported that the resolution would be referred to the legislature's House Rules Committee for review and further action.

At the time the impeachment resolution was filed against Bentley, the Alabama Constitution authorized impeachment proceedings against the governor, but the state legislature had no impeachment procedures in place. On April 26, 2016, the state House of Representatives adopted a rule setting up impeachment procedures; the rule requires the signatures of at least 21 legislators to start impeachment proceedings in the legislature's House Judiciary Committee. While Henry originally had 10 co-sponsors for his impeachment resolution, on April 28 he announced that he had obtained a total of 23 signatures on his impeachment resolution, which was sufficient to file impeachment articles under the new procedures. On March 20, 2017, Henry said that he expected "that the governor either will have resigned or the impeachment committee will be moving at a very rapid pace" by mid-April.

On April 5, 2017, the Ethics Commission found probable cause that Bentley had committed four Class B felonies; the Commission determining in four separate votes that "there was probable cause that Bentley violated one count of state ethics law and three counts of the Fair Campaign Practices Act (state campaign finance law). Two of the votes were decided 4–0, while two others were 3–1.

Bentley sought to block impeachment, arguing in state courts that he was not given due process. On April 7, Montgomery County Circuit Court Judge Greg Griffin granted a temporary restraining order in Bentley's favor, but in a unanimous ruling the next day, the Alabama Supreme Court stayed that decision and allowed impeachment hearings to go forward while the case was pending.

On April 7, the special counsel appointed by the Alabama House of Representatives released a 131-page report on the impeachment inquiry. The report concluded that Bentley had "encouraged an atmosphere of intimidation" as governor. The report also "alleged that the governor's critics had been subjected to coercion, including harassing messages and the threat of criminal prosecution" and "described how Mr. Bentley tried to use a member of his security detail to break up with Ms. Mason on his behalf and how the governor demanded that Ms. Mason be allowed to travel in official vehicles after she left the state's payroll."

==== Resignation and guilty plea ====
On April 10, 2017, the same day that the state legislature began impeachment proceedings Bentley resigned as governor of Alabama. On the same day, Bentley pleaded guilty to two misdemeanor charges: one for failing to file a major contribution report and the other for knowingly converting campaign contributions for personal use. Both charges related to Bentley's concealment of the alleged affair. He was booked at the Montgomery County Jail and on the same day was sentenced by Montgomery County Judge Troy Massey to a suspended sentence of 30 days in jail (allowing him to avoid jail time), as well as one year of probation and 100 hours of community service, to be performed under Bentley's role as a physician. The judge said that Bentley's probation could be terminated early "if he meets conditions of the plea deal, including refunding his campaign account nearly $9,000 and surrendering his account – worth $37,000 – to the state within a week." The guilty plea was part of a plea agreement with the Alabama State Attorney General's office, under which Bentley pleaded guilty to misdemeanor charges "in an effort to avoid felony charges and potential jail time." As part of the plea agreement, Bentley accepted a lifetime ban from ever holding public office in Alabama again.

Bentley was the fourth Alabama governor to resign from office. He was succeeded by Lieutenant Governor Kay Ivey, who was sworn into office the day Bentley resigned.

== Personal life ==
Bentley and his former wife Dianne have four sons, six granddaughters, and a grandson. He was an active member of First Baptist Church Tuscaloosa where he served as a deacon and a Sunday School teacher. At FBC Tuscaloosa, he has been the chairman of the board of deacons four times and a member of the Youth for Christ advisory board as well as the Family Counseling advisory board. In 2016, during the sex scandal involving Bentley, First Baptist Church of Tuscaloosa's senior pastor, Gil McKee, issued a statement saying, "While church discipline is a church family matter, both Governor Robert Bentley and Mrs. Rebekah Mason are no longer members of First Baptist Church Tuscaloosa. I continue to pray for each of them".

As governor, he served on the board of trustees for the colleges and universities of Alabama. He is also on the board of trustees of the Alabama Medical Education Consortium, which he helped to found. Bentley was the 2009 recipient of the Christian Coalition of Alabama's Statesmanship Award.

In August 2015, Dianne Bentley filed to divorce Bentley, saying there had been an "irretrievable breakdown" in their marriage and that further attempts at reconciliation were impossible. Records of the divorce case were sealed, per a ruling on August 31, 2015, by County Circuit Judge Elizabeth Hamner. Governor Bentley had appointed Tuscaloosa County Circuit Judge Elizabeth Hamner to the bench and her current position in 2011. The divorce was finalized on September 29, 2015.

== Electoral history ==
Alabama House of Representative 63rd district election, 2002
Party	Candidate	Votes	%	±
Republican	Robert Bentley	8,615	63.63	
Democratic	Jeanette VanderMeer	4,909	36.26	
Write-ins	Write-ins	15	0.11	

Alabama House of Representatives 63rd district election, 2006
Party	Candidate	Votes	%	±
Republican	Robert Bentley (inc.)	9,061	97.72	
Write-ins	Write-ins	211	2.28	

Alabama gubernatorial Republican primary election, 2010
Party	Candidate	Votes	%	±
Republican	Bradley Byrne	137,451	27.89	
Republican	Robert Bentley	123,958	25.15	
Republican	Tim James	123,792	25.12	
Republican	Roy Moore	95,163	19.31	
Republican	Bill Johnson	8,362	1.70	
Republican	Charles Taylor	2,622	0.53	
Republican	James Potts	1,549	0.31	

Alabama gubernatorial Republican primary runoff election, 2010
Party	Candidate	Votes	%	±
Republican	Robert Bentley	261,233	56.09	
Republican	Bradley Byrne	204,503	43.91	

Alabama gubernatorial election, 2010
Party	Candidate	Votes	%	±
Republican	Robert Bentley	860,472	57.58	
Democratic	Ron Sparks	625,710	41.87	
Write-ins	Write-ins	8,091	0.54	

Alabama gubernatorial Republican primary election, 2014
Party	Candidate	Votes	%	±
Republican	Robert Bentley (inc.)	388,247	89.35	
Republican	Stacey Lee George	25,134	5.78	
Republican	Bob Starkey	21,144	4.87	

Alabama gubernatorial election, 2014
Party	Candidate	Votes	%	±
Republican	Robert Bentley (inc.)	750,231	63.56	
Democratic	Parker Griffith	427,787	36.24	
Write-ins	Write-ins	2,395	0.20	

Party political offices
Preceded by Bob Riley	Republican nominee for Governor of Alabama; 2010, 2014	Succeeded by Kay Ivey
Political offices
Preceded by Bob Riley	Governor of Alabama; 2011–2017	Succeeded by Kay Ivey
U.S. order of precedence (ceremonial)
Preceded by Bob Riley as Former Governor	Order of precedence of the United States; Within Alabama	Succeeded by Jack Markell as Former Governor
Preceded by Bob Riley as Former Governor	Order of precedence of the United States; Outside Alabama	Succeeded by Kenneth M. Curtis as Former Governor
