= Steven Reed (mayor) =

American mayor and former judge

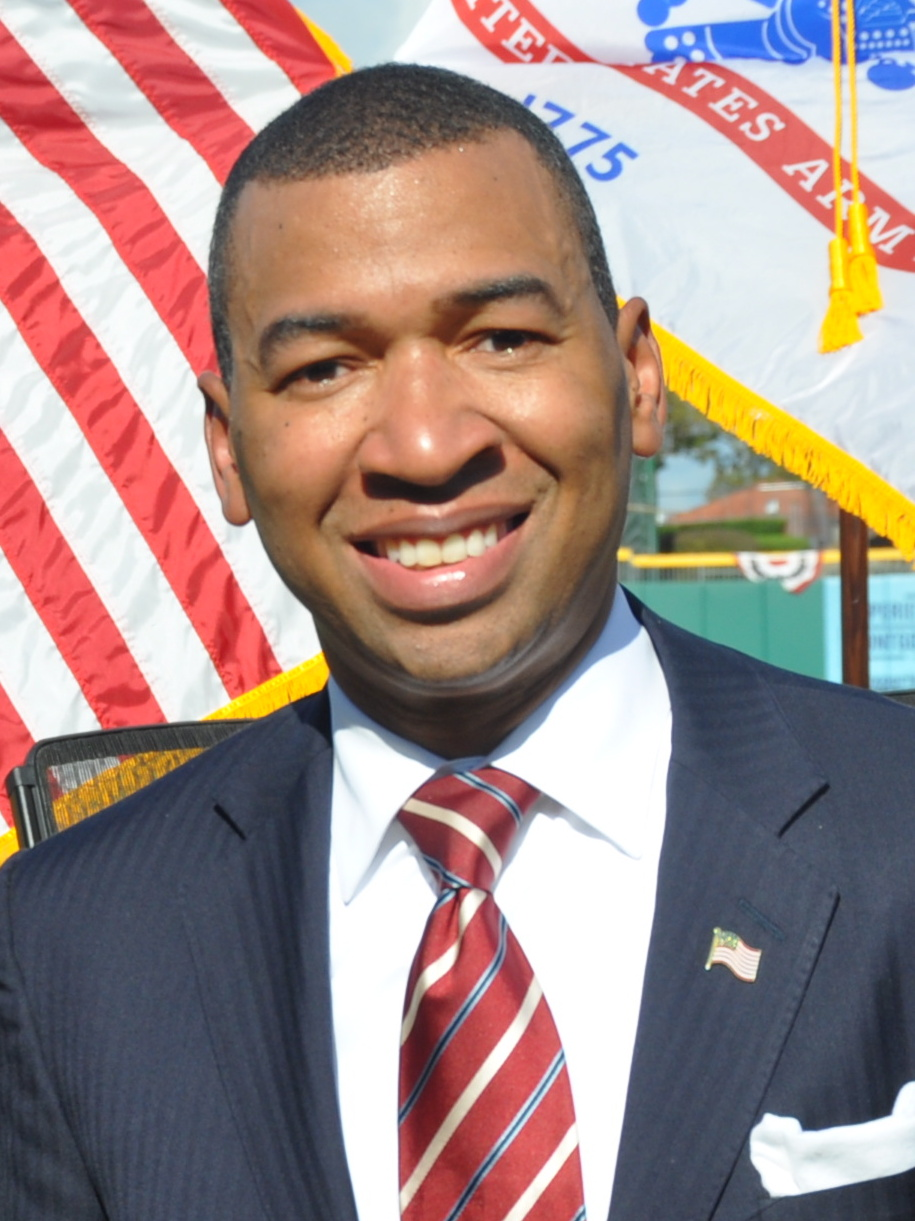

57th Mayor of Montgomery
- Incumbent
- Assumed office November 12, 2019
- Preceded by: Todd Strange

Probate Judge of Montgomery County, Alabama
- In office November 6, 2012 – November 12, 2019
- Preceded by: Reese McKinney, Jr
- Succeeded by: J C Love, III

Personal details
- Born: February 20, 1974 (age 52) Montgomery, Alabama, U.S.
- Party: Democratic
- Spouse: Tamika Reed
- Children: 3
- Education: Morehouse College (BA); Vanderbilt University (MBA)
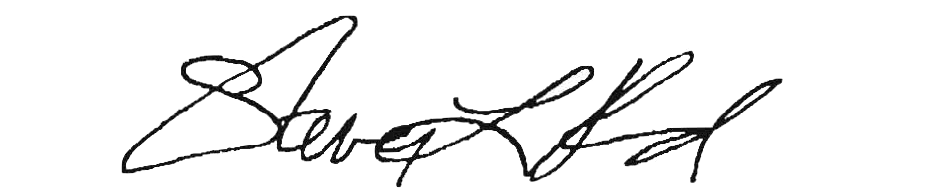
- Signature

Steven L. Reed (born February 20, 1974) is an American jurist, and politician, who is currently serving as the 57th mayor of Montgomery, Alabama since 2019. A member of the Democratic Party, he was a probate judge in Montgomery County. Reed is the first African-American mayor of Montgomery.

== Early life and education ==
Steven L. Reed was born in Montgomery, Alabama, to Joe and Mollie Reed (née Perry) as one of three children. His father, Joe, was one of the first class of elected members of the Montgomery City Council from 1975 to 1999. Reed earned a Bachelor of Arts from Morehouse College and a Master of Business Administration from Vanderbilt University.

Reed is a member of the Omega Psi Phi fraternity, having been initiated into its Theta Alpha graduate chapter in 1998.

== Early career ==
He was a financial analyst, then changed careers and lobbied the Alabama legislature, and worked for Lieutenant Governor Jim Folsom Jr.

Reed was elected as probate judge in 2012. In February 2015, he was the first probate judge in the state of Alabama who started issuing same-sex marriage licenses after district judge Callie V. Granade struck the state's ban on same-sex marriage, defying Alabama Chief Justice Roy Moore. In March 2015, after a ruling by the Alabama Supreme Court, he stopped issuing them.

== Mayor of Montgomery ==
Reed ran for mayor of Montgomery in the 2019 election, and defeated his opponent David Woods in a runoff. He was officially sworn in as mayor on November 12, 2019. Prior to being sworn in, Reed took part in a prayer service at the historic Dexter Avenue Baptist Church, which gained notoriety at the start of the Civil rights movement for leading the Montgomery bus boycott.

Reed ran for re-election in 2023, and defeated three opponents with 57% of the vote.

== Elections ==
=== Montgomery County Probate Judge ===
==== 2012 Democratic Primary ====
2012 Democratic Primary
Party	Candidate	Votes	%
Democratic	Mike Martin	2,984	17.95%
Democratic	Steven L. Reed	13,640	82.05%
Total votes		16,624	100.0%

==== 2012 General Election ====
2012 General Election
Party	Candidate	Votes	%
Republican	Reese McKinney, Jr.	48,708	48.47%
Democratic	Steven L. Reed	51,713	51.46%
Write-in		76	0.07%
Total votes		100,497	100.0%

==== 2018 General Election ====
2018 General Election
Party	Candidate	Votes	%
Democratic	Steven L. Reed	53,480	98.53%
Write-in		796	1.47%
Total votes		54,276	100.0%

=== Montgomery Mayor ===
==== 2019 First round ====
First round results
Party	Candidate	Votes	%
Nonpartisan	Steven Reed	18,571	42.49
Nonpartisan	David Woods	10,272	23.50
Nonpartisan	Ed Crowell	5,272	12.06
Nonpartisan	J. C. Love III	4,251	9.73
Nonpartisan	Elton Norris Dean Sr.	1,835	4.20
Nonpartisan	Artur Davis	1,784	4.08
Nonpartisan	Victorrus Felder	879	2.01
Nonpartisan	Shannon Ferrari	289	0.64
Nonpartisan	Ronald L. Davis	186	0.43
Nonpartisan	Bibby Simmons	156	0.36
Nonpartisan	Butler Browder	127	0.29
Nonpartisan	Hobson Cox	92	0.21

==== 2019 Second round ====
Runoff results
Party	Candidate	Votes	%
Nonpartisan	Steven Reed	32,918	67.2
Nonpartisan	David Woods	16,010	32.7

==== 2023 General ====
2023 Mayoral Election Results
Party	Candidate	Votes	%
Nonpartisan	Steven Reed	22,906	56.9%
Nonpartisan	Barrett Gilbreath	15,640	38.8%
Nonpartisan	Victorrus Felder	1,336	3.3%
Nonpartisan	Marcus McNeal	384	1.0%

== See also ==
- List of first African-American mayors

Political offices
Preceded by Todd Strange	Mayor of Montgomery; 2019–present	Incumbent
