= Ron Sparks (politician) =

Alabama politician (born 1952)

28th Agriculture Commissioner of Alabama
- In office January 20, 2003 – January 17, 2011
- Governor: Bob Riley
- Preceded by: Charles Bishop
- Succeeded by: John McMillan

Member of the DeKalb County Commission from the 3rd district
- In office 1978–1982
- Preceded by: Auzie Anderson
- Succeeded by: Cecil Shirey

Personal details
- Born: October 29, 1952 (age 73) Fort Payne, Alabama, U.S.
- Party: Democratic
- Children: 3
- Education: Northeast Alabama Community College

Military service
- Branch/service: United States Coast Guard
- Unit: Search and rescue

Ronald D. Sparks (born October 29, 1952) is an American politician from the state of Alabama. He served as the state's Commissioner of Agriculture and Industries from 2003 to 2011. Sparks is a member of the Democratic Party, and was the Democratic nominee for Governor of Alabama in 2010.

Sparks ran the state's Rural Development Agency from 2011 to 2017.

== Early life, education and career ==
Sparks is a graduate of Fort Payne High School. His parents were divorced, and he was raised by his grandmother. While staying with his father in Merritt Island, Florida, in 1971, Sparks joined the United States Coast Guard and was Initially stationed in Puerto Rico, he transferred to work on the Tennessee River. He became a BM2 E5 Boatswain's mate and earned a Coast Guard Commendation Medal for his service. Following his discharge from the service, Sparks graduated from Northeast Alabama Community College in 1978.

In 1978, at the age of 24, Sparks became a County Commissioner for DeKalb County, Alabama, one of the youngest elected in the State of Alabama. He defeated a two-term incumbent. At first, Sparks could not find anyone to donate to his campaign; he sold his furniture and gun for initial funding.

Sparks returned to the private sector. In 1993, Sparks was appointed Director of the newly created DeKalb County 911 System. As director he was responsible for overseeing the construction of the headquarters office, procuring equipment, hiring and training staff, and field verifying street addresses for over 30,000 homes and businesses. Sparks was elected the President of the Alabama chapter of the National Emergency Number Association in 1998.

== Department of Agriculture and Industries ==
In 1999, Sparks was appointed as Assistant Commissioner of Agriculture and Industries, where he ran the day-to-day operations of the department. In 2002, Sparks was elected Commissioner, winning 54 out of 67 counties, and defeating his Republican opponent in the general election by a margin of 53%-47%. In that campaign, Sparks was briefly criticized for appearing in media produced by the department. However, he responded that the media in question was time-sensitive, and that the then-Commissioner had scaled back his involvement in the department's operations following his own defeat in the gubernatorial primary a few months earlier. In this campaign, Sparks became one of the rare Democrats to win the endorsement of the Alabama Farmers Federation.

During his first term as Commissioner, Sparks pushed for country-of-origin labeling for food and agricultural products, citing health problems and under-cost dumping associated with imports from certain countries. He also initiated the establishment of state laboratories for expanded testing of food and agricultural products. Sparks also led efforts to open the Cuban market to Alabama farm products, traveling to the nation and meeting with Cuban leader Fidel Castro, leading to Cuba's agreement to begin imports from Alabama.

He was re-elected in 2006 winning 62 of 67 counties. During this campaign, even The Birmingham News, which had criticized Sparks four years earlier, spoke favorably of Sparks's handling of a mad cow disease scare that could have threatened the state's cattle industry. Sparks built on his 2002 margin, defeating his Republican opponent by a margin of 59%-41%, making Sparks the leading statewide candidate on the Democratic ticket.

During his second term, Sparks continued the expansion of the state lab system. When a salmonella outbreak linked to tomatoes occurred in the spring of 2008, Sparks acted to secure verification that tomatoes grown in Alabama were not suspected of contamination with the disease, and to facilitate marketing of those tomatoes as "safe."

Sparks is the 2007-08 President of the National Association of State Departments of Agriculture. He took over as President of the association at its annual meeting in September 2008.

== Political involvement ==
It was rumored that Sparks would run for the Senate seat then held by Jeff Sessions, but he declined to run to avoid a primary contest with state Senator Vivian Davis Figures. Sparks backed the 2008 presidential effort of Hillary Clinton. Sparks, who was ineligible for a third term as Commissioner, was mentioned as a candidate for governor or lieutenant governor in 2010. He launched a website, sparks2010.com, in late 2008. The site promoted a Sparks candidacy in 2010, without initially specifying which office he might seek.

== 2010 candidacy for governor ==
On April 3, 2009, Ron Sparks announced that he would run for governor of Alabama. In what was regarded as an upset, Sparks defeated Congressman Artur Davis in a landslide in the Democratic primary on June 1, 2010. Tensions over Davis' opposition to healthcare reform legislation, along with Davis' decision to not seek the support of traditional Democratic Party groups and his ignoring the needs of his constituents in his congressional district, led voters to overwhelmingly vote for Sparks in the Democratic Primary.

Early in the 2010 campaign, Sparks voiced support for healthcare reform, opposed charter schools, supported the Stimulus, and advocated an educational lottery and gaming tax for pre-kindergarten and college scholarships.

Following Parker Griffith's switch to the Republican party, Sparks' political consultants encouraged him to run for Griffith's seat in the United States House of Representatives, however he declined and chose to remain in the running for Governor.

Robert Bentley, the Republican nominee for governor, defeated Sparks with 58% of the vote.

== Post-gubernatorial race ==
After his loss in the 2010 General Election, Sparks was rumored as a possible candidate for Chairman of the Alabama Democratic Party. In a December 6, 2010 article in the Montgomery Advertiser, Sparks said he would support former State Supreme Court Justice Mark Kennedy, son-in-law of former Governor George C. Wallace, for the post of party chairman.

After Bentley's inauguration, the governor merged Alabama's Rural Action Commission and Black Belt Commission into the state's Rural Development Agency, and appointed Sparks to run it. In April 2017, Governor Kay Ivey abolished the Office of Rural Development and fired Sparks.

On June 7, 2019, U.S. Senator Doug Jones hired Sparks as his Regional Director for the Middle District of Alabama, which includes Montgomery and Dothan.

Sparks is running for Agriculture Commissioner again in the 2026 elections.

Party political offices
Preceded by Charles Bishop	Democratic nominee for Agriculture Commissioner of Alabama; 2002, 2006	Succeeded by Glen Zorn
Preceded by Lucy Baxley	Democratic nominee for Governor of Alabama; 2010	Succeeded by Parker Griffith
