= 2002 Alabama Commissioner of Agriculture and Industries election =

- November 5, 2002
Candidate	Ron Sparks	Lee Alley
Party	Democratic	Republican
Popular vote	656,382	590,350
Percentage	51.3%	46.2%
- County results Sparks: 40–50% 50–60% 60–70% 70–80% 80–90% Alley: 50–60% 60–70% 70–80%
Commissioner before election
Charles Bishop
Democratic
Elected Commissioner
Ron Sparks
Democratic

The 2002 Alabama Commissioner of Agriculture and Industries election election was held on November 5, 2002, to elect the Alabama Commissioner of Agriculture and Industries. Ron Sparks was elected to his first four-year term.

== Democratic primary ==
=== Candidates ===
==== Nominee ====
- Ron Sparks, assistant commissioner of agriculture and industries

==== Eliminated in primary ====
- Nathan Mathis, former state representative (1983–1995)
- Jacky Warhurst, Franklin County revenue commissioner

=== Results ===
Democratic primary
Party	Candidate	Votes	%
Democratic	Ron Sparks	183,097	51.34
Democratic	Nathan Mathis	120,861	33.89
Democratic	Jacky Warhurst	52,670	14.77
Total votes		356,628	100.00

== Republican primary ==
=== Candidates ===
==== Nominee ====
- Lee Alley, associate commissioner of agriculture and former Dekalb County commissioner

==== Eliminated in primary ====
- Richard Nixon, restaurant owner (no relation to former president Richard Nixon)

=== Results ===
Republican primary
Party	Candidate	Votes	%
Republican	Lee Alley	167,067	61.40
Republican	Richard Nixon	105,009	38.60
Total votes		272,076	100.00

== Third-party candidates ==
=== Libertarian Party nominee ===
- Maude G. Hulcher

== General election ==
=== Results ===
2002 Alabama Commissioner of Agriculture and Industries election
Party	Candidate	Votes	%
Democratic	Ron Sparks	656,382	51.32
Republican	Lee Alley	590,350	46.16
Libertarian	Maude G. Hulcher	31,442	2.46
Write-in		859	0.07
Total votes		1,279,033	100.00
