= 2006 Alabama Commissioner of Agriculture and Industries election =

- November 7, 2006
Candidate	Ron Sparks	Albert Lipscomb
Party	Democratic	Republican
Popular vote	701,320	485,275
Percentage	59.1%	40.9%
- County results Sparks: 50–60% 60–70% 70–80% 80–90% Lipscomb: 50–60% 60–70%
Commissioner before election
Ron Sparks
Democratic
Elected Commissioner
Ron Sparks
Democratic

The 2006 Alabama Commissioner of Agriculture and Industries election was held on November 7, 2006, to elect the Alabama Commissioner of Agriculture and Industries. Incumbent Democratic commissioner Ron Sparks was re-elected to a second consecutive term.

== Democratic primary ==
=== Candidates ===
==== Nominee ====
- Ron Sparks, incumbent commissioner

== Republican primary ==
=== Candidates ===
==== Nominee ====
- Albert Lipscomb, state senator from the 32nd district (1989–2002)

== General election ==
=== Results ===
2006 Alabama Commissioner of Agriculture and Industries election
Party	Candidate	Votes	%
Democratic	Ron Sparks	701,320	59.07
Republican	Albert Lipscomb	485,275	40.87
Write-in		750	0.06
Total votes		1,187,345	100.00
