= W. A. Gayle =

American politician (1896–1965)

51st Mayor of Montgomery
- In office 1951–1959
- Preceded by: John L. Goodwyn
- Succeeded by: Earl D. James

Personal details
- Born: March 5, 1896 Montgomery, Alabama
- Died: July 5, 1965 (aged 69) Montgomery, Alabama
- Spouse: Katharine Anderson
- Occupation: Soldier, author, politician
- Awards: Bronze Star

Military service
- Branch/service: United States Navy; United States Army Air Forces
- Battles/wars: World War I, World War II

William Armistead "Tacky" Gayle, Jr. (March 5, 1896 – July 5, 1965) was an American politician for the Democratic Party, soldier and writer who was the mayor of Montgomery, Alabama, from 1951 to 1959.

Gayle was born in 1896, the son of William A. and Mary (née Winn) Gayle. He served during World War I in the United States Navy, having attended the United States Naval Academy. He later attended the University of Alabama from 1915 to 1916. After the war, he worked for the Anderson Coal Company as a manager. Gayle, who held the rank of Brigadier General, was appointed by Governor Bibb Graves on April 2, 1935 to serve as Adjutant General of Alabama. He previously served as Assistant Adjutant General in Graves' administration. He resigned on October 1, 1935 to become commissioner of Montgomery, Alabama.

During World War II, Gayle returned to active duty, serving in the United States Army Air Forces. After the war, he would continue to serve in the Alabama National Guard. He served as public works commissioner of the City of Montgomery when he was elected as mayor in 1951. Gayle served as Mayor of Montgomery from 1951 to 1959. The Montgomery bus boycott occurred during his term as mayor from 1955 to 1956. He was named the defendant of the Browder v. Gayle federal court case that ended the boycott and racial segregation on the buses in Montgomery. Gayle died on July 5, 1965. The W. A. Gayle Planetarium in Montgomery's Oak Park is named in his honor.

== Civil rights record ==
Gayle was initially a moderate to even moderate liberal on the issue of civil rights for African-Americans, enjoying a high popularity among African Americans. As the bus boycotting continued, Gayle took more aggressive stances against African-Americans, particularly those boycotting, and lost his popularity and standing among the city's African-American population.
