= Tim James (Alabama politician) =

American politician (born 1962)

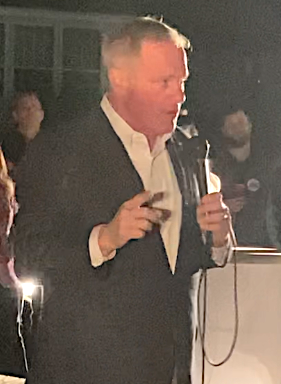
- James campaigning in 2022

Personal details
- Born: March 3, 1962 (age 64) Opelika, Alabama, U.S.
- Party: Republican
- Relatives: Fob James (father)
- Education: Auburn University (BS)
- Website: Campaign website

Tim James (born March 3, 1962) is an American businessman and political candidate from Alabama. The son of former Alabama Governor Fob James, James is a toll road developer and contractor currently serving as the president of Tim James Inc., an infrastructure company. He sought and lost the Republican Party nomination for governor of Alabama three times, finishing third in the Republican primaries in 2002, 2010 and 2022.

== Early life and education ==
James was born in Opelika, Alabama, the son of Fob and Bobbie James. He attended Baylor School in Tennessee, where he played high school football, and then Auburn University in Auburn, Alabama, where he earned a degree in finance and was a running back on the Auburn Tigers football. While at Auburn University, he was a member of the Kappa Alpha Order.

== Business ==
James has owned and operated asphalt and heavy construction businesses; with his father and brothers, James formed and operated the Escambia County Environmental Corp., an incineration company treating non-hazardous industrial waste, from 1986-1996. James helped found the toll road business Baldwin County Bridge Co. in 1996. He was involved in the building of the Foley Beach Express in the 1990s.

In 2004, Baldwin County Bridge Co., owner of the Foley Beach Express toll bridge, entered into a revenue sharing agreement with the City of Orange Beach, Alabama. In 2006, James sold the Baldwin County Bridge Company to the Australian Macquarie Group.

In 2019, James founded Tim James Inc., a family-owned construction, development, infrastructure and toll road development company. The company has worked on infrastructure projects in Bossier Parish, Louisiana, Caddo Parish, Louisiana, and Shelby County, Alabama, the latter of which is the site of the proposed Coosa River Express toll bridge.

== Political positions ==
The Washington Post has described James as a conservative Republican. Alabama columnist Steve Flowers described him as "extremely conservative." James himself has said his political campaigns aim to protect "America's foundation: faith, family and freedom."

James was an outspoken opponent of then-President Barack Obama's economic proposals while campaigning for governor in 2010. He stated during a campaign stop in Oxford that financial corporations, the auto industry, and insurance companies should not be bailed out by taxpayers but should file bankruptcy. He also called for improvements to education, including higher pay for school administrators and more autonomy for principals and teachers; he also supports school choice.

James opposes the legalization of gambling as a means to fund education; in 2021, he accused Republican Party leadership of attempting to turn Alabama into the "Las Vegas of the South" with a recent state gambling bill. James opposes public funding for abortions. Despite the federal legalization of same-sex marriage in the United States in 2015, James stated in 2021 that he would push for banning same-sex marriage again if elected governor.

While James supports building a wall across the US-Mexico border, he acknowledges Alabama could not directly participate in its construction. He believes Alabama should take greater steps to prevent illegal immigration via the Port of Mobile.

During the 2017 special election for the U.S. Senate in Alabama, James endorsed eventual Republican nominee Roy Moore, whom he had previously ran against during his 2010 gubernatorial campaign. James had previously been interviewed by then-Governor Robert Bentley for an appointment to the same U.S. Senate seat, vacated by the resignation of Jeff Sessions in 2016, but was ultimately not selected.

In 2021, James called transgender acceptance, critical race theory and yoga in gym class part of a "beast with three heads" that endangered children in the public school system. He supports the right to decline COVID-19 vaccines, and is himself not vaccinated. In 2022, James spoke out against an LGBT-friendly charter school putting on a drag show for students, referring to it as "abuse". An AL.com opinion article by Kyle Whitmire compared the drag show to a pep rally that James had attended as a high schooler, pictured in the Baylor School yearbook, a comparison that James rejected, stating "I don't care if you take that picture of the Baylor football team and blast it all over, you're just gonna help me because people know better. I wish you would."

== Gubernatorial campaigns ==
=== 2002 election ===
James ran for the Republican nomination for Alabama governor in 2002, but finished in last place in the Republican primary: Bob Riley received 73.5% of the vote, Steve Windom received 17.8%, and James received 8.6%. He focused on economic issues during the campaign.

Former state representative Mike Hubbard described James' 2002 campaign as one that was intended to "lay the predicate" for a future, more serious run, which eventually materialized in 2010. The campaign also came just four years after James' father, Governor Fob James, lost his re-election bid to Don Siegelman.

=== 2010 election ===
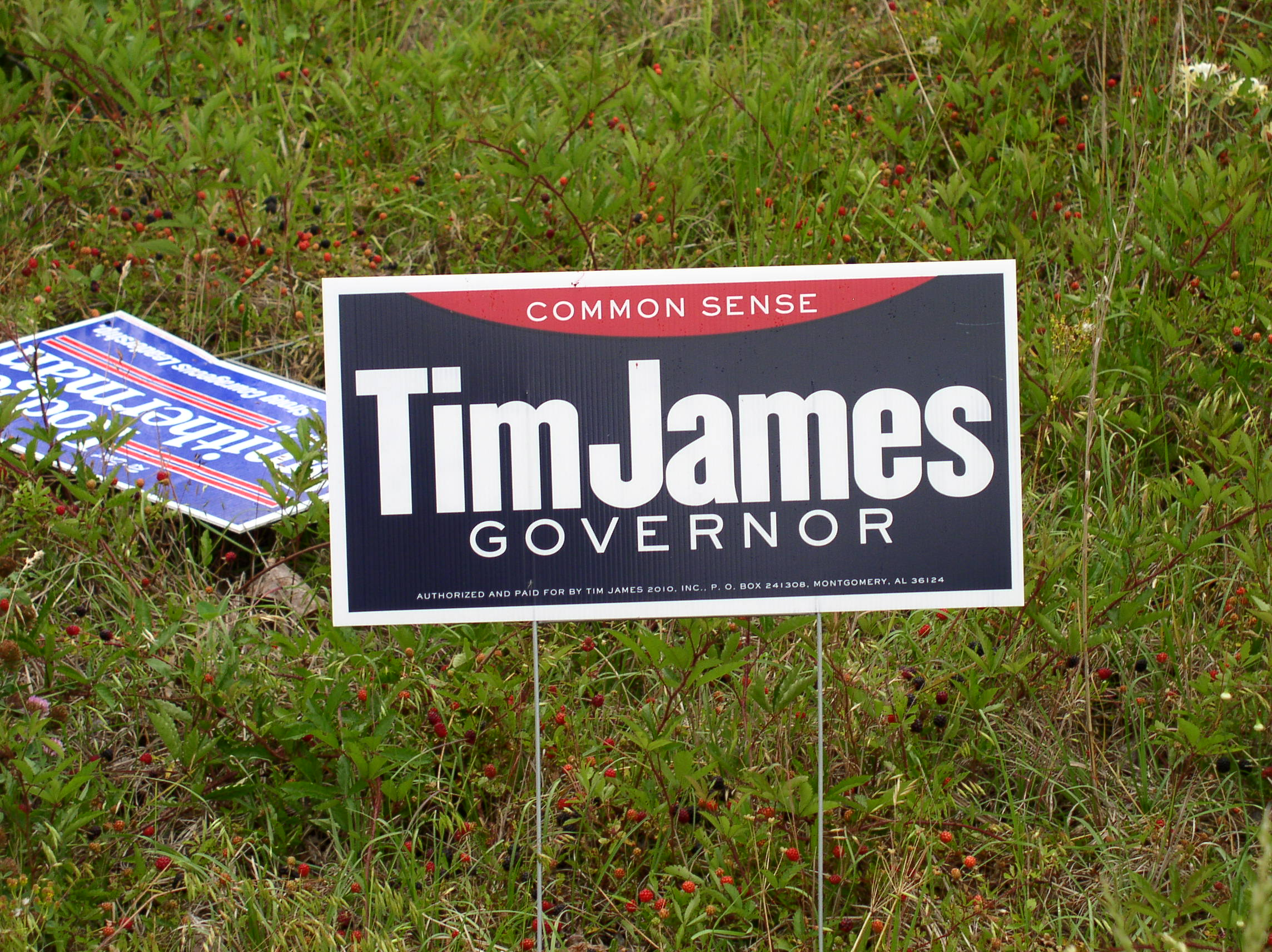
Tim James campaign sign, 2010

James's 2010 campaign was managed by Sandra Lucas, a former staffer of Governor Bob Riley. James' campaign chairman was former U.S. Congressman Sonny Callahan of Mobile. U.S. Congressman Robert Aderholt served as an advisor to the campaign.

In April 2010, James said that if elected governor, he would end multilingual testing for driver's licenses in Alabama in favor of English-only testing. James' "we speak English" campaign commercial gained national attention. An Anniston Star analysis argued that the virality of James' advertisement gave him the chance to present himself as a candidate "who irks out-of-state liberals".

James ultimately came in third in the Republican primary, losing a runoff berth to second-place finisher (and eventual primary winner) Robert J. Bentley by 167 votes. James launched a recount effort due to the thin margin, but ultimately conceded on June 21, 2010, after the results were confirmed.

James' loss in the 2010 election was attributed to a number of reasons: James was the subject of negative advertisements from Bradley Byrne, whose campaign believed it had the edge over James in a potential Byrne-James runoff, according to polling. Additionally, Bentley had broad support in Tuscaloosa and the northwestern part of the state, allowing him to edge out James for a spot in the runoff. Finally, during the primary, James jokingly made a comment about firing or reducing the pay of head University of Alabama football coach Nick Saban, which ultimately harmed his campaign.

=== 2022 election ===
In December 2021, James filed paperwork with the Alabama Secretary of State to again run for governor in the 2022 Alabama gubernatorial election. He officially announced his campaign on December 6, challenging incumbent Governor Kay Ivey. Regarding his reasons for entering the primary race, James cited a recent gas tax increase, the handling of the COVID-19 pandemic, and mask mandates, among other events that have made conservative voters "anxious."

James held a kick-off event for his campaign on the steps of the Alabama State Capitol on January 12, 2022, and gave a speech in which he appealed to Evangelical voters and "traded his platform for a pulpit," as described by CBS 42. Although he described Governor Ivey as a family friend, he claimed that her administration had been "overwhelmed" and criticized the state's approval of medical marijuana and its poorly-ranked public education system.

During his 2022 campaign, James repeatedly targeted the Magic City Acceptance Academy, an LGBTQ-affirming charter school in Homewood, Alabama. On April 11, 2022, James released an ad titled "Genesis," in which photos of MCAA students and faculty were included; the founding principal of the school stated that the photos were likely taken from social media sites. After the ad aired, MCAA implemented increased security measures. In response, James' campaign stated, "What should scare mothers and fathers of these children is what the faculty is doing by presenting this ungodly display through the drag show to which the children were subjected."

In the May 24 primary, James finished in third place with 16% of the vote, while incumbent Governor Ivey avoided a run-off entirely. James conceded the election to Ivey via a phone call; afterwards, James told 1819 News that he would likely end his political efforts and return to focusing on business.

== Personal life ==
James lives in Greenville, Alabama, with his wife Angela. The couple have three children: Fleming, Tim Jr., and Sarah.

== Electoral history ==
2022 Alabama gubernatorial election, Republican primary results
Party	Candidate	Votes	%
Republican	Kay Ivey (incumbent)	356,347	54.46%
Republican	Lynda Blanchard	125,915	19.24%
Republican	Tim James	105,936	16.19%
Republican	Lew Burdette	42,803	6.54%
Republican	Dean Odle	11,720	1.79%
Republican	Donald Trent Jones	3,906	0.58%
Republican	Dave Thomas	2,879	0.44%
Republican	Stacy Lee George	2,539	0.39%
Republican	Dean Young	2,344	0.36%
Total votes		654,290	100%

2010 Alabama gubernatorial election, Republican primary results
Party	Candidate	Votes	%
Republican	Bradley Byrne	137,451	27.89
Republican	Robert J. Bentley	123,958	25.15
Republican	Tim James	123,792	25.12
Republican	Roy Moore	95,163	19.31
Republican	Bill Johnson	8,362	1.70
Republican	Charles Taylor	2,622	0.53
Republican	James Potts	1,549	0.31
Total votes		492,897	100.0%

2002 Alabama gubernatorial election, Republican primary results
Party	Candidate	Votes	%
Republican	Bob Riley	262,851	73.5%
Republican	Steve Windom	63,775	17.8%
Republican	Tim James	30,871	8.6%
Total votes		357,497	100.0%
