= 2010 Alabama gubernatorial election =

- November 2, 2010
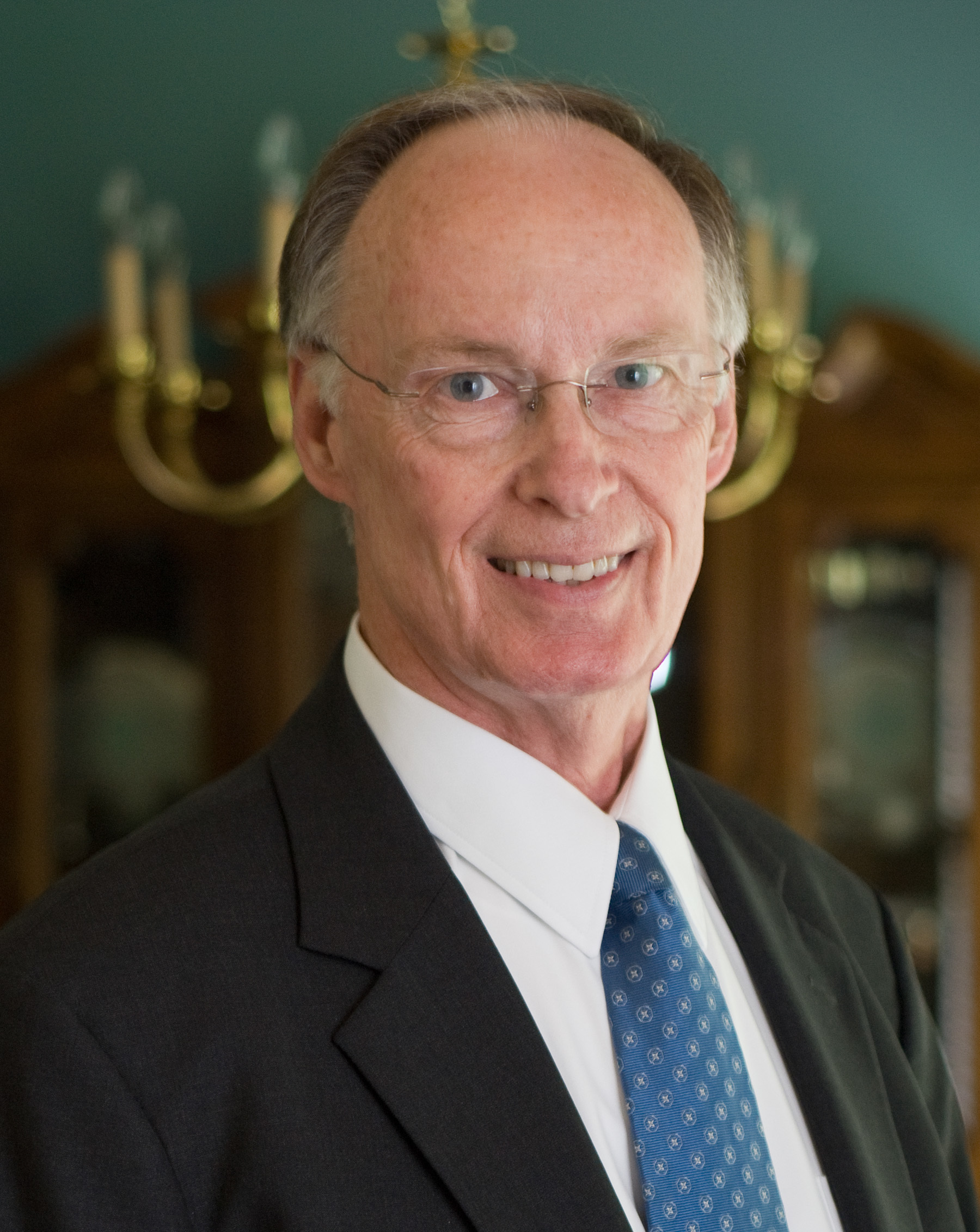

Nominee	Robert J. Bentley	Ron Sparks
Party	Republican	Democratic
Popular vote	860,472	625,710
Percentage	57.58%	41.87%
- County results Bentley: 50–60% 60–70% 70–80% Sparks: 50–60% 60–70% 70–80% 80–90%
Governor before election
Bob Riley
Republican
Elected Governor
Robert J. Bentley
Republican

The 2010 Alabama gubernatorial election took place on November 2, 2010. Incumbent Governor Bob Riley was term-limited and unable to seek re-election. The party primaries were held on June 1, 2010, with a Republican runoff on July 13. In the general election, Robert J. Bentley defeated Democrat Ron Sparks. This was the first election in which Republicans won three consecutive gubernatorial elections in the state. This was also the first time since Reconstruction that a Republican carried Colbert County, Franklin County, and Lawrence County in a gubernatorial race.

== Republican primary ==
=== Candidates ===
- Robert J. Bentley, state representative
- Bradley Byrne, former state two-year college chancellor, former state senator and former member of the Alabama State Board of Education
- Tim James, businessman, son of former Governor Fob James and candidate for governor in 2002
- Bill Johnson, former director of the Alabama Department of Economic and Community Affairs and former Birmingham city councilman
- Roy Moore, former chief justice of the Alabama Supreme Court and candidate for governor in 2006
- James Potts, perennial candidate
- Charles Taylor, perennial candidate

=== Endorsements ===
Robert J. Bentley

State governors

- Mike Huckabee, former governor of Arkansas and candidate for president in 2008
Bradley Byrne

Individuals

- Ben Brooks, state senator
- Jeb Bush, former governor of Florida
- Jack Edwards, former U.S. representative from Alabama's 1st congressional district
- Brian LeCompte, conservative blogger
- Jimmy Rane, president of Great Southern Wood
- State Representatives Mike Ball, Phil Williams, Jamie Ison, Chad Fincher, Victor Gaston, and Jim Barton
- Mobile City Council members John Williams and Connie Hudson

Associations

- Alabama Association of Realtors
- Alabama Home Builders Association
- Alabama Retail Association
- Associated Builders and Contractors of Alabama
- Right on Huntsville
Tim James

U.S. representatives

- Robert Aderholt, U.S. representative from Alabama's 4th congressional district

Organizations

- Alabama Republican Assembly
Roy Moore

Individuals

- Bobby Allison, former NASCAR driver and founder of the Alabama Gang

=== Polling ===
Source	Date(s) administered	Robert J. Bentley	Bradley Byrne	Kay Ivey	Tim James	Bill Johnson	Roy Moore	Undecided
Research 2000	May 17–19, 2010	9%	29%	--	17%	3%	23%	17%
Public Strategy Associates	May 10–11, 2010	12%	24%	n/a	23%	2%	18%	21%
Ayres, McHenry and Associates	May 3–4, 2010	7%	20%	n/a	26%	n/a	21%	26%
Public Policy Polling	March 27–29, 2010	10%	27%	10%	9%	1%	23%	20%
Public Strategy Associates	February 3–4, 2010	4%	20%	3%	8%	2%	17%	46%

=== Results ===
Primary results by county: Byrne: 40–50%; 30–40%; 20–30%; Bentley: 20–30%; 30–40%; 40–50%; 50–60%; 60–70%; James: 20–30%; 30–40%; 40–50%; 50–60%; Moore: 40–50%; 30–40%; 20–30%

Republican primary results
Party	Candidate	Votes	%
Republican	Bradley Byrne	137,451	27.89
Republican	Robert J. Bentley	123,958	25.15
Republican	Tim James	123,792	25.12
Republican	Roy Moore	95,163	19.31
Republican	Bill Johnson	8,362	1.70
Republican	Charles Taylor	2,622	0.53
Republican	James Potts	1,549	0.31
Total votes		492,897	100.0%

Primary runoff results by county: Bentley: 50–60%; 60–70%; 70–80%; 80–90%; 90–100%; Byrne: 60–70%; 50–60%

Republican primary runoff results (July 13, 2010)
Party	Candidate	Votes	%
Republican	Robert J. Bentley	260,887	56.07
Republican	Bradley Byrne	204,394	43.93
Total votes		465,281	100.00

== Democratic primary ==
=== Candidates ===
- Artur Davis, U.S. representative
- Ron Sparks, Alabama commissioner of agriculture and industries

=== Polling ===
Source	Date(s) administered	Artur Davis	Ron Sparks	Sam Franklin	Undecided
Research 2000	May 17–19, 2010	41%	33%	--	11%
Public Policy Polling	March 27–29, 2010	38%	28%	9%	25%

=== Results ===
Primary results by county: Sparks: 50–60%; 60–70%; 70–80%; 80–90%; Davis: 60–70%; 50–60%

Democratic primary results
Party	Candidate	Votes	%
Democratic	Ron Sparks	199,558	62.44
Democratic	Artur Davis	120,050	37.56
Total votes		319,608	100.00

== General election ==
=== Predictions ===
Source	Ranking	As of
Cook Political Report	Likely R	October 14, 2010
Rothenberg	Safe R	October 28, 2010
RealClearPolitics	Safe R	November 1, 2010
Sabato's Crystal Ball	Likely R	October 28, 2010
CQ Politics	Lean R	October 28, 2010

=== Polling ===
Poll source	Dates administered	Robert Bentley (R)	Ron Sparks (D)
Rasmussen Reports	September 21, 2010	55%	35%
Rasmussen Reports	August 19, 2010	58%	34%
Rasmussen Reports	July 22, 2010	55%	35%
Rasmussen Reports	June 3, 2010	56%	37%
Rasmussen Reports	May 25, 2010	44%	31%

=== Results ===
2010 Alabama gubernatorial election
Party	Candidate	Votes	%	±%
Republican	Robert J. Bentley	860,472	57.58%	+0.13%
Democratic	Ron Sparks	625,710	41.87%	+0.30%
Write-in		8,091	0.54%	-0.44%
Total votes		1,494,273	100.00%	N/A
Republican hold				

==== Counties that flipped from Republican to Democratic ====
- Jefferson County (largest city: Birmingham)
- Butler (largest city: Greenville)
- Chambers (largest city: Valley)
- Montgomery (largest city: Montgomery)
- Henry (largest city: Headland)

==== Counties that flipped from Democratic to Republican ====
- Franklin (largest city: Russellville)
- Marion (largest city: Hamilton)
- Walker (largest city: Jasper)
- Colbert (largest city: Muscle Shoals)
- Lamar (largest city: Vernon)
- Talladega (largest city: Talladega)
- Lawrence (largest city: Moulton)

== See also ==
- List of governors of Alabama
