= List of mayors of Montgomery, Alabama =

This is a list of mayors who have served the city of Montgomery, Alabama, United States.

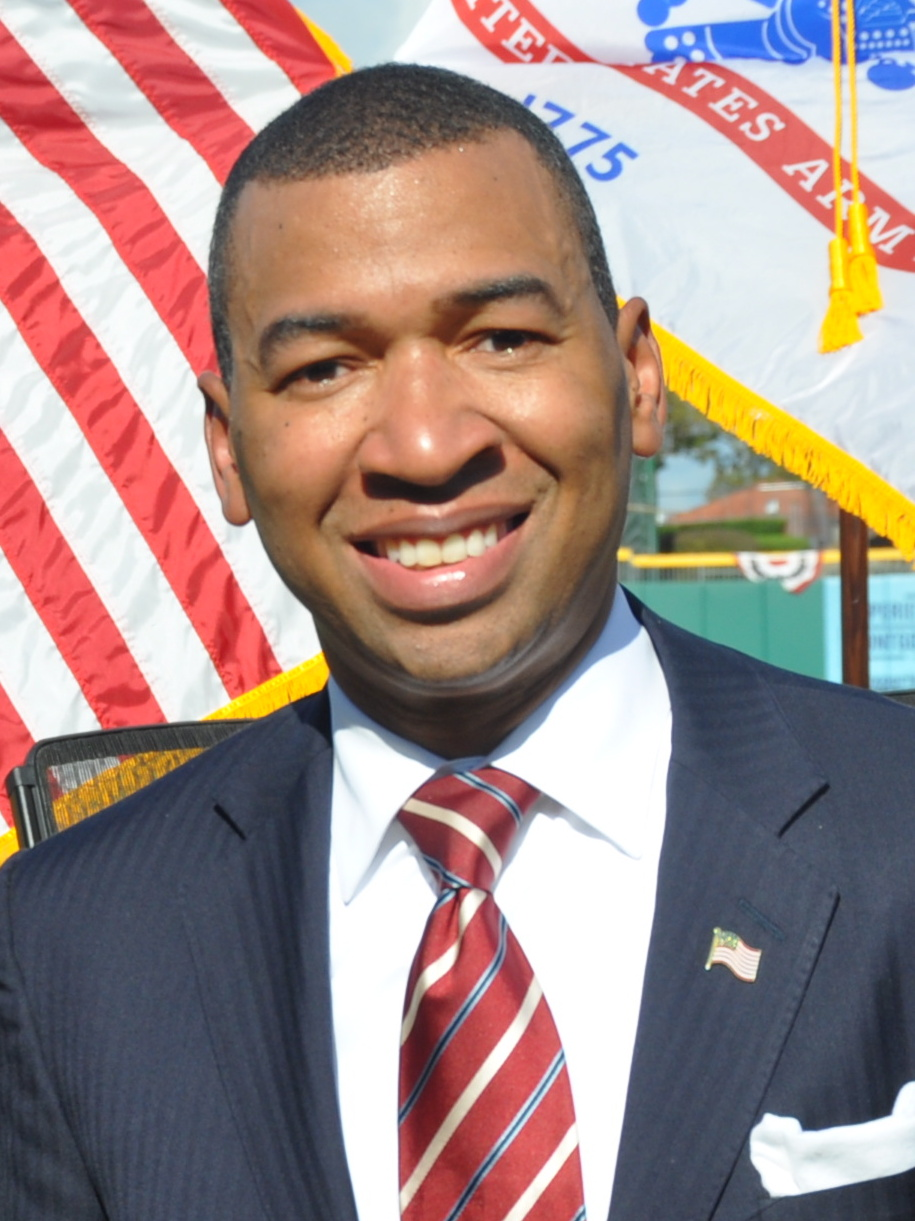
Steven Reed, incumbent mayor since November 12, 2019.

Image	Mayor	Term	Notes
	Samuel D. Holt (1st term)	1838	
	Jack Thorington	1839—1840	
	Hardy Herbet	1841	
	Perez Coleman	1842—1846	
	Nimrod E. Benson	1847	
	Edwin B. Harris	1848—1849	
	Robert T. Davis	1850	
	Thomas Welsh	1851	
	Samuel D. Holt (2nd term)	1852	
	Charles R. Hansford	1853—1859	
	Andrew J. Noble	1860—1861	
	J. F. Johnson	1862—1863	
	Walter L. Coleman	1864—1868	
	Thomas O. Glasscock	1868—1870	
	H.E. Faber	1870—1875	
	Mordecai L. Moses	1875—1881	
	J. B. Gaston	1881—1885	
	W. S. Reese	1885—1889	
	Edward A. Graham	1889—1891	
	John G. Crommelin, Sr.	1891—1895	
	John H. Clisby	1895—1899	
	E. B. Joseph	1900—1903	
	Thomas H. Carr	1903—1905	
	W. M. Teague	1905—1909	
	Gaston Gunter	1909—1910	
	William A. Gunter Jr. (1st term)	1911—1915	
	W.T. Robertson	1915—1919	
	William A. Gunter, Jr. (2nd term)	1919—1940	
	Cyrus B. Brown †	1941—August 8, 1944	Died in office on August 8, 1944.
	David E. Dunn	1944—1945	Resigned
	John L. Goodwyn	June 1946—1951	Elected to complete the term of Mayor Dunn who resigned; elected to a full term in May 1947. Appointed associate justice of the Supreme Court of Alabama in September 1951
	W. A. Gayle	1951—1959	
	Earl D. James	1959—1971	
	Jim Robinson	1971—1977	
	Emory Folmar	1977—1999	
	Bobby Bright	November 9, 1999—January 6, 2009	
	Charles Jinright	January 6, 2009—March 24, 2009	
	Todd Strange	March 24, 2009—November 12, 2019	
	Steven Reed	November 12, 2019—present	First African-American mayor

== See also ==
- Timeline of Montgomery, Alabama
- 2023 Montgomery mayoral election
