= Todd Strange =

American politician

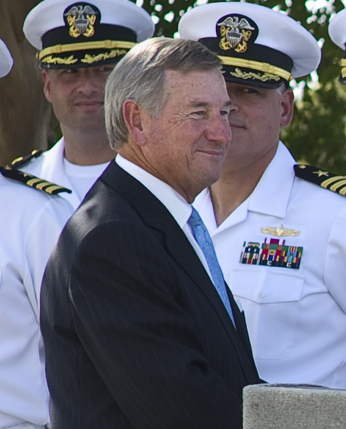

56th Mayor of Montgomery
- In office March 24, 2009 – November 12, 2019
- Preceded by: Charles Jinright (Acting)
- Succeeded by: Steven Reed

Personal details
- Born: 1943 or 1944 (age 81–82)
- Political party: Republican
- Spouse: Linda Davis
- Children: 2
- Education: University of Montevallo (BA)

Todd Strange (born c. 1944) is an American politician and businessman who was the 56th mayor of Montgomery, Alabama. Strange won a special election and took office on March 24, 2009, after his predecessor, Democrat Bobby Bright, was elected to the United States House of Representatives. Although municipal elections in Montgomery are nonpartisan, Strange is a Republican.

Before becoming mayor, Strange was chairman of the Montgomery County Commission for nearly five years. He also was president, CEO, and co-owner of Blount Strange Automotive Group.

Todd Strange is not related to Luther Strange, who served as Attorney General of Alabama (2011-2017), and as a Senator (2017-2018).

Political offices
Preceded by Charles Jinright; Acting	Mayor of Montgomery; 2009–2019	Succeeded by Steven Reed
