= Commandant of Cadets of the United States Air Force Academy =

The Commandant of Cadets at the United States Air Force Academy is the officer in charge of the Cadet Wing. Under the Superintendent, the Commandant oversees all of the cadets' military training at the academy. The position of Commandant has traditionally been filled by an active duty Air Force brigadier general, although occasionally, the office holder has been a major general. Since reorganization from October 1994 through August 2006, the Commandant was "dual-hatted" as the commander of the 34th Training Wing. In August 2006, the 34th Wing was redesignated Commandant of Cadets, a named organization.

== List of commandants of cadets ==
No.	Commandant of Cadets		Term			Class Year	Notes and Reference
No.	Portrait	Name	Took office	Left office	Term length	Class Year	Notes and Reference
1	Robert M. Stillman	Major General; Robert M. Stillman	1954	1958	~4 years	USMA 1935	(Note: Major general; bomber and reconnaissance pilot; World War II veteran and prisoner of war; first commandant at the Academy; later commanded the Lackland Military Training Center (1958–1961); named to the Sports Illustrated magazine Silver Anniversary All-American football team (1959))
2	Henry R. Sullivan Jr.	Major General; Henry R. Sullivan Jr.	1958	1961	~3 years	USMA 1939	(Note: Major general; bomber pilot; World War II veteran; later served as deputy chief of staff, operations, Headquarters Allied Air Forces Central Europe, and commander of all U.S. Air Force personnel assigned to the NATO headquarters and its supporting units)
3	William Seawell	Major General; William Seawell	1961	1963	~4 years	USMA 1941	
4	Robert William Strong Jr.	Major General; Robert William Strong Jr.	1963	1965	~2 years	USMA 1940	
5	Louis T. Seith	Brigadier General; Louis T. Seith	1965	1967	~2 years	USMA 1943	
6	Robin Olds	Brigadier General; Robin Olds	1967	1971	~4 years	USMA 1943	(Note: Renowned fighter pilot; World War II, Korean and Vietnam War veteran; triple ace with 16 confirmed air-to-air kills)
7	Walter T. Galligan	Brigadier General; Walter T. Galligan	1971	1973	~2 years	USMA 1945	
8	Hoyt S. Vandenberg Jr.	Brigadier General; Hoyt S. Vandenberg Jr.	1973	1975	~2 years	USMA 1951	
9	Stanley C. Beck	Brigadier General; Stanley C. Beck	1975	1978	~3 years	USMA 1954	
10	Thomas C. Richards	Brigadier General; Thomas C. Richards	1978	1981	~3 years	Virginia Tech 1956	
11	Robert D. Beckel	Brigadier General; Robert D. Beckel	1981	1982	~1 year	USAFA 1959	(Note: First USAFA graduate Commandant. His son, Colonel Robert D. Beckel, Jr. was a cadet during his tenure.)
12	Anthony J. Burshnick	Brigadier General; Anthony J. Burshnick	1982	1984	~2 years	USAFA 1960	
13	Marcus A. Anderson	Brigadier General; Marcus A. Anderson	1984	1986	~2 years	USAFA 1961	(Note: Lieutenant General, fighter pilot, later became commander of Air Force Operational Test & Evaluation Center (AFOTEC), Inspector General US Air Force)
14	Sam W. Westbrook III	Brigadier General; Sam W. Westbrook III	1986	1989	~3 years	USAFA 1963	
15	Joseph J. Redden	Brigadier General; Joseph J. Redden	1989	1992	~3 years	USAFA 1964	
16	Richard C. Bethurem	Major General; Richard C. Bethurem	1992	1993	~1 year	USAFA 1966	
17	Patrick K. Gamble	Brigadier General; Patrick K. Gamble	1993	1994	~1 year	Texas A&M 1967	
18	John D. Hopper Jr.	Brigadier General; John D. Hopper Jr.	1994	1996	~2 years	USAFA 1969	(Note: First African American Commandant)
19	Stephen R. Lorenz	Brigadier General; Stephen R. Lorenz	1996	1999	~3 years	USAFA 1973	(Note: Retired Commander, Air Education and Training Command. Promoted to General Jul 2, 2008.)
20	Mark A. Welsh III	Brigadier General; Mark A. Welsh III	1999	2001	~3 years	USAFA 1976	(Note: Retired Chief of Staff, USAF. Promoted to General Dec 13, 2010.)
21	S. Taco Gilbert III	Brigadier General; S. Taco Gilbert III	2001	2003	~2 years	USAFA 1978	
22	Johnny A. Weida	Brigadier General; Johnny A. Weida	2003	2005	~2 years	USAFA 1978	
23	Susan Y. Desjardins	Brigadier General; Susan Y. Desjardins	2005	2008	~3 years	USAFA 1980	(Note: First female Commandant)
24	Samuel D. Cox	Brigadier General; Samuel D. Cox	2008	2010	~2 years	USAFA 1984	
25	Richard M. Clark	Brigadier General; Richard M. Clark	2010	2012	~2 years	USAFA 1986	(Note: B-1 bomber pilot. Promoted to Lt Gen Oct 21, 2016. Currently twenty-first superintendent of US Air Force Academy.)
26	Gregory J. Lengyel	Major General; Gregory J. Lengyel	2012	July 2, 2014	~2 years	Texas A&M 1985	(Note: BMajor General; helicopter pilot)
27	Stephen C. Williams	Brigadier General; Stephen C. Williams	July 2, 2014	~May 15, 2017	~2 years, 317 days	USAFA 1989	(Note: F-16C/D Pilot. Promoted to Major General Aug 3, 2018)
28	Kristin E. Goodwin	Brigadier General; Kristin E. Goodwin	May 15, 2017	April 29, 2019	1 year, 349 days	USAFA 1993	(Note: B-2A, B-52 Pilot)
29	Michele C. Edmondson	Major General; Michele C. Edmondson	May 31, 2019	May 27, 2021	1 year, 361 days	University of Florida 1992	(Note: First Commandant with a Space Warfare background)
30	Paul D. Moga	Brigadier General; Paul D. Moga	May 27, 2021	June 21, 2023	2 years, 25 days	USAFA 1995	
31	Gavin P. Marks	Brigadier General; Gavin P. Marks	June 21, 2023	Incumbent	3 years, 96 days	USAFA 1996	
