= Mark Welsh =

American general and university administrator (born 1954)

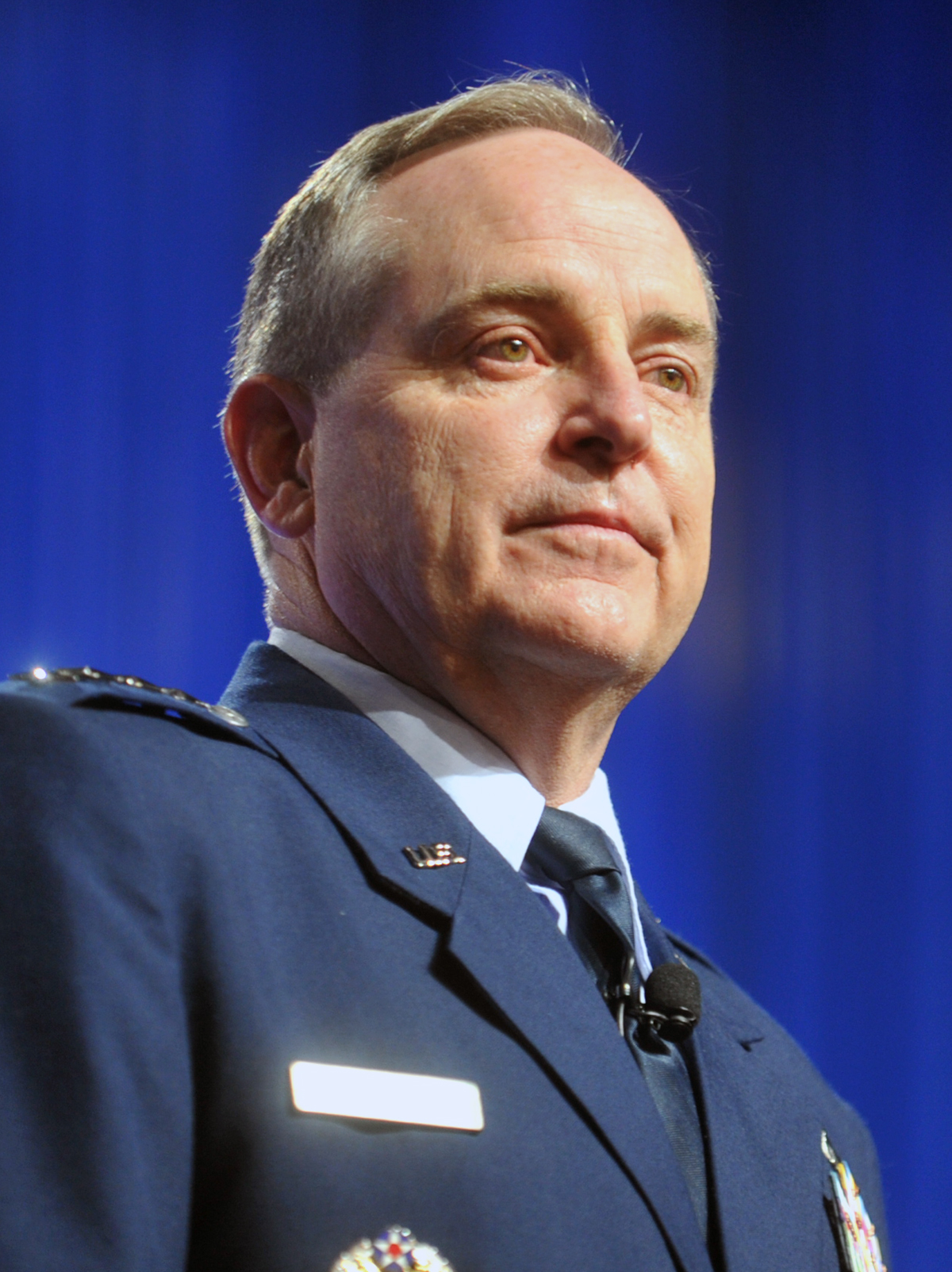
- Welsh as Chief of Staff of the Air Force in 2012

27th President of Texas A&M University
- In office July 21, 2023 – September 19, 2025 (Note: Welsh was the acting president from July 21, 2023 to July 30, 2023. He was the interim president from July 30, 2023 until he was named the 27th president of Texas A&M University on December 12, 2023. Welsh submitted his resignation as president on September 18, 2025, and his final day as president was September 19, 2025.)
- Preceded by: M. Katherine Banks
- Succeeded by: Susan Ballabina

Dean of the Bush School of Government and Public Service
- In office August 15, 2016 – July 20, 2023
- Preceded by: Ryan Crocker
- Succeeded by: Frank Ashley (acting)

20th Chief of Staff of the United States Air Force
- In office 10 August 2012 – 24 June 2016
- President: Barack Obama
- Preceded by: Norton A. Schwartz
- Succeeded by: David L. Goldfein

Personal details
- Born: Mark Anthony Welsh III; January 26, 1954 (age 72) San Antonio, Texas, U.S.
- Spouse: Betty
- Children: 4
- Education: United States Air Force Academy (BS); Webster University (MS)
- Call sign: "Boomer"

Military service
- Allegiance: United States
- Branch/service: United States Air Force
- Years of service: 1976–2016
- Rank: General
- Commands: Chief of Staff of the United States Air Force
- Battles/wars: Gulf War; War on terrorism
- Awards: Defense Distinguished Service Medal (3); Air Force Distinguished Service Medal (2); Defense Superior Service Medal (2); Legion of Merit (2); Distinguished Flying Cross (2); Meritorious Service Medal (3); Air Medal (2); Full list

Mark Anthony Welsh III (born January 26, 1954) is a retired United States Air Force four-star general and a member of the board of directors of Northrop Grumman. He was the 27th president of Texas A&M University, and is a former dean of its Bush School of Government & Public Service. Welsh was appointed by Barack Obama to serve as Chief of Staff of the United States Air Force, and was a member of the Joint Chiefs of Staff. Welsh was the commander of U.S. Air Forces in Europe, the associate director for Military Affairs of the Central Intelligence Agency, and the vice commander of Air Education and Training Command. In his early career, he served as a fighter pilot (primarily flying the F-16 and A-10 aircraft) and was a commander at the squadron, group, and wing level, in addition to assignments in training, operations, intelligence, and acquisitions. He was also the commandant of cadets of the United States Air Force Academy.

== Early life and education ==
He was born in San Antonio, Texas, as the son of Mark Anthony Welsh Jr., a veteran of World War II. Welsh attended Wentworth Military College in the early 1970s. He graduated from the United States Air Force Academy with a Bachelor of Science degree in 1976 and entered the Air Force. He graduated from the Air Command and Staff College in 1986 and graduated from Webster University with a master's degree in computer resource management in 1987. After obtaining his master's from Webster University, he graduated from the Army Command and General Staff College, the Air War College and the National War College. Welsh's other academic engagements include Seminar XXI at the Massachusetts Institute of Technology (1995 Fellow), National Securities Studies Program at Syracuse University and Johns Hopkins University (1998 Fellow), Ukrainian Securities Studies at John F. Kennedy School of Government at Harvard University (1999 Fellow), and the General Management Program at Harvard Business School (2002).

== Military career ==
Welsh's military career culminated in achieving the rank of general (four stars) and serving as the Chief of Staff of the United States Air Force and a member of the Joint Chiefs of Staff. He was appointed by President Barack Obama in May 2012, testified before the Senate Armed Services Committee in July 2012 and was confirmed shortly thereafter by the United States Senate. Welsh completed the customary four-year term for a "service chief," retiring in July 2016 after more than 40 years of military service.

During his tenure as a service chief, Welsh "wore two hats" as is customary for the role. As the chief of a military service, he was the senior-ranking uniformed officer within the service, responsible for the organizing, training and equipping of over 600,000 Air Force personnel, as well as related budgeting and planning functions, liaison with other services and agencies, and interaction with legislators and policymakers. Separately, as a member of the Joint Chiefs of Staff, he offered advice to the President, the Secretary of Defense, and the National Security Council.

Prior to his final assignment in Washington, Welsh served as the 34th Commander, U.S. Air Forces in Europe and Commander, Allied Air Command Ramstein, Germany, and Director, Joint Air Power Competence Center at Kalkar, Germany. He was responsible for Air Force activities in an area of operations covering almost one-fifth of the globe. This area includes 51 countries in Europe, Asia and the Middle East, and the Arctic and Atlantic oceans with a total population reaching nearly one billion people speaking more than 80 languages. He also had administrative control of the Air Force elements providing support, logistics and resources to U.S. Africa Command.

Welsh previously served as associate director of the Central Intelligence Agency (CIA) for Military Support and associate director for Military Affairs, Central Intelligence Agency, Washington, D.C. As the ADMA, he served as the principal advisor to the Director of the CIA on military matters and was the primary bridge between the CIA and the Department of Defense for the coordination and planning of military and interagency operations. Additionally, he assisted in the formulation of CIA policies regarding military affairs, managed the provision of direct support to deployed forces, and oversaw the Director of CIA representation at the combatant commands and senior service schools.

Prior to his role at the CIA, Welsh served as the Vice Commander of Air Education and Training Command, a major command of the Air Force responsible for the provision of training and professional education throughout the organization, comprising over 60,000 educators, researchers and related personnel across 12 major installations (schools).

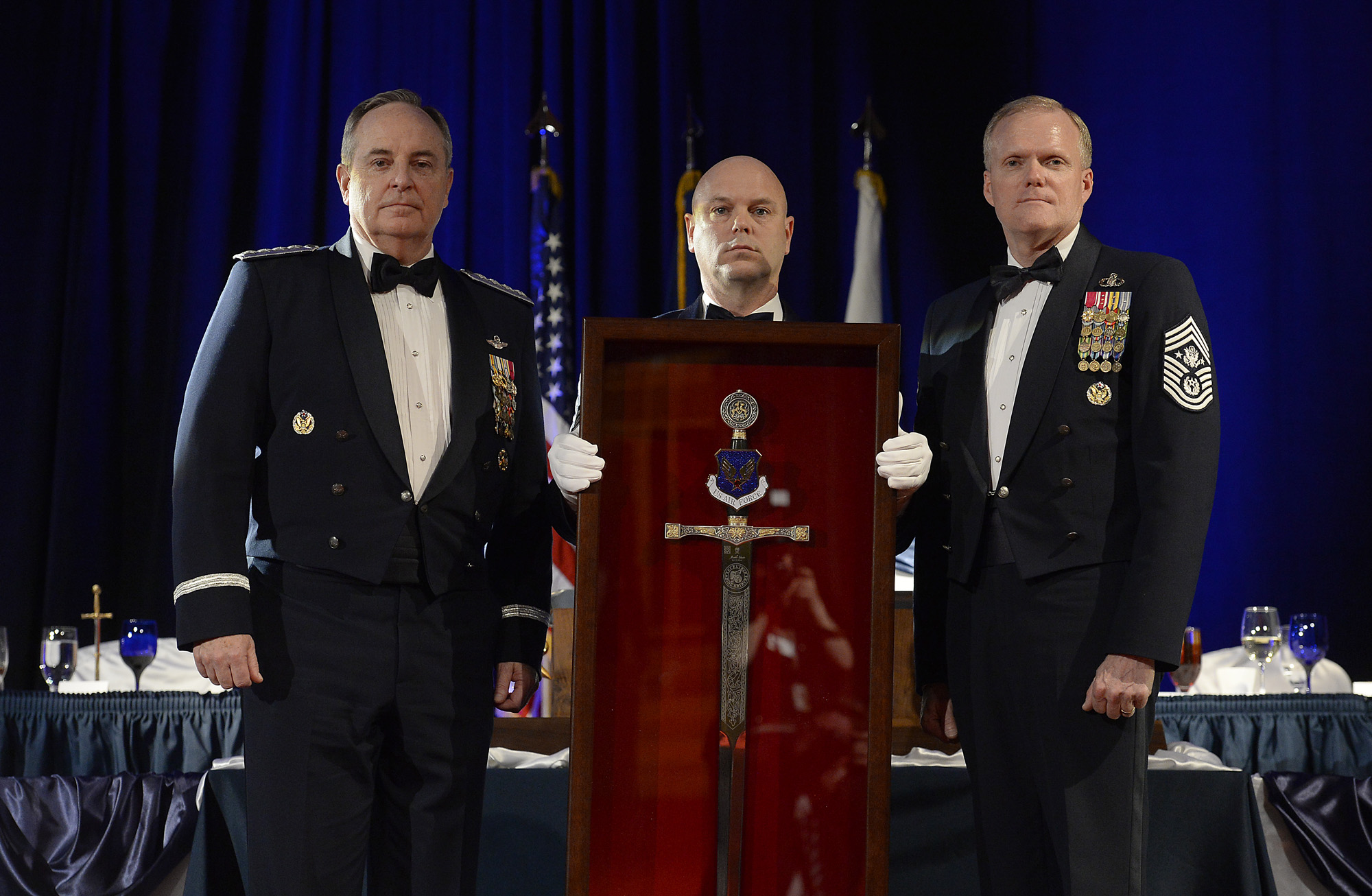
Chief Master Sgt. of the Air Force James A. Cody, right, presents the Order of the Sword to Air Force Chief of Staff Gen. Mark A. Welsh III, left, April 22, 2016. The Order of the Sword is the highest honor the enlisted corps can bestow to an individual. (U.S. Air Force photo/Scott M. Ash)

In earlier portions of his military career, Welsh was rated as a command pilot with extensive flying experience in fighter aircraft including the F-16 and the A-10. As an active fighter pilot, he was selected for command positions at the squadron, group and wing level, before progressing into more senior leadership roles. Throughout his career, Welsh has a total of 3,300 flying hours and has flown the F-16, A-10, T-37 and TG-7A.

== Civilian career ==
=== Dean of the Bush School ===
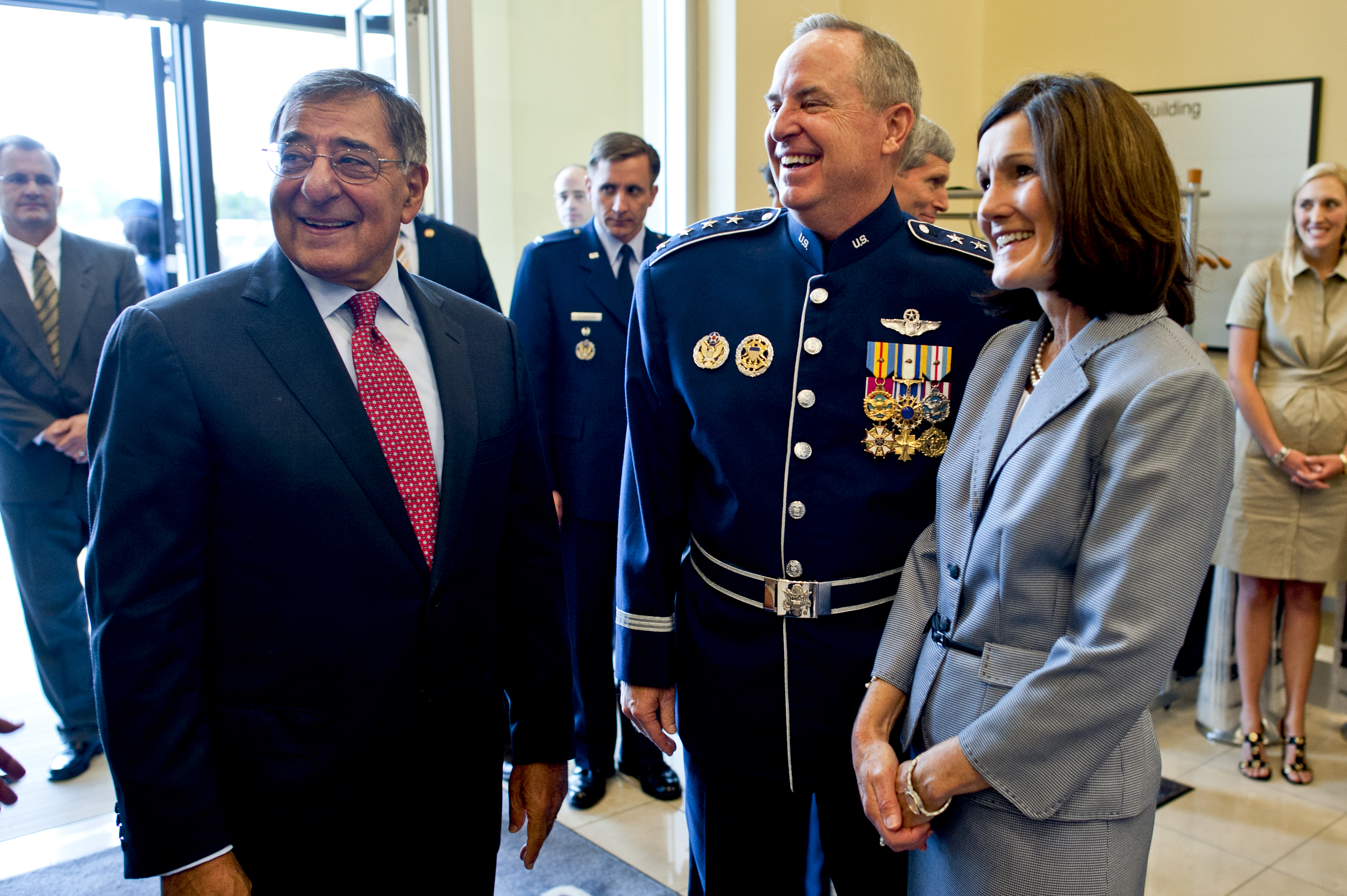
Defense Secretary Leon E. Panetta speaks with Air Force Gen. Mark A. Welsh III and his wife, Betty, at the ceremony where Welsh was sworn in as the 20th Chief of Staff of the United States Air Force, Joint Base Andrews, MD, Aug. 10, 2012. Department of Defense Image 120810-D-TT977-035. (U.S. Navy photo/Petty Officer 1st Class Chad J. McNeeley)

Following his retirement from the military in 2016, Welsh was appointed dean of the Bush School of Government & Public Service at Texas A&M University in College Station, Texas. He was recommended to fill the position by the president, Michael K. Young, provost and vice president, Karan L. Watson, and a search advisory committee. Welsh succeeded the former Bush School Dean, Ryan Crocker. Frank B. Ashley III was appointed acting dean of the school in August 2023 after Welsh became president of the university.

=== Northrop Grumman ===
On December 8, 2016, Northrop Grumman announced that it elected Welsh to its board of directors.

=== President of Texas A&M University ===
On July 21, 2023, Welsh was named acting president of Texas A&M University by Texas A&M University System Chancellor John Sharp following the resignation of M. Katherine Banks. Sharp also recommended for Welsh to continue as interim president until a search could be made to find Banks’ successor. He was named the interim president by the Texas A&M University System Board of Regents on July 30, 2023.

In his first official communication to students and faculty, Welsh made an indirect reference to the events surrounding the resignation of the previous president, which had involved the mishandled hiring of the journalism professor Kathleen McElroy:

[L]iving up to our core values is an ongoing commitment, as even esteemed institutions like ours must consistently confront and resolve challenges to uphold our status as a great university. Just to be clear on where I stand, I believe diversity in all its forms is a strength. I believe every Aggie must have a voice, that each of you is critically important to our success and that you deserve to be treated with respect. I think you also believe those things.

On November 17, 2023, Welsh was named the sole finalist for the position of President of Texas A&M University. He was unanimously approved by the Texas A&M University System Board of Regents as the 27th president on December 12, 2023.

==== September 2025 class video and resignation ====
In early September 2025, an unnamed Texas A&M University student was videotaped presenting an argument to professor Melissa McCoul, an English professor in a children's literature class, who was teaching. The student remarked "I'm not entirely sure this is legal to be teaching because according to our president, there's only two genders and he said he would be freezing agencies' funding programs that promote gender ideology. And this also very much goes against, not only myself but a lot of people's religious beliefs". A voice, believed to be the professor, says, "If you are uncomfortable in this class you do have the right to leave". The video was posted online by Brian Harrison, a member of the Texas House of Representatives. Harrison's posts also included undated audio recordings reportedly between the student and Welsh, in which the student told Welsh the professor should be fired and Welsh responded, "Well, that's not happening."

Welsh terminated McCoul's employment and later directed Mark Zoran, the dean of the College of Arts and Sciences, and Emily Johansen, the head of the English department, to be removed with support from Texas A&M University System Chancellor Glenn Hegar. He stated:

I learned this afternoon that key leaders in the College of Arts and Sciences approved plans to continue teaching course content that was not consistent with the course’s published description. As a result, I directed the provost to remove the dean and department head from their administrative positions, effective immediately. Our students use the published information in the course catalog to make important decisions about the courses they take in pursuit of their degrees. If we allow different course content to be taught from what is advertised, we let our students down. When it comes to our academic offerings, we must keep our word to our students and to the state of Texas.

Harmeet Dhillon, the United States Assistant Attorney General for Civil Rights at the Department of Justice stated that the department would conduct an investigation into the situation.

Welsh submitted his resignation as president of Texas A&M University on September 18, 2025, which took in effect the following day. His final day as president was September 19, 2025. Hundreds of students, faculty and staff gathered outside of the Jack K. Williams Administration Building to send of Welsh on his last day. The emotional send off included applause, cheers, and thank-you for his service. Two faculty committees subsequently found that McCoul's firing violated her academic freedom, was not based on an investigation, and did not follow university dismissal rules.

== Personal life ==
Welsh has four children with his wife Betty. Welsh has said that although he did not attend Texas A&M, he has a decades-long affinity for the university due to his father, children and various other family members attending the university, and considers himself an Aggie by association. In a keynote address at the on-campus Muster ceremony in 2022, Welsh provided elaborate detail regarding his affinity for the school, expounding on comments previously made in a Texas A&M Today interview and in other venues.

His father, Mark A. Welsh Jr., was a member of the Texas A&M Class of 1946 and left the campus (along with most of his classmates) to serve overseas in World War II before returning to complete his degree.

In addition to the connections of his father and children, Welsh said 5 of his siblings and 4 of his nieces and nephews attended the university. Welsh's sister Monica Marie “Mo” Welsh played on the university's golf team from 1978-1982. After graduating, she worked in professional golf before she died in an accident in 1992.

== Awards and decorations ==
Personal decorations
	Defense Distinguished Service Medal with two bronze oak leaf clusters
	Air Force Distinguished Service Medal with bronze oak leaf cluster
	Defense Superior Service Medal with bronze oak leaf cluster
Width-44 crimson ribbon with a pair of width-2 white stripes on the edges	Legion of Merit with bronze oak leaf cluster
	Distinguished Flying Cross with bronze oak leaf cluster
Width-44 crimson ribbon with two width-8 white stripes at distance 4 from the edges.	Meritorious Service Medal with two bronze oak leaf clusters
	Air Medal with bronze oak leaf cluster
	Aerial Achievement Medal
	Joint Service Commendation Medal
	Air Force Commendation Medal
Unit awards
	Joint Meritorious Unit Award
	Air Force Outstanding Unit Award with three bronze oak leaf clusters
	Air Force Organizational Excellence Award with one silver oak leaf cluster
Service Awards
	Combat Readiness Medal with two bronze oak leaf clusters
Campaign and service medals
Width=44 scarlet ribbon with a central width-4 golden yellow stripe, flanked by pairs of width-1 scarlet, white, Old Glory blue, and white stripes	National Defense Service Medal with two bronze service stars
	Southwest Asia Service Medal with bronze service star
	Global War on Terrorism Service Medal
	Korea Defense Service Medal
Service, training, and marksmanship awards
	Air Force Overseas Short Tour Service Ribbon
	Air Force Overseas Long Tour Service Ribbon with two bronze oak leaf clusters
	Air Force Longevity Service Award with one silver and three bronze oak leaf clusters
	Air Force Longevity Service Award (second ribbon to denote tenth award)
	Small Arms Expert Marksmanship Ribbon with bronze service star
	Air Force Training Ribbon
Foreign awards
	Legion of Honour, Knight (France)
	SICOFAA Legion of Merit, Grand Cross
	Kuwait Liberation Medal (Saudi Arabia)
	Kuwait Liberation Medal (Kuwait)

Other accoutrements
Command Air Force Pilot Badge
Office of the Joint Chiefs of Staff Identification Badge
Headquarters Air Force Badge

- In 2016, Welsh was named an honorary Tuskegee Airman. Also in 2016, on April 22, Welsh was inducted into the Order of the Sword, the highest honor bestowed on an officer by the Air Force enlisted corps.

== Effective dates of promotion ==
United States Air Force Academy Cadet – Class of 1976

Insignia	Rank	Date
	General	Dec. 13, 2010
	Lieutenant general	Dec. 9, 2008
	Major general	Aug. 1, 2003
	Brigadier general	Aug. 1, 2000
	Colonel	Feb. 1, 1994
	Lieutenant colonel	June 1, 1989
	Major	May 1, 1985
	Captain	June 2, 1980
	First lieutenant	June 2, 1978
	Second lieutenant	June 2, 1976

== See also ==
- Chief of Staff of the United States Air Force
- List of commanders of USAFE

Academic offices
Preceded by M. Katherine Banks	President of Texas A&M University; 2023–2025	Succeeded by Dr. James Hallmark (acting)
Preceded by Ryan Crocker	Dean of the Bush School of Government & Public Service; 2016–2023	Succeeded by Frank B. Ashley III (acting)
Military offices
Preceded by Norton Schwartz	Chief of Staff of the Air Force; 2012–2016	Succeeded by David L. Goldfein
Preceded by Roger Brady	Commander of United States Air Forces in Europe; 2010–2012	Succeeded by Philip Breedlove
Preceded by Stephen R. Lorenz	Commandant of Cadets of the United States Air Force Academy; 1999–2001	Succeeded by S. Taco Gilbert III
