= General Gilbert =

General Gilbert may refer to:

- Charles Champion Gilbert (1822–1903), Union Army brigadier general and acting major general
- Glyn Gilbert (1920–2003), British Army major general
- James Isham Gilbert (1823–1884), Union Army brigadier general and brevet major general
- S. Taco Gilbert III (born 1956), U.S. Air Force brigadier general
- Sir Walter Gilbert, 1st Baronet (1785–1853), British East India Company general

== See also ==
- Attorney General Gilbert (disambiguation)
