= Debra Lovette =

U.S. Air Force general

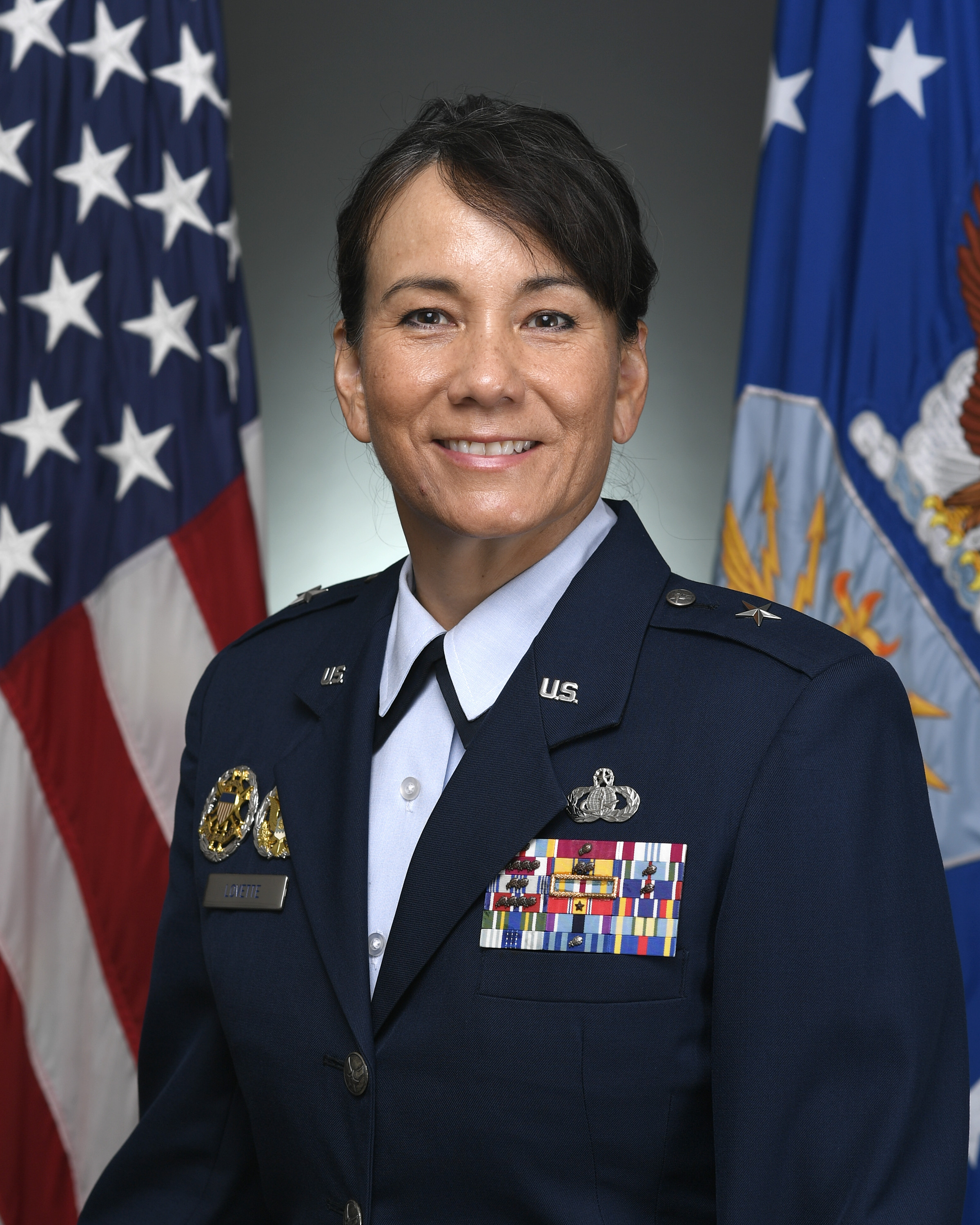
- Official portrait, 2021
- Born: Kinston, North Carolina, U.S.
- Military career
- Allegiance: United States
- Branch: United States Air Force
- Service years: 1994–present
- Rank: Brigadier General
- Commands: 81st Training Wing; 18th Mission Support Group; 4th Force Support Squadron
- Awards: Defense Superior Service Medal (2); Legion of Merit (3)

Debra Ann Lovette is a United States Air Force Brigadier General who has been director of the Department of the Air Force Integrated Resilience Office since July 2021. She previously commanded the 81st Training Wing.

Military offices
Preceded by Michele C. Edmondson	Commander of the 81st Training Wing; 2017–2019	Succeeded by Heather W. Blackwell
Preceded by Gentry W. Boswell	Director of Human Capital of the United States Space Command; 2019–2020	Succeeded by David L. Stanfield
Preceded by John R. Edwards	Director of the United States Secretary of the Air Force and Chief of Staff of the United States Air Force Executive Action Group; 2020–2021	Succeeded by Gavin P. Marks
Preceded by Michael E. Martin	Director of the Department of the Air Force Integrated Resilience Office; 2021–present	Incumbent
