= Paul Moga =

US Air Force Lieutenant general

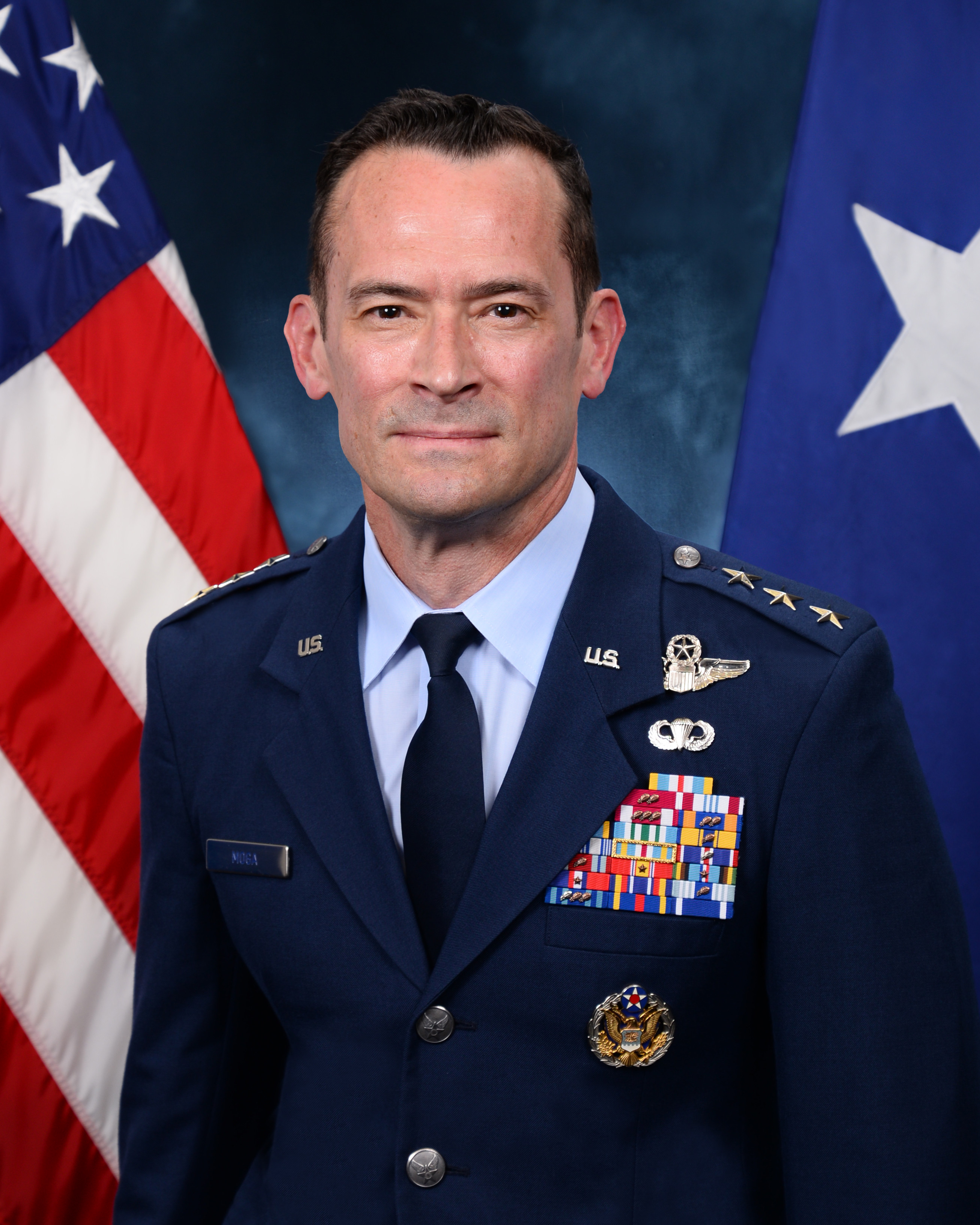
- Official portrait, 2026

Superintendent of the United States Air Force Academy
- Incumbent
- Assumed office 7 August 2026
- President: Donald Trump
- Preceded by: Tony Bauernfeind

Personal details
- Born: November 13, 1972 (age 53) Saint Paul, Minnesota, U.S.
- Education: United States Air Force Academy (BS); Auburn University (MBA)
- Awards: Defense Superior Service Medal (3); Legion of Merit (2)

Military service
- Allegiance: United States
- Branch/service: United States Air Force
- Years of service: 1995–present
- Rank: Lieutenant General
- Commands: United States Air Force Academy; Third Air Force; Commandant of Cadets, U.S. Air Force Academy; 33rd Fighter Wing; 525th Fighter Squadron
- Battles/wars: NATO bombing of Yugoslavia; Iraq War

Paul Daniel Moga (born November 13, 1972) is a United States Air Force lieutenant general who has served as the 23rd superintendent of the United States Air Force Academy since August 7, 2026. Moga served as the commander of Third Air Force from April 3, 2024. He most recently served as chief of staff of United States Air Forces in Europe – Air Forces Africa from 2023 to 2024. He previously served as the Commandant of Cadets of the United States Air Force Academy from 2021 to 2023, and as the deputy director for operations of the United States Northern Command. In May 2026, he was nominated for assignment as superintendent of the United States Air Force Academy. He began this assignment on August 7, 2026.

Moga was also the host of American Heroes Channel (formerly named the Military Channel) Television shows Showdown: Air Combat and Great Planes.

== Early life ==
Paul Moga was born in Saint Paul, Minnesota, on November 13, 1972, and lived in the Saint Paul suburb of North Oaks, Minnesota. He attended Cretin-Derham Hall High School, graduating in May 1991. After high school, Moga attended the United States Air Force Academy and graduated with the Class of 1995.

== Military career ==
After graduating from the Air Force Academy, Paul Moga remained at the Academy on casual status until he attended Joint Specialized Undergraduate Pilot Training at Laughlin Air Force Base, Texas. He graduated as the Distinguished Graduate, Academic Award, Flying Award and AETC Commander's Trophy recipient. Moga then attended Introduction to Fighter Fundamentals at Columbus Air Force Base, Mississippi, and F-15 Eagle Formal Training Unit (FTU) at Tyndall Air Force Base, Florida Upon graduation, he was then assigned to Elmendorf Air Force Base, Alaska, for three years. Following that assignment, Moga moved back to Tyndall Air Force base to serve as an F-15C FTU Instructor Pilot where he taught for four years. During that time, he attended Squadron Officer School at Maxwell Air Force Base, Alabama, and received Distinguished Graduate honors.

Moga was one of thirteen pilots Air Force-wide accepted into the F-22A Raptor program as initial FTU IP cadre in the 43rd Fighter Squadron at Tyndall AFB. He was the 43rd Fighter Squadron Flight Commander of the year in 2005 and the 325th Fighter Wing Lance P. Sijan Award nominee for 2006. In February 2006 he was selected to be the first F-22 Demonstration Pilot and moved to Langley Air Force Base in August of that year.

Between May 2011 and June 2012, Moga was an F-22 Evaluator and Commander of the 525th Fighter Squadron flying out of Joint Base Elmendorf-Richardson, Alaska. Between June 2012 and February 2013, he was a student at the NATO Defense College in Rome, Italy. After graduating from the NATO defense college, he became the Executive Officer to the Chief of Staff of the U.S. European Command, in Stuttgart, Germany until June 2015 when he was assigned as the Vice Commander of the 80th Flying Training Wing. Moga would serve as a vice wing commander until April 2017 when he became the commander of the 33rd Fighter Wing. Moga commanded the 33rd Fighter Wing for over two years between April 2017 and June 2019. In June 2019, then Colonel Moga became the Strategic Planning and Integration Division Chief, for Headquarters U.S. Air Force A8, at the Pentagon. Moga eventually became the Deputy Director for Operations of the United States Northern Command after 13 months at the pentagon in July 2020. Moga has over 2,600 flying hours in fighter aircraft and over 250 combat hours over Yugoslavia and Iraq.

In March 2023, Moga was nominated for promotion to major general with assignment as chief of staff of United States Air Forces in Europe - Air Forces Africa. His nomination was among those under a hold by Senator Eric Schmitt in relation to DEI programs in the military.

== Awards and decorations ==
Personal decorations
	Defense Superior Service Medal
Width-44 crimson ribbon with a pair of width-2 white stripes on the edges	Legion of Merit with one bronze oak leaf cluster
	Defense Meritorious Service Medal
	Meritorious Service Medal with three bronze oak leaf clusters
	Air Medal with two bronze oak leaf clusters
	Aerial Achievement Medal
	Joint Service Commendation Medal
	Air Force Commendation Medal with oak leaf cluster
	Air Force Achievement Medal
Unit awards
	Joint Meritorious Unit Award
	Air Force Outstanding Unit Award with one silver oak leaf cluster
Service Awards
	Combat Readiness Medal with one bronze oak leaf cluster
Campaign and service medals
	National Defense Service Medal with one service star
	Armed Forces Expeditionary Medal with one service star
	Kosovo Campaign Medal with one service star
	Global War on Terrorism Service Medal
Service and training awards
	Air Force Overseas Long Tour Service Ribbon with one bronze oak leaf cluster
	Air Force Longevity Service Award with one silver and one bronze oak leaf cluster
	Air Force Training Ribbon
Foreign awards
	NATO Medal for Former Yugoslavia

Other accoutrements
US Air Force Command Pilot Badge
Headquarters Air Force Badge

== Effective dates of promotion ==
Rank	Date
Second lieutenant	May 31, 1995
First lieutenant	May 31, 1997
Captain	May 31, 1999
Major	July 1, 2005
Lieutenant colonel	March 1, 2009
Colonel	June 1, 2015
Brigadier general	December 2, 2020
Major general	December 05, 2023
Lieutenant general	August 7, 2026

Military offices
Preceded by Lansing Pilch	Commander of the 33rd Fighter Wing; 2017–2019	Succeeded by Jon S. Wheeler Jr.
Preceded by Michele C. Edmondson	Commandant of Cadets of the United States Air Force Academy; 2021–2023	Succeeded by Gavin P. Marks
Preceded by Brian S. Laidlaw	Chief of Staff of United States Air Forces in Europe – Air Forces Africa; 2023–2024	Succeeded by Otis C. Jones
Preceded by Derek France	Commander of Third Air Force; 2024–2026	Succeeded by Vacant
Preceded by Tony Bauernfeind	23nd Superintendent of the United States Air Force Academy; 2026–present	Incumbent
