= Walter T. Galligan =

United States Air Force general

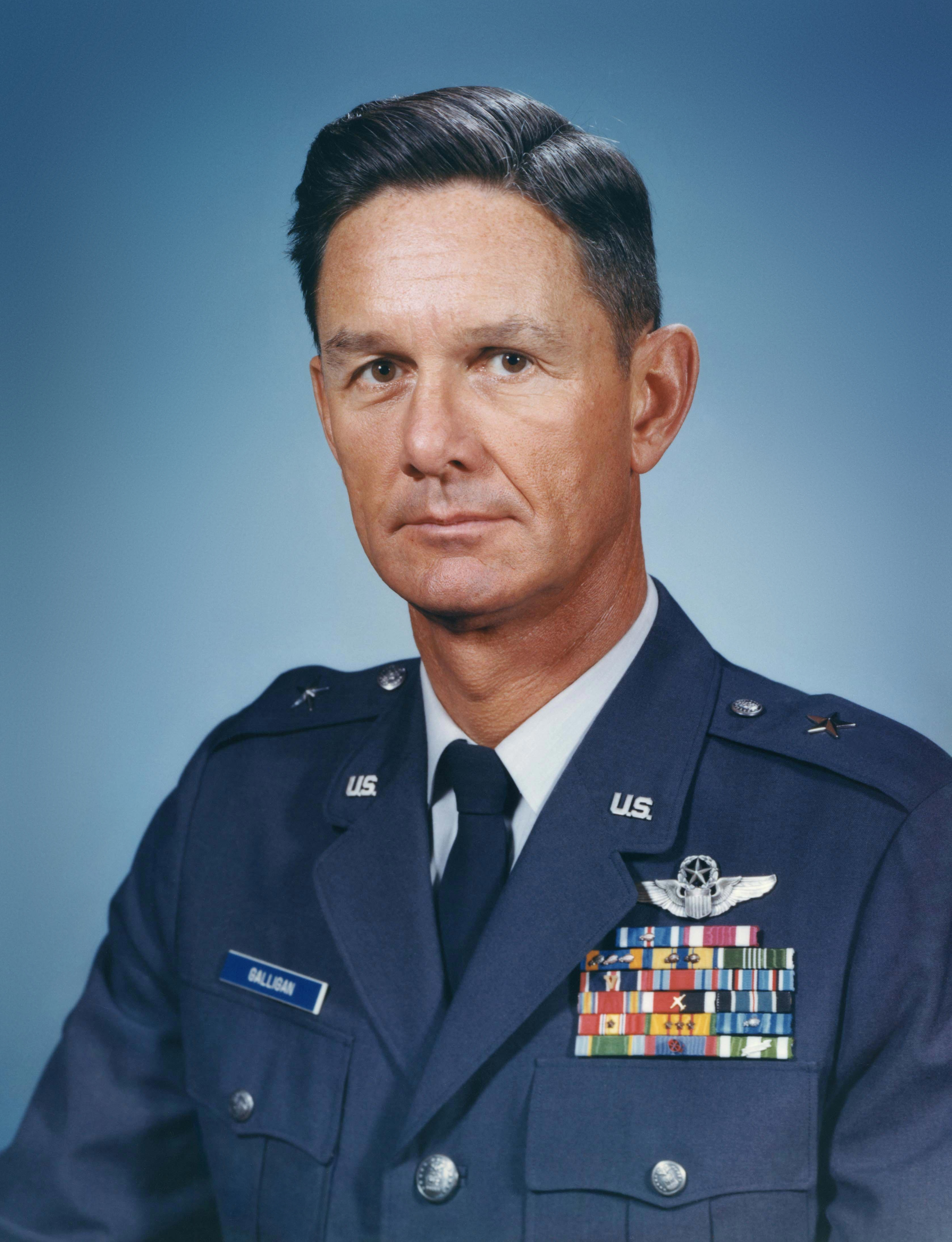
- Walter T. Galligan pictured as a brigadier general, c. early 1970s
- Born: March 14, 1925; Bronx, New York
- Died: December 22, 2010 (aged 85); Universal City, Texas
- Military career
- Allegiance: United States
- Branch: United States Air Force
- Service years: 1945–1977
- Rank: Lieutenant General
- Commands: United States Forces Japan; Fifth Air Force; United States Air Force Security Service; 35th Tactical Fighter Wing
- Conflicts: World War II; Vietnam War
- Awards: Air Force Distinguished Service Medal (3); Distinguished Flying Cross (2)

Walter Turbush Galligan (March 14, 1925 – December 22, 2010) was a United States Air Force lieutenant general who served as commander United States Forces Japan and Fifth Air Force, with headquarters at Yokota Air Base, Japan. As commander, he was the senior United States military representative in Japan and responsible for the conduct of United States air operations in Japan and the Republic of Korea.

== Early life and education ==
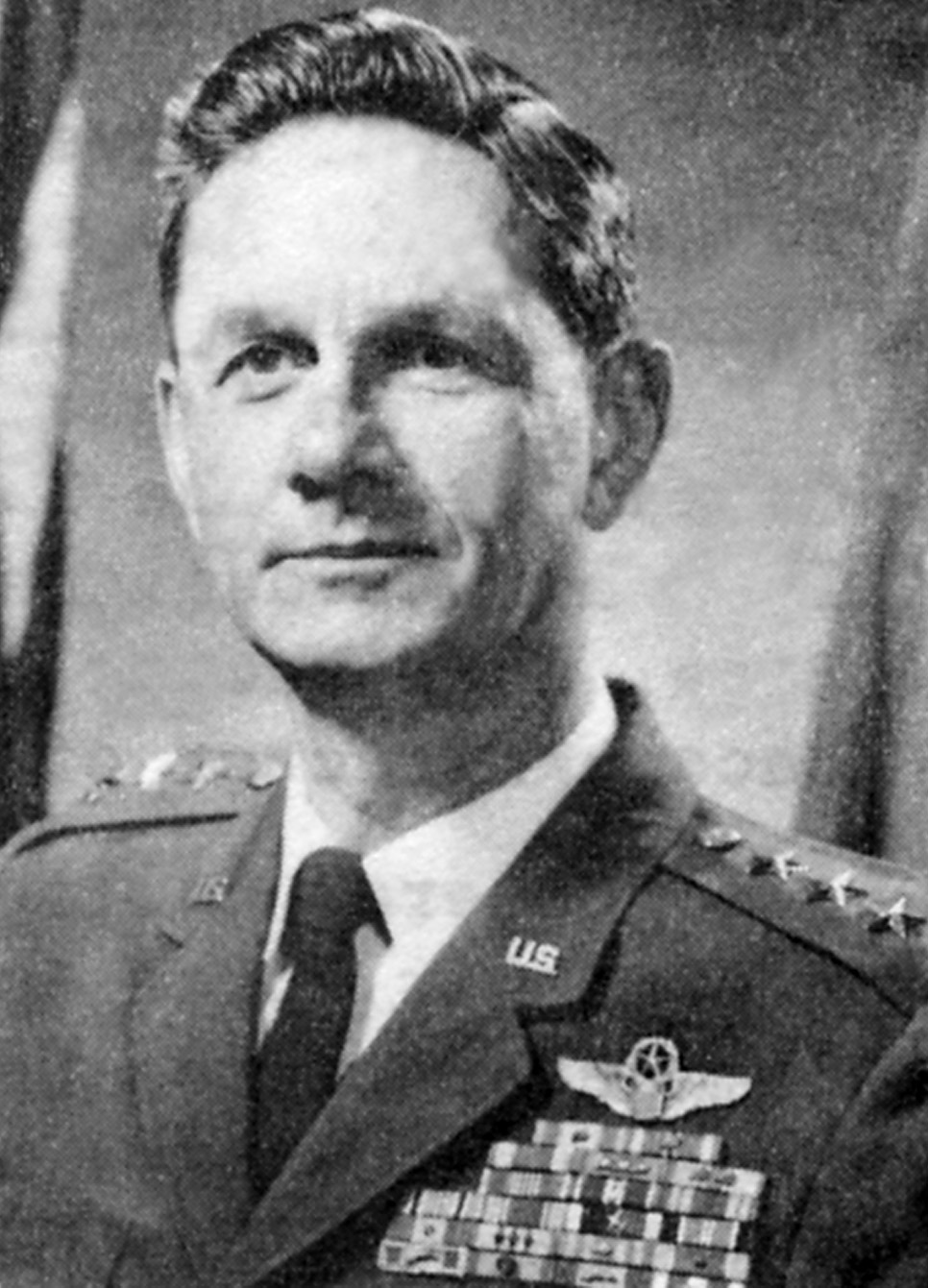
Galligan as Lieutenant General

Galligan was born on March 14, 1925, in Bronx, New York, where he graduated from St. Michael's Academy in 1942. He graduated from the United States Military Academy, West Point, in 1945 with a Bachelor of Science, his pilot wings, and commission as second lieutenant. Later that same year, he qualified as a pilot in B-17 and B-25 aircraft and in 1946, completed Junior Staff Officer Course.

== Military career ==
In March 1946 Galligan went to Tullin Air Base, Vienna, Austria, where he became the legal officer and base adjutant. During the Berlin airlift, 1948–1949, Galligan piloted C-47 aircraft between Wiesbaden Air Base, Germany, and Tempelhof Airport, Berlin.

Galligan returned to the United States in March 1949 and served as squadron adjutant in the 78th Fighter Wing, Hamilton Air Force Base, California, for five months. He then became a student at the Central Instructors School at Vance Air Force Base, Oklahoma, where from August 1949 to August 1951 he served as an instructor in T-6, T-28 and B-25 aircraft. In August 1951 he entered the U.S. Air Force Institute of Technology Program at Wright-Patterson Air Force Base, Ohio, where he received his Master of Science degree in industrial administration in 1953. He completed transition training in B-29 aircraft at Randolph Air Force Base, Texas, in October 1953.

Galligan then transferred to Schilling Air Force Base, Kansas, as a B-29 aircraft commander with the 40th Bombardment Wing; became a B-47 aircraft commander in 1954; and moved with the wing to Forbes Air Force Base, Kan., in 1961 as the assistant deputy commander for operations.

Following graduation from the Armed Forces Staff College, Norfolk, Virginia, in February 1963, Galligan was assigned to the Office of Legislative Liaison, Office of the Secretary of the Air Force, as assistant for program control and administration and later was deputy chief, Congressional Investigation Division. In 1965 he attended the six-week advanced management program at Harvard Business School, and from August 1966 to July 1967, attended the Industrial College of the Armed Forces, Washington, D.C.

Galligan next served as vice commander of the 401st Tactical Fighter Wing, Torrejon Air Base, Spain. In August 1968 he went to Lindsey Air Station, Germany, as the director of operations, United States Air Forces in Europe. In August 1969 he transferred to the Republic of Vietnam as commander of the 35th Tactical Fighter Wing at Phan Rang Air Base. In June 1970 he was assigned to Headquarters Seventh Air Force, Tan Son Nhut Air Base, as director of the Tactical Air Control Center and in October 1970 became director of combat operations.

Galligan assumed the duties of commandant of cadets, United States Air Force Academy, Colorado, in February 1971. He was assigned as commander of the United States Air Force Security Service in February 1973. He assumed duties as commander of U.S. Forces, Japan, and Fifth Air Force in May 1974.

Galligan's military decorations and awards include the Air Force Distinguished Service Medal with two oak leaf clusters, Distinguished Flying Cross with oak leaf cluster, Meritorious Service Medal, Air Medal with seven oak leaf clusters, Air Force Commendation Medal with two oak leaf clusters, Army Commendation Medal, Air Force Outstanding Unit Award Ribbon with "V" device, Combat Readiness Medal, and the Medal for Humane Action. He was awarded by the Republic of Vietnam, the Air Force Distinguished Service Order, First Class, and the Military Cross of Gallantry with palm. He was a command pilot.
