= Richard C. Bethurem =

American lieutenant general

Richard C. Berthurem
- Born: January 24, 1943 (age 83); Green Bay, Wisconsin, U.S.
- Military career
- Allegiance: United States of America
- Branch: United States Air Force
- Service years: 1966–1998
- Rank: Lieutenant General

Richard C. Berthurem (born January 24, 1943) is a retired lieutenant general of the United States Air Force. He was the commander of Allied Air Forces Southern Europe, Naples, Italy; commander of 16th Air Force, United States Air Forces in Europe and Aviano Air Base in Italy. He was the air principal subordinate commander and the joint and combined forces air component commander for the North Atlantic Treaty Organization's (NATO) Southern Region. He was responsible for the planning and employment of NATO's air forces in the Mediterranean area of operations from Gibraltar to Eastern Turkey, and was the commander of air operations in Bosnia-Herzegovina. He is also a former Commandant of Cadets at the USAF Academy.

Berthurem entered the Air Force in 1966 after graduating from the U.S. Air Force Academy, Colorado Springs, Colorado. He commanded the 461st Fighter Squadron, Luke Air Force Base, Ariz.; 49th Fighter Wing, Holloman Air Force Base, N.M.; 831st Air Division, George Air Force Base, California; 4404th Composite Wing, Dhahran Air Base, Saudi Arabia; and the Air Warfare Center, Nellis Air Force Base, Nevada. He is a command pilot, having flown more than 4,300 hours in F-4, F-104, F-15 and F-16 aircraft, with 385 combat missions in Southeast Asia.

His awards include the Distinguished Service Medal, Legion of Merit, Distinguished Flying Cross with two oak leaf clusters, Meritorious Service Medal with two oak leaf clusters, Air Medal with 21 oak leaf clusters, Aerial Achievement Medal, Air Force Commendation Medal, Vietnam Service Medal with eight service stars, and the Republic of Vietnam Gallantry Cross with Palm.
