= Attorney General Gilbert =

Attorney General Gilbert may refer to:

- Frank L. Gilbert (1864–1930), Attorney General of Wisconsin
- Joseph Trounsell Gilbert (1888–1975), Attorney General of Bermuda

== See also ==
- General Gilbert (disambiguation)
