= Sam W. Westbrook III =

US Air Force major general

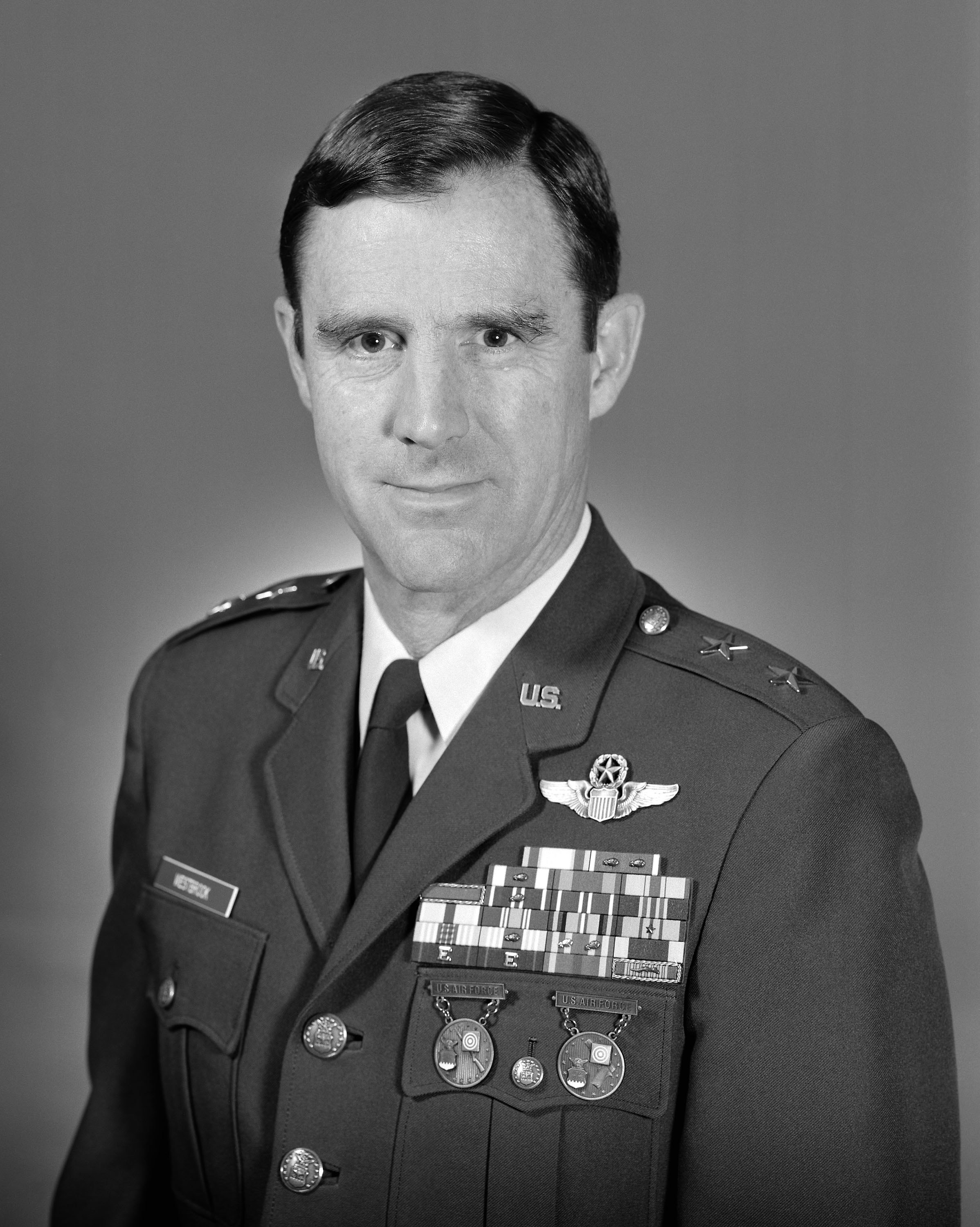
- Born: April 8, 1941 (age 85); Orlando, Florida, U.S.
- Military career
- Allegiance: United States of America
- Branch: United States Air Force
- Service years: 1963–1991
- Rank: Major General

Sam W. Westbrook III (born April 8, 1941) is a retired major general in the United States Air Force (USAF).

Westbrook was born in 1941, in Orlando, Florida, and graduated from Grandview (Missouri) High School in 1959. He earned a bachelor of science degree from the U.S. Air Force Academy in 1963. Westbrook then spent three years as a Rhodes scholar at Trinity College, Oxford, England, achieving a bachelor of arts-master of arts honours degree and an Oxford bachelor of science degree in plasma physics. He completed Armed Forces Staff College in 1972 and National War College in 1980. Upon graduation from the Air Force Academy in June 1963, he was commissioned as a second lieutenant in the USAF. After completing his Rhodes scholarship program in August 1966, he entered pilot training at Williams Air Force Base, Arizona. In March 1968 he was assigned to the 428th Tactical Fighter Squadron, Nellis Air Force Base, Nevada, as an F-111 Aardvark pilot. He later served as an F-111 aircraft commander and as a weapons and tactics officer.

Westbrook completed Armed Forces Staff College in January 1972. He then attended the AT-37 and A-1 checkout programs in preparation for his assignment to the 1st Special Operations Squadron at Nakhom Phanom Royal Thai Air Force Base, Thailand. He next served as a plans and programs action officer, Headquarters 13th Air Force, Clark Air Base, Philippines. Westbrook returned to Nellis Air Force Base in September 1973 and served with the 422nd Fighter Weapons Squadron as chief of the F-111 Operational Test and Evaluation Section. In September 1975 he was assigned to Headquarters U.S. Air Force, Washington, D.C., as an action officer in the Directorate of Plans, Office of the Deputy Chief of Staff, Plans and Operations. He worked with National Security Council staff from October 1977 until July 1978, when he became the first chief of the Staff Group, Office of the Assistant Vice Chief of Staff.

After completing National War College in June 1980, Westbrook was appointed deputy commander for operations, 20th Tactical Fighter Wing, Royal Air Force Station Upper Heyford, England. He transferred to Ramstein Air Base, West Germany, in August 1982 as director of inspection for U.S. Air Forces in Europe. In July 1983 he was assigned as vice commander, 48th Tactical Fighter Wing, Royal Air Force Station Lakenheath, England, and became commander of the wing in April 1984. In April 1986, he supervised the 48th Wing during their role in the April 1986 bombing of Libya, which was codenamed Operation El Dorado Canyon. He advocated for a smaller strike force, and turned out to be correct as only two of nine aircraft deployed by the 48th Wing could bomb their targets. In June 1986 he was named commandant of cadets, Air Force Academy, Colorado, succeeding Marcus A. Anderson. He served as commandant till 1989, when he was succeeded in the role by Joseph J. Redden.

He is a command pilot with more than 2,300 flying hours, including 22 combat missions. His military decorations and awards include the Distinguished Service Medal, Legion of Merit with two oak leaf clusters, Meritorious Service Medal with oak leaf cluster, Air Medal and Air Force Commendation Medal. He was promoted to major general on August 1, 1989, with same date of rank and retired on June 1, 1991.
