= Gavin Marks =

U.S. Air Force general

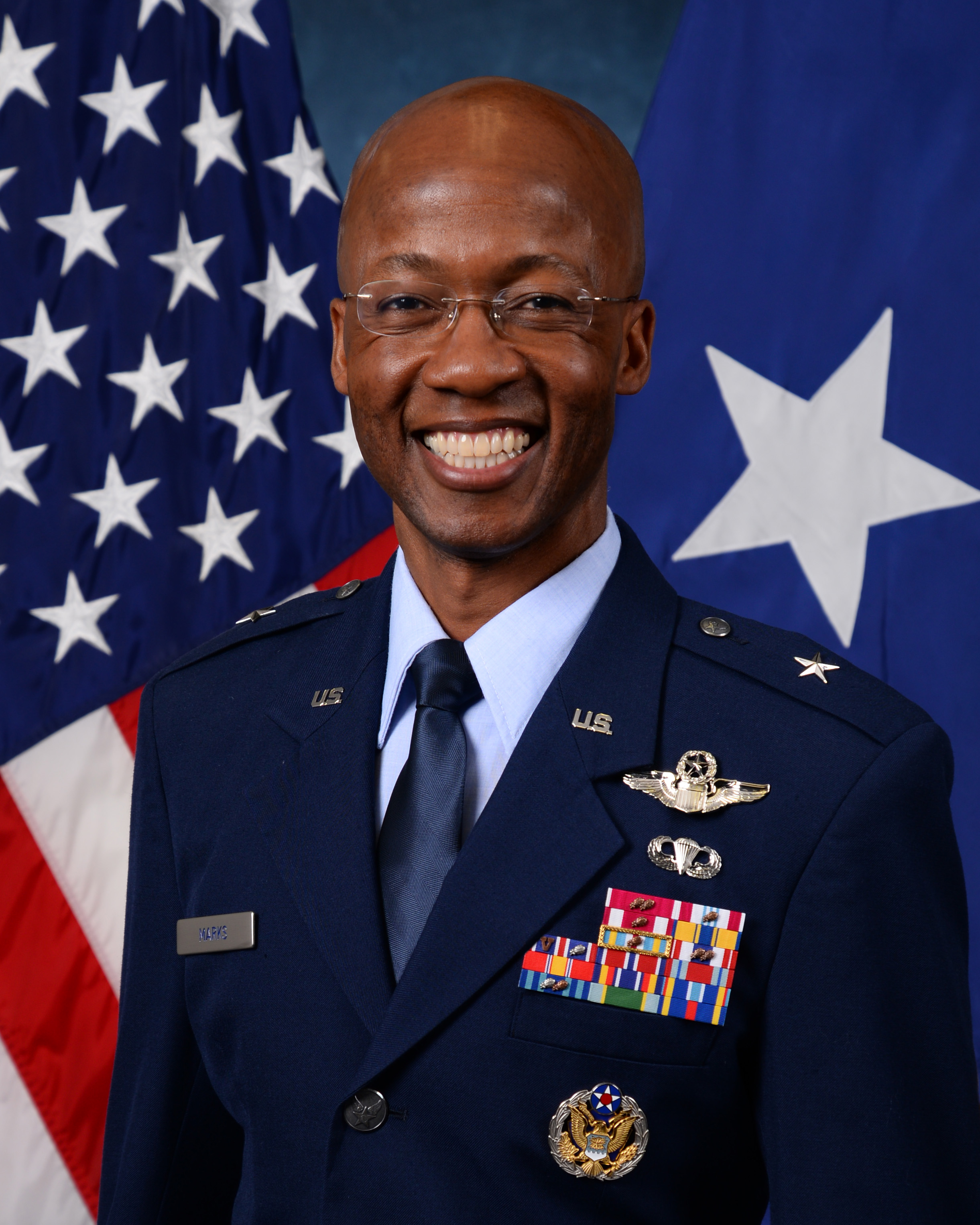
- Education: United States Air Force Academy (BS); George Washington University (MS)
- Military career
- Branch: United States Air Force
- Service years: 1996–present
- Rank: Brigadier General
- Commands: Commandant of Cadets of USAFA; 55th Wing; 99th Flying Training Squadron
- Awards: Legion of Merit (3); Defense Meritorious Service Medal (2); Meritorious Service Medal (2); Air Force Commendation Medal (2)

Gavin P. Marks is a United States Air Force brigadier general who served as the Commandant of Cadets of the United States Air Force Academy from 2023 to 2026. He previously served as Director, Secretary, and Chief of Staff of the Air Force Executive Action Group.

== Early life ==
Marks attended the United States Air Force Academy and graduated with the Class of 1996. In 2002, he obtained a Master of Science in organizational management from George Washington University. Later, in 2015 he received a Master of Science in National Security Strategy from the National War College.

== Military career ==
After graduating from the Air Force Academy, Marks attended Joint Specialized Undergraduate Pilot Training at Columbus Air Force Base, Mississippi. Marks then attended Pilot Instructor Training at Randolph Air Force Base, Texas, and graduated top of his class. Afterwards, he moved to Vance Air Force Base, Oklahoma, to serve as an T-1A Instructor Pilot with the 32nd Flying Training Squadron. During that time, he attended Squadron Officer School at Maxwell Air Force Base, Alabama, and received Distinguished Graduate honors.

Between May 2012 and 2014, Marks commanded the 99th Flying Training Squadron flying out of Randolph Air Force Base, Texas. He attended the National War College in Washington, D.C., where he received both distinguished graduate honors and the Dean's Award. He served as Vice Commander of the 552d Air Control Wing at Tinker Air Force Base, Oklahoma, from July 2017 to June 2019.

Between June 2019 and 2021, he served as commander of the 55th Wing, out of Offutt Air Force Base, Nebraska. After that assignment, he served as Director of SECAF/CSAF Executive Action Group, at the Pentagon, in Arlington, Virginia. In May 2022, he was promoted to the rank of brigadier general.

In June 2023, Marks became the 31st Commandant of Cadets of the United States Air Force Academy, succeeding Paul Moga. He has over 3,400 flying hours. His significant accomplishments as Commandant include culture and morale of cadets and instituting discipline. Some of his notable command decisions include taking away flight suits, restricting cadets to base, increasing the amount of military formations, and instituting mandatory social decorum dinners for cadets.

In May 2026, Marks will retire from the Air Force and will be succeeded by Colonel Brandon Tellez as Commandant of Cadets.

== Awards and decorations ==
Personal decorations
Width-44 crimson ribbon with a pair of width-2 white stripes on the edges	Legion of Merit with two bronze oak leaf clusters
	Defense Meritorious Service Medal with oak leaf cluster
	Meritorious Service Medal with oak leaf cluster
	Air Force Commendation Medal
Unit awards
	Joint Meritorious Unit Award with oak leaf cluster
	Meritorious Unit Award with two bronze oak leaf clusters
	Air and Space Outstanding Unit Award with "V" Device and one bronze oak leaf cluster
	Air and Space Organizational Excellence Award
Service Awards
	Combat Readiness Medal
Campaign and service medals
Width=44 scarlet ribbon with a central width-4 golden yellow stripe, flanked by pairs of width-1 scarlet, white, Old Glory blue, and white stripes	National Defense Service Medal
	Global War on Terrorism Service Medal
Service and training awards
	Air and Space Expeditionary Service Ribbon
	Air Force Longevity Service Award with one silver and one bronze oak leaf cluster
	Marksmanship ribbon
	Air Force Training Ribbon

Other accoutrements
US Air Force Command Pilot Badge
Parachutist Badge
Headquarters Air Force Badge

== Effective dates of promotion ==
Insignia	Rank	Date of rank
	Second Lieutenant	May 29, 1996
	First Lieutenant	May 29, 1998
	Captain	May 29, 2000
	Major	May 1, 2006
	Lieutenant Colonel	December 1, 2010
	Colonel	March 1, 2017
	Brigadier General	June 2, 2023

== Assignments ==
- 1. July 1996–February 1997, Assistant Executive Officer / Special Projects Officer, 34th Training Wing, United States Air Force Academy, Colo.
- 2. February 1997–February 1998, Student, Specialized UPT, Columbus Air Force Base, Miss.
- 3. February 1998–July 1998, Student, Pilot Instructor Training, Randolph AFB, Texas
- 4. July 1998–May 2001, T-1A Instructor Pilot, Squadron Programmer, Check Pilot, 32nd Flying Training Squadron, Vance AFB, Okla.
- 5. June 2001–June 2002, Air Force Intern, the Pentagon, Arlington Va.
- 6. July 2002–July 2004, Assistant Flight Commander, E-3 Aircraft Commander, 963rd Airborne Air Control Squadron, Tinker AFB, Okla.
- 7. July 2004–March 2005, Flight Commander, E-3 Instructor Pilot, 963rd Airborne Air Control Squadron, Tinker AFB, Okla.
- 8. March 2005–September 2006, Wing Executive Officer, E-3 Instructor Pilot, 552nd Air Control Wing, Tinker AFB, Okla.
- 9. September 2006–November 2007, assistant director of Operations, E-3 Evaluator Pilot, 964th Airborne Air Control Squadron, Tinker AFB, Okla.
- 10. November 2007–June 2010, Observer / Trainer, J7 Joint Warfighting Center, United States Joint Forces Command, Suffolk, Va.
- 11. June 2010–May 2012, Director of Operations, 99th Flying Training Squadron, Randolph AFB, Texas
- 12. May 2012–May 2014, Commander, 99th Flying Training Squadron, Randolph AFB, Texas
- 13. May 2014–June 2015, Student, National War College, Ft McNair, Washington, D.C.
- 14. June 2015–June 2016, Executive Officer, Joint Functional Component Command for Intelligence, Surveillance & Reconnaissance, U.S. Strategic Command, Joint Base Anacostia-Bolling, Washington, D.C.
- 15. June 2016–July 2017, Operations Planner, Force Management Division, J-32 ISR / CCA, Joint Staff, the Pentagon, Arlington Va.
- 16. July 2017–June 2019, Vice Commander, 552nd Air Control Wing, Tinker AFB, Okla.
- 17. June 2019–June 2021, Commander, 55th Wing, Offutt AFB, Neb.
- 18. June 2021–June 2022, Director, SECAF / CSAF Executive Action Group, Headquarters Air Force, the Pentagon, Arlington Va.
- 19. June 2022–June 2023, Director, Electromagnetic Spectrum Superiority, Headquarters Air Force, the Pentagon, Arlington Va.
- 20. June 2023–May 2026, Commandant of Cadets, United States Air Force Academy, Colo.

Military offices
Preceded by Paul Moga	Commandant of Cadets of the United States Air Force Academy; 2023–present	Incumbent
