= Michele C. Edmondson =

U.S. Air Force general

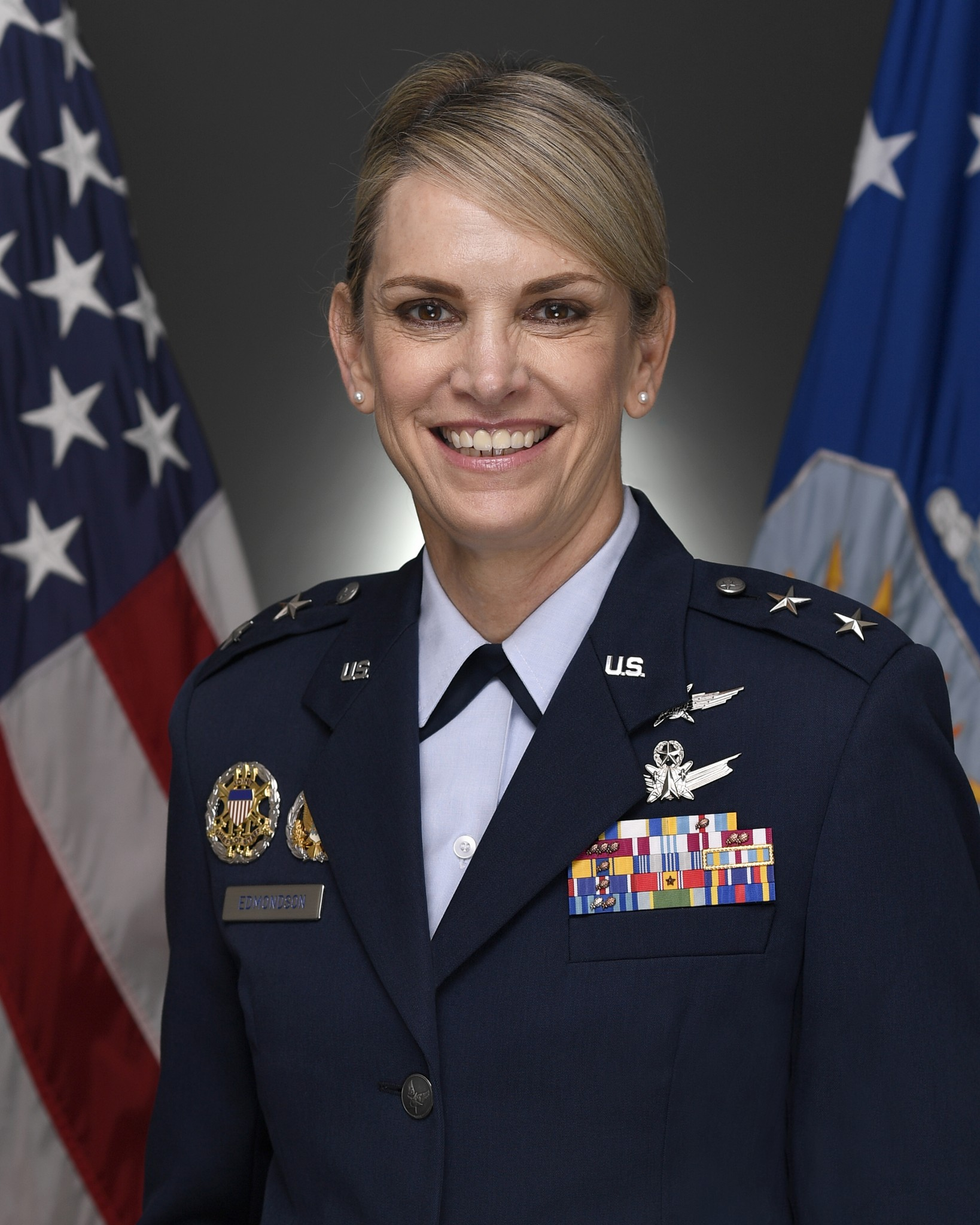
- Military career
- Allegiance: United States
- Branch: United States Air Force
- Service years: 1992–present
- Rank: Major General
- Commands: Second Air Force; Commandant of Cadets; 81st Training Wing; 737th Training Group; 381st Training Group; 2nd Space Warning Squadron
- Awards: Defense Superior Service Medal (2); Legion of Merit (4)

Michele C. Edmondson is a United States Air Force major general who served as the commander of Second Air Force from 2021 to 2024. She most recently served as the Commandant of Cadets for the U.S. Air Force Academy from 2019 to 2021.

== Early life and education ==
Edmondson graduated from the University of Florida, Gainesville with a Bachelor of Science in Aerospace Engineering in 1992, along with a commission as a Second Lieutenant through Air Force ROTC.

== Career ==
Edmondson has been a Space Operations Officer since 1992. From June 2012 to May 2014, she commanded the 381st Training Group at Vandenberg AFB, California. From June 2014 to May 2015, she commanded Air Force Basic Military Training at Joint Base San Antonio-Lackland. From June 2015 to June 2017, she commanded the 81st Training Wing at Keesler AFB, and then served as the Senior Executive Officer to the Vice Chief of Staff of the Air Force until 2018. Edmondson was the Director of Space Policy for the National Security Council until May 2019, when she became the Commandant of Cadets at the U.S. Air Force Academy. On April 7, 2021, it was announced that Edmondson would become the next commander of the Second Air Force.

Military offices
Preceded by Michael Lutton	Commander of the 381st Training Group; 2012–2014	Succeeded by Max Lantz
Preceded by Patrick C. Higby	Commander of the 81st Training Wing; 2015–2017	Succeeded by Debra Lovette
Preceded by Derek France	Senior Executive Officer to the Vice Chief of Staff of the United States Air Force; 2017–2018	Succeeded by Bradley L. Pyburn
Preceded by William Liquori	Director for Space Policy of the United States National Security Council; 2018–2019	Succeeded by Troy Endicott
Preceded by Kristin E. Goodwin	Commandant of Cadets of the United States Air Force Academy; 2019–2021	Succeeded by Paul D. Moga
Preceded by Andrea Tullos	Commander of the Second Air Force; 2021–2024	Succeeded by Matthew Wolfe Davidson
New office	Deputy Chief of Staff for Warfighter Communications and Cyber Systems of the United States Air Force; 2025–present	Incumbent
