= Joseph J. Redden =

United States Air Force general (1943–2024)

- Born: February 16, 1943; Council Bluffs, Iowa, U.S.
- Died: March 21, 2024 (aged 81)
- Military career
- Allegiance: United States of America
- Branch: United States Air Force
- Service years: 1964–1999
- Rank: Lieutenant general

Joseph J. Redden (February 16, 1943 – March 21, 2024) was an American Air Force lieutenant general who was commander of Air University at Maxwell Air Force Base in Montgomery, Alabama, and director of education of the Air Education and Training Command, headquartered at Randolph Air Force Base in Schertz, Texas.

Redden commissioned upon graduation from the U.S. Air Force Academy in 1964. He was a command pilot with more than 4,900 flying hours in several types of aircraft, including 607 combat missions for 1,323 combat hours. Throughout his career, he has served in a variety of flying, operations and command positions at the squadron, wing, major command and air staff levels. Prior to assuming command of Air University, General Redden commanded the Department of Defense's Joint Warfighting Center at Fort Monroe, Virginia. He retired on July 1, 1999.

Redden received a Bachelor of Science degree from the U.S. Air Force Academy in 1964. He also attended the Squadron Officer School, Auburn University Montgomery (Master's degree in political science), Air Command and Staff College, and the Army War College.

His awards include the Defense Distinguished Service Medal, Air Force Distinguished Service Medal, Legion of Merit with bronze oak leaf cluster, Distinguished Flying Cross with bronze oak leaf cluster, Meritorious Service Medal with bronze oak leaf cluster, Air Medal with five silver oak leaf clusters and three bronze oak leaf clusters, Air Force Commendation Medal, Presidential Unit Citation with two bronze oak leaf clusters, Air Force Outstanding Unit Award with "V" device and bronze oak leaf cluster, Combat Readiness Medal, National Defense Service Medal with bronze service star, Armed Forces Expeditionary Medal with bronze service star, Vietnam Service Medal with silver service star and two bronze service stars, Republic of Vietnam Gallantry Cross with Palm, and Republic of Vietnam Campaign Medal. He died on March 21, 2024.

== Assignments ==
- June 1964 – October 1965, student, pilot training, Craig Air Force Base, Ala.
- October 1965 – December 1967, C-130 pilot, 61st Tactical Airlift Squadron, Sewart Air Force Base, Tenn.
- December 1967 – July 1968, O-2A forward air controller, 23rd Tactical Air Support Squadron, Nakhon Phanom Royal Thai Air Force Base, Thailand
- July 1968 – April 1969, O-2A forward air controller, 23rd Tactical Air Support Squadron, Da Nang Air Base, South Vietnam
- April 1969 – May 1970, A-37 pilot, 604th Special Operations Squadron, later, assistant chief, A-37 tactics and standardization and evaluation, 3rd Tactical Fighter Wing, Bien Hoa Air Base, South Vietnam
- May 1970 – October 1971, A-37 pilot, instructor pilot, later, flight commander, 6th Special Operations Squadron, England Air Force Base, La.
- October 1971 – February 1974, KC-135 pilot, aircraft commander, instructor pilot, squadron operations officer, 7th Air Refueling Squadron, Carswell Air Force Base, Texas
- March 1974 – August 1976, wing plans officer, squadron operations officer, 356th Tactical Fighter Squadron, 354th Tactical Fighter Wing, Myrtle Beach Air Force Base, S.C.
- August 1976 – July 1977, student, Air Command and Staff College, Air University, Maxwell Air Force Base, Ala.
- July 1977 – December 1979, A-10/A-7/A-37/F-100 training branch chief, Headquarters Tactical Air Command, Langley Air Force Base, Va.
- December 1979 – April 1980, executive officer to the vice commander, Headquarters Tactical Air Command, Langley Air Force Base, Va.
- April 1980 – July 1982, operations officer, 75th Tactical Fighter Squadron, later, commander, 76th Tactical Fighter Squadron, 23rd Tactical Fighter Wing, England Air Force Base, La.
- July 1982 – July 1983, student, Army War College, Carlisle Barracks, Pa.
- July 1983 – March 1985, deputy chief, then chief, CHECKMATE Group, Headquarters U.S. Air Force, Washington, D.C.
- March 1985 – January 1986, vice commander, 347th Tactical Fighter Wing, Moody Air Force Base, Ga.
- January 1986 – February 1988, commander, 354th Tactical Fighter Wing, Myrtle Beach Air Force Base, S.C.
- February 1988 – June 1988, special assistant to commander, Headquarters Tactical Air Command, Langley Air Force Base, Va.
- July 1988 – June 1989, inspector general, Headquarters Tactical Air Command, Langley Air Force Base, Va.
- June 1989 – July 1992, commandant of cadets, U.S. Air Force Academy, Colorado Springs, Colo.
- July 1992 – October 1994, deputy chief of staff, plans, and staff director, PACOPS plans, later, director of plans, Headquarters Pacific Air Forces, Hickam Air Force Base, Hawaii
- October 1994 – October 1996, commander, Joint Warfighting Center, Fort Monroe, Va.
- October 1996 – July 1999, commander, Air University, Maxwell Air Force Base, Ala., and director of education, Headquarters Air Education and Training Command, Randolph Air Force Base, Texas
