= S. Taco Gilbert III =

United States Air Force general

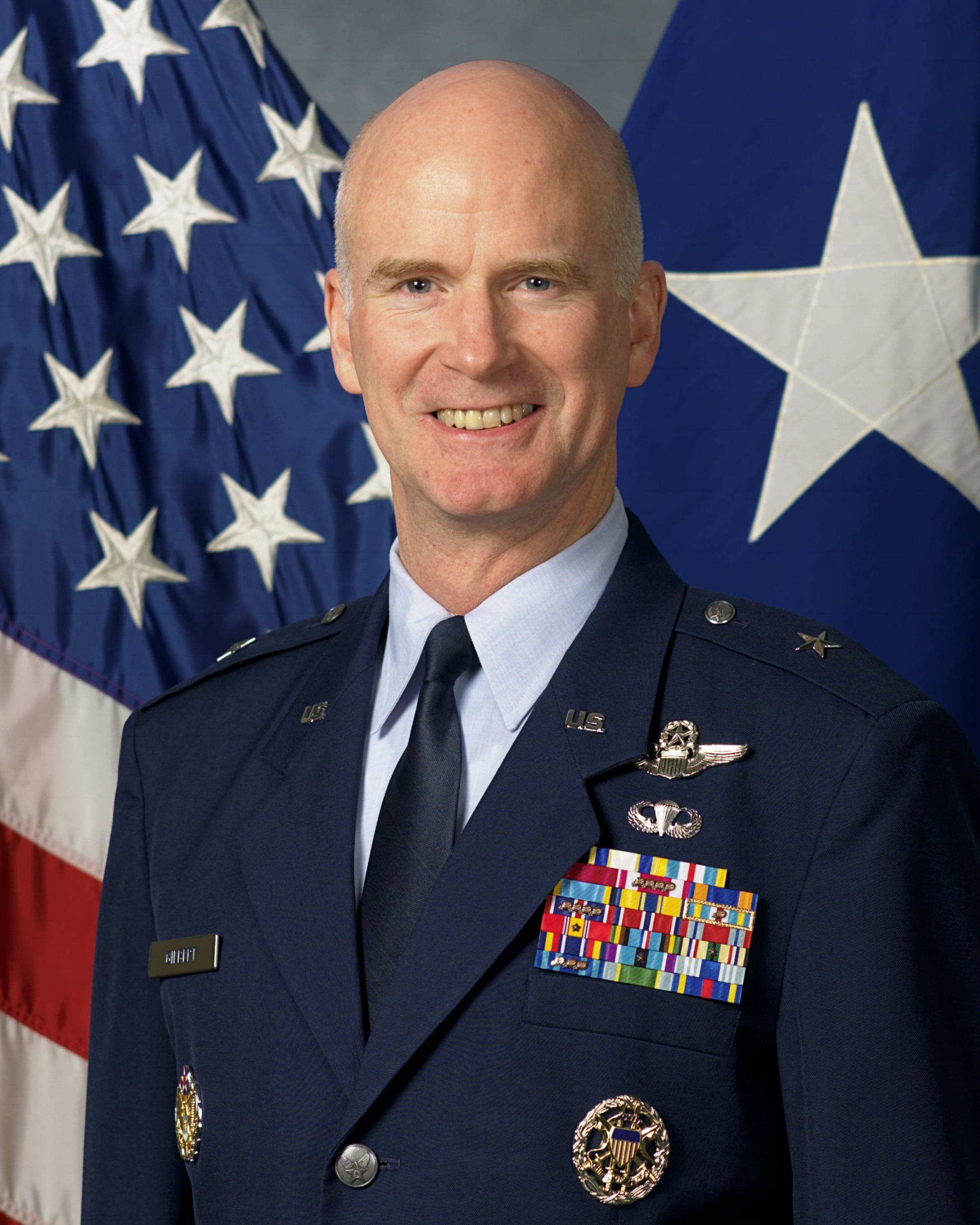
- Gilbert as a Brigadier General in 2007
- Born: October 15, 1956 (age 70)
- Military career
- Allegiance: United States of America
- Branch: United States Air Force
- Service years: 1978–2009
- Rank: Brigadier General

Silvanus Taco Gilbert III (born October 15, 1956) is a retired brigadier general in the United States Air Force. His last assignment was Director of Strategic Plans, Requirements and Programs, Headquarters Air Mobility Command, Scott Air Force Base, Illinois.

Gilbert graduated with honors from the U.S. Air Force Academy in 1978. He attended Fudan University in People's Republic of China as an Olmsted Scholar, and he has earned master's degrees in public administration, airpower strategy and national security strategy. He has commanded a refueling squadron, operations group, airlift wing and training wing. Prior to his last assignment, he was Director, Air Force Smart Operations 21, Office of the Secretary of the Air Force, Washington, D.C., and Director of Strategic Planning, Headquarters U.S. Air Force. He is a command pilot with more than 3,000 flying hours in the T-38A, FB-111A, KC-135 and C-5 aircraft.

Gilbert also attended Squadron Officer School, Harvard University, the Air Command and Staff College and the National War College at Fort Lesley J. McNair in Washington, D.C.. His awards include the Distinguished Service Medal with two oak leaf clusters, Defense Superior Service Medal, Legion of Merit, Meritorious Service Medal with four oak leaf clusters, Air Medal, Aerial Achievement Medal, Combat Readiness Medal, National Defense Service Medal with bronze star, Armed Forces Expeditionary Medal, Southwest Asia Service Medal with bronze star and Humanitarian Service Medal. He retired on September 1, 2009.

== Assignments ==
- July 1978 – June 1979, student, undergraduate pilot training, Reese AFB, Texas
- July 1979 – October 1982, T-38A instructor pilot and flight examiner, Reese AFB, Texas
- November 1982 – May 1983, student, Defense Language Institute, Presidio of Monterey, Calif.
- June 1983 – July 1985, Olmsted scholar, Central Minorities Institute, Beijing, and Fudan University, Shanghai, People's Republic of China
- July 1985 – June 1986, graduate student, Harvard University, Cambridge, Mass.
- July 1986 – July 1990, FB-111A aircraft commander, instructor pilot and Chief of Scheduling, 528th Bomb Squadron; later, assistant operations officer, 530th Combat Crew Training Squadron, and wing executive officer, 380th Bomb Wing, Plattsburgh AFB, N.Y.
- August 1990 – June 1992, student, Air Command and Staff College, and graduate student, School of Advanced Airpower Studies, Air University, Maxwell AFB, Ala.
- June 1992 – October 1993, staff officer, Air Force Chief of Staff's Operations Group, Headquarters U.S. Air Force, Washington, D.C.
- October 1993 – July 1995, Commander, 91st Air Refueling Squadron, Malmstrom AFB, Mont.
- August 1995 – June 1996, graduate student, National War College, Fort Lesley J. McNair, Washington, D.C.
- August 1996 – August 1997, Commander, 22nd Operations Group, McConnell AFB, Kan.
- September 1997 – June 1999, special assistant to the Assistant of the Chairman, Joint Chiefs of Staff, Washington, D.C.
- July 1999 – July 2001, Commander, 436th Airlift Wing, Dover AFB, Del.
- August 2001 – April 2003, Commandant of Cadets and Commander, 34th Training Wing, U.S. Air Force Academy, Colorado Springs, Colo.
- April 2003 – June 2006, Deputy Director, later, Director of Strategic Planning, Headquarters U.S. Air Force, Washington, D.C.
- June 2006 – August 2007, Director, Air Force Smart Operations 21, Office of the Secretary of the Air Force, Washington, D.C.
- August 2007 – September 2009, Director, Strategic Plans, Requirements, and Programs, Headquarters Air Mobility Command, Scott AFB Ill
