= Helion Lodge 1 =

Masonic lodge in Huntsville, Alabama

Coordinates: 34.73029°N 86.58127°W

Helion Lodge Building (2006)

Helion Lodge #1 F.&A.M. is a Masonic lodge in Huntsville, Alabama. It is the oldest operating lodge in the state. According to Grand Historian Joseph Abram Jackson's Masonry in Alabama, it is "the birthplace of Freemasonry in Alabama." Helion Lodge is the common name for the building, which is actually named "Eunomia Hall" for the Eunomia Chapter #5 Royal Arch Masons who financed its construction. It was built in 1911, where the lodge meets.

== History ==
In 1805, a Revolutionary War veteran named John Hunt built a log cabin at the Big Spring and founded what would grow to become the modern city of Huntsville, Alabama. Six years later, on August 21, 1811, Madison Lodge #21 received its dispensation from the Grand Lodge of Kentucky. In 1812, it received its official charter from the Grand Lodge of Kentucky. John Hunt was among the first members, as was LeRoy Pope, who had given the city its original name of Twickenham. On April 6, 1818, a second Lodge was formed in the county, Bethesda Lodge #2. In 1824, the two Lodges combined as Helion Lodge #1 under the Grand Lodge of Alabama.

Helion Lodge survived the American Civil War, when Huntsville was often occupied by the Union Army. The quiet little town grew rapidly after World War II, when the area became host to both Redstone Arsenal and the Marshall Spaceflight Center. Notable members involved in the growth of Huntsville's defense and space industry are Senator John Sparkman and Mayor Joe W. Davis. Helion Lodge soon came to have the largest membership in the state. As a result, in 1962, a new Lodge was formed in Huntsville, Solar Lodge #914. Most of the members came from Helion Lodge. Five years later, in 1967, a third Huntsville Lodge was formed, Apollo Lodge #921. Both younger Lodges consider Helion as their mother Lodge and dual membership is common.

On Wednesday night, August 30, 1922, Helion was the location of the formation of Twickenham Chapter of The Order of DeMolay; the first chapter of The Order of DeMolay in the state of Alabama.

On January 6, 2018, a fire destroyed historical books stored in the Lodge.

== Past Masters ==
The previous masters of the lodge are:

Number	No. (Years)	Past Master	Ref.
	1811	Marmaduke Williams	Madison Lodge 21, Grand Lodge of Kentucky Dispensation
1	1812	Louis Winston	Madison Lodge 21, Grand Lodge of Kentucky Charter
	1813-1817	David R. Moore	Madison Lodge 21
1-2	1818-1820	William Atwood	Alabama Lodge 21, Grand Lodge of Tennessee Charter
	1821	Alexander Erskin	Grand Lodge of Alabama Formed
	1822	W. Thomas Wooldridge	Madison Lodge 1
	1823	W. J. Grimes	Madison Lodge 1
	1822-1823	W. A. Hutchinson	Bethesda Lodge 2
	1824	W. J. Grimes	Madison Lodge 1
	1824	Issac Williams	Bethesda Lodge 2
1	1824	Issac Williams	Consolidation of Madison Lodge #1 and Bethesda Lodge #2 into Helion #1
2-3	1825-1826	William Feeny	
4-5	1827-1828	John J. Fackler	
6	1829	William Feeny	
7	1830	John Acklen	
8-13	1831-1836	W. A. Hutchinson	
14-19	1837-1842	James Penn	
20	1843	Ellison Smith	
21-22	1844-1845	James Penn, MWGM	
23-24	1846-1847	J. M. Davidson	
25	1848	Arch E. Mills	
26	1849	J. M. Davidson	
27	1850	Fred Gate	
28-29	1851-1852	J. J. Sample	
30	1853	J. F. Steele	
31-39	1854-1862	William Gormley	
40-41	1863-1864	J. E. Young	
42	1865	E. B. Clapp	
43-46	1866-1869	J. J. Dement	
47-48	1870-1871	S. J. Mayhew	
49	1872	M. C. Baldridge	Dr. Milton Columbus Baldridge,
50	1873	W. S. Reddick	
51-52	1874-1875	Bernard F. Ludwig	
53-54	1876-1877	M. C. Baldridge	Dr. Milton Columbus Baldridge,
55-57	1878-1880	John L. Rison	
58-64	1881-1887	M. C. Baldridge	Dr. Milton Columbus Baldridge,
65	1888	W. C. Weaver	
66-68	1889-1891	M. C. Baldridge	Dr. Milton Columbus Baldridge,
69-70	1892-1893	Amos B. Jones	
71	1894	Thomas Taylor	
72	1895	Joseph Skinner	
73	1896	Alred Moore	
74-76	1897-1899	W. C. Wheeler	
77	1900	L. R. Wellman	
78	1901	W. C. Wheeler	
79-80	1902-1903	H. C. Pollard	
81	1904	Augustus F. Evans	
82	1905	Frank Ford	
83	1906	Frank Pugh Culver	
84-85	1907-1908	Leroy Suggs	
86	1909	Robert Coman Brickell	
87-88	1910-1911	James Hamilton Ballentine	
89	1912	H. C. Pollard	
90	1913	J. W. Battle	
91-93	1914-1916	James Louis Kendall	
94	1917	A. F. Kendall	
95	1918	G. H. Heymann	
96-97	1919-1920	Alexander M. P. Dunn	
98	1921	J. B. McCord	
99	1922	W. R. Laxson	
100-101	1923-1924	Samuel C. Alexander	
102-103	1925-1926	Sam S. Rice	
104	1927	Charles. O. Rolfe	
105	1928	Robert Collyer Chase Jr.	
106	1929	F. J. Shick	
107	1930	James D. Rice, Jr.	
108-109	1931-1932	John S. McLure	
110-111	1933-1934	William B. Allen	
112	1935	P. S. McCormick	
113	1936	Joe B. Hill	
114	1937	Cowan Y. Wilson	
115	1938	Thomas Pickens Gates	
116	1939	F. Floyd Broyles	
117	1940	John S. McLure	
118-119	1941-1942	Henry R. Martin	
120-121	1943-1944	Clyde Martz	
122	1945	Abe Pizitz	
123	1946	Clyde Martz	
124	1947	Jasan A. Williams	
125	1948	John W. Walker	
126	1949	William B. Allen	
127	1950	John H. McGaha	
128	1951	Louie L. Baucom	
129	1952	William Brandon Jones Sr.	
130	1953	Estelle Hugh Hall	
131	1954	William Hiram Ealy	
132	1955	D. Shelby Vaughn	
133	1956	Doyle Wallace Ealy	
134	1957	William Andrew Cobb Sr.	
135	1958	Dan L. Warden	
136	1959	John Dillard Harris	
137	1960	Willie Lee Guthrie	
138	1961	John Clark Beeler	
139	1962	Wendell McKinney	
140	1963	Carl Pickens	
141	1964	Randolph Rush	
142	1965	Robert Franklin Jean	
143	1966	James Walter Bass	
144	1967	James G. Williams	
145	1968	William W. Byrd	
146	1969	Charles D. Rozell	
147	1970	Charles Keathley	
148	1971	Emory J. Ferguson	
149	1972	Dewey Marlin Hinkle	
150	1973	Hubert Lemaster	
151	1974	Hollis L. Sharp	
152	1975	R. M. Slaughter	
153	1976	Robert J. Cannon	
154	1977	Fred Allen Beddingfield	
155	1978	Clarence Woodrow Landrum	
156	1979	Robert Arnold Kachelhofer Sr.	
157	1980	Ronald W. Thomas	
158	1981	B. J. Nelson	
159	1982	Alvie Lee Berry	
160	1983	David Allen	
161	1984	Lee D. Parker	
162	1985	Johnie Wilbanks	
163	1986	James Garry Smith	
164	1987	James Wesley Reach	
165	1988	Wayne Dee Jordan	
166	1989	Clarence Morrison Albright	
167	1990	Donald Douglas Beal	
168	1991	David K. Hall	
169	1992	Charles R. Kirch	
170	1993	James Shelby Aston	
171	1994	John W. Herron	
172	1995	Danny B. Lamont	
173	1996	E. J. Wadsworth	
174	1997	Theo Starkey	
175	1998	Raymond Charles Dunn	
176	1999	James S. Blanteno	
177	2000	George Hall	
178	2001	John Pavlick	
179	2002	David Milam	
180	2003	Raymond Tanner	
181	2004	James Henley	
182	2005	Dennis Peterson	
183	2006	Lawrence Everett "Larry" Gilliss	
184	2007	Andy Thomas	
185	2008	Steve McGlocklin	
186	2009	Michael Feld	
187	2010	Jerry Burpee	
188	2011	Ed Kachelhofer	
189	2012	Ken Carpenter	
190	2013	David Miller	
191	2014	Jared Cassidy	
192	2015	George Lewis	
193	2016	Dean Lilja	
194	2017	John Hood	
195	2018	Mike Morgan	
196	2019	Doug Collinsworth	
197	2020	John D. Pennington	
198	2021	Thomas Jeffrey Beasley	
199	2022	Benjamin James Ledford	
200	2023	John Leslie Clay	
201	2024	Charles Phillip Cozelos	
202	2025	Chad Wesley Thrasher	

== Honorary Past Masters ==
The following have been designated honorary masters:

Number	Year	Honorary Past Master	Ref.
1		James Curtis Smith	
2	2005	Ewing G. Storey	
3	2009	Herschel Leonard Ouzts	
4	2014	Richard Carter Storey	
5	2014	Stephen Marc Gilbert	Dynetics
6	2024	Stephen C. Chapman	

== Location ==
Helion Lodge stands on the original site of Madison Lodge #21 at 409 Lincoln Street in the Twickenham Historic District of Huntsville. The present building is over 100 years old and was designed by noted architect, and Lodge member, Edgar Love. The cornerstone was laid in 1911.

The building was officially named Eunomia Masonic Hall after the Royal Arch Chapter, but is now simply called Helion Lodge. It is home to both Helion Lodge and the Huntsville York Rite bodies, as well as to Twickenham-Milford Order of DeMolay and to White Light Assembly #66, International Order of the Rainbow for Girls. It is the oldest Lodge in the state of Alabama.

The building has a reputation for being haunted by ghosts.

== Awards ==
Helion Lodge received the Masonic Service Association of North America's Mark Twain Award for Masonic Awareness, in the lodge and in the community, in 2008, 2009, and 2010. Helion Lodge received the Twain Award again in 2012. Ittis ime recipient of the Twain Award for Masonic Awareness.
