= Kay Ivey =

Governor of Alabama since 2017

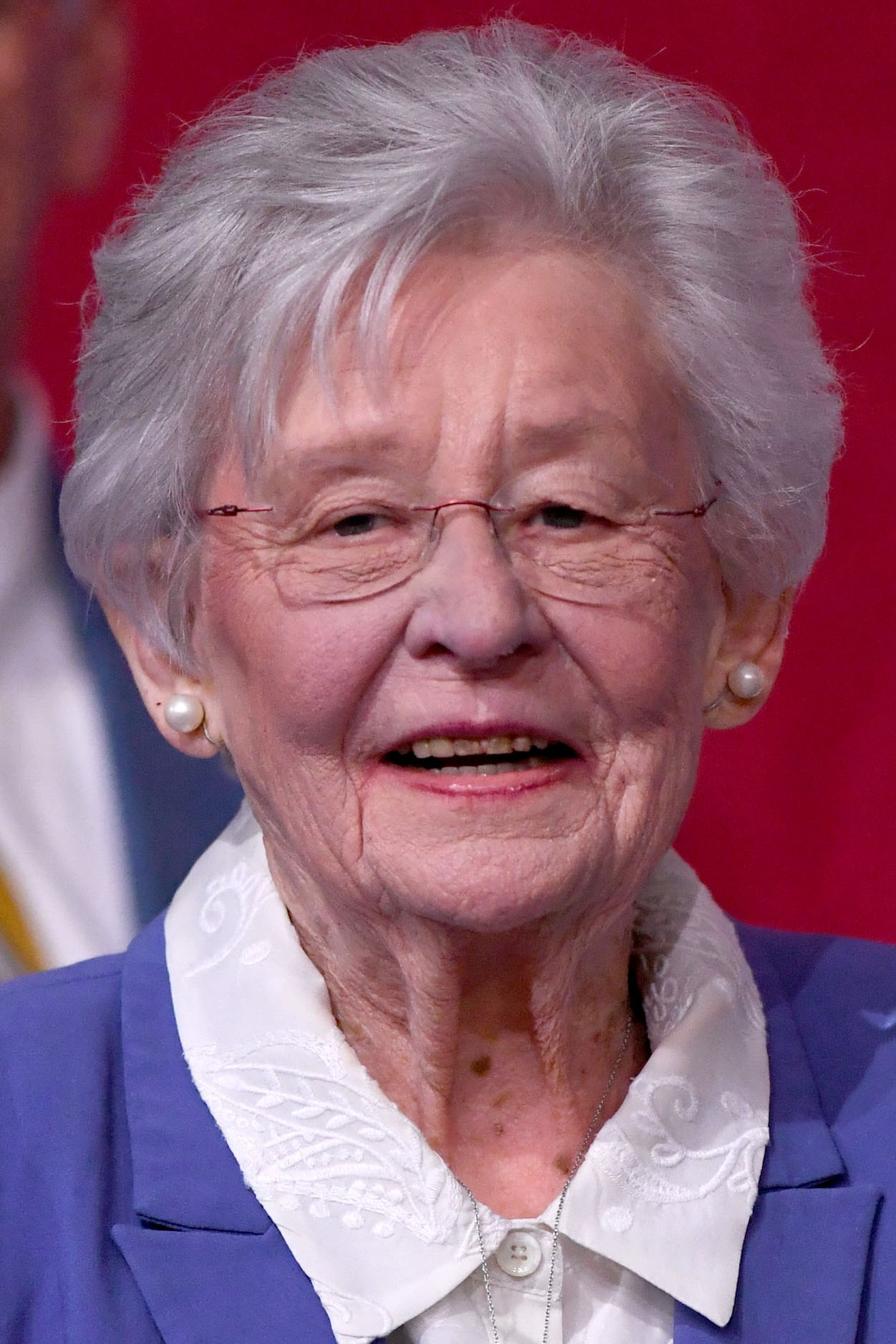
- Ivey in 2026

54th Governor of Alabama
- Incumbent
- Assumed office April 10, 2017
- Lieutenant: Will Ainsworth (since 2019)
- Preceded by: Robert J. Bentley

30th Lieutenant Governor of Alabama
- In office January 17, 2011 – April 10, 2017
- Governor: Robert J. Bentley
- Preceded by: Jim Folsom Jr.
- Succeeded by: Will Ainsworth^{[nb]}

38th Treasurer of Alabama
- In office January 20, 2003 – January 17, 2011
- Governor: Bob Riley
- Preceded by: Lucy Baxley
- Succeeded by: Young Boozer

Personal details
- Born: Kay Ellen Ivey; October 15, 1944 (age 82) Camden, Alabama, U.S.
- Party: Democratic (before 2002); Republican (2002–present)
- Spouse(s): Ben LaRavia (m. 1967; div. 1969) Tom Clement (m. 1991; div. 1993)
- Education: Auburn University (BA)
- n.b. Office vacant between April 10, 2017 and January 14, 2019

Kay Ellen Ivey (/ˈaɪvi/ EYE-vee; born October 15, 1944) is an American politician from Alabama. A member of the Republican Party, Ivey has served since 2017 as the 54th governor of Alabama.

Ivey was the assistant director of the Alabama Development Office from 1982 to 1985. From 1985 to 1998, she worked as director of government affairs and communications for the Alabama Commission on Higher Education. Ivey served from 2003 to 2011 as the 38th Alabama state treasurer and from 2011 to 2017 as the 30th lieutenant governor of Alabama.

On April 10, 2017, Ivey became Alabama's second female governor upon the resignation of her predecessor, Robert J. Bentley. She won a full term in 2018 and was reelected in 2022. She is the longest-serving female governor in U.S. history.

Because of term limits, Ivey is ineligible for reelection to a third full term. Tommy Tuberville is the governor-elect.

== Early life, education, and early career ==
Ivey was born on October 15, 1944, in Camden, Alabama, as the only child to Boadman Nettles Ivey and Barbara Elizabeth Ivey (née Nettles). Her father, who served as an officer in the U.S. Army during World War II, worked with the Gees Bend community as part of the Farmers Home Administration.

Growing up in Camden, Ivey worked on her father's farm. She graduated from Auburn University, where she was a member of Alpha Gamma Delta, becoming president of her first-year pledge class, and served in the Student Government Association all four years. In 1967, Ivey participated in a blackface skit while attending Auburn. When questioned about the skit in 2019, she initially claimed not to have taken part in it. After a recording surfaced in which she discussed her participation in the skit, she admitted it and apologized for her conduct.

In 1967, Ivey moved to California and became a high school teacher for several years. She later returned to Alabama and landed a position with Merchants National Bank, where she launched a school relations program to promote financial literacy.

== Entry into politics ==
In 1979, Alabama Governor Fob James appointed Ivey to the state cabinet. She served as the reading clerk of the Alabama House of Representatives from 1980 to 1982 and as assistant director of the Alabama Development Office from 1982 to 1985.

In 1982, Ivey ran for state auditor as a Democrat but lost the primary to Jan Cook. Ivey was director of government affairs and communications for the Alabama Commission on Higher Education from 1985 to 1998.

== Alabama State Treasurer (2003–2011) ==
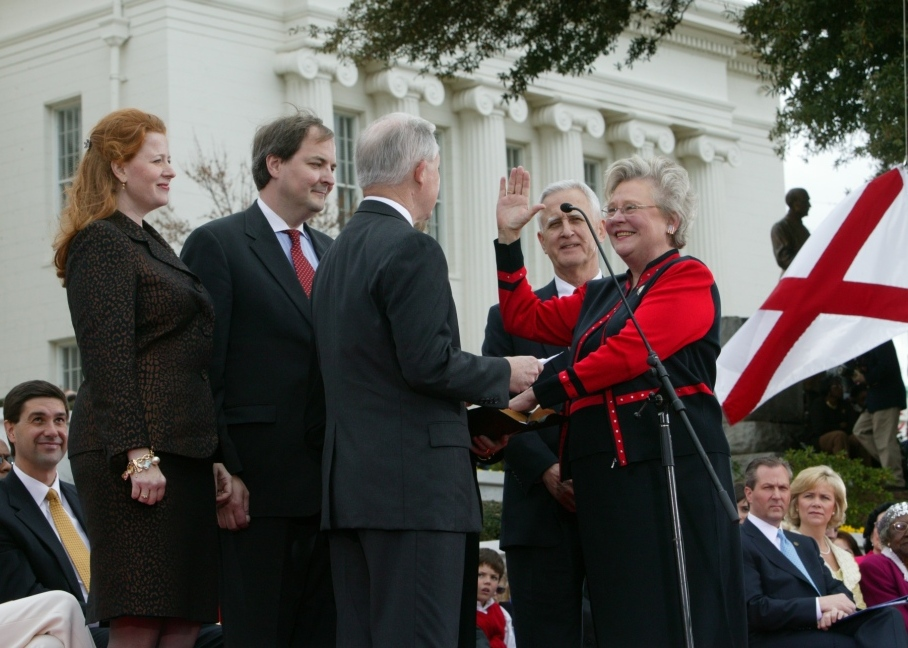
Ivey is sworn into a second term as State Treasurer by Jeff Sessions in 2007

Ivey ran for state treasurer as a Republican in 2002. She defeated Stephen Black, the grandson of former United States Supreme Court justice Hugo Black, with 52% of the vote. In 2006, Ivey was reelected over Democratic nominee Steve Segrest by a 20-point margin. She was the first Republican elected state treasurer since Reconstruction.

Ivey served as treasurer during the near-complete financial collapse of the Prepaid Affordable College Tuition (PACT) program. Under this program the state assured tens of thousands of Alabama families that their investment in the program would guarantee their children four years' tuition at any state college. During the period after the program's inception in 1990, many of the state's colleges increased the cost of tuition at triple the inflation rate (or more), and that combined with stock market downturns in 2000 and 2008 made the program financially unsustainable. The state legislature subsequently bailed it out.

== Lieutenant Governor of Alabama (2011–2017) ==
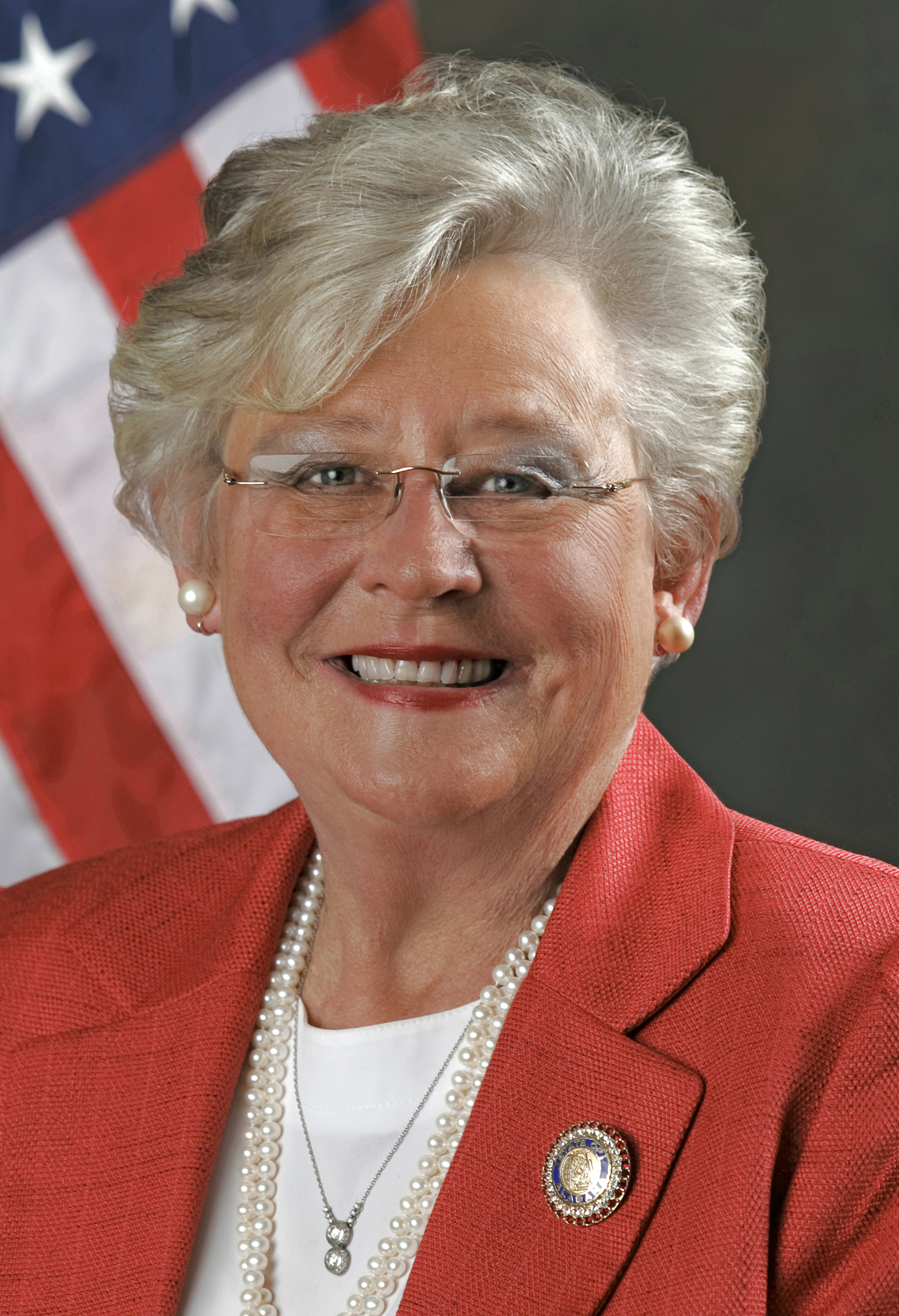
Official Lt. Governor portrait, 2012

Under the Alabama Constitution, Ivey was not eligible to seek reelection to a third term as state treasurer in 2010. Her name surfaced in press speculation about gubernatorial candidates in 2010.

In 2009, Ivey announced her candidacy for the Republican nomination for governor in the 2010 elections, joining a crowded field of seven Republican candidates. In March 2010, Ivey abandoned her run for governor and qualified to run for lieutenant governor. She ran against State Senator Hank Erwin of Montevallo and schoolteacher Gene Ponder of Baldwin County for the Republican nomination. In the June 2010 primary election, Ivey won the nomination with 56.6% of the vote, to Erwin's 31.4% and Ponder's 12%.

In the November 2010 elections, in a Republican sweep of statewide offices, Ivey defeated Democratic incumbent Lieutenant Governor Jim Folsom Jr., who had sought an unprecedented fourth term. Ivey received 764,112 votes to Folsom's 718,636.

In 2014, Ivey was challenged in the Republican primary by pastor Stan Cooke of Jefferson County. Ivey received the support of major lobbying groups, such as the Business Council of Alabama, Alabama Retail Association, Alabama Farmers Federation, and Alabama Forestry Association. Ivey defeated Cooke in the primary, with 257,588 votes (61.68%) to Cooke's 160,023 (38.32%). In the general election, Ivey faced Democratic nominee James C. Fields, a former state legislator. In November 2014, Ivey won reelection with 738,090 votes to Fields's 428,007. This marked the first time a Republican was reelected lieutenant governor in the state's history.

== Governor of Alabama (2017–present) ==
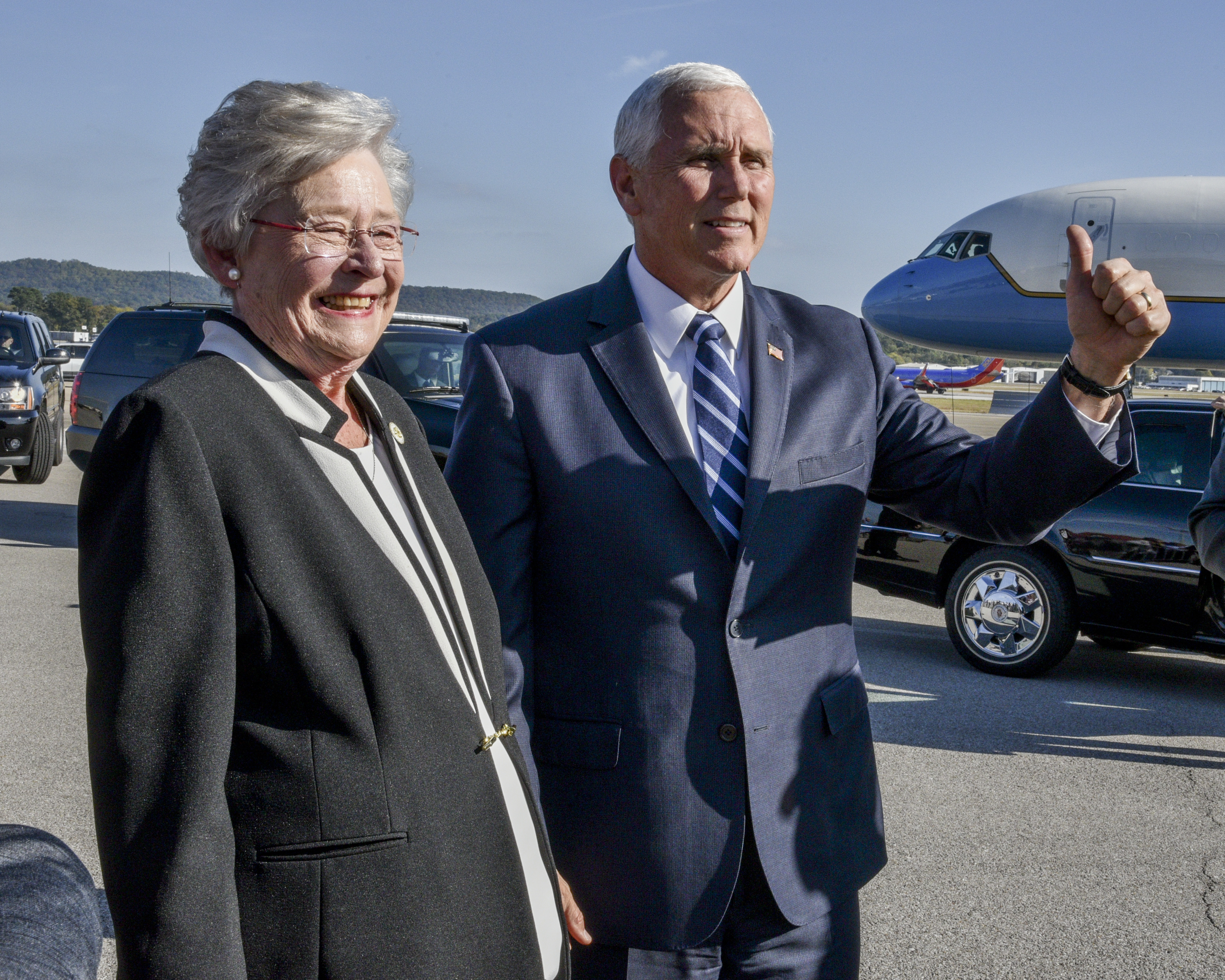
Ivey with Vice President Mike Pence during his visit to Alabama, October 2018

=== Succession and elections ===
Ivey was sworn in as governor following the resignation of Robert J. Bentley on April 10, 2017. She is the second female governor in the state's history. The first was Lurleen Wallace, the wife of former governor George Wallace; she was governor for about 16 months in 1967 and 1968, until her death from cancer.

In September 2017, Ivey announced that she would seek election to a full term in the 2018 gubernatorial election. Ivey won a full term in 2018, defeating Democratic nominee Walt Maddox.

In June 2021, Ivey's office announced her decision to run for a second full term as governor in 2022. Ivey drew 14 challengers by the time the candidate qualification period closed. Eight of those running against her were doing so in the Republican primary. Ivey won the Republican primary and defeated Democratic nominee Yolanda Flowers in the general election.

=== Tenure ===
Ivey is the longest-serving female governor in American history and the "longest continually-serving governor in Alabama history".

==== 2017 U.S. Senate special election ====
Former U.S. Senator Jeff Sessions resigned from that office in February 2017 to serve as U.S. Attorney General, whereupon then-Governor Bentley chose Luther Strange to succeed Sessions in the Senate, pending a special election that Bentley controversially scheduled for 2018 instead of sooner. When Ivey succeeded Bentley, she rescheduled the special election for December 12, 2017.

After former Alabama Chief Justice Roy Moore won the Republican nomination for the U.S. Senate seat, The Washington Post published an article revealing allegations of sexual abuse against minors by Moore, which caused many Republican voters and groups in Alabama to withdraw their support for him. There began to be discussion as to whether Ivey would delay the election to allow the Republicans to field an alternative candidate. Ivey subsequently said: "The election date is set for December 12. Were [Strange] to resign I would simply appoint somebody to fill the remaining time until we have the election on December 12." Ivey stated on November 17 that although she had no reason to disbelieve the allegations, she intended to vote for Moore to protect the Republican majority in the U.S. Senate, a statement for which she was criticized. Moore lost the special election to former U.S. Attorney and Democratic nominee Doug Jones. On December 28 Ivey and Alabama Secretary of State John Merrill certified the senatorial election result despite an attempt by the Moore campaign to delay certification over unsubstantiated accusations of voter fraud.

==== Abortion ====
In August 2018, after the 11th Circuit Court of Appeals issued a ruling that blocked the Alabama Unborn Child Protection from Dismemberment Act, Ivey reflected on her support for the state law while serving as lieutenant governor and said, "we should not let this discourage our steadfast commitment to protect the lives of the unborn, even if that means taking this case to the U.S. Supreme Court." She added that the ruling "clearly demonstrates why we need conservative justices on the Supreme Court" and expressed her support for the confirmation of Justice Brett Kavanaugh. The United States Supreme Court declined to hear an appeal of the 11th Circuit Court's ruling. The American Civil Liberties Union represented those opposing appeal. ACLU attorney Andrew Beck said, "While we are pleased to see the end of this particular case, we know that it is nowhere near the end of efforts to undermine access to abortion."

On May 15, 2019, Ivey signed the more restrictive House Bill 314, which intended to criminalize abortion as of November 2019, with the exception of cases where the mother's life is under threat or the fetus might not survive. It mandated prison sentences of up to 99 years for physicians performing such surgery, with no exceptions in cases of rape or incest. The bill violated Roe v. Wade, according to which laws banning abortion before fetal viability were unconstitutional, and was expected to be challenged in court. On October 29, shortly before the law was to take effect, a federal judge blocked the statute. Ivey and Alabama Attorney General Steve Marshall said they expected the Supreme Court would overturn the ruling on appeal.

In July 2021, Ivey and Marshall joined 11 other governors and 23 other attorneys general in filing an amicus brief in a case where the Jackson Women's Health Organization filed a lawsuit that challenged a Mississippi bill that banned abortions after 15 weeks gestation. After Roe v. Wade was overturned in July 2022, Ivey released a statement saying that "our prayers have been answered" and that she "could not be more proud as a governor, a Christian and a woman to see this misguided and detrimental decision overturned."

==== Clean government ====
Shortly after the beginning of her second full term as governor in January 2023, Ivey signed an executive order aiming to promote transparency in state government by requiring agencies to respond to public records requests. The same month, the Alabama Department of Transportation acquired an emergency order to prevent the release of communications between its director, John Cooper, and Ivey's office. This came amid a lawsuit between the agency and the Baldwin County Bridge Company; Cooper sought to withhold these records from the Montgomery County Circuit Court, and cited "executive privilege" in doing so. Less than a week after the enactment of the transparency executive order, Ivey signed an amicus curiae filing in support of Cooper's efforts to suppress the release of the communication records with her office.

==== Confederate monuments ====
In May 2017, Ivey signed a bill barring the removal of any monuments on public display, or the renaming of any public street or building, that had existed for 40 years or more. The law has the effect of protecting the state's Confederate monuments.

==== COVID-19 ====
On March 13, 2020, Ivey declared a state of emergency over the COVID-19 pandemic. She was initially reluctant to issue a stay-at-home order, but bowed to pressure from Lieutenant Governor Will Ainsworth, among others, who criticized her pandemic response as inadequate. On April 3, she issued a stay-at-home order to take effect the following day.

In May 2021, Ivey prohibited Alabama's businesses and public institutions from requiring proof of vaccination against COVID-19 to access facilities and services. In July 2021, she pleaded with Alabamians to get vaccinated, blaming the unvaccinated for the continued spread of the disease. In September 2021, she signed a bill into law that used COVID-19 relief funds to build new prisons in Alabama. In October 2021, she ordered Alabama's state agencies to refuse to comply with federal vaccine requirements.

==== Criminal justice ====
In April 2017, Ivey signed a bill into law that bars judges from overruling a jury's recommendation on the death penalty in sentencing in capital murder cases. Previously Alabama had been the only state with a "judicial override" that allowed a judge to sentence a defendant to death when a jury had recommended a sentence of life without parole. Before the bill passed, Alabama's capital sentencing scheme was viewed as likely to be struck down as unconstitutional by the U.S. Supreme Court.

In May 2017, Ivey signed a bill to speed up death penalty appeals and hasten executions in Alabama.

In February 2026, Ivey signed a bill that makes certain sexual crimes against children under 12 capital offenses.

During her tenure as governor, Ivey authorized and oversaw more executions than any other governor in Alabama history. She also commuted the death sentences of three prisoners—Rocky Myers, Charles Lee Burton and Toforest Johnson—making her the governor who has granted clemency to the most condemned inmates in the state's history.

==== Economic policy ====
On April 6, 2018, Ivey signed a bill sponsored by Ken Johnson to exempt economic development professionals from registering as lobbyists under the Alabama ethics law. She said the legislation would allow the state "to remain on a level playing field with other states, as we compete for job creating capital investments" and Alabama's ability to attract highly sought-after economic development projects would allow the state to continue experiencing "record-low unemployment". On April 9, 2018, Ivey signed a bill extending the reach of the Simplified Sellers Use Tax to capture purchases from third-party vendors selling products through Amazon and other online marketplaces. In a press release, Ivey said the legislation would "help bring about a competitive balance between brick-and-mortar retailers in Alabama and third-party online sellers, while streamlining the collection of use taxes that are currently due on online transactions."

In a June 2018 letter to United States Secretary of Commerce Wilbur Ross, Ivey wrote that she opposed "any efforts that may harm those companies that employ thousands of Alabamians and contribute billions to our economy" and advocated for Ross to "not recommend to President Trump the levying of trade tariffs on automobiles and automotive parts." In August 2018, Ivey named Kelly Butler as Alabama acting finance director, saying that Butler would serve until the completion of a search for a permanent director and would "do an excellent job leading the Alabama Department of Finance during this interim period."

==== Education ====
In October 2018, Ivey announced her intent to form an advisory council with the purpose of studying ways to improve science, technology, engineering and math instruction in schools to meet an expectation of strong job demands over the following decade. Ivey said that STEM-related jobs were expected to grow faster than most other forms of employment while paying a median wage roughly twice as large as jobs in other fields and that the Governor's Advisory Council for Excellence in STEM would include educators and representatives of government, business and industry who would give her a comprehensive report on the matter by the end of the year.

On March 7, 2024, Ivey signed the Creating Hope & Opportunity for Our Students' Education (CHOOSE) Act. The law permits parents to receive up to $7,000 to mitigate the cost of private or public education for their children.

In March 2024, Ivey signed SB 129, preventing public teachers from getting students to conform or accept "divisive concepts" and blocking public funds from being used for DEI efforts. She said that although she supported the state's "rich diversity", she wanted to prevent people on college campuses from using "their liberal political movement counter to what the majority of Alabamians believe.”

Ivey supported the May 2024 Education Trust Fund budget passed by the Alabama Legislature, which she argued "wisely invests in the spectrum of education" and would jumpstart "priority projects like the Alabama School of Healthcare Sciences."

==== Elections ====
In May 2017, Ivey signed a bill banning crossover voting (the practice of casting a ballot in one party's primary election and then casting a ballot in other party's runoff elections).

In May 2024, Ivey signed into law a bill that criminalizes the use of artificial intelligence (AI) to create materially deceptive media in election campaigns. For first-time offenders, it is a misdemeanor to distribute AI-generated deepfakes showing a person saying or doing something they did not. Subsequent violations are felonies. The law went into effect on October 1, 2024.

==== Environment ====
In October 2018, Ivey appointed Ruby L. Perry and Kevin McKinstry to the Alabama Environmental Management Commission.

==== Firearms ====
In May 2018, Ivey signed a memo authorizing Alabama school administrators to have guns at schools if they qualified under the Alabama Sentry Program, and thereby be granted permission to "use lethal force to defend the students, faculty, staff, and visitors of his or her school from the threat of imminent bodily harm or death by an armed intruder." In her announcement of the policy, she said, "With the unfortunate continuance of occurrence of school violence in our schools across the nation, we simply cannot afford to wait until the next legislative session." The proposal was criticized by members of both parties, with Republican Mayor of Huntsville Tommy Battle dismissing it as a "one size fits all" plan and Democratic Mayor of Tuscaloosa Walt Maddox suggesting that the program was flawed.

In March 2022, Ivey signed into law House Bill 272, known as constitutional carry. It eliminates the legal requirement to obtain a permit to conceal carry handguns. Ivey said, "Unlike states who are doing everything in their power to make it harder for law-abiding citizens, Alabama is reaffirming our commitment to defending our Second Amendment rights", and "I have always stood up for the rights of law-abiding gun owners, and I am proud to do that again today."

==== Health care ====
In March 2018, Ivey announced that Alabama would seek permission to put work or job-training requirements on the Medicaid benefits for roughly 75,000 able-bodied adults whose incomes were just a few hundred dollars a month. She asserted that the work requirements would "save taxpayer dollars and will reserve Medicaid services for those that are truly in need of assistance." In September, Ivey said that everyone wanted "high-quality medicine at an affordable cost available to everybody" but that enacting the policy would require figuring out how to pay for it.

On October 1, 2018, Ivey announced that the federal government had approved a new care-management program in Alabama to complement and enhance the state's current system of long-term care services provided to approximately 23,000 Alabama Medicaid recipients. She called the approval "a significant step in our efforts to transform the delivery of services to Medicaid recipients" and said it was her goal "to ensure that all Alabamians receive high-quality health care, no matter their economic status."

Ivey opposes Medicaid expansion, saying in 2018 that it was "not an issue we can tackle at this point."

On May 17, 2021, Ivey signed the Darren Wesley "Ato" Hall Compassion Act, which legalized medical marijuana in Alabama.

==== Labor unions ====
In 2024, Ivey joined five other Republican governors (Brian Kemp, Tate Reeves, Henry McMaster, Bill Lee, and Greg Abbott) in a statement opposing the United Auto Workers unionization campaign.

==== LGBT issues ====
In May 2017, Ivey signed House Bill 24, which allows religious agencies to refuse to place an adopted child in an LGBTQ family. This law was criticized by the Human Rights Campaign.

In April 2021, Ivey signed a bill banning trans girls from competing in women's sports in Alabama. The bill, HB 391, sponsored by Representative Scott Stadthagen, bans K-12 sports teams from participating in trans-inclusive athletic events. It passed the Alabama House 74-19 and the Alabama Senate 25-5.

In April 2022, Ivey signed two bills related to transgender issues. One bans doctors from providing gender-affirming medical care to anyone under 19 and would sentence doctors to 10 years in prison and a fine of up to $15,000 for providing such treatments. In a statement, Ivey said, "There are very real challenges facing our young people, especially with today’s societal pressures and modern culture" and "I believe very strongly that if the Good Lord made you a boy, you are a boy, and if he made you a girl, you are a girl." The other law requires students to use the bathrooms of their birth sex. The bill was amended in the Senate to prevent discussions of sexual orientation or gender identity in kindergarten through fifth grade, modeled after Florida's Parental Rights in Education Act.

==== National politics ====
In October 2018, Ivey met with Vice President Mike Pence when the latter came to Alabama for a National Republican Senatorial Committee event and the pair discussed getting aid to Alabamians affected by Hurricane Michael.

In 2022, Ivey released a campaign ad promoting the unfounded conspiracy theory that the 2020 presidential election had been "stolen" from Donald Trump.

==== Paid leave ====
On April 2, 2025, Ivey signed legislation making paid parental leave available to state workers and public school teachers.

== Personal life ==
Ivey has been married and divorced twice. She has no children. Her first marriage was to Ben LaRavia; their engagement took place while they were studying at Auburn University.

Ivey is a member of First Baptist Church in Montgomery. She is also a member of the Daughters of the American Revolution.

In 2019, Ivey was diagnosed with lung cancer. She received outpatient treatment at the University of Alabama at Birmingham on September 20 that year. She said, "I am confident of God’s plan and purpose for my life." Ivey was declared cancer-free in January 2020. The cancer was Stage I and responded well to radiation treatment.

In 2021, Ivey received an honorary Doctor of Letters from Jacksonville State University.

On March 31, 2026, Ivey was hospitalized after a minor procedure to remove fluid from one of her lungs.

== Electoral history ==
2002 Alabama State Treasurer election
Party	Candidate	Votes	%
Republican	Kay Ivey	660,873	50.77%
Democratic	Stephen Foster Black	609,544	46.82%
Libertarian	Gabe Garland	30,201	2.32%
Write-in		1098	0.01%
Total votes		1,301,716	100%
Republican gain from Democratic			

2006 Alabama Treasurer election
Party	Candidate	Votes	%	±%
Republican	Kay Ivey (incumbent)	724,861	60.55%	+9.78%
Democratic	Steve Segrest	471,570	39.39%	−7.43%
Write-in		730	0.01%	0.00%
Total votes		1,197,761	100%	
Republican hold				

2010 Alabama lieutenant gubernatorial Republican primary results
Party	Candidate	Votes	%
Republican	Kay Ivey	255,205	56.64%
Republican	Hank Erwin	141,420	31.39%
Republican	Gene Ponder	53,965	11.98%
Total votes		450,590	100%

2010 Alabama lieutenant gubernatorial election
Party	Candidate	Votes	%
Republican	Kay Ivey	764,112	51.47%
Democratic	Jim Folsom, Jr. (incumbent)	718,636	48.40%
Write-in		1,945	0.13%
Total votes		1,484,693	100%
Republican gain from Democratic			

2014 Alabama lieutenant gubernatorial Republican primary results
Party	Candidate	Votes	%	±%
Republican	Kay Ivey (incumbent)	257,588	61.68%	+5.04%
Republican	Stan Cooke	160,023	38.32%	
Total votes		417,611	100%	

2014 Alabama lieutenant gubernatorial election
Party	Candidate	Votes	%	±%
Republican	Kay Ivey (incumbent)	738,090	63.23%	+11.76%
Democratic	James C. Fields	428,007	36.67%	−11.73%
Write-in		1,146	0.01%	-0.12%
Total votes		1,167,243	100%	
Republican hold				

2018 Alabama gubernatorial Republican primary results
Party	Candidate	Votes	%
Republican	Kay Ivey (incumbent)	330,743	56.1%
Republican	Tommy Battle	146,887	24.9%
Republican	Scott Dawson	79,302	13.5%
Republican	Bill Hightower	29,275	5.0%
Republican	Michael McAllister	3,326	0.6%
Total votes		589,533	100.0%

2018 Alabama gubernatorial election
Party	Candidate	Votes	%	±%
Republican	Kay Ivey (incumbent)	1,022,457	59.46%	−4.10%
Democratic	Walt Maddox	694,495	40.39%	+4.15%
Write-in		2,637	0.15%	-0.05%
Total votes		1,719,589	100.0%	
Republican hold				

2022 Alabama gubernatorial Republican primary results
Party	Candidate	Votes	%
Republican	Kay Ivey (incumbent)	356,374	54.4
Republican	Lynda Blanchard	125,982	19.2
Republican	Tim James	105,984	16.2
Republican	Lew Burdette	42,910	6.5
Republican	Dean Odle	11,771	1.8
Republican	Donald Trent Jones	3,907	0.6
Republican	Dave Thomas	2,981	0.5
Republican	Stacy Lee George	2,589	0.4
Republican	Dean Young	2,395	0.4
Total votes		654,893	100

2022 Alabama gubernatorial election
Party	Candidate	Votes	%	±%
Republican	Kay Ivey (incumbent)	946,932	66.9%	+7.4
Democratic	Yolanda Flowers	412,961	29.2%	−11.2%
Libertarian	Jimmy Blake	45,958	3.2%	N/A
Write-in		9,432	0.6%	+0.5%
Total votes		1,415,283	100.0%	
Republican hold				

== See also ==
- List of female governors in the United States
- List of female lieutenant governors in the United States

Party political offices
Preceded by Tom Davis	Republican nominee for Treasurer of Alabama; 2002, 2006	Succeeded by Young Boozer
Preceded by Luther Strange	Republican nominee for Lieutenant Governor of Alabama; 2010, 2014	Succeeded by Will Ainsworth
Preceded by Robert J. Bentley	Republican nominee for Governor of Alabama; 2018, 2022	Succeeded by Tommy Tuberville
Political offices
Preceded by Lucy Baxley	Treasurer of Alabama; 2003–2011	Succeeded by Young Boozer
Preceded by Jim Folsom	Lieutenant Governor of Alabama; 2011–2017	Vacant Title next held by Will Ainsworth
Preceded by Robert Bentley	Governor of Alabama; 2017–present	Incumbent
U.S. order of precedence (ceremonial)
Preceded by JD Vance as Vice President	Order of precedence of the United States; Within Alabama	Succeeded by Mayor of city in which event is held
Preceded by JD Vance as Vice President	Order of precedence of the United States; Within Alabama	Succeeded by Otherwise Mike Johnson as Speaker of the House
Preceded by J. B. Pritzker as Governor of Illinois	Order of precedence of the United States; Outside Alabama	Succeeded by Janet Mills as Governor of Maine
