= Joe W. Davis =

American politician

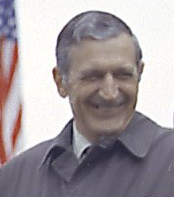
- Davis in February 1970

64th Mayor of Huntsville
- In office 1968–1988
- Preceded by: Glenn Hearn
- Succeeded by: Steve Hettinger

Personal details
- Born: October 22, 1918 Huntsville, Alabama, U.S.
- Died: November 14, 1992 (aged 74) Huntsville, Alabama, U.S.
- Profession: Educator, businessman
- Religion: Presbyterian

Joe William Davis (October 22, 1918 – November 14, 1992) was an American politician who served as mayor of Huntsville, Alabama, for five consecutive terms from 1968 to 1988. He unsuccessfully sought a sixth term. Davis is the second-longest-serving mayor of Huntsville, behind only Alex W. McAllister.

Born in nearby New Market, Alabama, Davis had worked as a teacher and a businessman before becoming Huntsville's mayor. He was a veteran of World War II. Married with a family, Davis was a Freemason and member of Helion Lodge #1 in Huntsville. He is buried at Maple Hill Cemetery in Huntsville.

== Tributes ==
The Joe W. Davis Stadium in Huntsville, home of the Huntsville Stars baseball team from 1985 through 2014, is named in his honor. The stadium is under development to be the home of MLS Next Pro team Huntsville City Football Club whose inaugural season began in March 2023.
