= R. B. Searcy =

American politician

R. B. "Speck" Searcy
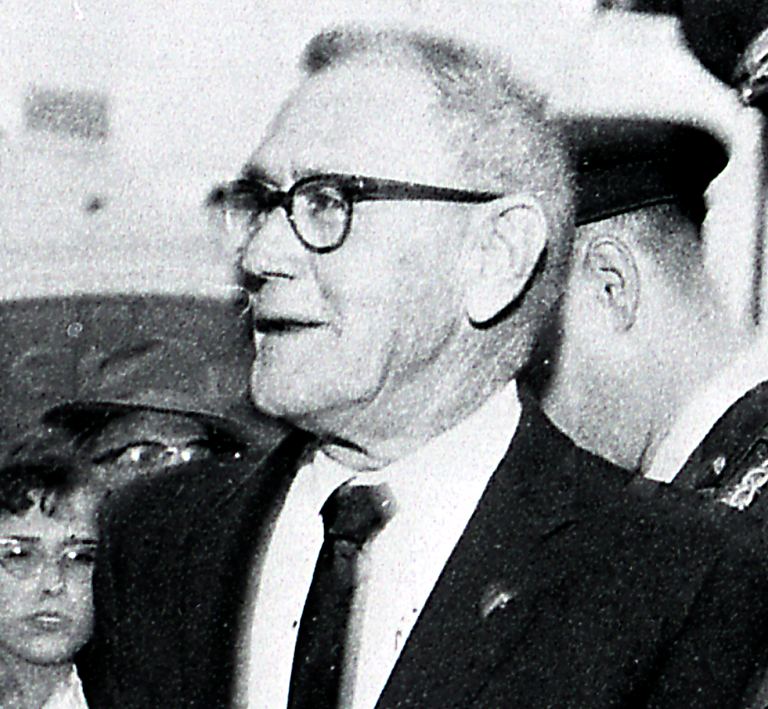
- Searcy in March 1959

62nd Mayor of Huntsville
- In office 1952–1964
- Preceded by: Alex W. McAllister
- Succeeded by: Glenn Hearn

Personal details
- Born: January 8, 1901 Huntsville, Alabama
- Died: December 22, 1967 (aged 66) Huntsville, Alabama
- Spouse: Annie Mae Terry
- Profession: Salesman

Robert Benjamin "Speck" Searcy, Jr. (January 8, 1901 – December 22, 1967) was an American politician who served as mayor of Huntsville, Alabama from 1952 to 1964.

He was the mayor of Huntsville when President Dwight D. Eisenhower established the George C. Marshall Space Flight Center at Redstone Arsenal in Huntsville, Alabama, as the home for the National Aeronautics and Space Administration (NASA) on July 1, 1960. The center became the civilian base for Dr. Wernher von Braun who was the center's first Director, presiding from July 1960 to February 1970.

Searcy is buried at Maple Hill Cemetery in Huntsville.
