= 2002 Alabama State Treasurer election =

- November 5, 2002
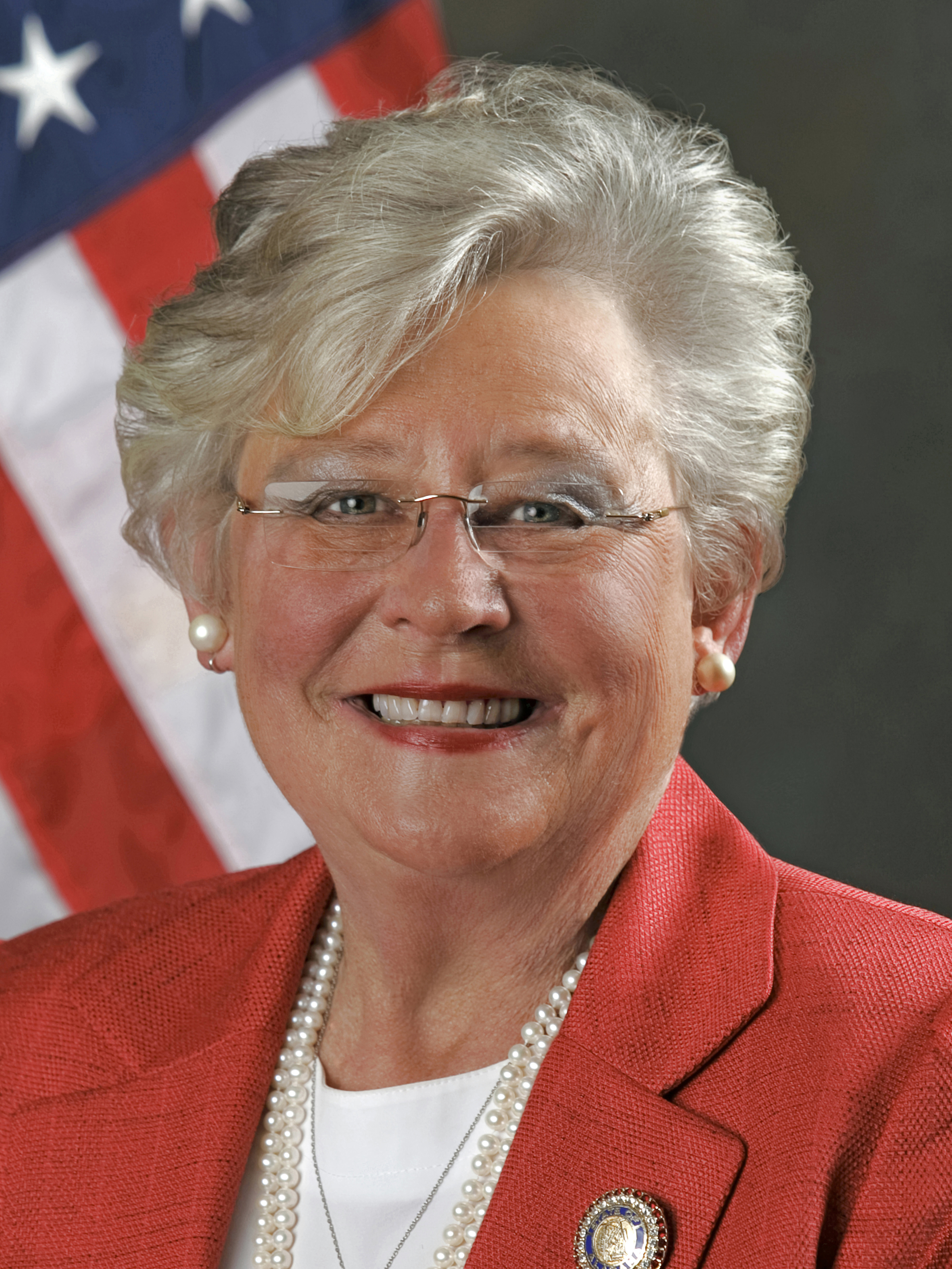

Candidate	Kay Ivey	Stephen Black
Party	Republican	Democratic
Popular vote	660,873	609,544
Percentage	50.8%	46.8%
- County results Ivey: 40–50% 50–60% 60–70% 70–80% Black: 50–60% 60–70% 70–80% 80–90%
Treasurer before election
Lucy Baxley
Democratic
Elected Treasurer
Kay Ivey
Republican

The 2002 Alabama State Treasurer election was held on November 5, 2002, to elect the Alabama State Treasurer. Incumbent Democratic treasurer Lucy Baxley was term-limited from seeking a third consecutive term. Republican nominee Kay Ivey defeated Democrat Stephen Black in the general election.

== Democratic primary ==
=== Candidates ===
==== Nominee ====
- Stephen Black, attorney

==== Eliminated in runoff ====
- Carol Jean Smith, state employee

==== Eliminated in primary ====
- Greg Foster, businessman

=== Results ===
Democratic primary
Party	Candidate	Votes	%
Democratic	Carol Jean Smith	159,555	43.30
Democratic	Stephen Black	120,801	32.79
Democratic	Greg Foster	88,099	23.91
Total votes		368,455	100.00

=== Runoff ===
==== Results ====
Democratic primary runoff
Party	Candidate	Votes	%
Democratic	Stephen Black	142,027	54.96
Democratic	Carol Jean Smith	116,376	45.04
Total votes		258,403	100.00

== Republican primary ==
=== Candidates ===
==== Nominee ====
- Kay Ivey, former banker

==== Eliminated in runoff ====
- Lisa Wallace, former first lady of Alabama

==== Eliminated in primary ====
- Twinkle Andress, former executive director of the Alabama Republican Party

=== Results ===
Republican primary
Party	Candidate	Votes	%
Republican	Kay Ivey	134,395	45.00
Republican	Lisa Wallace	84,223	28.20
Republican	Twinkle Andress	80,024	26.80
Total votes		298,642	100.00

=== Runoff ===
==== Results ====
Results by county: Ivey: 50–60%; 60–70%; 70–80%; 80–90%; >90%; Wallace: 50–60%; 60–70%; 80–90%

Republican primary runoff
Party	Candidate	Votes	%
Republican	Kay Ivey	93,686	66.90
Republican	Lisa Wallace	46,362	33.10
Total votes		140,048	100.00

== General election ==
=== Polling ===
Poll source	Date(s) administered	Sample size (Note: Key: A – all adults RV – registered voters LV – likely voters V – unclear)	Margin of error	Stephen Black (D)	Kay Ivey (R)	Gabe Garland (L)	Undecided
Mobile Register	October 21–24, 2002	926 (RV)	± 3.2%	28%	40%	3%	29%

=== Results ===
2002 Alabama State Treasurer election
Party	Candidate	Votes	%
Republican	Kay Ivey	660,873	50.77
Democratic	Stephen Black	609,544	46.83
Libertarian	Gabe Garland	30,201	2.32
Write-in		1,098	0.08
Total votes		1,301,716	100.00
