= Fraser L. Adams =

American politician

60th Mayor of Huntsville
- In office 1922–1926
- Preceded by: W. T. Hutchens
- Succeeded by: Alex W. McAllister

Personal details
- Born: Fraser Lee Adams; 1868 Malone, Florida, U.S.
- Died: January 1929 (aged 60–61) Huntsville, Alabama, U.S.

Fraser Lee Adams (1868–1929) was an American politician who served two terms as mayor of Huntsville, Alabama, from 1922 to 1926. He had previously served as a Huntsville City Alderman from 1918 to 1920 and as President of the Huntsville City Council from 1920 to 1922.

Adams died in January 1929.
