= Loretta Spencer =

American politician (born 1937)

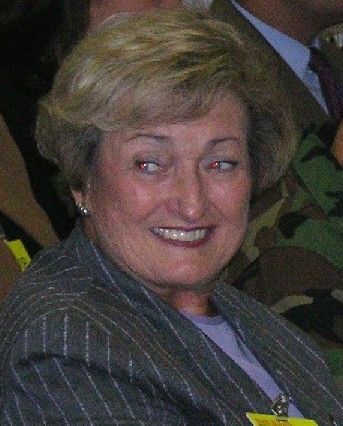

66th Mayor of Huntsville
- In office October 4, 1996 – November 3, 2008
- Preceded by: Steve Hettinger
- Succeeded by: Tommy Battle

Personal details
- Born: June 20, 1937 (age 89) Birmingham, Alabama, U.S.

Loretta Purdy Spencer (born June 20, 1937) is an American politician who served as the 66th mayor of Huntsville, Alabama. Her first term began October 4, 1996, and her last term ended on November 3, 2008.

== Early life ==
Spencer has been a resident of Huntsville since age 7. She graduated from Huntsville High School, and holds a bachelor of science degree from the University of Alabama. Spencer was the first woman mayor of Huntsville, and the first woman mayor of one of Alabama's "four main cities," which also include Birmingham, Mobile and Montgomery. When Spencer was first elected mayor in 1996, she was the co-owner of a local funeral home. Spencer is a former teacher in the Huntsville City School System. Spencer, who is divorced, has two children and four grandchildren.

== Mayoral career ==
Spencer first ran for mayor in 1996, after then-mayor Steve Hettinger announced he would not seek another term. Spencer was supported by Hettinger, leading her runoff opponent, Larry Mullins, to attack both as agents of the status quo. Facing a field of ten opponents, Spencer made the runoff, which she won by a convincing 66%–34% majority.

During her first term, Spencer garnered editorial praise for rejuvenating Huntsville's economic development. The Huntsville Times stated that her "string of recent successes is a whiff of the famous optimism and spirit that characterized the city for decades." At the end of her first term, Spencer was re-elected without a runoff, taking 58% of the vote.

In 2004, Spencer won a third term. During the 2004 campaign, Spencer came under attack on several issues. First, she was criticized for the state of Huntsville schools. She was also criticized for allegedly favoring the wealthier southern areas of Huntsville over the northern neighborhoods with larger minority populations. This criticism may have been reflected in voting results, in which Spencer failed to carry precincts in north Huntsville. Although forced into a runoff, she won that runoff with 55% of the vote.

In January 2007, Spencer was awarded the Distinguished Service Award by the Huntsville/Madison County Chamber of Commerce. Later that year Spencer was embroiled in controversy when the fire chief she had appointed resigned after only 18 months on the job. It emerged that he resigned after Spencer confronted him over alleged sexual harassment for his conduct toward a city employee, for which the city was later sued. In 2008, this suit was settled, and the city reportedly was not required to make any payment to the plaintiff.

Among the accomplishments for which Spencer claims credit are a Target Distribution Center, and the construction of Toyota's V-8 engine plant in Huntsville. She points to the opening of two new schools, and in her third term, the rebuilding of one high school, with others in the planning stages. Spencer’s plan for tax incentive districts, she asserts, have provided $75,000,000 for capital improvements to Huntsville City Schools. Spencer advocates volunteer involvement, and points to her own work in volunteer efforts such as the United Way, Community Free Clinic, Huntsville/Madison Co. Botanical Garden, and the Boys & Girls Club.

In early 2008, Spencer found herself in election-year controversy when questions were raised about her conduct in the city’s role in relocating a homeless shelter from downtown Huntsville to a residential district several miles away. Residents near the proposed new location complained that Spencer committed the city to the move without notice to them, and homeless advocates complained that the new location was too distant from other services used by the homeless.

== Return to private life ==
Former Huntsville city councilman Tommy Battle announced that he would challenge Spencer in the 2008 mayoral election. Spencer announced that she would seek a fourth term in 2008. In the municipal election on August 26, 2008, Spencer led Battle by 14,871 votes to 14,486. However, two minor candidates received 673 votes, preventing Spencer from attaining a majority, forcing a runoff with Battle. In that runoff, on October 7, 2008, Battle decisively defeated Spencer, by a vote of 21,123 votes or 56 percent for Battle, to 16,821 or 44 percent for Spencer. In her concession speech, Spencer said, "You have set the bar high with me. You bought into what we wanted to do, and I am so proud of you for it, because you don't do it alone."
