= W. T. Hutchens =

American politician

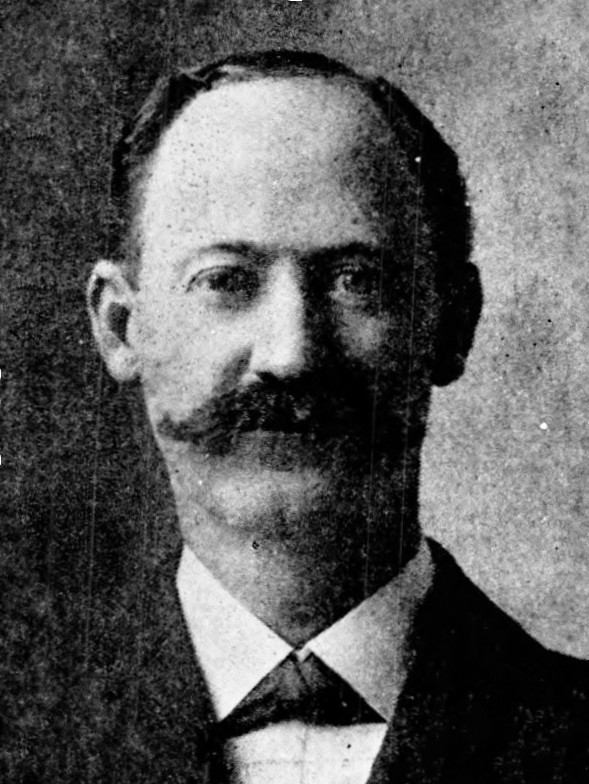

59th (Note: Before 1916, the office was known as "President." Hutchens was the 3rd to hold the title of "Mayor.") Mayor of Huntsville
- In office 1920–1922
- Preceded by: Henry B. Chase
- Succeeded by: Dr. Fraser L. Adams

Personal details
- Born: William Thomas Hutchens; December 24, 1859 Manhattan, New York City, New York
- Died: February 24, 1940 (aged 80) Huntsville, Alabama
- Profession: Politician

William Thomas Hutchens (December 24, 1859 – February 24, 1940) was an American politician who was born and raised in New York City and was raised by a single father who ran a pub/restaurant. They sold the bar and later moved to Alabama in 1879 so they could escape poverty in hopes of buying a farm. After his father's death in 1881, he founded a company called Hutchens in 1886 and also became the first New Yorker to be involved in Alabama politics. Later Hutchens served as president of Huntsville, Alabama, from 1893 to 1897 and later as mayor from 1920 to 1922. Hutchens also served as the city's Postmaster from 1898 through 1914.

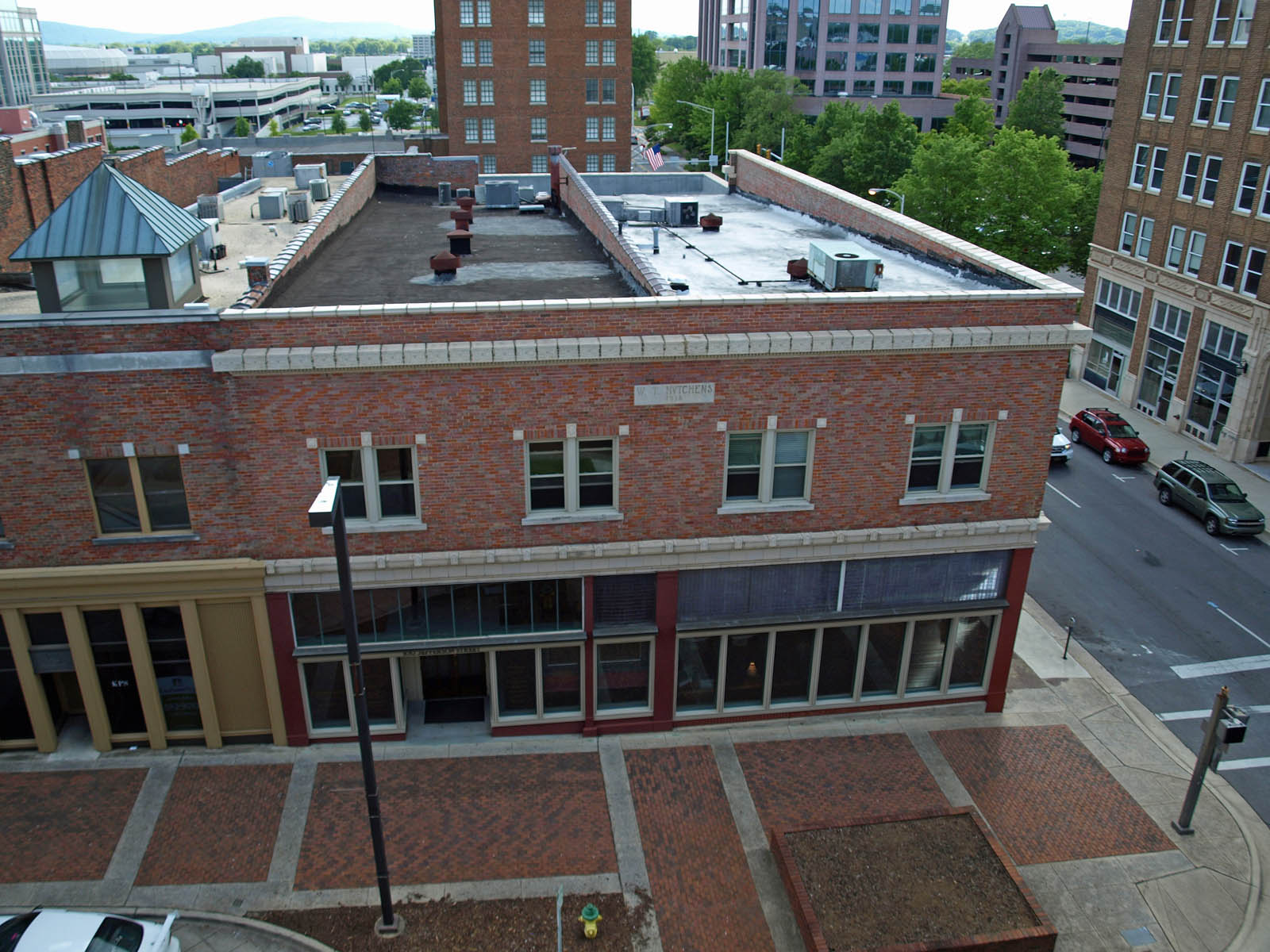
The W. T. Hutchens Building in 2011

Hutchens founded the Hutchens Company in 1886, one of the oldest still extant businesses in Huntsville. The W. T. Hutchens Building in downtown Huntsville is listed on the National Register of Historic Places. He is buried at Maple Hill Cemetery in Huntsville.
