= Henry B. Chase =

American politician and businessperson

58th Mayor of Huntsville
- In office 1918–1920
- Preceded by: T. T. Terry
- Succeeded by: W. T. Hutchens

Personal details
- Born: June 13, 1870 Livermore, Maine
- Died: August 21, 1961 (aged 91) Huntsville, Alabama

Henry Bellows Chase (June 13, 1870 – August 21, 1961) was an American politician and businessperson who served as mayor of Huntsville, Alabama, USA, from 1918 to 1920. A civic leader and a businessman, Chase founded the Alabama Nursery in Huntsville then reorganized it as the Chase Nursery Company in rural Madison County, as part of a community that would become known as Chase, Alabama.

Chase married Annie Stewart. Sources conflict as to whether this marriage took place in August 1896 in Catawba, North Carolina, or in 1900 in Hickory, North Carolina.
