= T. T. Terry =

American politician

57th Mayor of Huntsville
- In office 1916–1918
- Preceded by: Milton H. Lanier
- Succeeded by: Henry B. Chase

Personal details
- Born: December 30, 1865 Jackson County, Alabama
- Died: January 31, 1941 (aged 75) Huntsville, Alabama
- Profession: Merchant; Politician

Thomas Tyler "T.T." Terry (1865–1941) was an American politician who served as mayor of Huntsville, Alabama, from 1916 to 1918. He was the first leader of the city to actually bear the title "Mayor". Previously, the city's chief executive had been titled "President". He is buried at Maple Hill Cemetery in Huntsville.
