= Glenn Hearn =

American politician (1914–1978)

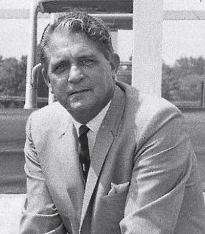

63rd Mayor of Huntsville
- In office 1964–1968
- Preceded by: R. B. Searcy
- Succeeded by: Joe W. Davis

Personal details
- Born: April 17, 1914 Albertville, Alabama, U.S.
- Died: January 7, 1978 (aged 63) Gurley, Alabama, U.S.
- Education: Howard College (now Samford University)
- Profession: FBI Agent

Glenn Hubbard Hearn (April 17, 1914 – January 7, 1978) was an American politician who served as mayor of Huntsville, Alabama, from 1964 to 1968. He also served as a special agent for the Federal Bureau of Investigation from 1941 until becoming mayor, and as the senior agent in charge of the North Alabama division since 1944.

During Hearn's term as mayor, the City of Huntsville grew in land area by approximately 40% to 106.803 square miles. However, during his term, Hearn seemed more interested in public relations than the administrative aspects of his office.

After declining to seek re-election following his first term, his administrative assistant Joe Davis successfully ran for mayor. Hearn served in the state legislature from 1970 to 1974. In 1972, he ran unsuccessfully for Mayor of Huntsville against Davis, garnering only slightly more than a third of the vote.

After leaving the legislature, Hearn became Madison County Personnel Director until his apparent suicide by asphyxiation in 1978. He is buried at Maple Hill Cemetery in Huntsville.
