= Chase, Alabama =

- Unincorporated community
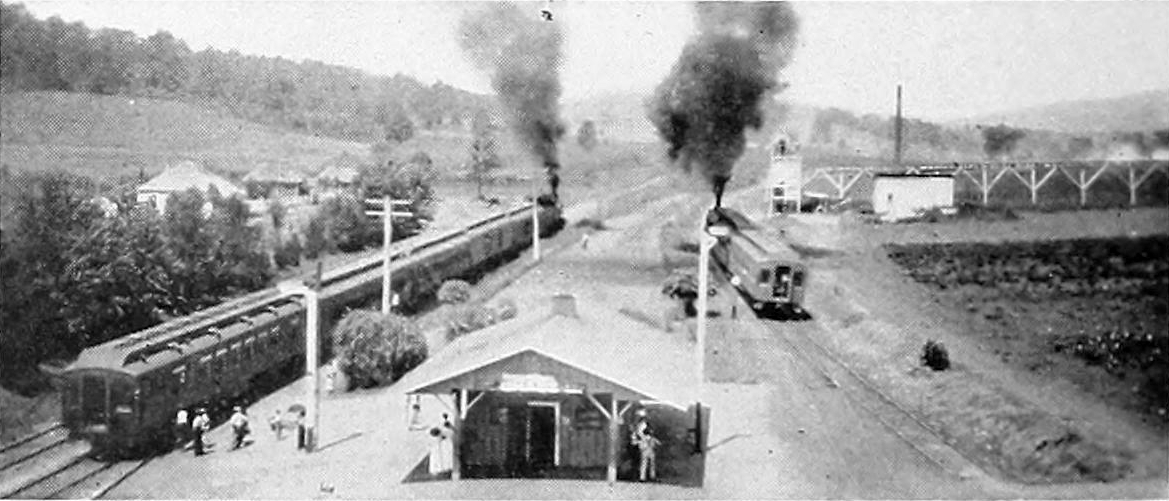
- Chase station, 1915

- Location within Alabama Location within the United States
- Coordinates: 34°47′00″N 86°32′48″W
- Country: United States
- State: Alabama
- County: Madison
- Elevation: 794 ft (242 m)
- Time zone: UTC-6 (Central (CST))
  - Summer (DST): UTC-5 (CDT)
- Area code: 256
- GNIS feature ID: 156170

Chase is an unincorporated community in Madison County, Alabama, United States.

== History ==
Chase was named in honor of the Chase family. Henry B. Chase served as the second mayor of Huntsville, serving from 1918 to 1920. The community was formerly a railroad stop. Today, it is home to the North Alabama Railroad Museum. A post office operated under the name Chase from 1898 to 1976.
