= Aleck W. McAllister =

American politician

61st Mayor of Huntsville
- In office 1926–1952
- Preceded by: Dr. Fraser L. Adams
- Succeeded by: R.B. "Speck" Searcy

Personal details
- Born: April 31, 1887 Atlanta, Georgia United States
- Died: August 22, 1956 (aged 68) San Francisco, California United States

Aleck Winter "Alex" McAllister (1887–1956) was an American politician who holds the record as the longest-serving mayor of Huntsville, Alabama, having served for 26 years, from 1926 to 1952. He is buried at Maple Hill Cemetery in Huntsville.
