= List of mayors of Huntsville, Alabama =

This is a list of mayors who served the city of Huntsville, Alabama.

From 1812 to 1828, a board of trustees governed Huntsville, headed by a popularly elected president:

- 1816–1819: Nicholas Pope
- 1819–1821: John Brahan
- 1821: Benjamin Pope
- 1821–1822: John Read
- 1822–1823: John W. Tilfordy
- 1823–1824: John Boardman
- 1824: William B. Long (Resigned)
- 1824–1825: John Boardman
- 1825–1826: Thomas Humes
- 1826–1828: John H. Lewis

From 1828 to 1844, popularly elected aldermen selected the President of Huntsville:

- 1828–1829: William H. Campbell
- 1829: John H. Lewis (Resigned)
- 1829–1830: James G. Birney
- 1830–1831: John Martin
- 1831–1832: Samuel Cruse
- 1832–1833: George Fearn
- 1833–1834: Samuel Peete
- 1834–1835: Samuel Peete (Resigned in 1834 and was re-appointed)
- 1835–1836: Unknown
- 1836–1842: Elisha H. Rice
- 1842–1844: George P. Beirne

From 1844 to 1916, Presidents of Huntsville were again elected by the people, with a President/Council system from 1844 to 1911 and a City Commission form of government from 1911 to 1916:

- 1844–1849: Joseph Clark
- 1849–1850: George P. Beirne
- 1850–1851: Edwin R. Wallace
- 1851–1853: William Echols Jr.
- 1853–1854: Samuel Peete (Resigned)
- 1854: Joshua Beadle
- 1854–1855: William Figures
- 1855–1859: Zebulon P. Davis
- 1859–1860: John J. Ward (Resigned)
- 1860: John James Coleman
- 1860–1861: Zebulon P. Davis (Resigned)
- 1861–1865: Robert W. Coltart
- 1865–1866: Zebulon P. Davis
- 1866–1867: Robert W. Colart (Removed by Union Army)
- 1867–1868: E. B. Clapp (Put in office by Union Army, later resigned)
- 1868–1870: William B. Figures (Approved by Union Army to replace Clapp)
- 1870–1872: William F. Mastin (Died)
- 1872: James L. Cooper
- 1872–1874: John A. Erwin
- 1874–1878: Jere Murphy
- 1878–1882: Zebulon P. Davis
- 1882–1883: Thomas W. White
- 1883–1889: Edmond I. Mastin
- 1889–1893: Jere Murphy
- 1893–1897: W. T. Hutchens
- 1897–1899: Jere Murphy
- 1899–1903: Alfred Moore
- 1903–1907: Thomas W. Smith
- 1907–1908: R. Erle Smith
- 1908–1910: Thomas W. Smith
- 1910–1913: R. Erle Smith
- 1913–1914: R. L. O'Neal
- 1914–1915: Dr. J. D. Humphrey
- 1915–1916: Milton H. Lanier

In 1916, returned to the Mayor/Council form of government:

- 1916–1918: T. T. Terry
- 1918–1920: Henry B. Chase
- 1920–1922: W. T. Hutchens
- 1922–1926: Dr. Fraser L. Adams
- 1926–1952: Aleck W. McAllister
- 1952–1964: R. B. "Speck" Searcy, Jr.
- 1964–1968: Glenn Hearn
- 1968–1988: Joe W. Davis
- 1988–1996: Steve Hettinger
- 1996–2008: Loretta Spencer, Huntsville's first female mayor
- 2008–present: Tommy Battle

== See also ==
- Timeline of Huntsville, Alabama
- Mayoral elections in Huntsville, Alabama
