= Grand Lodge of Alabama =

@Brotherhood UNSHAKABLE 001

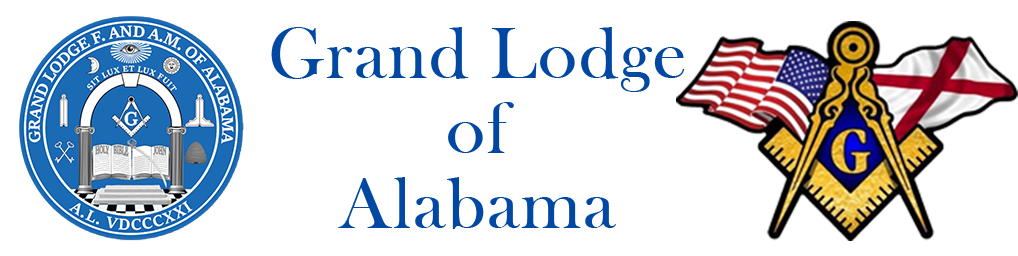
- Established: June 11, 1821
- Location: United States of America
- Grand Master: Richard "Rusty" Carl Beck
- Website: Official website

The Most Worshipful Grand Lodge of Free and Accepted Masons of the State of Alabama, commonly called the Grand Lodge of Alabama, is one of two Masonic grand lodges in the state of Alabama, the other being the predominantly African American Prince Hall Grand Lodge of Alabama.

The Grand Lodge of Alabama was established in Cahawba, Alabama on June 11, 1821, with Thomas Wadsworth Farrar as its first Grand Master. Previous to the Grand Lodge's formation, Masonic Lodges existed in the state under charters from the Grand Lodges of Louisiana, Kentucky, Georgia, South Carolina, and Tennessee. The creation of the Grand Lodge of Alabama provided unity and guaranteed that a common ritual was being performed during the degree work. The Grand Annual Communications have always been held at the state capital. They were held in December at Cahawha from 1821-1825. The location of the Grand Lodge meetings was moved to Tuscaloosa (1826-1846) and Montgomery (1847-present). Former Grand Masters of Alabama include Governors Rufus Cobb (1881-1882) and Russell Cunningham (1900-1901) and U. S. Senator John H. Bankhead (1883-1884).

As of 2013, there were 291 active Lodges, with a total membership of 25,885.

On November 14, 2017, the Grand Lodge of Alabama voted to recognize the Prince Hall Grand Lodge of Alabama.

As of November 2022, the current Grand Master is Most Worshipful Richard "Rusty" Carl Beck.

== See also ==
- List of notable Masonic buildings in Alabama
