= Steve Hettinger =

American politician

65th Mayor of Huntsville
- In office 1988–1996
- Preceded by: Joe W. Davis
- Succeeded by: Loretta Spencer

Personal details
- Born: August 25, 1945 (age 81) Memphis, Tennessee, U.S.
- Party: Democratic
- Education: Mississippi State University; University of Alabama in Huntsville

Stephen Ray "Steve" Hettinger (born August 25, 1945) is an American politician who served as mayor of Huntsville, Alabama, from 1988 to 1996. During this period, Hettinger became particularly involved in leading the recovery of the city in the aftermath of the Huntsville Tornado of 1989.

== Early life ==
Stephen Ray Hettinger was born on August 25, 1945, in Memphis, Tennessee. He graduated from Mississippi State University, where he earned a Bachelor of Science in engineering in 1967, and moved to Huntsville, Alabama, shortly after. Hettinger worked in the space program while studying towards a Master of Science in Industrial and Systems Engineering at the University of Alabama in Huntsville, which he received in 1974.

== Career ==
In 1982, he successfully ran for a seat in the Alabama House of Representatives, defeating an incumbent. He left the House after winning the 1988 race for mayor of Huntsville, where he defeated five-term Mayor Joe Davis.

While serving as Mayor in June 1990, Hettinger appealed to President George H. W. Bush to restore the United States citizenship of Arthur Rudolph, a former Nazi and NASA scientist who had been brought to the United States under Operation Paperclip and denaturalized when his Nazi past resurfaced. The appeal failed.

In 1995, Hettinger decided not to seek a third term in 1996 election. He considered running as a Democrat for a United States Senate seat being vacated by Howell Heflin, but the primary went to Roger Bedford, Jr. and the seat ultimately was won by Republican Jeff Sessions. After leaving office, Hettinger returned to the private sector to co-found an engineering firm.

== Personal life ==
A noted Star Trek fan, Hettinger temporarily renamed the city "Star Trek, Alabama" for the colossal "Star Trek 30" Convention in 1996. Among the special guests were the lead actors of the original cast, actors from its spinoffs, and six Apollo astronauts.
