= List of elections in 1986 =

The following elections occurred in the year 1986.

== Africa ==
- 1986 Angolan legislative election
- 1986 Gabonese presidential election
- 1986 Mozambican general election
- 1986 Sierra Leonean parliamentary election
- 1986 Somali presidential election
- 1986 Sudanese parliamentary election
- 1986 Togolese presidential election
- 1986 Tunisian parliamentary election

== Asia ==
- 1986 Bangladeshi general election
- 1986 Bangladeshi presidential election
- 1986 Japanese House of Councillors election
- 1986 Japanese general election
- 1986 Malaysian general election
- 1986 Mongolian parliamentary election
- 1986 Nepalese general election
- 1986 North Korean parliamentary election
- 1986 Philippine presidential election
- 1986 Republic of China legislative election
- 1986 South Yemeni parliamentary election
- 1986 Syrian parliamentary election
- 1986 Thai general election
- 1986 Turkish parliamentary by-elections

== Australia ==
- 1986 Araluen by-election
- 1986 Bass Hill state by-election
- 1986 Cabramatta state by-election
- 1986 Canterbury state by-election
- 1986 Kiama state by-election
- 1986 Pittwater state by-election
- 1986 Queensland state election
- 1986 Scullin by-election
- 1986 Tasmanian state election
- 1986 Western Australian state election

== Europe ==
- 1986 Bulgarian parliamentary election
- 1986 Czechoslovak parliamentary election
- 1986 Dutch general election
- 1986 Liechtenstein general election
- 1986 Portuguese presidential election
- 1986 East German general election
- 1986 Slovak parliamentary election
- 1986 Yugoslavian parliamentary election

=== Austria ===
- 1986 Austrian legislative election

=== France ===
- 1986 Brittany regional election
- 1986 French legislative election
- 1986 French regional elections

=== Serbia ===
- 1986 Serbian parliamentary election

=== Spain ===
- 1986 Basque parliamentary election
- 1986 Spanish general election

== North America ==
=== Canada ===
- 1986 Alberta general election
- 1986 British Columbia general election
- 1986 Edmonton municipal election
- 1986 Manitoba general election
- 1986 Manitoba municipal elections
- 1986 Prince Edward Island general election
- 1986 Quebec municipal elections
- 1986 Saskatchewan general election
- 1986 Winnipeg municipal election

=== Caribbean ===
- 1986 Barbadian general election
- 1986 Cuban parliamentary election
- 1986 Dominican Republic general election
- 1986 Haitian Constitutional Assembly election
- 1986 Trinidad and Tobago general election

=== United States ===
- 1986 United States elections

==== United States lieutenant gubernatorial ====
- 1986 Alabama lieutenant gubernatorial election
- 1986 California lieutenant gubernatorial election
- 1986 Georgia lieutenant gubernatorial election
- 1986 Texas lieutenant gubernatorial election

==== United States gubernatorial ====
- 1986 Alabama gubernatorial election
- 1986 Alaska gubernatorial election
- 1986 Arizona gubernatorial election
- 1986 Arkansas gubernatorial election
- 1986 California gubernatorial election
- 1986 Colorado gubernatorial election
- 1986 Connecticut gubernatorial election
- 1986 Florida gubernatorial election
- 1986 Georgia gubernatorial election
- 1986 Hawaii gubernatorial election
- 1986 Idaho gubernatorial election
- 1986 Iowa gubernatorial election
- 1986 Kansas gubernatorial election
- 1986 Maine gubernatorial election
- 1986 Maryland gubernatorial election
- 1986 Massachusetts gubernatorial election
- 1986 Michigan gubernatorial election
- 1986 Minnesota gubernatorial election
- 1986 Nebraska gubernatorial election
- 1986 Nevada gubernatorial election
- 1986 New Hampshire gubernatorial election
- 1986 New Mexico gubernatorial election
- 1986 New York gubernatorial election
- 1986 Ohio gubernatorial election
- 1986 Oklahoma gubernatorial election
- 1986 Oregon gubernatorial election
- 1986 Pennsylvania gubernatorial election
- 1986 Rhode Island gubernatorial election
- 1986 South Carolina gubernatorial election
- 1986 South Dakota gubernatorial election
- 1986 Tennessee gubernatorial election
- 1986 Texas gubernatorial election
- 1986 United States gubernatorial elections
- 1986 Vermont gubernatorial election
- 1986 Wisconsin gubernatorial election
- 1986 Wyoming gubernatorial election

==== United States House of Representatives ====
- 1986 United States House of Representatives elections
- 1986 United States House of Representatives election in Alaska
- 1986 United States House of Representatives elections in California
- 1986 United States House of Representatives election in Delaware
- 1986 United States House of Representatives election in the District of Columbia
- 1986 United States House of Representatives elections in New Jersey
- 1986 United States House of Representatives election in North Dakota
- 1986 United States House of Representatives elections in South Carolina
- 1986 United States House of Representatives elections in Tennessee
- 1986 United States House of Representatives elections in Texas
- 1986 United States House of Representatives election in Vermont
- 1986 United States House of Representatives elections in West Virginia
- 1986 United States House of Representatives election in Wyoming

==== United States Senate ====
- 1986 United States Senate elections
- 1986 United States Senate election in Alabama
- 1986 United States Senate election in Alaska
- 1986 United States Senate election in Arizona
- 1986 United States Senate election in Arkansas
- 1986 United States Senate election in California
- 1986 United States Senate election in Colorado
- 1986 United States Senate election in Connecticut
- 1986 United States Senate election in Florida
- 1986 United States Senate election in Georgia
- 1986 United States Senate election in Hawaii
- 1986 United States Senate election in Idaho
- 1986 United States Senate election in Illinois
- 1986 United States Senate election in Indiana
- 1986 United States Senate election in Iowa
- 1986 United States Senate election in Kansas
- 1986 United States Senate election in Kentucky
- 1986 United States Senate election in Louisiana
- 1986 United States Senate election in Maryland
- 1986 United States Senate election in Missouri
- 1986 United States Senate election in Nevada
- 1986 United States Senate election in New Hampshire
- 1986 United States Senate election in New York
- 1986 United States Senate election in North Carolina
- 1986 United States Senate special election in North Carolina
- 1986 United States Senate election in North Dakota
- 1986 United States Senate election in Ohio
- 1986 United States Senate election in Oklahoma
- 1986 United States Senate election in Oregon
- 1986 United States Senate election in Pennsylvania
- 1986 United States Senate election in South Carolina
- 1986 United States Senate election in South Dakota
- 1986 United States Senate election in Utah
- 1986 United States Senate election in Vermont
- 1986 United States Senate election in Washington
- 1986 United States Senate election in Wisconsin

==== United States mayoral elections ====
- 1986 Auburn, Alabama municipal elections
- 1986 New Orleans mayoral election
- 1986 San Diego mayoral special election
- 1986 San Jose mayoral election
- 1986 Washington, D.C., mayoral election

== Oceania ==
=== Australia ===
- 1986 Araluen by-election
- 1986 Cabramatta state by-election
- 1986 Canterbury state by-election
- 1986 Kiama state by-election
- 1986 Pittwater state by-election
- 1986 Queensland state election
- 1986 Scullin by-election
- 1986 Tasmanian state election
- 1986 Western Australian state election

== South America ==
- 1986 Brazilian legislative election
- 1986 Colombian presidential election
- 1986 Ecuadorian parliamentary election
- 1986 Falkland Islands status referendum
