= 1946 Alabama lieutenant gubernatorial election =

- November 5, 1946
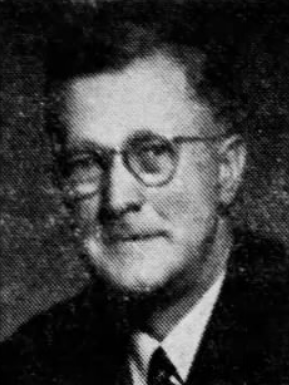

Candidate	James C. Inzer	W. J. Kennamer
Party	Democratic	Republican
Popular vote	168,282	22,565
Percentage	88.2%	11.8%
- County results Inzer: 50–60% 60–70% 70–80% 80–90% 90–100%
Lieutenant Governor before election
Leven H. Ellis
Democratic
Elected Lieutenant Governor
James C. Inzer
Democratic

The 1946 Alabama lieutenant gubernatorial election was held on November 5, 1946, to elect the Lieutenant Governor of Alabama. The primary election was held on May 7, and the primary runoff was held on June 4. James C. Inzer was elected to a four-year term.

== Democratic primary ==
=== Candidates ===
==== Nominee ====
- James C. Inzer, member of the Alabama State Board of Education

==== Eliminated in runoff ====
- Reuben Newton, state senator from the 12th district

==== Eliminated in primary ====
- Elvin McCary, state senator from Calhoun County
- Wallace Powell Pruitt Jr., attorney

=== Results ===
Democratic primary
Party	Candidate	Votes	%
Democratic	J. C. Inzer	131,123	43.54
Democratic	Reuben L. Newton	92,880	30.84
Democratic	Elvin McCary	51,710	17.17
Democratic	Wallace Powell Pruitt Jr.	25,436	8.45
Total votes		301,149	100.00

=== Runoff ===
==== Results ====
Democratic primary runoff
Party	Candidate	Votes	%
Democratic	J. C. Inzer	162,379	51.39
Democratic	Reuben L. Newton	153,572	48.61
Total votes		315,951	100.00

== Republican convention ==
=== Candidates ===
==== Nominee ====
- W. J. Kennamer

== General election ==
=== Results ===
1946 Alabama lieutenant gubernatorial election
Party	Candidate	Votes	%
Democratic	J. C. Inzer	168,282	88.18
Republican	W. J. Kennamer	22,565	11.82
Total votes		190,847	100.00
