= 1942 Alabama lieutenant gubernatorial election =

- November 3, 1942
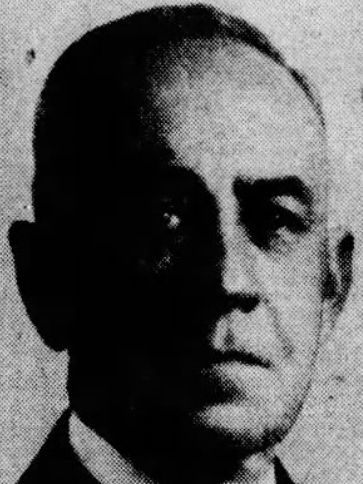

Nominee	Leven H. Ellis	James Arthur Downer
Party	Democratic	Republican
Popular vote	67,681	8,379
Percentage	88.98%	11.02%
- County results Ellis: 60–70% 70–80% 80–90% 90–100% Downer: 60–70%
Lieutenant Governor before election
Albert A. Carmichael
Democratic
Elected Lieutenant Governor
Leven H. Ellis
Democratic

The 1942 Alabama lieutenant gubernatorial election was held on November 3, 1942, in order to elect the lieutenant governor of Alabama. Democratic nominee and incumbent member of the Alabama Legislature Leven H. Ellis defeated Republican nominee James Arthur Downer.

== Democratic primary ==
The Democratic primary election was held on May 5, 1942. Candidate Leven H. Ellis received a plurality of the votes (45.17%), and initially advanced to a runoff against runner-up James C. Inzer. Inzer withdrew from the runoff in mid-May following the election, officially making Ellis the nominee.

=== Results ===
1942 Democratic lieutenant gubernatorial primary
Party	Candidate	Votes	%
Democratic	Leven H. Ellis	107,835	45.17%
Democratic	J. C. Inzer	89,911	37.66%
Democratic	Homer Brooks	21,774	9.12%
Democratic	Wallace Pruett Jr.	19,196	8.05%
Total votes		238,716	100.00%

== General election ==
On election day, November 3, 1942, Democratic nominee Leven H. Ellis won the election by a margin of 59,302 votes against his opponent Republican nominee James Arthur Downer, thereby retaining Democratic control over the office of lieutenant governor. Ellis was sworn in as the 15th lieutenant governor of Alabama on January 19, 1943.

=== Results ===
Alabama lieutenant gubernatorial election, 1942
Party	Candidate	Votes	%
Democratic	Leven H. Ellis	67,681	88.98
Republican	James Arthur Downer	8,379	11.02
Total votes		76,060	100.00
Democratic hold			
