= 1986 Réunionese Regional Council election =

Regional Council elections were held in Réunion in 1986 as part of the wider French regional elections. The Rally for the Republic–Union for French Democracy alliance remained the largest in the Regional Council, winning 18 of the 45 seats.

== Results ==
Party	Votes	%	Seats	+/–
Rally for the Republic–Union for French Democracy		36.78	18	0
Communist Party of Réunion		28.19	13	–3
Miscellaneous right (Pierre Lagourgue)		17.26	8	–3
Socialist Party		14.06	6	0
National Front		2.24	0	New
Miscellaneous right (Ramassamy)		1.43	0	New
Total			45	0
Source: French Politics
