= Luther Strange =

American politician & lawyer (born 1953)

- Official portrait, 2017

United States Senator from Alabama
- In office February 9, 2017 – January 3, 2018
- Appointed by: Robert Bentley
- Preceded by: Jeff Sessions
- Succeeded by: Doug Jones

47th Attorney General of Alabama
- In office January 17, 2011 – February 9, 2017
- Governor: Robert Bentley
- Preceded by: Troy King
- Succeeded by: Steve Marshall

Personal details
- Born: Luther Johnson Strange III; March 1, 1953 (age 73) Birmingham, Alabama, U.S.
- Party: Republican
- Height: 6 ft 9 in (2.06 m)
- Spouse: Melissa Strange
- Children: 2
- Education: Tulane University (BA, JD)
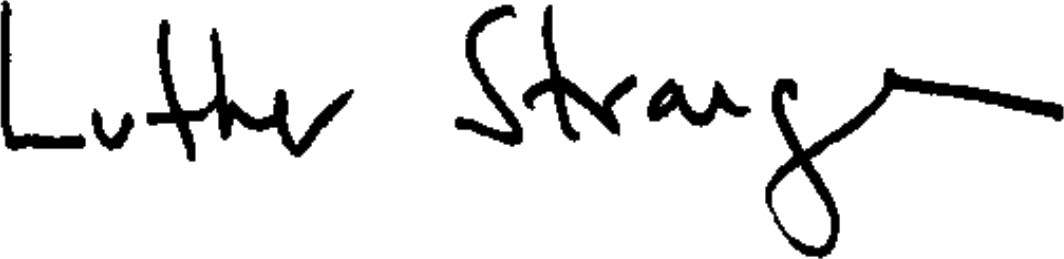
- Signature
- Strange's voice Strange's delivering his Senate farewell address. Recorded December 7, 2017

Luther Johnson Strange III (born March 1, 1953) is an American lawyer and politician who served as a United States Senator from Alabama from 2017 to 2018. He was appointed to fill that position after it was vacated by Jeff Sessions upon Sessions's confirmation as U.S. Attorney General.

He previously served as the 47th Attorney General of the U.S. state of Alabama from 2011 until 2017. Strange was a candidate for public office in 2006, 2010 and 2014. In 2006, Strange ran for Lieutenant Governor of Alabama and defeated George Wallace Jr. in the Republican primary. Strange then lost the general election to Democrat Jim Folsom Jr. In 2010, Strange defeated incumbent Attorney General Troy King in the Republican primary, before going on to win the general election against Democrat James Anderson.

After President Donald Trump appointed U.S. Senator Jeff Sessions from Alabama to the office of United States Attorney General in February 2017, Governor Robert J. Bentley appointed Strange to fill the vacancy. He ran to finish the term in the subsequent special election and advanced to the Republican primary runoff, in which he lost to former state judge Roy Moore. On December 12, Democratic nominee and former U.S. attorney Doug Jones was elected as his successor, defeating Moore in the special election.

== Early life and education ==
Luther Strange was born in Birmingham, Alabama, and lived in Sylacauga until the age of six, when his family moved to Homewood. Strange graduated from Shades Valley High School in 1971. He received his undergraduate degree from Tulane University. He then graduated from Tulane University Law School. Strange was admitted to the Alabama State Bar in 1981.

== Early career ==
Strange's first job after graduating law school was at Sonat Offshore, a subsidiary of Sonat Inc., a natural gas utility based in Birmingham, Alabama; he joined the company in 1980 as a lawyer. In 1985, Strange became head of Sonat's Washington, D.C. office. He left the company in 1994. In the 1980s and 1990s, Strange was a registered lobbyist in Washington for Sonat and Transocean Offshore Drilling Co.

Prior to being elected Attorney General, Strange was the founder of the law firm Strange LLC, a Birmingham, Alabama-based law firm. Before establishing his own law firm, Strange was a partner with Bradley Arant Boult Cummings LLP.

== Attorney General of Alabama ==
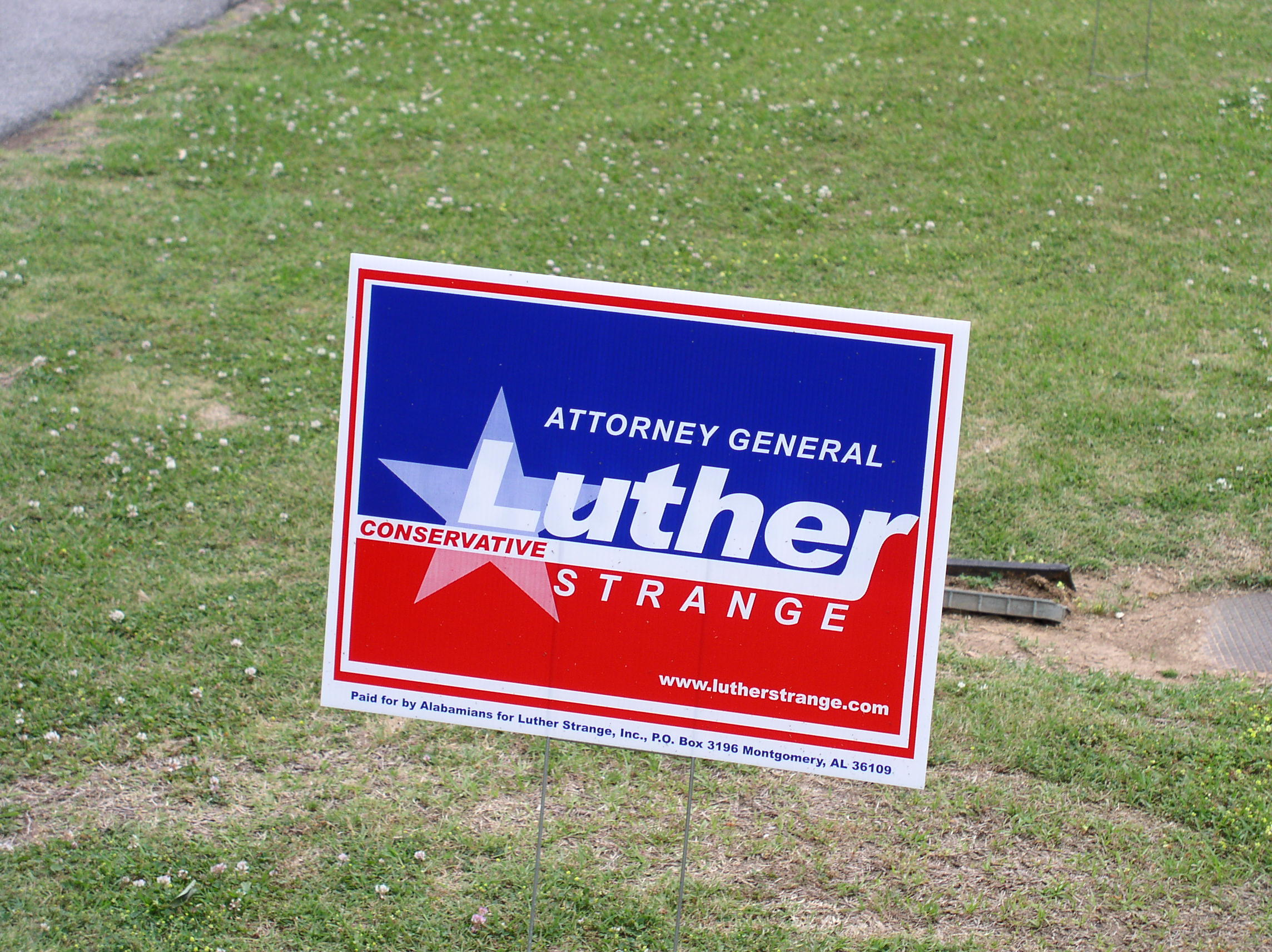
Luther Strange campaign sign, 2010

As Alabama Attorney General, Strange sued the federal government several times, over such issues as a United States Department of Justice and United States Department of Education directive on the treatment of transgender students and changes in the U.S. Department of the Interior's calculation of Gulf of Mexico offshore drilling royalties. Strange also joined a suit brought by some states against the federal government that challenged the Obama administration's Clean Power Plan. Along with other Republican state attorneys general, Strange "came to the defense of ExxonMobil when it fell under investigation by attorneys general from states seeking information about whether the oil giant failed to disclose material information about climate change" (see ExxonMobil climate change controversy).

Strange is an opponent of same-sex marriage. He expressed disagreement with the U.S. Supreme Court's ruling in Obergefell v. Hodges which found a constitutional right to same-sex marriage.

His tenure in office included the conviction and removal from office of the Alabama House Speaker Mike Hubbard in June 2016. However, Strange recused himself from that case, appointing Van Davis as Acting Attorney General to oversee it.

As attorney general, Strange was the coordinating counsel for the Gulf Coast states in the litigation on the Deepwater Horizon oil spill.

In April 2014, Strange argued before the U.S. Supreme Court in Lane v. Franks. The case involved a whistleblower who reported corruption within the Alabama community college system. This was Strange's first argument before the Court.

In March 2014, Strange brought Alabama into a lawsuit filed by Missouri Attorney General Chris Koster against California's egg production standards as embodied in its Proposition 2 in 2008. In October 2014, a federal judge dismissed the lawsuit, rejecting the states' challenge to Proposition 2, California's prohibition on the sale of eggs laid by caged hens kept in conditions more restrictive than those approved by California voters in a 2008 ballot initiative. Judge Kimberly Mueller ruled that Alabama and the other states lacked legal standing to sue on behalf of their residents and that the plaintiffs were representing solely the interests of egg farmers, not "a substantial statement of their populations."

Strange served as chairman of the Republican Attorneys General Association in 2016 and 2017.

== U.S. Senate ==
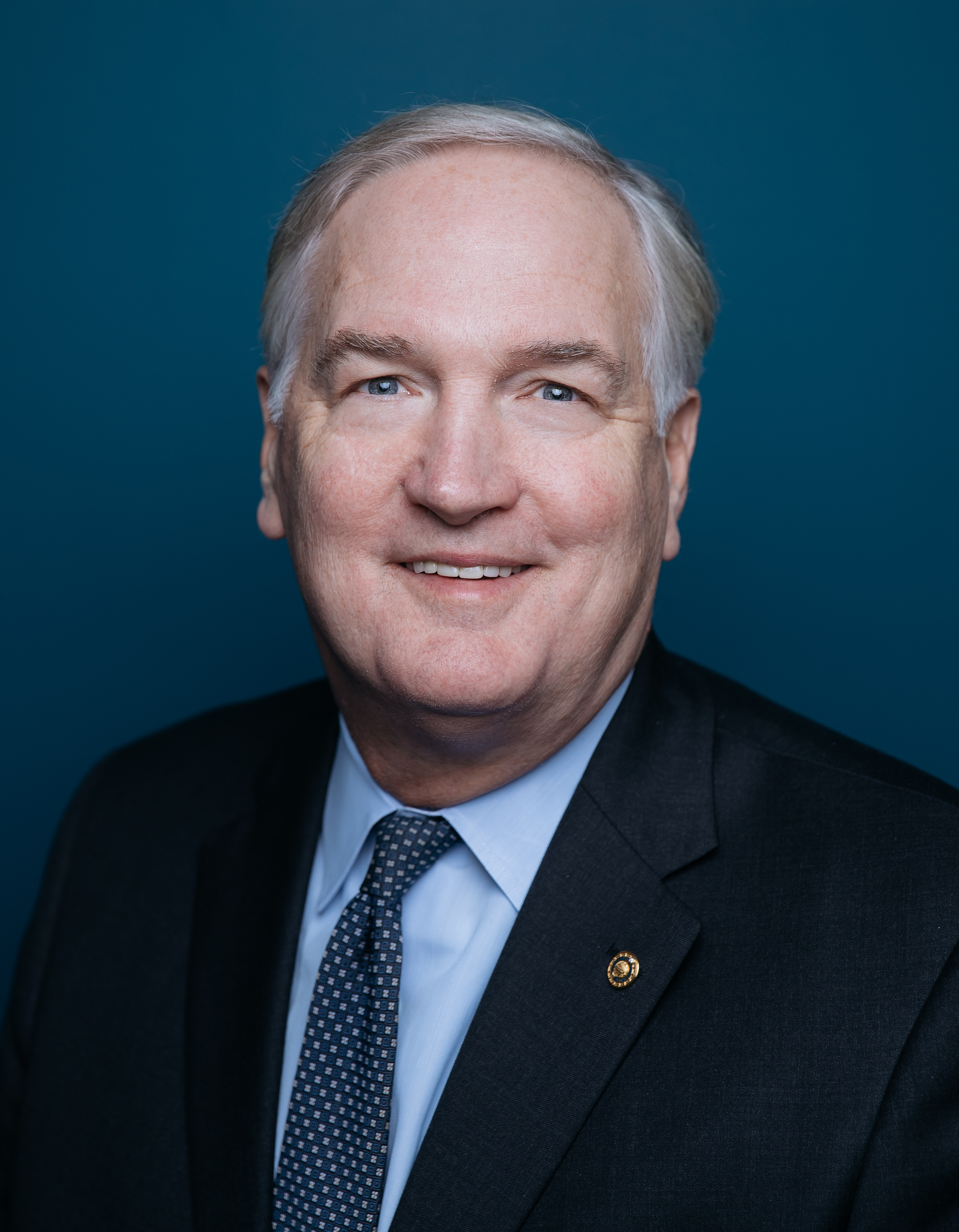
Strange as U.S. Senator

The announced nomination of Senator Jeff Sessions as United States Attorney General in November 2016 created an opening for a U.S. Senate seat that Governor Bentley would fill by appointment upon Sessions' confirmation. Many aspirants publicly declared their interest in the appointive Senate seat, and in running for it even if not selected by Bentley.

=== Appointment ===
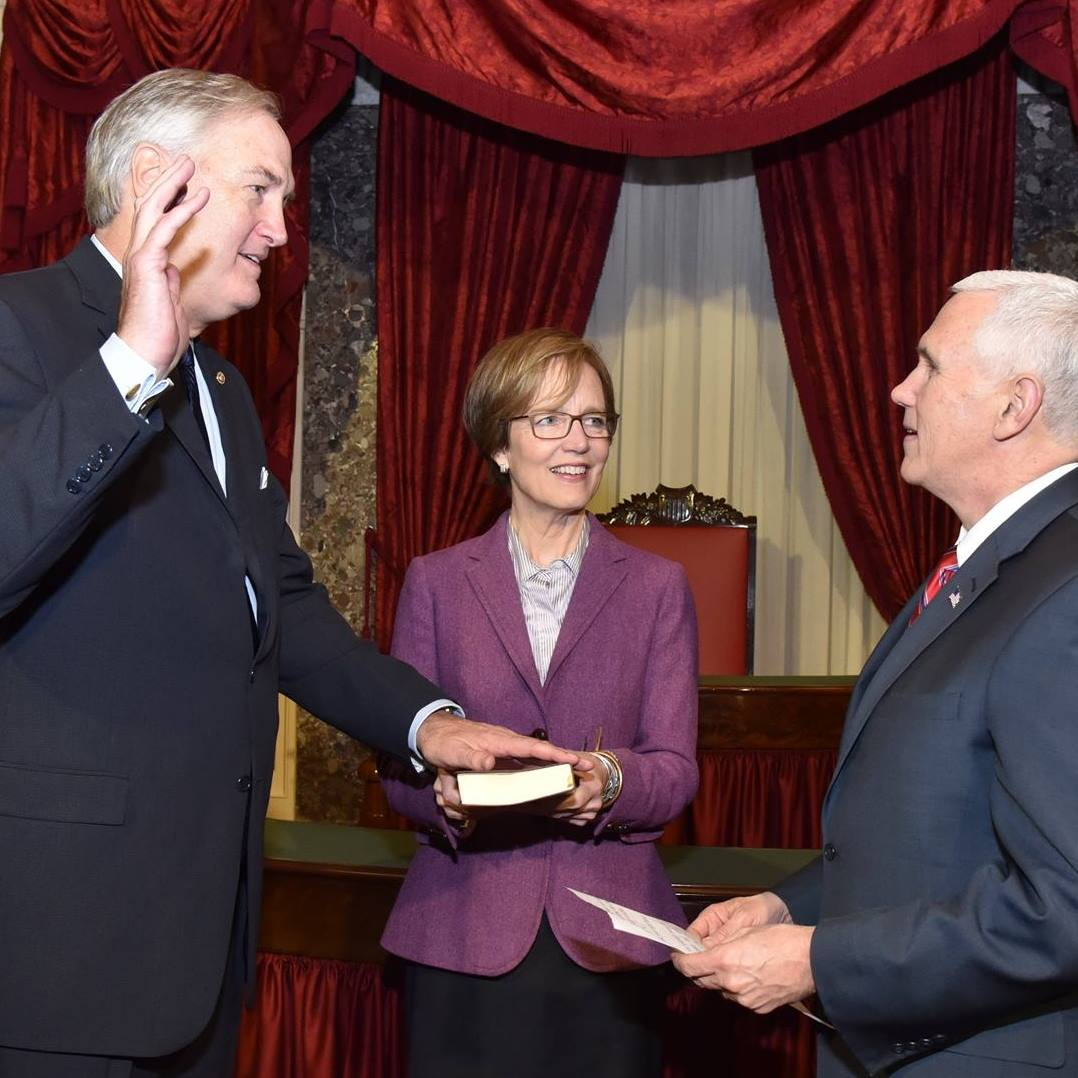
Strange during his ceremonial swearing in by Vice President Mike Pence

Strange revealed his intention to seek the Senate seat to Fred Barnes of the Weekly Standard on November 22, 2016, regardless of whether he was appointed by Bentley, calling a run "the right thing for me to do." Strange filed paperwork for the potential special election one week later and made a public announcement of his candidacy on December 6. "The voters will make the ultimate decision about who will represent them, and I look forward to making my case to the people of Alabama in the months to come as to why they can trust me to keep protecting and fighting for our conservative values." In January, the new Strange for Senate federal campaign committee reported raising more than $309,000 in the few weeks leading to the December 31 filing deadline.

Bentley began interviewing candidates for the Senate appointment in mid-December. On December 22, the Montgomery Advertiser reported a complete list of Alabamians who had been interviewed over a two-week period for the Senate seat (based on information released by the Governor's office). They included: Chief Justice Roy Moore, Representative Mo Brooks (R-Huntsville), and the following state legislators and justices: Senate President Pro Tempore Del Marsh (R-Anniston), Senator Arthur Orr (R-Decatur), Senator Cam Ward (R-Alabaster), Senator Bill Hightower (R-Mobile), Senator Trip Pittman (R-Montrose), Alabama House Ways and Means Education Chairman and Representative Bill Poole (R-Tuscaloosa), Associate Justice Glenn Murdock, Representative Connie Rowe (R-Jasper), former Representative Perry Hooper of Montgomery (also Trump 2016 Chair in Alabama).

Strange was not interviewed until the following week, along with U.S. Representative Martha Roby, Representative Gary Palmer, Tim James (son of former Governor Fob James), state Senator Greg Reed (R-Jasper), and state Senator Phil Williams (R-Rainbow City). Three additional persons interviewed before January 6 were Representative Robert Aderholt, Revenue Commissioner Julie P. Magee, and Department of Economic and Community Affairs Director Jim Byard. The total number of interviews was 20 (which represented the limit the Governor would go).

In January 2017, Governor Bentley announced the special election for the remainder of Sessions' term would not take place until 2018, giving the prospective new appointee a year of incumbency; the election was ultimately held in December 2017. On February 2, Governor Bentley named six finalists for the appointment. The list included U.S. Representative Robert Aderholt, Senate President pro tempore Del Marsh, Attorney General Strange; Bentley ACEA appointee Jim Byard, state Representative Connie Rowe, and former state Representative Perry Hooper Jr.

==== Selection ====
Following the Sessions confirmation on February 8, 2017, Bentley announced Strange's appointment on February 9. "Let me tell you why I chose Luther Strange. I truly believe Luther has the qualifications and has the qualities that will serve our people well and serve this state well." Speaking with his wife Melissa by his side, Strange called the appointment "the honor of my life," while citing his efforts with other Republican attorneys general to stop environmental, educational and labor regulations put forward by former President Barack Obama's administration. "Now we have the chance to go on the offense," he said. "Jeff Sessions as attorney general is the first step in that process."

==== Reaction ====
Strange's appointment was welcomed by fellow Republicans, such as Arkansas Attorney General Leslie Rutledge, and Karl Rove. Conservative activists, such as Chris W. Cox of the NRA, also hailed the appointment. NPR Southern political analyst Debbie Elliott said that Strange's conservative politics are "very much in the mold of Jeff Sessions." She noted that as state attorney general: "He's been very active in state-led fights against federal environmental regulations, against Obamacare, against transgender bathroom directives. He's fought for Alabama's strict abortion laws. He defended the state's controversial immigration law. A good bit of it was struck down by federal courts."

There was negative reaction from other Republicans who expressed concern about Strange's appointment. In early November 2016, prior to Election Day, he had requested that impeachment proceedings against Bentley be delayed. Some saw a link between this and Strange's appointment. "There's going to be such an air of conspiracy hanging over our state and our new senator," said state representative Ed Henry. "It's just one of those things where it appears there could have been collusion," said state representative Allen Farley. "The whole thing stinks," said State Auditor Jim Zeigler. "It is outrageous. We have the potential for Gov. Blagojevich situation."

This interpretation was disputed by Mike Jones Jr., House Judiciary Committee Chairman, who said he believes the appointment was done in good faith. Jones noted that the hearings were stopped before the election and before the senate seat was available. "I made it clear in November when we were asked to pause that did not mean this would not finish, that there would come a time when we would conclude this investigation and we would have a hearing. I still say that." Jones and House Speaker Mac McCutcheon said February 9 they would wait for word from the attorney general's office before resuming the committee's work. McCutcheon said he wanted the process to play out.

Strange was quoted on February 9, 2017, as saying, "We have never said and I want to make this clear. We have never said in our office that we are investigating the governor. I think it's unfair to him and unfair to the process that it's been reported out there. We have six years of a record of the highest caliber of conduct of people in our Attorney General's office. That's why we don't comment on these things and why I don't plan to comment on that anymore." Governor Bentley later resigned after being indicted on criminal charges.

=== Tenure ===
Strange was sworn in on February 9 by Senate President pro tempore Orrin Hatch, Strange was one of 22 senators to sign a letter to President Donald Trump urging the President to have the United States withdraw from the Paris Agreement.

=== Committee assignments ===
- United States Senate Committee on Agriculture, Nutrition and Forestry
  - Subcommittee on Rural Development and Energy
  - Subcommittee on Conservation, Forestry and Natural Resources
  - Subcommittee on Nutrition, Agricultural Research and Specialty Crops (Chair)
- United States Senate Committee on Armed Services
  - Subcommittee on Readiness and Management Support
  - Subcommittee on Seapower
- United States Senate Committee on the Budget
- United States Senate Committee on Energy and Natural Resources
  - Subcommittee on Energy
  - Subcommittee on Public Lands, Forests and Mining
  - Subcommittee on Water and Power

=== Special election ===
Strange finished second to former Alabama Supreme Court judge Roy Moore. In the runoff on September 26, 2017, Moore again defeated Strange, 54.89% to 45.11%. Moore went on to lose the December 12 general election to Democratic nominee Doug Jones.

== Electoral history ==
Alabama Lieutenant Governor Republican primary election, 2006
Party	Candidate	Votes	%
Republican	Luther Strange	208,558	48.13
Republican	George Wallace Jr.	144,619	33.37
Republican	Mo Brooks	67,773	15.64
Republican	Hilbun "HA" Adams	12,413	2.86

Alabama Lieutenant Governor Republican primary runoff election, 2006
Party	Candidate	Votes	%
Republican	Luther Strange	108,904	54.81
Republican	George Wallace Jr.	89,788	45.19

Alabama Lieutenant Governor election, 2006
Party	Candidate	Votes	%
Democratic	Jim Folsom Jr.	629,268	50.61
Republican	Luther Strange	610,982	49.14
Write-ins		3,029	0.24
Democratic hold			

Alabama Attorney General Republican primary election, 2010
Party	Candidate	Votes	%
Republican	Luther Strange	284,853	60.13
Republican	Troy King (incumbent)	188,874	39.87

Alabama Attorney General election, 2010
Party	Candidate	Votes	%
Republican	Luther Strange	868,520	58.84
Democratic	James Anderson	606,270	41.07
Write-ins		1,285	0.09
Republican hold			

Alabama Attorney General election, 2014
Party	Candidate	Votes	%
Republican	Luther Strange (incumbent)	681,973	58.39
Democratic	Joe Hubbard	483,771	41.42
Write-ins		2,157	0.18
Republican hold			

U.S. Senate special election in Alabama, 2017 – Republican primary, first round
Party	Candidate	Votes	%
Republican	Roy Moore	228,524	38.87%
Republican	Luther Strange (incumbent)	188,971	32.83%
Republican	Mo Brooks	83,287	19.68%
Republican	Trip Pittman	29,124	6.88%
Republican	Randy Brinson	2,621	0.62%
Republican	Bryan Peeples	1,579	0.37%
Republican	Mary Maxwell	1,543	0.36%
Republican	James Beretta	1,078	0.25%
Republican	Dom Gentile	303	0.07%
Republican	Joseph Breault	252	0.06%
Total votes		423,282	100.00%

U.S. Senate special election in Alabama, 2017 – Republican primary runoff
Party	Candidate	Votes	%
Republican	Roy Moore	262,204	54.6%
Republican	Luther Strange (incumbent)	218,066	45.4%
Total votes		480,270	100.0%

== Political positions ==
=== Donald Trump ===
Strange was supportive of President Donald Trump, saying that he wants "his agenda passed" and that he "couldn't be more honored" to be given Trump's endorsement. During Strange's tenure in the U.S. Senate, Strange voted in line with Donald Trump's stated position 91.1% of the time.

=== Gun policy ===
Strange has an A+ grade from the National Rifle Association Political Victory Fund for his opposition towards banning firearms and magazines and his consistent rejection of gun control efforts by the Democratic Party. Chris W. Cox describes Strange as being a "champion for gun owners in Alabama and across the country."

== Personal life ==
Strange is married to Melissa Strange and resides in Homewood, Alabama.

At 6 feet 9 inches (2.06 m) tall, Strange is the tallest U.S. Senator in history to have served and was among the tallest members of Congress.

Strange is a member of the Episcopal Church.

Strange holds a 16% share of Sunbelt EB-5 Regional Center, LLC, which helps broker deals between investors and U.S. projects that need capital. The company uses the EB-5 visa program which allows foreigners to earn permanent residency for themselves and their children, if they invest $500,000 or $1 million in an American business venture that creates at least 10 jobs. Strange earned over $150,000 for his role in helping a Birmingham Baptist hospital expansion.

== Awards and honors ==
In 2011, Strange was honored by the Boy Scouts of America as a Distinguished Eagle Scout.

Party political offices
Preceded by Bill Armistead	Republican nominee for Lieutenant Governor of Alabama; 2006	Succeeded by Kay Ivey
Preceded by Troy King	Republican nominee for Attorney General of Alabama; 2010, 2014	Succeeded by Steve Marshall
Legal offices
Preceded by Troy King	Attorney General of Alabama; 2011–2017	Succeeded by Steve Marshall
U.S. Senate
Preceded by Jeff Sessions	U.S. Senator (Class 2) from Alabama; 2017–2018; Served alongside: Richard Shelby	Succeeded by Doug Jones
U.S. order of precedence (ceremonial)
Preceded by Donald Stewart as Former U.S. Senator	Order of precedence of the United States	Succeeded by Doug Jones as Former U.S. Senator
