= Columbus Jones =

American politician (died 1869)

Columbus Jones (died 1869) was an American politician who was a delegate at Alabama's 1867 Constitutional Convention and served as state legislator representing Madison County, Alabama. He served in the Alabama House of Representatives and died while still in office.

Jones was born enslaved and was documented as illiterate.

He, Andrew J. Applegate, and Lafayette Robinson appeared on an 1867 "Republican Union" ticket as delegate candidates for the Alabama Constitutional Convention. They were elected. Applegate went on to serve as Lieutenant Governor of Alabama from 1868 to 1870.
