= 189th Ohio Infantry Regiment =

- Active: March 5, 1865, to September 28, 1865
- Country: United States
- Allegiance: Union
- Branch: Infantry

The 189th Ohio Infantry Regiment, sometimes 189th Ohio Volunteer Infantry (or 189th OVI) was an infantry regiment in the Union Army during the American Civil War.

== Service ==
The 189th Ohio Infantry was organized at Camp Chase in Columbus, Ohio, and mustered in for one year service on March 4, 1865, under the command of Colonel Henry Denison Kingsbury.

The regiment left Ohio for Huntsville, Alabama, March 7. It was attached to District of North Alabama, Department of the Tennessee, to September 1865. Arrived at Huntsville, March 17, 1865. Assigned to duty along Memphis & Charleston Railroad guarding bridges and building stockades until June. The regiment concentrated June 20 and was assigned to post duty at Huntsville until September 25.

The 189th Ohio Infantry mustered out of service September 28, 1865, at Nashville, Tennessee.

== Casualties ==
The regiment lost a total of 49 enlisted men during service; 1 man killed, 48 due to disease.

== Commanders ==
- Colonel Henry Denison Kingsbury

== Notable members ==
- Captain Andrew J. Applegate, Company H - first lieutenant governor of Alabama, 1868–1870

== See also ==
- List of Ohio Civil War units
- Ohio in the Civil War
