= 1902 Alabama lieutenant gubernatorial election =

- November 4, 1902
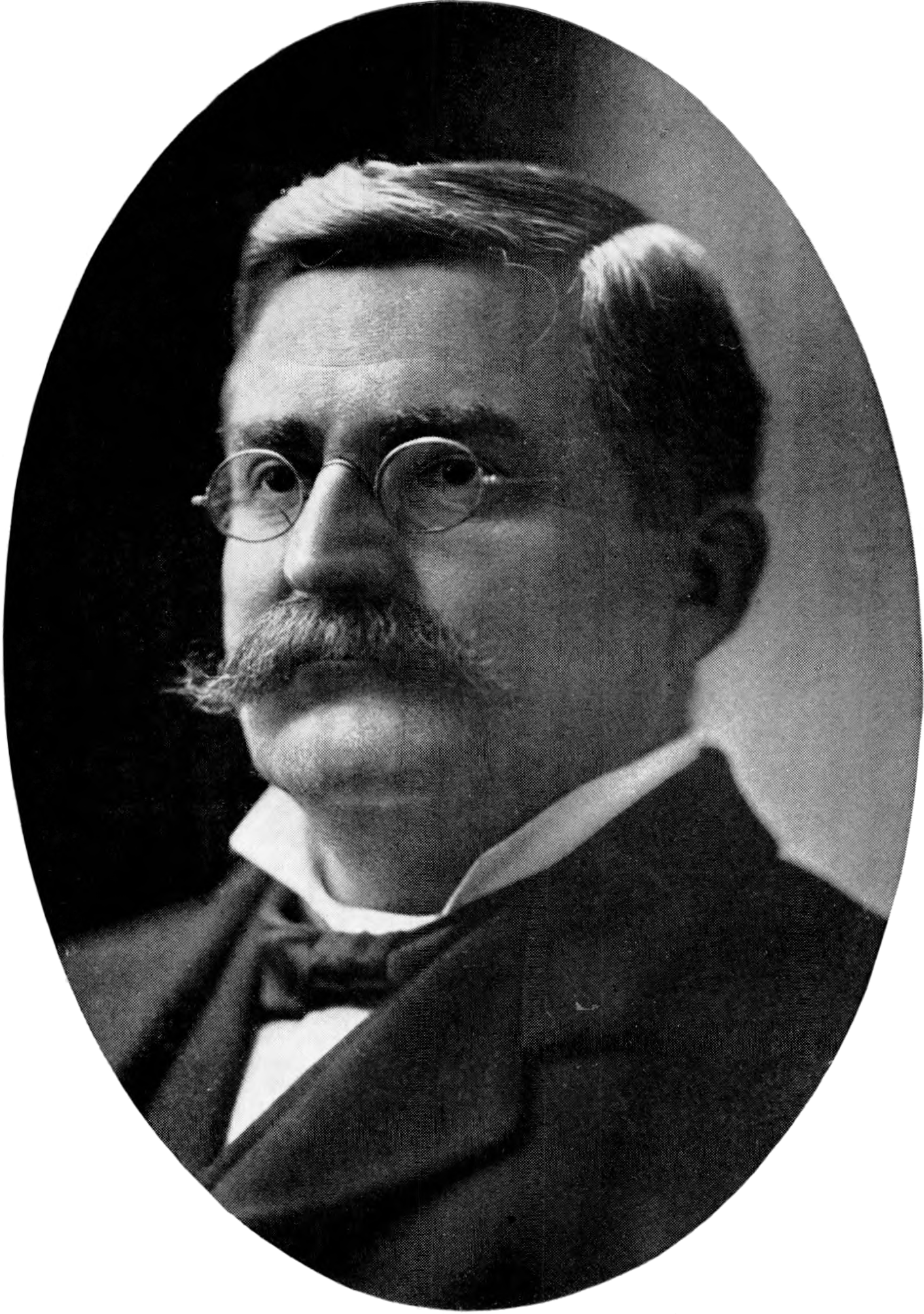

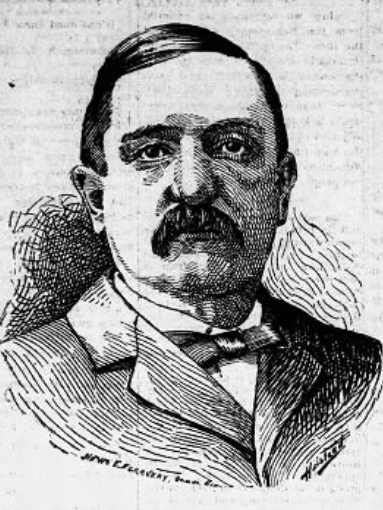
Candidate	Russell M. Cunningham	Charles P. Lane
Party	Democratic	Republican
Popular vote	65,804	22,479
Percentage	74.5%	25.5%
Elected lieutenant governor
Russell McWhortor Cunningham
Democratic

The 1902 Alabama lieutenant gubernatorial election was held on November 4, 1902, to elect the lieutenant governor of Alabama to a four-year term. It was the first election to the position since it was previously abolished in 1876. Democratic nominee Russell McWhortor Cunningham was elected.

== Nominees ==
- Russell McWhorter Cunningham, surgeon (Democratic)
- Charles P. Lane, newspaper writer (Republican)

== Results ==
1902 Alabama lieutenant gubernatorial election
Party	Candidate	Votes	%
Democratic	Russell McWhortor Cunningham	65,804	74.53
Republican	Charles P. Lane	22,479	25.46
Prohibition (write-in)	C. J. Hammett	11	0.01
Total votes		88,294	100.00
