= Henry B. Gray =

American politician (1867–1919)

Henry Bramlette Gray
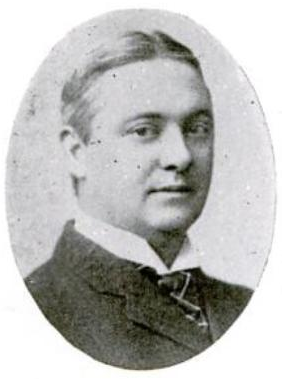

6th Lieutenant Governor of Alabama
- In office January 14, 1907 – January 17, 1911
- Governor: B. B. Comer
- Preceded by: Russell M. Cunningham
- Succeeded by: Walter D. Seed, Sr.

Personal details
- Born: February 8, 1867
- Died: April 30, 1919 (aged 52)
- Party: Democratic

Henry Bramlette Gray (February 8, 1867 – April 30, 1919) of Birmingham, Alabama was born in Calhoun County, Georgia. Gray was an American politician who served as the sixth lieutenant governor of Alabama from 1907 to 1911.

== Family ==
Henry Gray was the son of Zachary Thompson and Hannah Elizabeth Gray and was the grandson of John and Chloe Gray, and of Evan Alexander and Jane (Smith) Kiker. Zachary Gray, his father, was from Stone Mountain, Georgia. His paternal grandparents lived in Summerville, Georgia and his maternal grandparents lived at Calhoun, Georgia. On April 15, 1891, Henry Gray married his wife Bessie in Birmingham, Alabama. Bessie was the daughter of Colonel Alburto and Louise Martin and the granddaughter of John Martin and Judge William S. and Florence Mudd. All of which were from Jefferson County.

== Education ==
Gray received a good public school education in Atlanta, Georgia.

== Career ==
In 1885 Gray took on a career in the newspaper industry with a company named Atlanta Constitution. In 1887, Gray resigned from his newspaper job and moved to the city of Bermingham where he was on the staff of the Age-Herald until 1892. In 1896, Gray was elected as a member of the board of aldermen of Birmingham and in 1897 was elected as a member of the board of education. In 1900 the residents elected him as the Treasurer of Jefferson County. Gray held his treasury position for four years. From 1901 to 1906, he served as the Colonel inspector general of rifle practice Gray was also a member of the Jefferson County Democratic Executive Committee from 1896 to 1900 and in 1898 was the chairman of the campaign committee.

== Organizations ==
Henry Gray was a member of numerous organizations which include:

- St. Mary's on the Highlands Church
- Masons
- Knights Templar
- Shriners
- Knights of Pythias
- Independent Order of Odd Fellows
- Benevolent Protective Order of Elks

== Death ==
Henry Gray died on April 30, 1919.

Political offices
Preceded by Russell M. Cunningham	Lieutenant Governor of Alabama; 1907–1911	Succeeded by Walter D. Seed, Sr.
