= Lafayette Robinson =

American politician and banker

- Born: Unknown; Alabama, U.S.
- Died: Unknown
- Occupations: Bank cashier, politician
- Employer: Freedman's Savings Bank (Huntsville branch)
- Known for: Delegate to Alabama's 1867 Constitutional Convention
- Office: Delegate, Alabama Constitutional Convention
- Political party: Republican
- Parent: John Robinson (father)

Lafayette Robinson was a bank cashier who served as a delegate to Alabama's 1867 Constitutional Convention representing Madison County, Alabama. He also served on the Huntsville School Board. He worked at the Freedman's Savings Bank in Huntsville.

Lafayette's father, John Robinson, was enslaved prior to 1828 when he was manumitted by the state legislature. In 1830 the legislature allowed him to free his wife and their two children, one of whom was Lafayette Robinson.

Lafayette Robinson left Alabama during the American Civil War to avoid conscription in the Confederate Army. He, Andrew J. Applegate, and Columbus Jones appeared on an 1867 "Republican Union" ticket as delegate candidates for the Alabama Constitutional Convention. They were elected.

A panic caused Freedman's Savings Bank to fail costing African American depositors.
