= 2002 Alabama lieutenant gubernatorial election =

- November 5, 2002
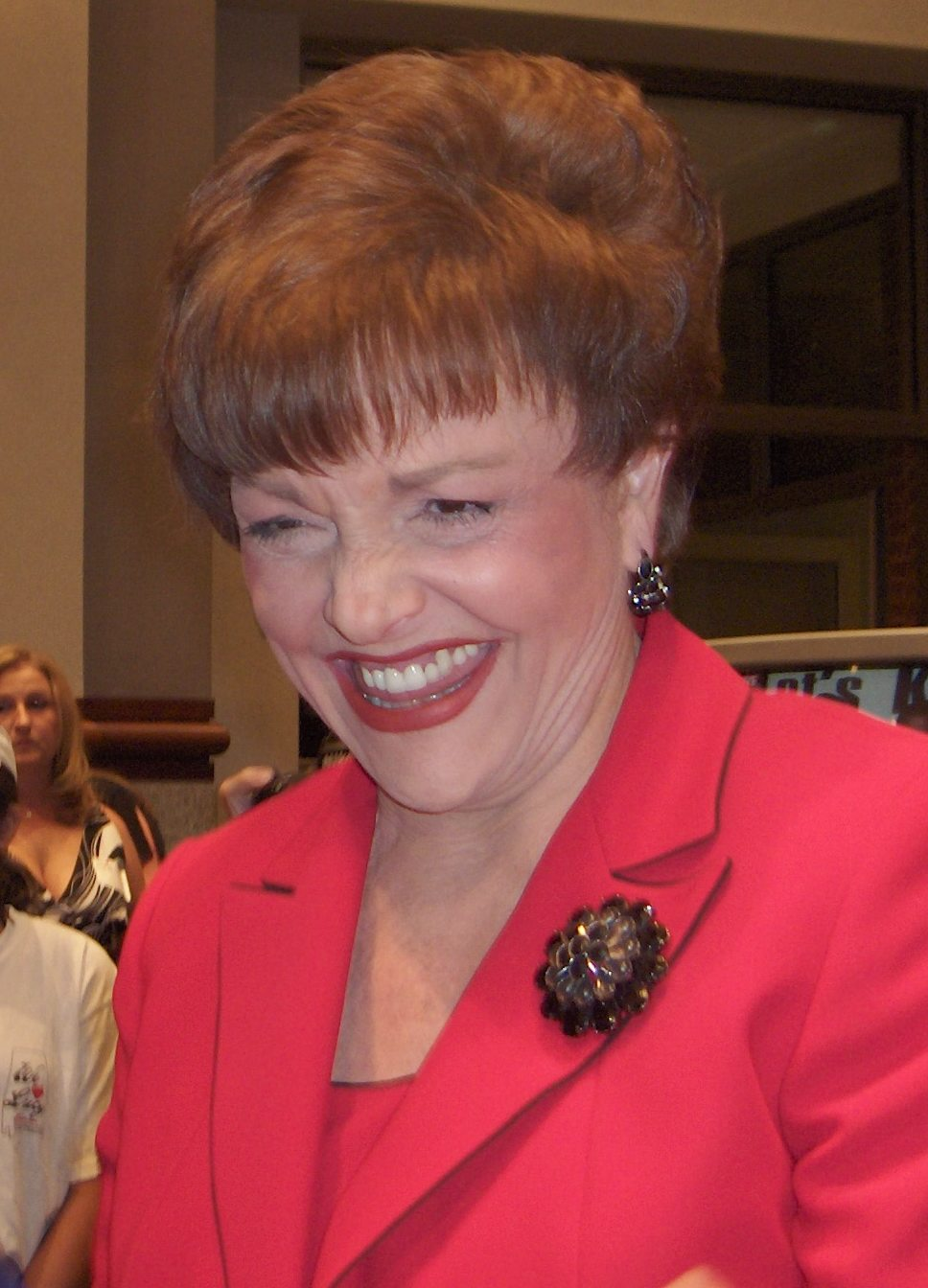

Nominee	Lucy Baxley	Bill Armistead
Party	Democratic	Republican
Popular vote	694,442	630,839
Percentage	51.48%	46.76%
- County results Baxley: 40–50% 50–60% 60–70% 70–80% 80–90% Armistead: 40–50% 50–60% 60–70% 70–80%
Lieutenant Governor before election
Steve Windom
Republican
Elected Lieutenant Governor
Lucy Baxley
Democratic

The 2002 Alabama lieutenant gubernatorial election was held on November 5, 2002, to elect the lieutenant governor of Alabama. Republican incumbent Steve Windom did not seek a second term, instead unsuccessfully running in the Republican primary for governor. Democratic Alabama state treasurer Lucy Baxley won the election, defeating Republican Alabama state senator Bill Armistead by 4.72 percentage points.

With her victory, Baxley became the first woman to be elected lieutenant governor of Alabama.

== Republican primary ==
=== Candidates ===
- Bill Armistead, Alabama state senator (1994–2002)
- Cheryl Bahakel, former Birmingham police officer

=== Results ===
Republican primary results
Party	Candidate	Votes	%
Republican	Bill Armistead	258,335	80.36%
Republican	Cheryl Bahakel	63,146	19.64%

== Democratic primary ==
Lucy Baxley was unopposed for the nomination and thus did not face a primary election.

== General election ==
=== Candidates ===
- Lucy Baxley, Alabama state treasurer (1995–2003) (Democratic)
- Bill Armistead, Alabama state senator (1994–2002) (Republican)
- Lyn Curtis Adams, truck driver (Libertarian)

=== Results ===
2002 Alabama lieutenant gubernatorial election results
Party	Candidate	Votes	%	±%
Democratic	Lucy Baxley	694,442	51.48%	+1.77%
Republican	Bill Armistead	630,839	46.76%	−3.53%
Libertarian	Lyn Curtis Adams	21,884	1.62%	N/A
Write-ins		1,873	0.14%	N/A
Total votes		1,349,038	100.00%	
Democratic gain from Republican				
