= 1950 Alabama gubernatorial election =

- November 7, 1950
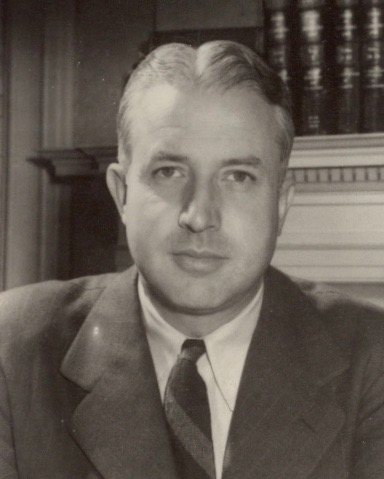

Nominee	Gordon Persons	John S. Crowder
Party	Democratic	Republican
Popular vote	154,414	15,127
Percentage	91.08%	8.92%
- County results Persons: 50–60% 60–70% 70–80% 80–90% >90%
Governor before election
Jim Folsom
Democratic
Elected Governor
Gordon Persons
Democratic

The 1950 Alabama gubernatorial election took place on November 7, 1950, to elect the governor of Alabama. Incumbent Democrat Jim Folsom was term-limited, and could not seek a second consecutive term.

== Democratic primary ==
At the time this election took place, Alabama, as with most other southern states, was solidly Democratic, and the Republican Party had such diminished influence that the Democratic primary was the de facto contest for state offices.

=== Candidates ===
- William M. Beck
- Robert Bell
- Elbert Boozer, former Calhoun County Probate Judge and candidate for governor in 1946
- Bull Connor, Birmingham Commissioner of Public Safety and candidate for governor in 1938
- Jas. M. Dement
- Hugh Dubose
- W. R. Farnell
- Wiley Gordon
- Phil Hamm, Commissioner of the Department of Revenue
- J. Bruce Henderson, State Senator
- Joe Money
- Reuben Newton
- Gordon Persons, President of the Public Service Commission and candidate for governor in 1946
- Chauncey Sparks, former governor
- Albert Stapp

=== Results ===
1950 Alabama Democratic gubernatorial primary
Party	Candidate	Votes	%
Democratic	Gordon Persons	137,055	34.08
Democratic	Phil Hamm	56,395	14.02
Democratic	Elbert Boozer	61,530	11.94
Democratic	J. Bruce Henderson	38,867	9.66
Democratic	Chauncey Sparks	27,404	6.81
Democratic	Bull Connor	20,629	5.13
Democratic	Robert Bell	20,171	5.02
Democratic	Reuben Newton	15,502	3.85
Democratic	Joe Money	10,555	2.62
Democratic	William M. Beck	10,218	2.54
Democratic	Albert Stapp	6,200	1.54
Democratic	Wiley Gordon	6,067	1.51
Democratic	Hugh Dubose	2,594	0.65
Democratic	Jas. M. Dement	2,030	0.51
Democratic	W. R. Farnell	478	0.12
Total votes		402,186	100.00

Hamm withdrew from the primary runoff, meaning that Persons became the Democratic nominee.

== Results ==
1950 Alabama gubernatorial election
Party	Candidate	Votes	%
Democratic	Gordon Persons	154,414	91.08
Republican	John S. Crowder	15,127	8.92
Total votes		169,541	100.00
Democratic hold			
