= Mount Hope, Lawrence County, Alabama =

Unincorporated community in Alabama, United States

Mount Hope, Alabama
- Unincorporated community
- Location within Alabama Location within the United States
- Coordinates: 34°27′30″N 87°28′54″W
- Country: United States
- State: Alabama
- County: Lawrence
- Elevation: 640 ft (200 m)
- Time zone: UTC-6 (Central (CST))
  - Summer (DST): UTC-5 (CDT)
- ZIP code: 35651
- Area codes: 256 & 938
- GNIS feature ID: 160152

Mount Hope is an unincorporated community in Lawrence County, Alabama, United States. Its ZIP code is 35651.

== Demographics ==
Historical population
| Census | Pop. | Note | %± |
|---|---|---|---|
| 1880 | 94 | | — |
U.S. Decennial Census

Mount Hope appeared on the 1880 U.S. Census as an unincorporated community of 94 residents. This was the only time it appeared on census rolls.

== 1985 School Fire ==
In 1985, Mount Hope High School burned down, forcing students to watch the school burn down helplessly; most of the students were awakened from their sleep as their school burned in the dark of midnight. Classes were temporarily held in the current elementary building, which was deteriorating due to the nearby Hatton School System and Tharptown School Systems; the high school was never reconstructed.

As of 2025, people who go to school in the elementary building eventually graduate sixth grade, and have a choice of the following surrounding schools to attend: East Lawrence, Lawrence County, or Hatton High School. Tharptown High School is also an option, though atypical.

The town was again demolished by the Hackleburg-Phil Campbell tornado of 2011. The tornado was at EF5 intensity as it struck Mount Hope.

== Notable person ==
Mount Hope was the birthplace of Russell McWhortor Cunningham, acting governor of Alabama from 1904–1905.
