= 32nd Alabama Infantry Regiment =

Infantry regiment of the Confederate States Army

- Flag of Alabama in 1861 (obverse and reverse)
- Active: April 1862 to November 1863
- Country: Confederate States of America
- Allegiance: CSA
- Branch: Infantry
- Engagements: Battle of Stone's River

The 32nd Alabama Infantry Regiment was an infantry regiment that served in the Confederate Army during the American Civil War.

== Service ==
On Dec. 27, 1861, Alexander McKinstry of Mobile, Alabama wrote the Confederate States War Department requesting authority to raise a regiment. His offer to Secretary of War James Seddon included a proposal to arm each enlisted man in his regiment with a Bowie knife and a pike. At the time McKinstry already held a commission as Colonel, 48th Alabama Militia Regiment, based in Mobile County, Alabama. As an officer of militia, on Feb. 18, 1862, McKinstry purchased 854 uniform jackets and pants, 677 pair of shoes, plus shirts, great coats and flannel drawers. The Confederate Government later reimbursed the state for this clothing, suggesting that officers and men of McKinstry's 32nd Alabama Infantry Regiment receive it. The regiment entered Confederate service at Camp Goodwin, near Mobile, Alabama, Apr. 18, 1862.

Companies and Their Captains

- "A" of Washington County, Alabama, "Wilson Guards", Capt. Robert L. Bowling,
- "B" of Mobile County, Alabama, Capt. John Drew,
- "C" of Mobile County, Alabama and Baldwin County, Alabama, "John Scott Infantry", Capt. Thomas S. Eaton,
- "D" of Wilcox County, Alabama and Clarke County, Alabama, "Creagh Guards", Capt. John W. Creagh,
- "E" of Clarke County, Alabama, "Bigbee Guards", Capt. Alexander Kilpatrick,
- "F" of Choctaw County, Alabama, Mobile County, Alabama and Washington County, Alabama, "Choctaw Guards", Capt. Hampton S. Smith, Jr.,
- "G" of Clarke County, Alabama and Washington County, Alabama, "Dickinson Guards", Capt. John C. Kimball,
- "H" of Clarke County, Alabama, Capt. John W. Bell,
- "I" of Mobile County, Alabama, Tuscaloosa County, Alabama and Fayette County, Alabama, Capt. Waller Thompson.,
- "K" of Mobile County, Alabama, "John Scott Guards", Capt. Isaac McCleveland.

On Nov. 23, 1863, this regiment and the 58th Regiment Alabama Infantry were consolidated to form the 32nd and 58th (Consolidated) Alabama Infantry Regiment.

== Total strength and casualties ==
Abstract of the Field Return, Army of Mobile, Mar. 31, 1862.

16 officers, 579 enlisted men present for duty; 616 aggregate present; 638 aggregate present and absent.

== Commanders ==
- Colonel Alexander McKinstry
- Lieutenant Colonel Henry Maury

== See also ==
- List of Confederate units from Alabama
