= Alexander McKinstry =

American politician

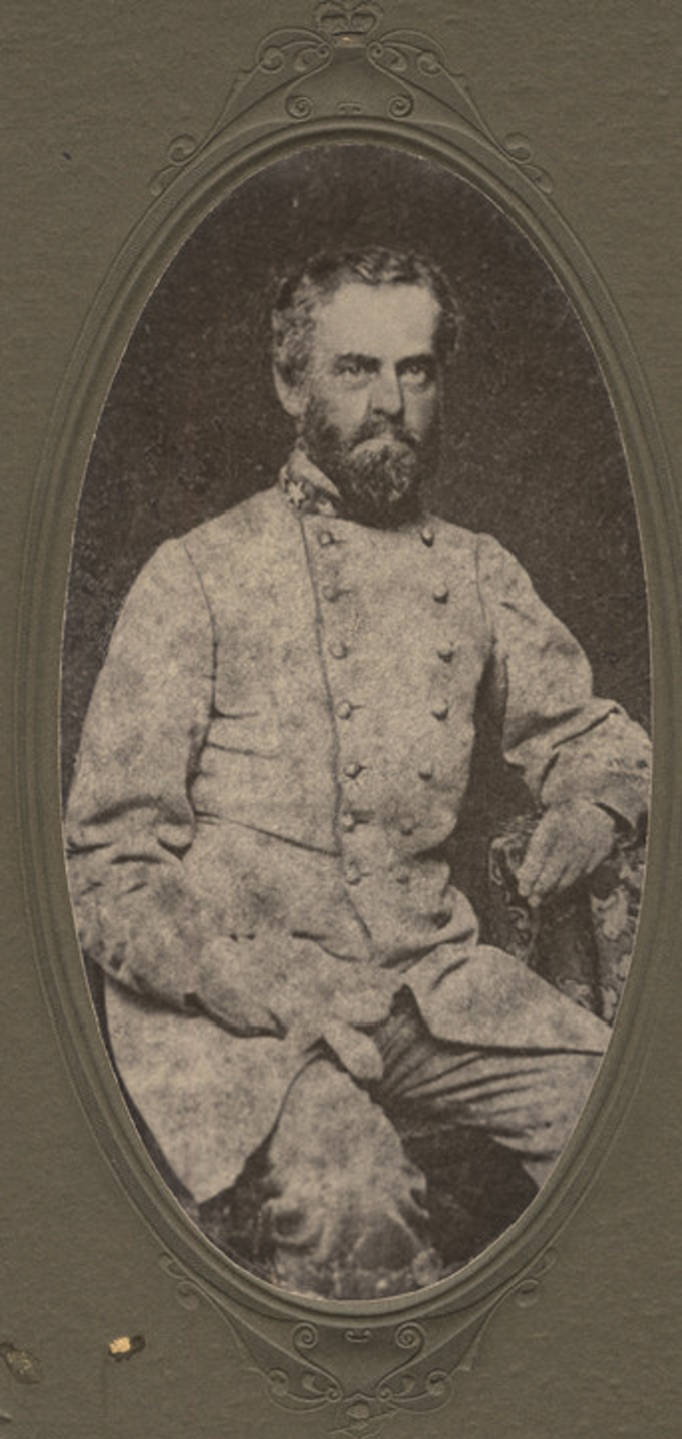

3rd Lieutenant Governor of Alabama
- In office November 17, 1872 – November 24, 1874
- Governor: David P. Lewis
- Preceded by: Edward H. Moren
- Succeeded by: Robert F. Ligon

Personal details
- Born: March 7, 1822 Augusta, Georgia, US
- Died: October 9, 1879 (aged 57)
- Party: Republican
- Spouse: Virginia Thompson Dade

Military service
- Allegiance: Confederate States of America
- Branch/service: Confederate States Army
- Rank: Colonel
- Unit: 32nd Regiment Alabama Infantry
- Battles/wars: American Civil War

Alexander McKinstry (March 7, 1822 – October 9, 1879) was the third lieutenant governor of Alabama. A Republican, McKinstry served under Governor David P. Lewis of the same political party from 1872 to 1874. He was the last Republican to serve as Lieutenant Governor until Steve Windom was sworn-in 125 years later.

== Biography ==
A native of Augusta, Georgia, McKinstry moved to Mobile, Alabama, to live with relatives at the age of fourteen. Working odd jobs, McKinstry began reading law while working in the office of John A. Campbell, who would later serve as an Associate Justice of the United States Supreme Court from 1853–1861. Soon after, McKinstry was admitted to the bar and began practicing law in Mobile County. Two years later, in 1847, McKinstry was elected colonel of the 48th Alabama Infantry Regiment, 9th Brigade, 4th Division of the State militia. After serving for three years, McKinstry resigned, returned to Mobile, and served as a judge for the city until 1860.

Over the next few years, McKinstry would serve several positions in the military, including serving as colonel of the 32nd Regiment Alabama Infantry during the American Civil War, returning to his law practice in 1864. The following year, in 1865, McKinstry expanded his legal career into politics. He was elected to the Alabama legislature and served as the chairman of the Alabama judiciary committee. He served in this capacity until his election as the third Lieutenant Governor of Alabama in 1872. In February 1873 McKinstry instigated a power grab when he manipulated parliamentary rules to deny Democrats control over the state senate. McKinstry ran again for lieutenant governor in 1874, but the Republican ticket went down in defeat.

Political offices
Preceded by Edward H. Moren	Lieutenant Governor of Alabama; 1872–1874	Succeeded by Robert F. Ligon
