= Andrew J. Applegate =

American politician

1st Lieutenant Governor of Alabama
- In office July 24, 1868 – August 21, 1870
- Governor: William Hugh Smith
- Succeeded by: Edward H. Moren

Personal details
- Born: October 14, 1833 Georgetown, Ohio, U.S.
- Died: August 21, 1870 (aged 36) Chattanooga, Tennessee, U.S.
- Party: Republican

Andrew J. Applegate (October 14, 1833 – August 21, 1870) was a lawyer, officer in the Union Army during the American Civil War, and served as the first lieutenant governor of Alabama during Reconstruction. A Republican, Applegate served with Governor William H. Smith of the same political party, from 1868 to 1870.

== Early life ==
A son of Benjamin and Rebecca Applegate, he grew up on a farm near Georgetown, Ohio. His father's family had emigrated from Holland, settling in Pennsylvania and then Kentucky, until finally moving to Ohio. Applegate was educated within the public schools at Georgetown, where he later studied and practiced law.

== Civil War ==
During the American Civil War, Applegate enlisted for one year on July 9, 1861, as a wagoner in the Fourth Independent Company, Ohio Cavalry, but soon became its quartermaster sergeant. In March 1865, he was commissioned captain of Company H, 189th Ohio Infantry. Too late to see combat action, his regiment was sent to Alabama to serve on occupation duty.

== Post-war career ==
After his discharge, Applegate returned home to Ohio and brought his family to Huntsville, Alabama where he opened a law practice. In 1867, he was elected on a "Republican Union" ticket with Lafayette Robinson and Columbus Jones to serve as delegates to the Constitutional Convention to frame a new State constitution. Republicans supported African American voting and civil rights and were referred to as Radical Republicans. In the election under that constitution, Applegate was Alabama's first and only elected lieutenant governor on August 13, 1868. He moved to Mobile, Alabama and served Alabama two years as lieutenant governor. He died of mysterious causes in Chattanooga two years later.

Political offices
Preceded by Title established	Lieutenant Governor of Alabama; 1868–1870	Succeeded by Edward H. Moren
