= Edward H. Moren =

American politician

Edward Hawthorne Moren
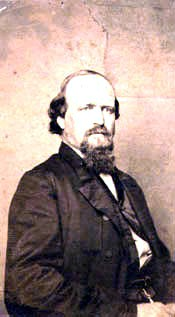

2nd Lieutenant Governor of Alabama
- In office November 26, 1870 – November 17, 1872
- Governor: Robert B. Lindsay
- Preceded by: Andrew J. Applegate
- Succeeded by: Alexander McKinstry

Personal details
- Born: December 25, 1825 Boston, Massachusetts
- Died: March 19, 1886 (aged 60)
- Party: Democratic

Edward Hawthorne Moren (December 25, 1825 – March 19, 1886) was the second lieutenant governor of Alabama. A Democrat, Moren served Governor Robert Burns Lindsay of the same political party, from 1870 to 1872.

Moren was raised in Dinwiddie County, Virginia by his parents Daniel and Mary Moren. His father, Daniel, was a State senator in Virginia for several terms. After graduating from medical school in New York, Edward Moren enlisted in the U.S. Army as an assistant surgeon, serving during the Mexican–American War. After leaving the U.S. army in 1848, Moren moved to Bibb County, Alabama where he continued to practice medicine. Over a decade later, in 1861, Moren was appointed to the upper house of the general assembly, in order to represent Perry and Bibb Counties. During his time in the upper house, Moren served on the Committee of Finance and Taxation as well as the Joint Committee of Retrenchment, as chairman.

After serving several terms in the upper house, Moren joined the Confederate States Army as a surgeon with the Twenty-ninth Alabama. In this position, Moren was charged with running a hospital in Greenville, Alabama. In 1870, Edward Moren was elected the second lieutenant governor of Alabama.

Political offices
| Preceded by Andrew J. Applegate | Lieutenant Governor of Alabama; 1870–1872 | Succeeded by Alexander McKinstry |
