= Walter D. Seed Sr. =

American politician (1864–1932)

Walter Dudley Seed Sr.
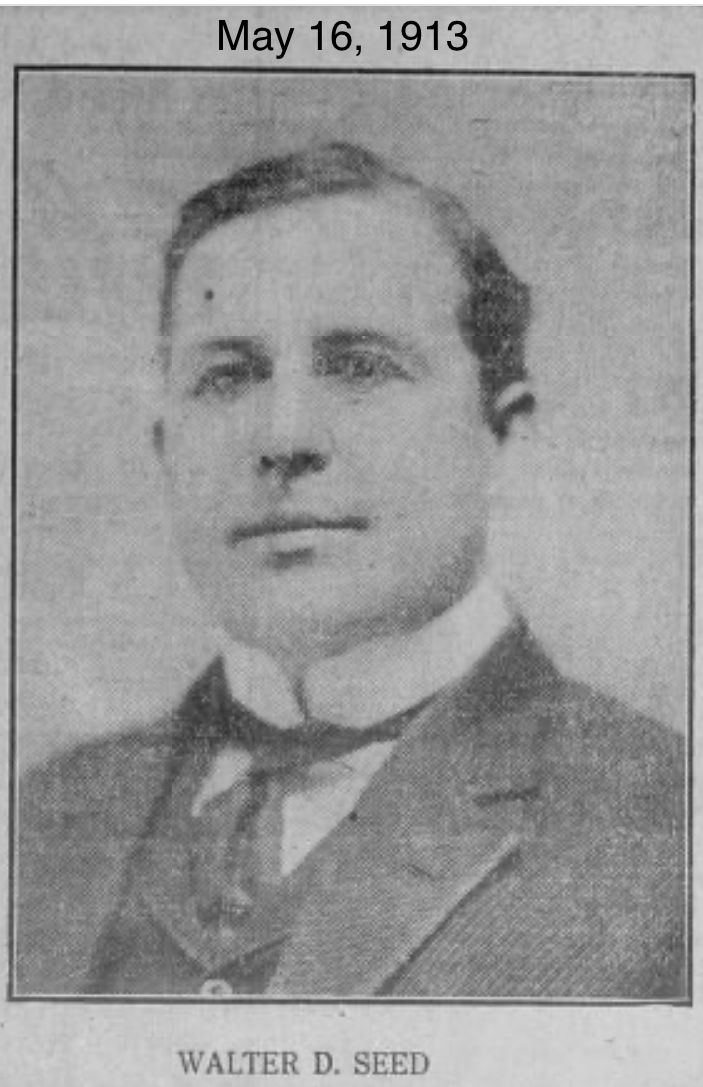
- Walter D. Seed

7th Lieutenant Governor of Alabama
- In office January 17, 1911 – January 18, 1915
- Governor: Emmet O'Neal
- Preceded by: Henry B. Gray
- Succeeded by: Thomas E. Kilby

19th Treasurer of Alabama
- In office 1907–1911
- Governor: B. B. Comer
- Preceded by: J. Craig Smith
- Succeeded by: John Purifoy

Personal details
- Born: June 26, 1864 Tuscaloosa, Alabama, Confederate States of America
- Died: August 12, 1932 (aged 68) Tuscaloosa, Alabama, U.S.
- Resting place: Evergreen Cemetery
- Party: Democratic
- Spouse: Ellen E. Foster (m. 1887)
- Children: 1
- Education: University of Alabama (AB)

Walter Dudley Seed Sr. (June 26, 1864 – August 12, 1932) was an American politician who served as the seventh lieutenant governor of Alabama from 1911 to 1915, and as Alabama State Treasurer from 1907 to 1911.

== Early life ==
Walter Dudley Seed was born on June 26, 1864, in Tuscaloosa, Alabama, to Mattie Cordet (née White) and Charles Clinton Seed. His father emigrated from Germany and worked as a clothing manufacturer, cotton merchant and alderman. Seed attended schools in Tuscaloosa. He graduated from the University of Alabama with a Bachelor of Arts in 1883. At the University of Alabama, he was president of the Philomathic Literary Society, editor of the University Monthly and lieutenant quartermaster of the Corps of Cadets.

== Career ==
From 1896 to 1900, Seed was treasurer of Tuscaloosa County. In 1906, he was nominated as state treasurer over Charles A. Allen. He served as Alabama State Treasurer from 1907 to 1911. He was a Democrat and ran as a prohibitionist for Lieutenant Governor of Alabama. He served as lieutenant governor from 1911 to 1915.

Seed retired from politics in 1914, after losing a bid for governor. He ran for state representative from Tuscaloosa County two years later. Prior to his death, he stated his intention of running for Alabama governor again in 1934.

== Personal life ==
On September 21, 1887, in Fosters, Seed married Ellen E. Foster, daughter of J. Luther Foster, of Tuscaloosa County. He had one son, Walter D. Jr. Seed was a Methodist.

Seed died on August 12, 1932, in Tuscaloosa. He was buried at Evergreen Cemetery.

Political offices
Preceded by Henry B. Gray	Lieutenant Governor of Alabama; 1911–1915	Succeeded by Thomas E. Kilby
Preceded by Walter D. Seed Sr.	Treasurer of Alabama; 1907–1911	Succeeded by John Purifoy
