= 1986 Brittany regional election =

Election in Brittany

A regional election took place in Brittany on March 16, 1986, along with all other regions.

Party	%	Seats
RPR-UDF	44.00%	41
Miscellaneous Right	5.90%	4
RPR-UDF	49.9%	45
PS-PCF-PRG-Les Verts	32.6%	30
PCF	7.00%	4
Presidential Majority	0.70%	0
Left	40.3%	34
FN	4.90%	2
The Greens	2.40%	0
LCR-LO	0.80%	0
Others	1.70%	0
Total	100.00%	83
