= 1990 Alabama lieutenant gubernatorial election =

- November 6, 1990
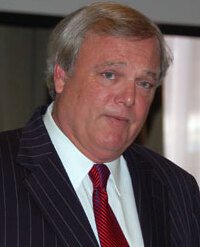

Nominee	Jim Folsom Jr.	Bob McKee
Party	Democratic	Republican
Popular vote	768,988	373,072
Percentage	67.33%	32.67%
- County results Folsom: 50–60% 60–70% 70–80% 80–90% >90% McKee: 50–60%
Lieutenant Governor before election
Jim Folsom Jr.
Democratic
Elected Lieutenant Governor
Jim Folsom Jr.
Democratic

The 1990 Alabama lieutenant gubernatorial election was held on November 6, 1990, in order to elect the lieutenant governor of Alabama. Incumbent Democratic lieutenant governor Jim Folsom Jr. defeated Republican nominee Bob McKee.

== Democratic primary ==
In the Democratic primary election, incumbent lieutenant governor Jim Folsom Jr. received a majority of the votes (80.87%), thus winning renomination and advancing to the general election.

=== Results ===
1990 Democratic lieutenant gubernatorial primary
Party	Candidate	Votes	%
Democratic	Jim Folsom Jr. (incumbent)	510,814	80.87%
Democratic	William McKinley Branch	120,861	19.13%
Total votes		631,675	100.00%

== General election ==
On election day, November 6, 1990, incumbent Democratic lieutenant governor Jim Folsom Jr. won re-election by a margin of 395,916 votes against his opponent Republican nominee Bob McKee, thereby retaining Democratic control over the office of lieutenant governor. Folsom was sworn in for his second term on January 15, 1991.

=== Results ===
Alabama lieutenant gubernatorial election, 1990
Party	Candidate	Votes	%
Democratic	Jim Folsom Jr. (incumbent)	768,988	67.33
Republican	Bob McKee	373,072	32.67
Total votes		1,142,060	100.00
Democratic hold			
