= 1974 Alabama lieutenant gubernatorial election =

- November 5, 1974
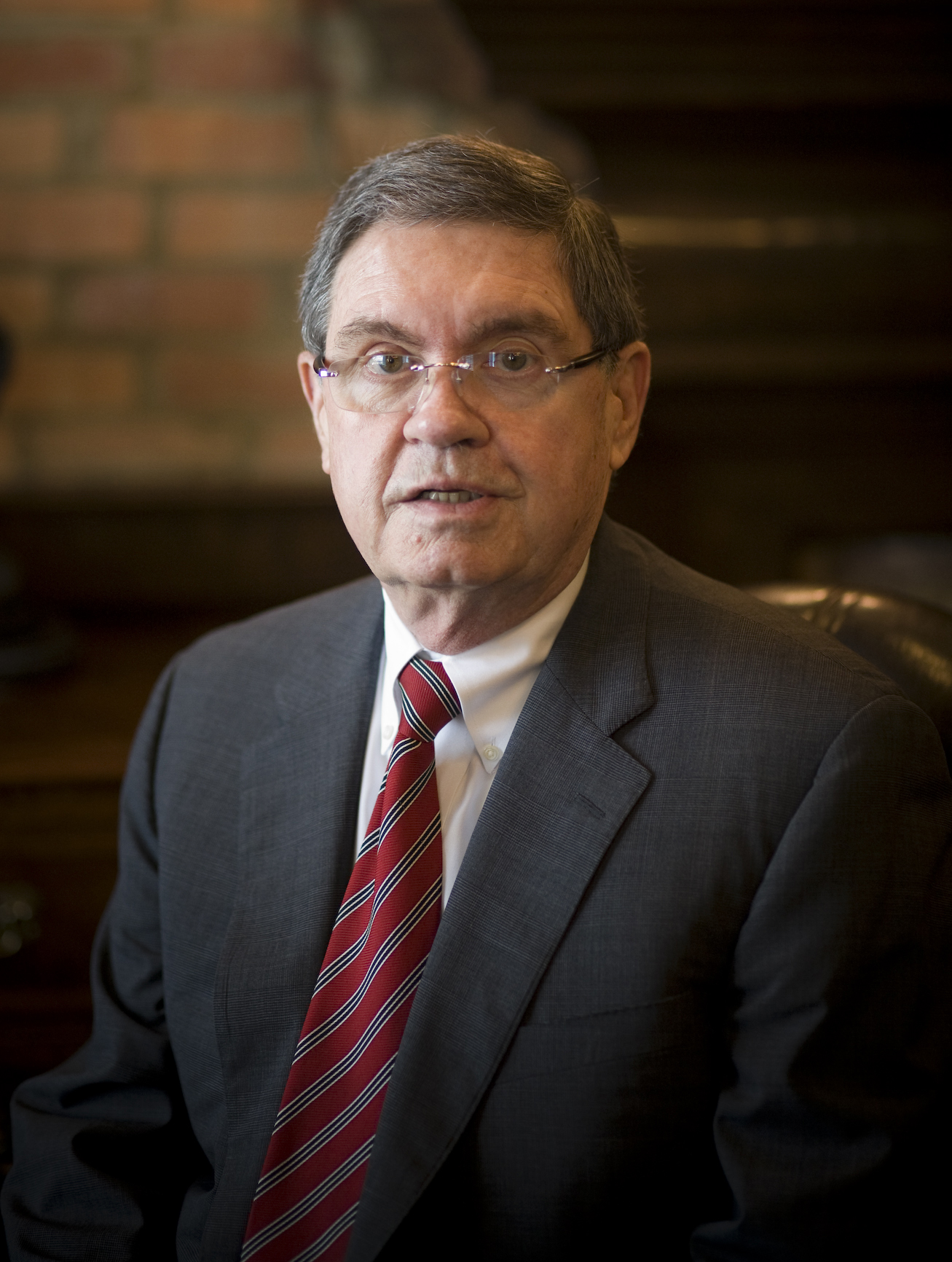

Nominee	Jere Beasley	Don Collins
Party	Democratic	Republican
Popular vote	433,495	153,814
Percentage	72.06%	25.57%
Lieutenant Governor before election
Jere Beasley
Democratic
Elected Lieutenant Governor
Jere Beasley
Democratic

The 1974 Alabama lieutenant gubernatorial election was held on November 5, 1974, in order to elect the lieutenant governor of Alabama. Incumbent Democratic Lieutenant Governor Jere Beasley defeated Republican nominee Don Collins, Prohibition nominee Edna L. Bowling and Independent candidate John Watts.

== Democratic primary ==
In the Democratic primary election, candidate Charles Woods received a plurality of the votes (38.68%), thus advancing to a runoff against runner-up and incumbent Lieutenant Governor Jere Beasley. Beasley defeated Woods in the runoff with 56.10%, and was thus renominated for the general election.

=== First Round ===
1974 Democratic lieutenant gubernatorial primary
Party	Candidate	Votes	%
Democratic	Charles Woods	310,351	38.68%
Democratic	Jere Beasley (incumbent)	308,182	38.41%
Democratic	Richard Dominick	150,455	18.75%
Democratic	Ron Creel	25,392	3.17%
Democratic	Coleman Brown	7,943	0.99%
Total votes		802,323	100.00%

=== Runoff ===
1974 Democratic lieutenant gubernatorial runoff
Party	Candidate	Votes	%
Democratic	Jere Beasley (incumbent)	393,077	56.10%
Democratic	Charles Woods	307,643	43.90%
Total votes		700,720	100.00%

== General election ==
On election day, November 5, 1974, incumbent Democratic Lieutenant Governor Jere Beasley won re-election by a margin of 279,681 votes against his foremost opponent Republican nominee Don Collins, thereby retaining Democratic control over the office of lieutenant governor. Beasley was sworn in for his second term on January 21, 1975.

=== Results ===
Alabama lieutenant gubernatorial election, 1974
Party	Candidate	Votes	%
Democratic	Jere Beasley (incumbent)	433,495	72.06
Republican	Don Collins	153,814	25.57
Prohibition	Edna L. Bowling	9,857	1.64
Independent	John Watts	4,387	0.73
Total votes		601,553	100.00
Democratic hold			
