= 1998 Alabama lieutenant gubernatorial election =

- November 3, 1998
Nominee	Steve Windom	Dewayne Freeman
Party	Republican	Democratic
Popular vote	652,465	644,818
Percentage	50.29%	49.71%
- Windom: 50–60% 60–70% 80–90% Freeman: 50–60% 60–70% 70–80% >90%
Lieutenant Governor before election
Don Siegelman
Democratic
Elected Lieutenant Governor
Steve Windom
Republican

The 1998 Alabama lieutenant gubernatorial election was held on November 3, 1998, in order to elect the lieutenant governor of Alabama. Republican nominee and incumbent member of the Alabama Senate Steve Windom defeated Democratic nominee and incumbent president pro tempore of the Alabama Senate Dewayne Freeman. Windom became the first Republican lieutenant governor of Alabama since Reconstruction.

== Republican primary ==
In the Republican primary election, candidate Steve Windom received a majority of the votes (52.83%), thus winning the nomination and advancing to the general election.

=== Results ===
1998 Republican lieutenant gubernatorial primary
Party	Candidate	Votes	%
Republican	Steve Windom	178,065	52.83%
Republican	John Amari	159,006	47.17%
Total votes		337,071	100.00%

== General election ==
On election day, November 3, 1998, Republican nominee Steve Windom won the election by a margin of 7,647 votes against his opponent Democratic nominee Dewayne Freeman, thereby gaining Republican control over the office of lieutenant governor for the first time since 1872. Windom was sworn in as the 27th lieutenant governor of Alabama on January 18, 1999.

=== Results ===
Alabama lieutenant gubernatorial election, 1998
Party	Candidate	Votes	%
Republican	Steve Windom	652,465	50.29
Democratic	Dewayne Freeman	644,818	49.71
Total votes		1,297,283	100.00
Republican gain from Democratic			
