= Troy King =

American lawyer

46th Attorney General of Alabama
- In office February 20, 2004 – January 17, 2011
- Governor: Bob Riley
- Preceded by: Bill Pryor
- Succeeded by: Luther Strange

Personal details
- Born: Troy Robin King; August 22, 1968 (age 58) Elba, Alabama, U.S.
- Party: Republican
- Spouse: Paige King
- Children: 3
- Education: Troy University (BA); University of Alabama (JD)

Troy Robin King (born August 22, 1968) is the former attorney general of the state of Alabama. He previously served as an assistant attorney general and a legal adviser to both Republican governors Bob Riley and Fob James. King was appointed by Governor Bob Riley in 2004, when William Pryor resigned to accept a federal judgeship.

He then defeated Mobile County District Attorney John Tyson Jr., in the 2006 election by a 54-46% margin. He sought a second term but was defeated in the Republican primary, securing 40 percent of the vote to the roughly 60 percent by Luther Strange.

== Personal life ==
King was born in Elba, Alabama, where his father was a real estate agent. King credits his interest in politics to being told at age 10 by his father that a canceled family vacation was the fault of President Jimmy Carter (D-GA). He is a Baptist. King received his undergraduate degree from Troy University and is a 1994 graduate of the University of Alabama Law School.

== Issues ==
=== Pharmaceutical pricing ===
In January 2005, King filed a suit against 79 of the nation's leading pharmaceutical companies for defrauding the State Medicaid agency. King accused the companies of misrepresenting and inflating wholesale drug costs charged to Alabama, costing hundreds of millions in overpayments by Alabama taxpayers.

In April 2008, the Alabama Supreme Court ruled in favor of the state, allowing more than one pharmaceutical company to be tried at the same time in the proceedings, allowing the state to try the remaining cases faster. While the state tried at least four cases and received favorable verdicts totaling several hundred million, and negotiated settlements of $89 million.

As of May 2009, King had won nearly $300 million in jury verdicts and settlements, on October 16, 2009, the Alabama Supreme Court reversed the verdicts entered against the pharmaceutical companies and rendered judgment in their favor. "The court ruled 8-1 that the state did not have to rely on the drug companies' information in deciding what prices to pay pharmacists for prescription drugs for Medicaid recipients. The justices said state officials could have done their own research and determined the correct price."

=== Tracking sex offenders ===
King brought attention to the need for new laws requiring the tracking of released sex offenders by wearing an electronic monitoring bracelet (the kind used by parolees and others under judicial monitoring) during the 2005 Legislative Session. He continued to wear the bracelet until the Legislature passed tougher laws requiring the monitoring of parolees and convicted sex offenders.

=== Gambling investigation and controversy ===
==== Background ====
King made opposition to gambling a theme of his tenure. In addition to prosecuting several local electronic gambling operations and introducing anti-gambling legislation in every session of the Legislature since becoming the attorney general, he also opposed gambling expansion for the Native American tribes in Alabama. In 2006, King asked the United States Department of the Interior to deny an application by the Poarch Band of Creek Indians to expand their gaming operations in Alabama. King later filed a lawsuit against the department to keep it from pressuring Alabama to permit video gaming on Alabama reservations.

==== Conflict with Governor Riley ====
In 2009, however, King found himself in conflict with Alabama Governor Bob Riley. Riley argued that there is no distinction between electronic bingo machines and slot machines, which are illegal in the state. King has insisted that although he objects to any form of gambling, Alabama has approved several constitutional amendments which have legalized the machines. King's office has issued an opinion in line with previous federal court rulings which establish that there can be an electronic version of common games, such as the card game, Solitaire, which can also be played on a computer.

On June 28, 2009, the Birmingham News reported that King did not reference findings from the National Indian Gaming Commission in his 2004 report on gambling, which stated that some of Alabama's electronic bingo machines appeared to be class three gambling devices. King said that the only factors to consider are if the constitutional amendments approved by the citizens have legalized these machines, and whether the National Indian Gaming Commission considers the machines Class Three or Class Two is a federal designation and not relevant under Alabama law. Riley said, "I think the reason it has expanded exponentially across the state is because the attorney general has given a legitimacy or creditability by saying he thinks it is legal, and he is wrong."

King said that to interpret the change of games from paper gambling to electronic gambling would be judicial activism. The Birmingham News agreed with King that the best body to decide this matter is the state's legislature, but that body had been in a deadlock over the issue for years. Both the governor and the attorney general filed briefs before the Alabama Supreme Court asking for a decision on the legality of the machines.

==== November 2009 Alabama Supreme Court ruling ====
In November 2009 the Alabama Supreme Court released a decision on the Whitehall Bingo Case, establishing a six-point test for electronic bingo, thereby ruling that electronic bingo could exist in Alabama, but that is must meet the six-point test. Both the attorney general and the governor had mixed reactions. King felt the decision helped his position, but noted questions still lingered when he spoke to the Birmingham News: ""We have a clearer test. We do not have a clear test." More cases are expected to be filed and everyone expects the battle for electronic bingo to continue. The next week, King issued a letter to the state's district attorneys, asking them to enforce the new test issued by the Supreme Court, saying he was confident that they would do so. More challenges and more lawsuits were expected and King reiterated his feeling that the only long term solution to gambling is for the Legislature to "give the people of Alabama the chance to vote yes or no."

==== May 2010 Alabama Supreme Court ruling ====
On May 21, 2010, the Alabama Supreme Court handed down a finalized ruling that answered lingering questions in the gambling debate between King and Governor Riley. The court's ruling had two components: first, that the governor does indeed maintain the constitutional authority to approve law enforcement actions without the approval of the attorney general, and second, that any law enforcement operation conceived and operated by the governor cannot be seized by the attorney general, and any previously seized operations must be immediately turned over to the governor's appointed special counsel. The relevant section of the Supreme Court ruling states that "we hold that the actions of the attorneys and other officers authorized by Governor Riley to act in this case are not "nullities," despite the lack of approval by the attorney general and the district attorney, and that the attorney general may not take over or countermand the litigation efforts of those officers in either the trial court or in this Court. The counsel authorized by the governor have the right to represent the state in this case and to see it through to completion."

=== Death penalty stance ===
King is a staunch proponent of the death penalty. When many states voluntarily suspended executions during U.S. Supreme Court litigation over lethal injection, King continued to seek setting execution dates in Alabama. King's support of the death penalty created a controversy when, in 2007, a district attorney in suburban Birmingham supported commuting the death sentence of an accomplice in a case in which the actual shooter had escaped the death penalty because he was a juvenile. King received support in the controversy from the victim's family, and from death penalty supporters, for his efforts to seek the death penalty for the accomplice. The incident led a wide, bipartisan coalition of local district attorneys, as well as newspaper editorials, to criticize King.

=== Voter fraud investigations ===
King launched a series of voter fraud investigations as a result of complaints following state and local elections. The probe included an indictment against the Hale County former circuit clerk, officials in Evergreen following a municipal election and Perry County officials following complaints registered with the Secretary of State after the mayoral runoff in Marion. He launched investigations into Bullock, Jackson and Lowndes counties but claimed obstruction by the federal government, prompting the Mobile Press-Register to publish an editorial calling for the Department of Justice to cooperate with King.

=== Anti-Obscenity Enforcement Act of 1998 ===
After his appointment as attorney general in 2004, King replaced his predecessor former Alabama Attorney General William H. Pryor, Jr. as defendant in Williams v. Morgan, which unsuccessfully sought to enjoin the state of Alabama from enforcing the Anti-Obscenity Enforcement Act of 1998, a law prohibiting the sale of any "device designed or marketed as useful primarily for the stimulation of human genital organs" (commonly known as "sex toys"). King defended the law. This stance was praised by certain religious groups but subjected him to considerable criticism from editorial writers and civil liberties advocates, one of which mailed King an inflatable pig sex toy.

=== Recusal while investigating Alabama's community college system ===
In late 2006, King was forced to recuse his entire office from the ongoing investigation of abuses in the Alabama community college system when it emerged that he had asked community college chancellor Roy Johnson to hire the mother of one of King's employees. It later emerged that King asked Johnson for community college system financial support for Victims of Crime and Leniency (VOCAL), an international advocacy group composed of Alabama families who have been addressing crime victims' needs —and a group which has supported King. King's office continued to provide investigative support, which resulted in a guilty plea by Johnson in the related federal investigation.

=== Accusations of improper receipt and gift reporting ===
In early 2007, an investigative article published by The Birmingham News revealed that King and a group from his church had accepted free tickets, food and skybox access to an Atlanta Braves baseball game from Alabama Power Company the previous season. Alabama Power had not reported the gifts to appropriate ethics agencies, as required, until contacted by the News. King attended the game with his family and church friends. The total food bill was more than $1,200 for everyone in King's group, plus others in attendance. The skybox normally rented for $2,400 a day.

King, as attorney general, was legally responsible for representing Alabama Power customers before the Alabama Public Service Commission. Thus, he was criticized by The Birmingham News for accepting the gifts. He reimbursed Alabama Power $486 for his family's food, but did not reimburse it for food eaten by the company's other guests, including his church group. King denied wrongdoing in the matter and argued that Alabama Power was responsible for reporting the matter and should have done so appropriately.

=== Anthony Castaldo perjury incident ===
Later in 2007, Anthony Castaldo, a former investigator with the attorney general's office was charged with perjury by District Attorney David Barber. During the trial, Castaldo submitted an affidavit that King had ordered him to investigate a Birmingham-area judge for political reasons. Castaldo claimed he was punished after a year-long investigation showed no evidence of wrongdoing by the judge in question. After other investigators took over the case, King secured an indictment against the judge, but the charges against the judge were later dismissed. (The other judge's surname was also "King".) Castaldo was acquitted of the perjury charge and later resigned his position within the attorney general's office.

=== Staff salaries ===
In 2008, an investigative story by The Birmingham News reviewed the salaries paid by King to members of his staff. One aide to King was being paid $57,504 a year–-almost the salary for starting lawyers—within three months of graduating from college. This staffer was initially paid $39,456 a year as an "intern" while still enrolled in college. The department's chief of staff said that the aide in question traveled extensively with the attorney general and "is almost indispensable in terms of the many functions he carries out in this office." King's salary of $164,000 is tied by law to that of the Supreme Court Justices who, along with King, are among the highest paid in the nation.

King was criticized in a newspaper editorial by The Montgomery Advertiser saying the salaries were "out of line for their experience and qualifications." King did not change the salaries.

=== Gasoline price gouging investigation ===
In September 2008, in the aftermath of hurricanes Gustav and Ike, King's office began processing more than 2,500 complaints regarding gasoline prices under Alabama's price gouging statutes. A month later, a King spokesman said the investigations remained "ongoing" as the prices begin to return to lower levels.

=== Defeated in race for second term ===
After having been mentioned as a possible gubernatorial candidate in 2010, King announced his re-election campaign for attorney general on March 9, 2009.

King was an early supporter of the 2008 presidential campaign of Arizona Senator John McCain and served as the Alabama chair of the McCain campaign.

King was defeated by Luther Strange in the GOP primary on June 1, 2010.

== Professional experience ==
Sometime after 2010, King became the founding President of Bear Mountain Development Co. LLC, based in Montgomery, Alabama. In May 2020, the company was accused of failing to deliver on a $800 million contract with the state of California to supply 400 million three-ply surgical masks and 200 million face shields.

- Legal Advisor, Governor Bob Riley, 2003–2004
- Assistant Attorney General, 1999–2003
- Deputy Executive Secretary, 1997–1999
- Acting Executive Secretary, 1997
- Deputy Legal Advisor, 1995–1997
- Legal Advisor, 1995.

== See also ==
- Anti-Obscenity Enforcement Act
- Bear Mountain Development Co. LLC COVID-19 Scandal

Party political offices
Preceded by William H. Pryor Jr.	Republican nominee for Attorney General of Alabama; 2006	Succeeded by Luther Strange
Legal offices
Preceded by Bill Pryor	Attorney General of Alabama; 2004–2011	Succeeded by Luther Strange
