= 1966 Alabama lieutenant gubernatorial election =

- November 8, 1966
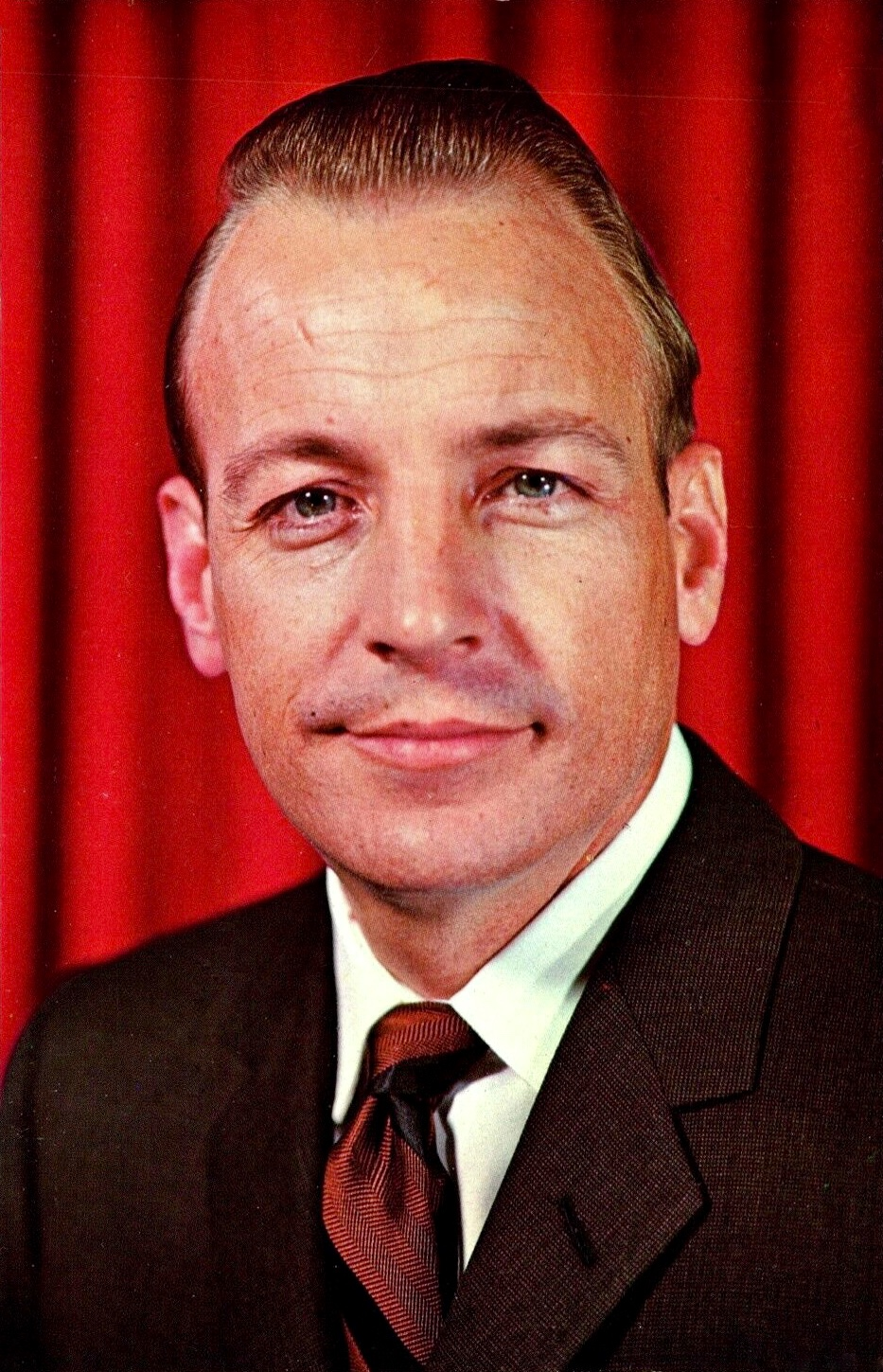
Nominee	Albert Brewer
Party	Democratic
Popular vote	364,473
Percentage	100.0%
Lieutenant Governor before election
James Allen
Democratic
Elected Lieutenant Governor
Albert Brewer
Democratic

The 1966 Alabama lieutenant gubernatorial election was held on November 8, 1966, in order to elect the lieutenant governor of Alabama. Democratic nominee Albert Brewer won the election as he faced no opposition in the general election.

== Democratic primary ==
In the Democratic primary election, candidate Albert Brewer received a majority of the votes (66.90%), thus becoming the Democratic nominee for lieutenant governor.

=== Results ===
1966 Democratic lieutenant gubernatorial primary
Party	Candidate	Votes	%
Democratic	Albert Brewer	473,617	66.90%
Democratic	Neil Metcalf	125,047	17.70%
Democratic	John Tyson Sr.	66,302	9.40%
Democratic	John A. Reynolds	43,332	6.10%
Total votes		708,298	100.00%

== General election ==
On election day, November 8, 1966, Democratic nominee Albert Brewer won the election as he faced no opposition, thereby retaining Democratic control over the office of lieutenant governor. Brewer was sworn in as the 21st lieutenant governor of Alabama on January 17, 1967.

=== Results ===
Alabama lieutenant gubernatorial election, 1966
Party	Candidate	Votes	%
Democratic	Albert Brewer	364,473	100.0
Total votes		364,473	100.00
Democratic hold			
