= 2006 Alabama lieutenant gubernatorial election =

- November 7, 2006
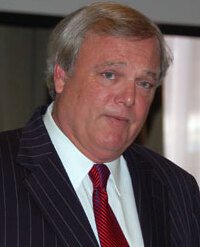

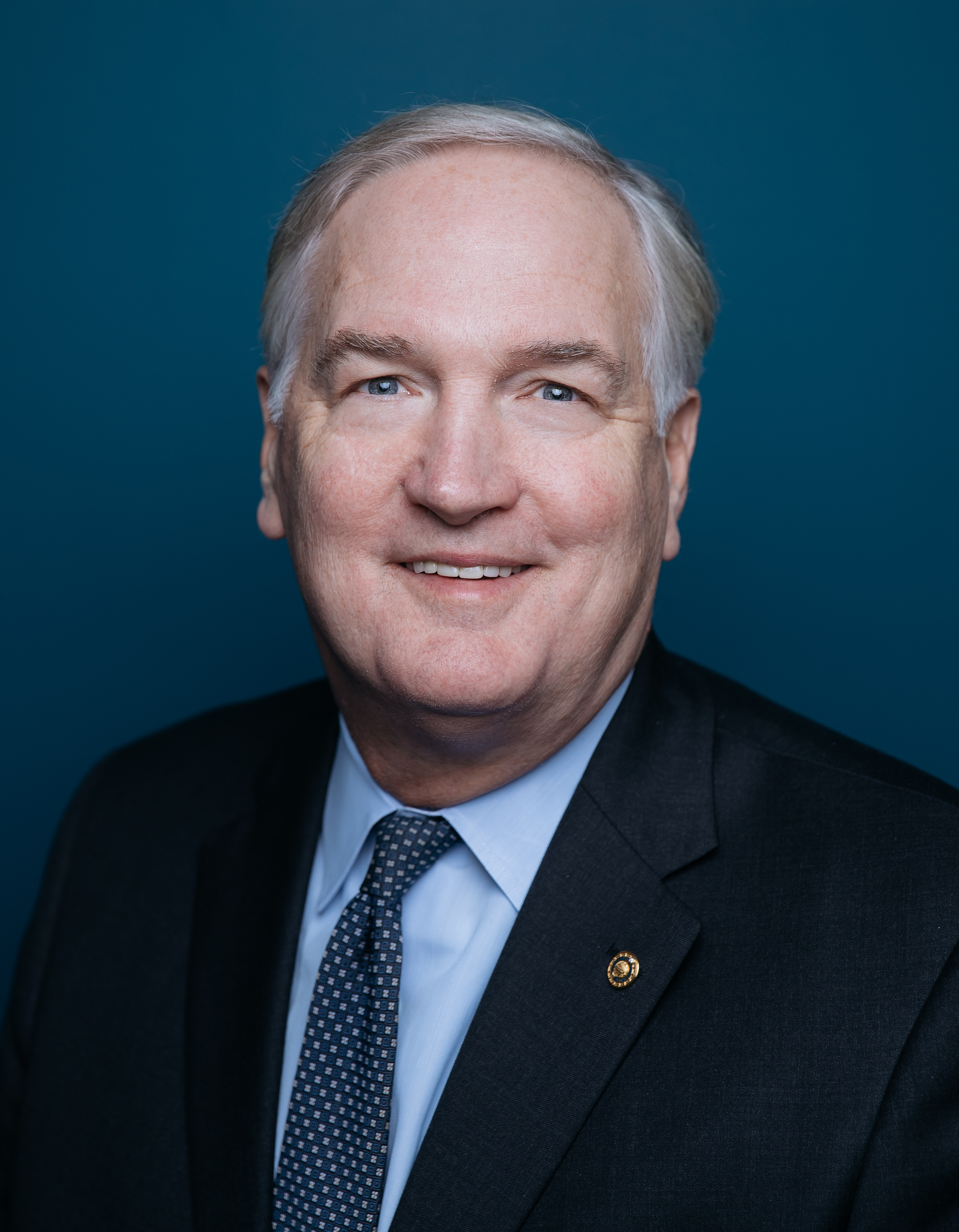
Nominee	Jim Folsom Jr.	Luther Strange
Party	Democratic	Republican
Popular vote	629,268	610,982
Percentage	50.61%	49.14%
- County results Folsom: 50–60% 60–70% 70–80% 80–90% Strange: 50–60% 60–70% 70–80%
Lieutenant Governor before election
Lucy Baxley
Democratic
Elected Lieutenant Governor
Jim Folsom Jr.
Democratic

The 2006 Alabama lieutenant gubernatorial election was held on November 7, 2006, to elect the lieutenant governor of Alabama. Democratic incumbent Lucy Baxley chose to unsuccessfully run for governor of Alabama rather than seek a second term. The Democratic nominee, Jim Folsom Jr., who had previously served as both governor and lieutenant governor of Alabama, won the election, defeating Republican lawyer Luther Strange by a narrow margin of 1.47 percentage points.

As of 2026, this is the last time a Democrat has been elected lieutenant governor of Alabama as well as the last time Alabama elected a governor and lieutenant governor of separate political parties, since this election coincided with Republican Governor Bob Riley's re-election.

== Democratic primary ==
Folsom was unopposed for the Democratic nomination, so no primary was held.

== Republican primary ==
=== Candidates ===
- Hilbun "HA" Adams, cabinetmaker and former Israeli soldier
- Mo Brooks, member of the Madison County Commission (1996–2011)
- George Wallace Jr., member of the Alabama Public Service Commission (1999–2007), former Alabama state treasurer (1987–1995), and son of former governor George Wallace
- Luther Strange, lawyer

=== First round ===
First round election results
Party	Candidate	Votes	%
Republican	Luther Strange	208,558	48.13%
Republican	George Wallace Jr.	144,619	33.37%
Republican	Mo Brooks	67,773	15.64%
Republican	Hilbun "HA" Adams	12,413	2.86%

=== Runoff election ===
Runoff election results
Party	Candidate	Votes	%
Republican	Luther Strange	108,904	54.81%
Republican	George Wallace Jr.	89,788	45.19%

== General election ==
=== Candidates ===
- Jim Folsom Jr., former governor of Alabama (1993–1995), and former lieutenant governor of Alabama (1987–1993) (Democratic)
- Luther Strange, lawyer (Republican)

=== Results ===
2006 Alabama lieutenant gubernatorial election results
Party	Candidate	Votes	%	±%
Democratic	Jim Folsom Jr.	629,268	50.61%	−0.87%
Republican	Luther Strange	610,982	49.14%	+2.38%
Write-ins		3,029	0.24%	+0.1%
Total votes		1,243,279	100.00%	
Democratic hold				
