= Robert F. Ligon =

American politician (1823–1901)

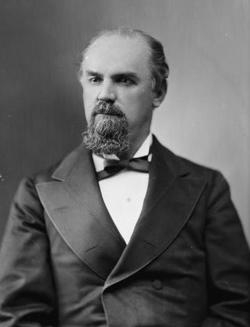

Member of the U.S. House of Representatives from Alabama's 5th district
- In office March 4, 1877 – March 3, 1879
- Preceded by: John Henry Caldwell
- Succeeded by: Thomas Williams

4th Lieutenant Governor of Alabama
- In office 1874–1876
- Governor: George S. Houston
- Preceded by: Alexander McKinstry
- Succeeded by: office abolished (1876–1903); Russell M. Cunningham (1903)

Member of the Alabama Senate
- In office 1861–1864

Member of the Alabama House of Representatives
- In office 1849–1850

Personal details
- Born: December 16, 1823 Watkinsville, Georgia, US
- Died: October 11, 1901 (aged 77) Montgomery, Alabama, US
- Party: Democratic

Robert Fulwood Ligon (December 16, 1823 – October 11, 1901) was the fourth lieutenant governor of Alabama. A Democrat, Ligon served Governor George S. Houston of the same political party from 1874 to 1876. Ligon also served in the United States House of Representatives.

The son of Robert and Wilhelmina (Fulwood) Ligon, Robert Ligon was born in Watkinsville, Georgia. Ligon began his education in the local schools of Watkinsville and later attended the University of Georgia. After graduating, Ligon moved to Tuskegee, Alabama to study law under Judge David Clopton before being admitted to the Alabama bar association. Before the American Civil War, Ligon served Alabama as a state representative, and he was a state senator in 1864.

In 1874, Ligon was elected as Lieutenant Governor. Although Ligon served his full two-year term as Lieutenant Governor, the position was eliminated in 1875 and would not be reestablished until adoption of the Alabama Constitution in 1901. Upon completion of his term, Ligon was elected to and served in the United States Congress from 1877 to 1879. He died at age 77 in Montgomery, Alabama, and was buried at Oakwood Cemetery.

Political offices
Preceded by Alexander McKinstry	Lieutenant Governor of Alabama; 1874–1876	Succeeded by Office abolished
U.S. House of Representatives
Preceded by John Henry Caldwell	Member of the U.S. House of Representatives from Alabama's 5th congressional district March 4, 1877 – March 3, 1879	Succeeded by Thomas Williams
