= Russell McWhortor Cunningham =

American physician and politician (1855–1921)

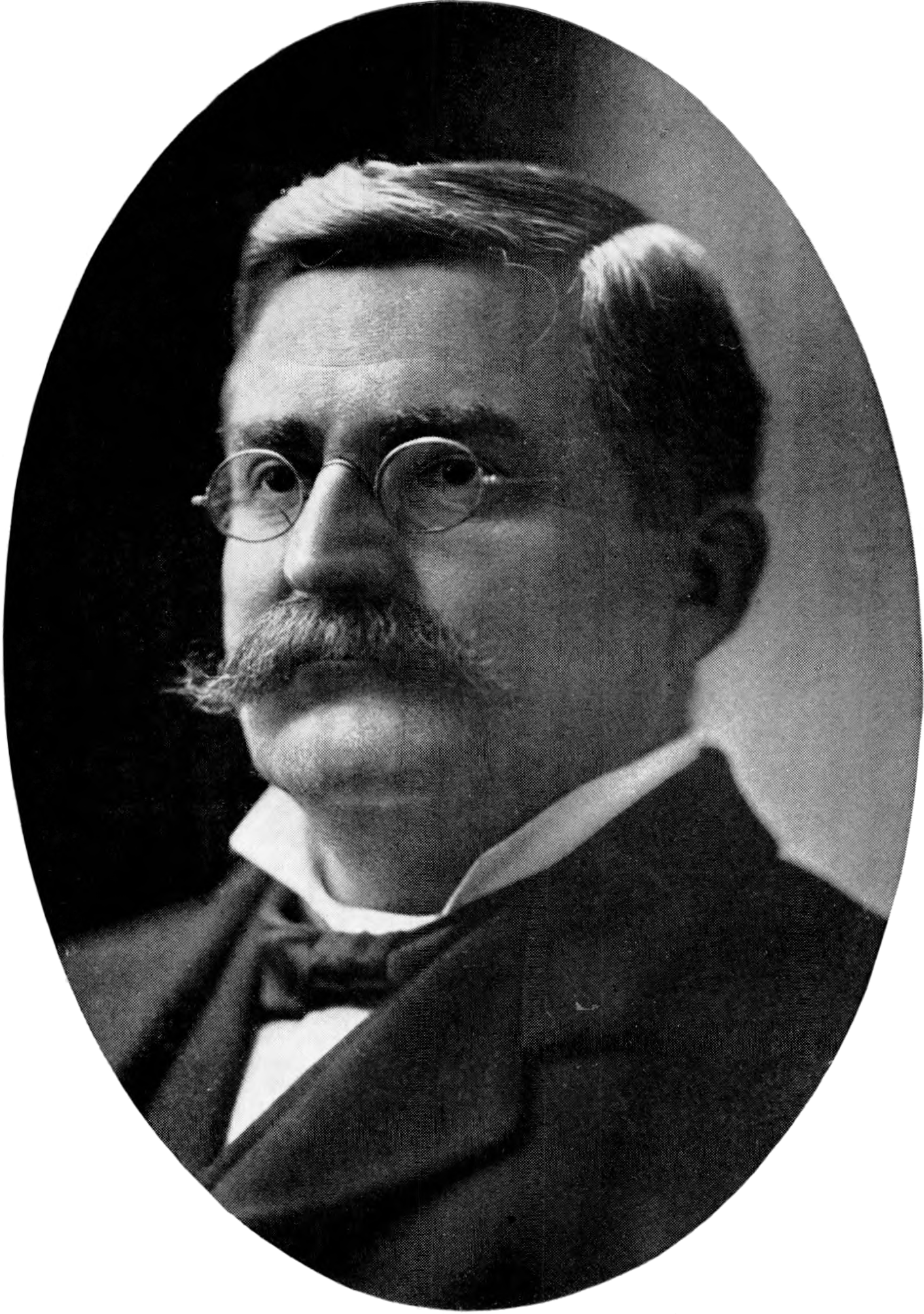

Acting Governor of Alabama
- In office April 25, 1904 – March 5, 1905; During Governor William D. Jelks' medical leave

5th Lieutenant Governor of Alabama
- In office 1903–1907
- Governor: William Jelks
- Preceded by: Robert F. Ligon (1876)
- Succeeded by: Henry B. Gray

Member of the Alabama Senate from the Jefferson County district
- In office 1896–1900

Member of the Alabama House of Representatives from the Franklin County district
- In office 1880–1881

Personal details
- Born: August 25, 1855 Mount Hope, Lawrence County, Alabama, US
- Died: June 6, 1921 (aged 65) Birmingham, Alabama, US
- Party: Democratic
- Children: 1
- Profession: Politician, physician

Russell McWhortor Cunningham (sometimes McWhorter; August 25, 1855 – June 6, 1921) was an American physician and politician. A Democrat, he was the Lieutenant Governor of Alabama and for a time acting Governor of Alabama.

Born in Lawrence County, Alabama, Cunningham studied medicine and served in numerous public health offices. As a politician, he served in both chambers of the Alabama Legislature. He later served as Lieutenant Governor, then spent some time as acting Governor in the absence of William D. Jelks. He passed many reforms throughout his career.

== Early life and education ==
Cunningham was born on August 25, 1855, in Mount Hope, Lawrence County, Alabama, the son of Moses Winslow Cunningham and Nancy Caroline (née Russell) Cunningham. He was educated at local public schools. At age 17, he worked as an educator and farmer, using his earnings to fund his further education.

Cunningham studied medicine, beginning in March 1871, under John M. Clark, a physician from North Alabama. In 1874 and 1875, he attended the University of Louisville School of Medicine, then in 1878 and 1879, attended the New York University Grossman School of Medicine, graduating from there.

== Medical career ==
Cunningham began practicing medicine in 1876, in Franklin County. In 1881, he was made the physician of Wetumpka State Penitentiary. As penitentiary physician, he moved to Wetumpka, where he also practiced privately. He helped push for prison reform which greatly lowered the mortality rate of prisoners. In 1883, he moved to Birmingham, as a newly-passed law required the physician to practice where the majority of convicts worked, which at the time was at the nearby Pratt Mines.

In 1885, Cunningham was made the in-house physician of the Pratt Mines, as well as the Tennessee Coal, Iron and Railroad Company and the Alabama Steel and Ship Building Company. In Ensley, Birmingham, he operated an infirmary. He, alongside eight other physicians, founded a medical school in Birmingham, in October 1894. He also held the office of Jefferson County health officer and led numerous health institutions.

== Political career ==
A Democrat, Cunningham entered politics to forward his career in medicine, which he admitted in his autobiography; he maintained that he still took his roles seriously in spite of this. He represented Franklin County in the Alabama House of Representatives in 1880 and 1881, refusing to run in the following election; Samford University claims he served from 1880 to 1885.

Cunningham re-entered politics in 1896 and was elected to the Alabama Senate, representing Jefferson County from then until 1900; in 1898, he was president pro tempore of the Senate. His voterbase primarily consisted of supporters of the silver standard, though he never claimed to support the policy himself, notwithstanding his support for the pro-silver William Jennings Bryan for President. In 1900, he was chosen to represent William J. Samford in speaking events, as Samford had become ill.

Cunningham was a delegate to the convention which deliberated on the Alabama Constitution of 1901. A white supremacist, he advocated for amendments which disenfranchised African Americans in the state. The new constitution also reinstated the office of Lieutenant Governor, which he ran for later that same year, with William D. Jelks as his running mate.

Cunningham served as Lieutenant Governor of Alabama from 1903 to 1907. Jelks contracted tuberculosis during his tenure, so from April 25, 1904, to March 5, 1905, was acting Governor of Alabama. As acting Governor, he passed regulations on railroads and convict leasing. He announced his candidacy in the following gubernatorial race, but was overshadowed by B. B. Comer. In his autobiography, he wrote that he was grateful to have lost the election. He was a delegate to the 1908 Democratic National Convention.

Positionally, Cunningham supported the anti-lynching movement, child labor laws, coal mining regulations, fair elections, Prohibition, and public education. Although described as relatively conservative, his policy stances leaned progressive.

== Personal and later life ==
On August 13, 1876, Cunningham married Sue L. Moore; they had one child together. She later died, with Cunningham later marrying Annice Taylor; He was a Baptist, as well as a member of the Knights Templar of the Freemasons.

After losing the gubernatorial election, Cunningham returned to practicing medicine in Jefferson County. He died on June 6, 1921, aged 65, in Birmingham, and was buried at Elmwood Cemetery, in Birmingham.

Political offices
Preceded by Robert F. Ligon	Lieutenant Governor of Alabama; 1903—1907; Acting Governor 1904–1905	Succeeded by Henry B. Gray
