= 1986 Araluen by-election =

19 April 1986
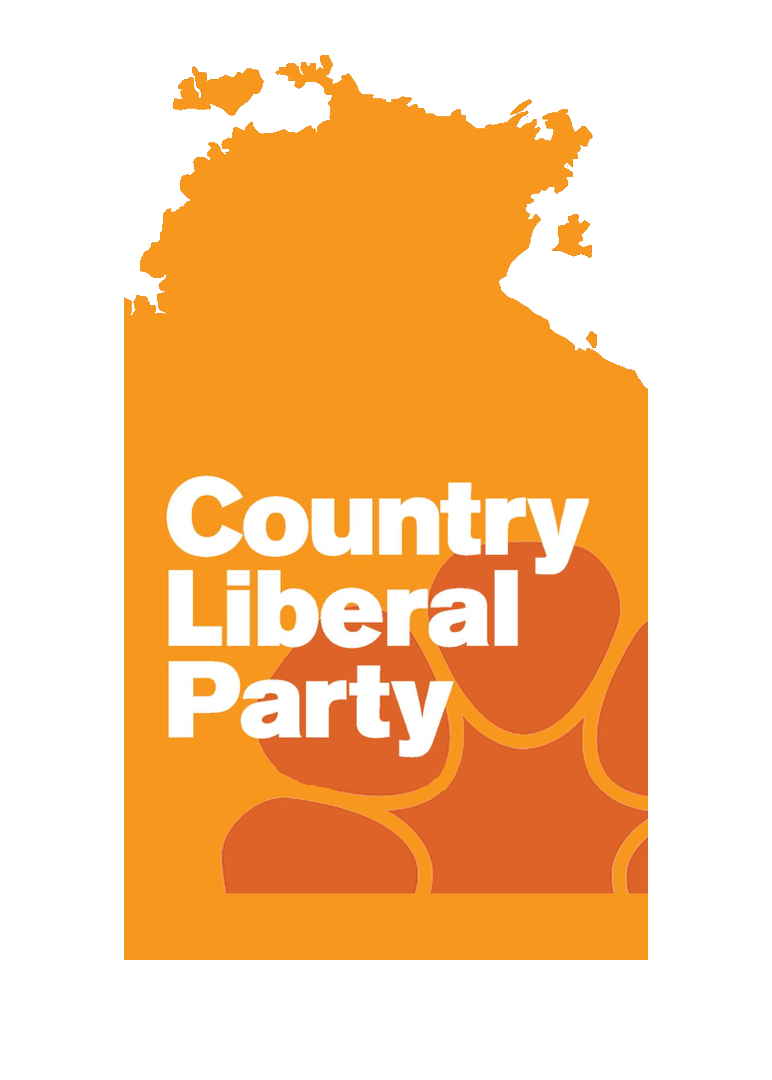

	First party	Second party
Candidate	Eric Poole	Di Shanahan
Party	Country Liberal	Labor
Popular vote	869	658
Percentage	56.9%	43.1%
Swing	▼4.8pp	▲25.2pp
MP before election
Jim Robertson
Country Liberal
Elected MP
Eric Poole
Country Liberal

A by-election for the seat of Araluen in the Northern Territory Legislative Assembly was held on 19 April 1986. The by-election was triggered by the resignation of Country Liberal Party (CLP) member Jim Robertson, a former Cabinet Minister. The seat and its predecessor Gillen had been held by Robertson since its creation in 1974.

The CLP selected Eric Poole, Chairman of the Northern Territory Tourism Commission. The Labor candidate was Di Shanahan.

== Results ==
Araluen by-election, 1986
Party	Candidate	Votes	%	±%
Country Liberal	Eric Poole	869	56.9	−4.8
Labor	Di Shanahan	658	43.1	+25.2
Total formal votes		1,527	95.7	−2.9
Informal votes		69	4.3	+2.9
Turnout		1,596	66.0	−23.1
Country Liberal hold		Swing	N/A	
