= Reuben Newton =

Alabama lawyer and politician

Reuben Newton (c. 1902 - November 1964) was a lawyer and politician in Alabama. A Democrat, he was elected to the Alabama Senate in 1955 representing the 12th District (Fayette, Lamar, and Walker counties). He lived in Jasper, Alabama.

Newton previously had run for governor in the 1950 Democratic Party primary unsuccessfully.

The Alabama Bar Association brought disbarment changes against Newton for unethical conduct relating to the solicitation of business. Albert Patterson testified on Newton's behalf at the hearing shortly before Patterson being assassinated in 1954. Newton was suspended from practicing law for five years which was later reduced to two years. He was reinstated in 1960.

Newton died of Leukemia in November 1964.

== See also ==
- 1950 Alabama gubernatorial election
