= 1986 Alabama lieutenant gubernatorial election =

- November 4, 1986
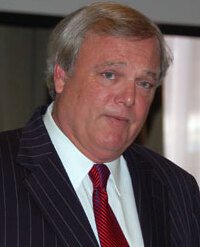

Nominee	Jim Folsom Jr.	Don McGriff
Party	Democratic	Republican
Popular vote	726,111	447,978
Percentage	61.84%	38.16%
- County results Folsom: 50–60% 60–70% 70–80% 80–90% 90–100% McGriff: 50–60%
Lieutenant Governor before election
Bill Baxley
Democratic
Elected Lieutenant Governor
Jim Folsom Jr.
Democratic

The 1986 Alabama lieutenant gubernatorial election was held on November 4, 1986, in order to elect the lieutenant governor of Alabama. Democratic nominee Jim Folsom Jr. defeated Republican nominee Don McGriff.

== Democratic primary ==
In the Democratic primary election, candidate Jim Folsom Jr. received a plurality of the votes (37.72%), thus advancing to a runoff against runner-up John Teague. Folsom won the runoff with 57.49% and thus became the Democratic nominee for lieutenant governor.

=== First Round ===
1986 Democratic lieutenant gubernatorial primary
Party	Candidate	Votes	%
Democratic	Jim Folsom Jr.	331,527	37.72%
Democratic	John Teague	277,899	31.62%
Democratic	Hinton Mitchem	203,112	23.11%
Democratic	Melba Till Allen	66,439	7.56%
Total votes		878,977	100.00%

=== Runoff ===
1986 Democratic lieutenant gubernatorial runoff
Party	Candidate	Votes	%
Democratic	Jim Folsom Jr.	517,724	57.49%
Democratic	John Teague	382,836	42.51%
Total votes		900,560	100.00%

== General election ==
On election day, November 4, 1986, Democratic nominee Jim Folsom Jr. won the election by a margin of 278,133 votes against his opponent Republican nominee Don McGriff, thereby retaining Democratic control over the office of lieutenant governor. Folsom was sworn in as the 25th lieutenant governor of Alabama on January 19, 1987.

=== Results ===
Alabama lieutenant gubernatorial election, 1986
Party	Candidate	Votes	%
Democratic	Jim Folsom Jr.	726,111	61.84
Republican	Don McGriff	447,978	38.16
Total votes		1,174,089	100.00
Democratic hold			
