= 1986 United States House of Representatives election in Wyoming =

- November 4, 1986
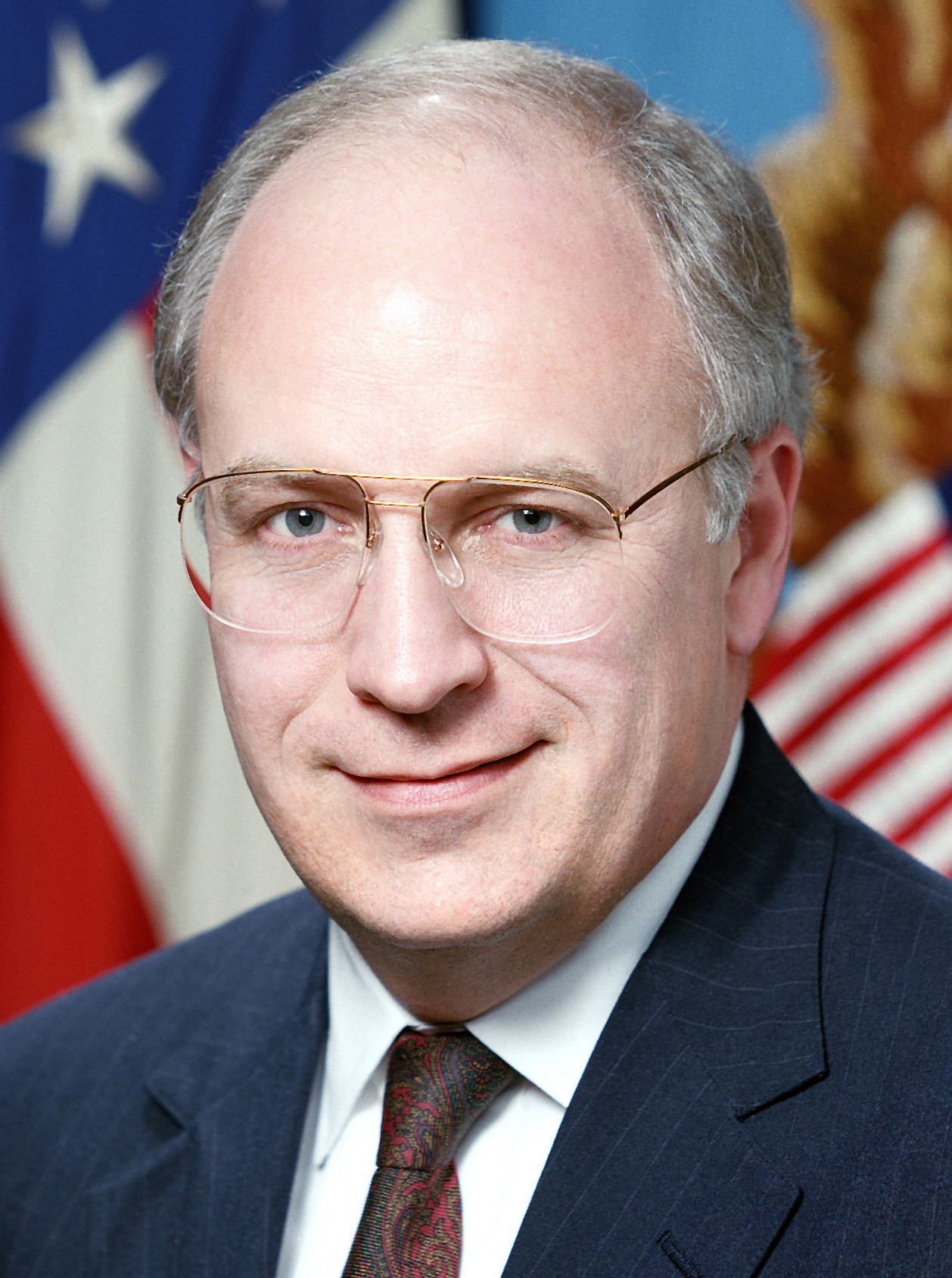

Nominee	Dick Cheney	Rick Gilmore
Party	Republican	Democratic
Popular vote	110,007	48,780
Percentage	69.28%	30.72%
U.S. Representative before election
Dick Cheney
Republican
Elected U.S. Representative
Dick Cheney
Republican

The 1986 United States House of Representatives election in Wyoming was held on November 4, 1986. Incumbent Representative Dick Cheney defeated Rick Gilmore with 69.28% of the vote.

== Republican primary ==
United States House of Representatives Republican primary in Wyoming, 1986
Party	Candidate	Votes	%
Republican	Dick Cheney (incumbent)	75,229	86.53%
Republican	Bob Morris	11,709	13.47%
Total votes		86,938	100%

== Democratic primary ==
United States House of Representatives Democratic primary in Wyoming, 1986
Party	Candidate	Votes	%
Democratic	Rick Gilmore	19,320	53.92%
Democratic	Michael J. Dee	10,325	28.82%
Democratic	Sid Kornegay	6,186	17.26%
Total votes		35,831	100%

== Results ==
United States House of Representatives election in Wyoming, 1986
Party	Candidate	Votes	%
Republican	Dick Cheney (incumbent)	110,007	69.28%
Democratic	Rick Gilmore	48,780	30.72%
Total votes		158,787	100%
