= James C. Inzer =

American politician and lawyer (1887–1967)

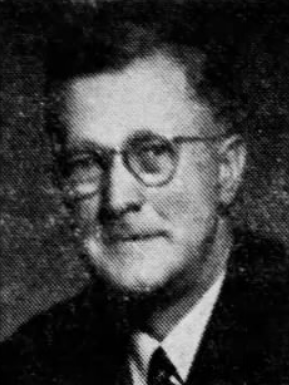
- Izner in 1946

16th Lieutenant Governor of Alabama
- In office 1947–1951
- Governor: Jim Folsom
- Preceded by: Leven H. Ellis
- Succeeded by: James B. Allen

Member of the Alabama Senate from the 6th district
- In office 1923–1927

Personal details
- Born: James Clarence Inzer; March 5, 1887 Springville, Alabama, US
- Died: December 20, 1967 (aged 80) Anniston, Alabama, US
- Party: Democratic
- Education: Howard College; University of Alabama School of Law
- Occupation: Politician, lawyer

James Clarence Inzer Sr. (March 5, 1887 – December 20, 1967) was an American politician and lawyer. A Democrat, he served as Lieutenant Governor of Alabama, under Jim Folsom. Previously, he was a member of the Alabama Senate.

== Early life and education ==
Inzer was born on March 5, 1887, in Springville, Alabama, the son of Henry Judson Izner and Emma (née Lewis) Inzer; The Political Graveyard erroneously names him as James H. Izner. Educated at local public schools, he graduated valedictorian of Howard College in 1908, then in 1910 and 1911, attended the University of Alabama School of Law.

== Career ==
On September 5, 1912, Inzer began practicing law, in Gadsden, joining the partnership Hood, Inzer, Martin, & Suttle. During World War I, he was a non-commissioned officer of the 81st Readiness Division, stationed in France. At times, he was the president of the Etowah County Bar Association and the Alabama State Bar. He was also head of the First National Bank, in Anniston, and chairman of the American National Bank, in Gadsden.

A Democrat, Inzer was a delegate to the 1908 Democratic National Convention, representing Alabama's 8th congressional district. From 1915 until some point, he was a member of the Etowah County Board of Education. He served in the Alabama Senate from 1923 to 1927, representing the 6th district. From 1923 to 1933, he was a member of the Alabama State Board of Education. He then served on the Alabama Democratic Executive Committee, from 1928 to 1936. He was the Lieutenant Governor of Alabama from 1947 to 1951, under Jim Folsom.

== Personal life and death ==
On February 1, 1921, Inzer married Alice Stone Weatherly; they had three children together. He was a Presbyterian, as well as a member of the Freemasons, the Independent Order of Odd Fellows, and the Knights of Pythias. He spent time as president of Gadens's chamber of commerce, rotary club, and country club. He was also a trustee of Samford University. He died on December 20, 1967, aged 80, in Anniston.

Political offices
Preceded by Leven H. Ellis	Lieutenant Governor of Alabama; 1947–1951	Succeeded by James B. Allen
