= Leven H. Ellis =

American politician (1881–1968)

Leven Handy Ellis
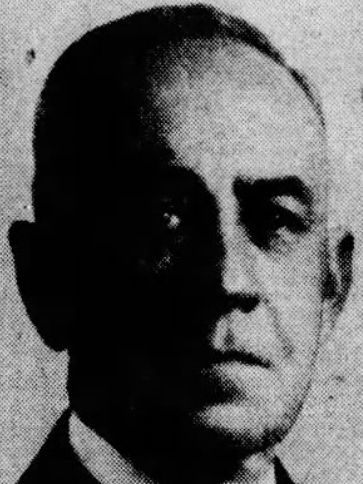
- Ellis in 1942

15th Lieutenant Governor of Alabama
- In office January 19, 1943 – January 20, 1947
- Governor: Chauncey Sparks
- Preceded by: Albert A. Carmichael
- Succeeded by: James C. Inzer

Member of the Alabama Legislature
- In office 1936–1943

Member of the Alabama Senate
- In office 1927–1931

Personal details
- Born: April 6, 1881 Nixburg, Alabama
- Died: January 4, 1968 (aged 86)
- Party: Democratic

Leven Handy Ellis (April 6, 1881 – January 4, 1968) was an American politician who served as the 15th lieutenant governor of Alabama from 1943 to 1947.

Ellis was born in Nixburg, in Coosa County, Alabama. He obtained a B.Ped. degree from Troy Normal School in 1907, and a Bachelor of Law degree from the University of Alabama School of Law in 1909. Ellis practiced law in Columbiana, Alabama. He served as a state senator from 1927 to 1931, a representative in the Alabama Legislature from 1936 to 1943, and a mayor of Columbiana for two terms. In 1948, Ellis served as an Alabama delegate at the Democratic National Convention. After Hubert Humphrey's address, Ellis led 13 members of the Alabama delegation (that was also joined by the entire Mississippi delegation) in a walkout, leading to the creation of the short-lived Dixiecrat political party.

Political offices
Preceded by Albert A. Carmichael	Lieutenant Governor of Alabama; 1943–1947	Succeeded by James C. Inzer
