= Lieutenant Governor of Alabama =

Second-highest elected office in Alabama

- Seal of the lieutenant governor

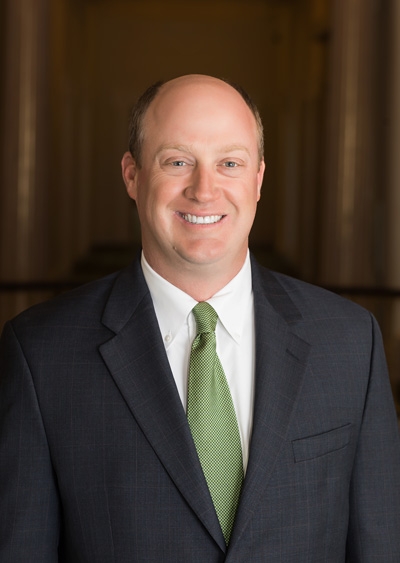
- Incumbent; Will Ainsworth since January 14, 2019
- Government of Alabama
- Style: The Honorable
- Term length: Four years, renewable once consecutively
- Inaugural holder: Andrew J. Applegate
- Formation: 1868
- Succession: First
- Salary: $68,556
- Website: ltgov.alabama.gov

The lieutenant governor of Alabama is the president of the Alabama Senate, elected to serve a four-year term. The office was created in 1868, abolished in 1875, and recreated in 1901. According to the current constitution, should the governor be out of the state for more than 20 days, the lieutenant governor becomes acting governor, and if the governor dies, resigns or is removed from office (via impeachment), the lieutenant governor ascends to the governorship. Earlier constitutions said the powers of the governor devolved upon the successor, rather than them necessarily becoming governor, but the official listing includes these as full governors. The governor and lieutenant governor are not elected on the same ticket.

== History ==
In 1868, the state of Alabama issued a constitution which provided for the office of lieutenant governor. The document prescribed that the officer was to serve as the president of the State Senate and cast tie-breaking votes in that body, and made them first in line of succession to the governor's office. Andrew J. Applegate was the first person to serve as lieutenant governor. In 1875, conservative Democrats determined the content of a new constitution which abolished the office in an attempt to reduce the size of state government. Alabama convened another constitutional convention in 1901. During its session, the incumbent governor died. Partly motivated by the lack of a clearly delineated line of gubernatorial succession, the delegates reestablished the office of lieutenant governor with responsibilities similar to those it previously held. Its constitutional responsibilities have been little altered since.

Since the office's inception, 31 people have served as lieutenant governor of Alabama. Of those, only two have served two terms or more. The first woman to hold the office, Lucy Baxley, served from 2003 to 2007.

== Duties, powers, and structure ==
The lieutenant governor serves as president of the State Senate and assumes the office of governor in the event the gubernatorial office becomes vacant. Senate rules empower the lieutenant governor to determine the composition of Senate committees and refer bills to committees of their choosing. As a result, the lieutenant governor typically exercises significant influence over the progress of legislation in the body.

The state constitution does not provide any remedy in the event the lieutenant governor's office becomes vacant. In such an instance, their role as the presiding officer of the State Senate is assumed by the Senate president pro tempore.

== List ==
Lieutenant governors of the State of Alabama
No.	Lieutenant Governor	Term in office	Party	Election	Governor (Note: Lieutenant governors represented the same party as their governor unless noted.)
1	Andrew J. Applegate (1833–1870)	July 14, 1868 (Note: Sources, even contemporary reporting, disagree on when William Hugh Smith took office as governor, centering it around July 12, July 13, or July 14. The journal of the Alabama Senate placed it on July 14. However, the Senate journal does not indicate when Applegate was sworn in, and it is possible it was on July 13.) – August 21, 1870 (769 days; died in office)	Republican	1868	William Hugh Smith
—	Vacant	August 21, 1870 – November 26, 1870 (98 days)	Office vacated by death		William Hugh Smith
2	Edward H. Moren (1825–1886)	November 26, 1870 – November 25, 1872 (731 days; lost election)	Democratic	1870	Robert B. Lindsay
3	Alexander McKinstry (1822–1879)	November 25, 1872 – November 24, 1874 (730 days; lost election)	Republican	1872	David P. Lewis
4	Robert F. Ligon (1823–1901)	November 24, 1874 – November 27, 1876 (735 days; office abolished)	Democratic	1874	George S. Houston
Office did not exist from November 28, 1876, to January 19, 1903
5	Russell McWhortor Cunningham (1855–1921)	January 19, 1903 – January 14, 1907 (1457 days; term-limited) (Note: Under the 1901 constitution, lieutenant governors were not eligible to succeed themselves.)	Democratic	1902	William D. Jelks (Note: Cunningham acted as governor from April 25, 1904, to March 5, 1905, while Jelks was absent from the state.)
6	Henry B. Gray (1867–1919)	January 14, 1907 – January 16, 1911 (1464 days; term-limited)	Democratic	1906	B. B. Comer
7	Walter D. Seed Sr. (1864–1932)	January 17, 1911 (Note: The constitutional start date for 1911 was January 16, and that is when Governor Emmet O'Neal and Lieutenant Governor Walter D. Seed Sr. were sworn in. However, the Alabama Supreme Court ruled in the case of Oberhaus v. State ex rel. McNamara that, regardless of when the swearing in took place, B. B. Comer's gubernatorial term did not end until the end of Monday, and O'Neal's term did not begin until the first minute of the next day. This precedent appears to have quietly continued, as coverage of Robert J. Bentley's inauguration in 2011 noted he would not officially take office until midnight. As lieutenant governors are elected to the same term as governor, lieutenant governors since 1911 that served to the end of their term are noted as leaving office on Monday, and their successor taking office on Tuesday.) – January 18, 1915 (1463 days; term-limited)	Democratic	1910	Emmet O'Neal
8	Thomas Kilby (1865–1943)	January 19, 1915 – January 20, 1919 (1463 days; term-limited)	Democratic	1914	Charles Henderson
9	Nathan Lee Miller (1866–1934)	January 21, 1919 – January 15, 1923 (1456 days; term-limited)	Democratic	1918	Thomas Kilby
10	Charles S. McDowell (1871–1943)	January 16, 1923 – January 17, 1927 (1463 days; term-limited)	Democratic	1922	William W. Brandon (Note: McDowell acted as governor from July 10, 1924, to July 11, 1924, while Brandon was absent from the state.)
11	William C. Davis (1867–1934)	January 18, 1927 – January 19, 1931 (1463 days; term-limited)	Democratic	1926	Bibb Graves
12	Hugh Davis Merrill (1877–1954)	January 20, 1931 – January 14, 1935 (1456 days; term-limited)	Democratic	1930	Benjamin M. Miller
13	Thomas E. Knight Jr. (1898–1937)	January 15, 1935 – May 17, 1937 (854 days; died in office)	Democratic	1934	Bibb Graves
—	Vacant	May 17, 1937 – January 16, 1939 (610 days)	Office vacated by death		Bibb Graves
14	Albert A. Carmichael (1895–1952)	January 17, 1939 – January 18, 1943 (1463 days; term-limited)	Democratic	1938	Frank M. Dixon
15	Leven H. Ellis (1881–1968)	January 19, 1943 – January 20, 1947 (1463 days; term-limited)	Democratic	1942	Chauncey Sparks
16	James C. Inzer (1887–1967)	January 21, 1947 – January 15, 1951 (1456 days; term-limited)	Democratic	1946	Jim Folsom
17	James Allen (1912–1978)	January 16, 1951 – January 17, 1955 (1463 days; term-limited)	Democratic	1950	Gordon Persons
18	William G. Hardwick (1910–1993)	January 18, 1955 – January 19, 1959 (1463 days; term-limited)	Democratic	1954	Jim Folsom
19	Albert Boutwell (1904–1978)	January 20, 1959 – January 14, 1963 (1456 days; term-limited)	Democratic	1958	John M. Patterson
20	James Allen (1912–1978)	January 15, 1963 – January 16, 1967 (1463 days; term-limited)	Democratic	1962	George Wallace
21	Albert Brewer (1928–2017)	January 17, 1967 – May 7, 1968 (477 days; succeeded to governor)	Democratic	1966	Lurleen Wallace (Note: Brewer was acting governor on July 25, 1967, when Wallace had been absent from the state for 20 days; she returned to the state later that day.) (died May 7, 1968)
—	Vacant	May 7, 1968 – January 18, 1971 (987 days)	Office vacated by succession to governor		Albert Brewer
22	Jere Beasley (b. 1935)	January 19, 1971 – January 15, 1979 (2919 days; term-limited) (Note: Under a 1968 amendment to the constitution, lieutenant governors are eligible to succeed themselves once.)	Democratic	1970	George Wallace (Note: Beasley acted as governor from June 5, 1972, to July 7, 1972, while Wallace was absent from the state.)
22	Jere Beasley (b. 1935)	January 19, 1971 – January 15, 1979 (2919 days; term-limited)	Democratic	1974	George Wallace
23	George McMillan (1943–2025)	January 16, 1979 – January 17, 1983 (1463 days; retired) (Note: McMillan instead ran unsuccessfully for the Democratic nomination for governor.)	Democratic	1978	Fob James
24	Bill Baxley (b. 1941)	January 18, 1983 – January 19, 1987 (1463 days; retired) (Note: Baxley instead ran unsuccessfully for the Democratic nomination for governor.)	Democratic	1982	George Wallace
25	Jim Folsom Jr. (b. 1949)	January 20, 1987 – April 22, 1993 (2285 days; succeeded to governor)	Democratic	1986	H. Guy Hunt (Note: Represented the Republican Party) (removed April 22, 1993)
25	Jim Folsom Jr. (b. 1949)	January 20, 1987 – April 22, 1993 (2285 days; succeeded to governor)	Democratic	1990	H. Guy Hunt (removed April 22, 1993)
—	Vacant	April 22, 1993 – January 16, 1995 (635 days)	Office vacated by succession to governor		Jim Folsom Jr.
26	Don Siegelman (b. 1946)	January 17, 1995 – January 18, 1999 (1463 days; elected governor)	Democratic	1994	Fob James
27	Steve Windom (b. 1949)	January 19, 1999 – January 20, 2003 (1463 days; retired) (Note: Windom instead ran unsuccessfully for the Republican nomination for governor.)	Republican	1998	Don Siegelman (Note: Represented the Democratic Party)
28	Lucy Baxley (1937–2016)	January 21, 2003 – January 15, 2007 (1456 days; retired) (Note: Baxley instead ran unsuccessfully for governor.)	Democratic	2002	Bob Riley
29	Jim Folsom Jr. (b. 1949)	January 16, 2007 – January 17, 2011 (1463 days; lost election)	Democratic	2006	Bob Riley
30	Kay Ivey (b. 1944)	January 18, 2011 – April 10, 2017 (2275 days; succeeded to governor)	Republican	2010	Robert J. Bentley (resigned April 10, 2017)
30	Kay Ivey (b. 1944)	January 18, 2011 – April 10, 2017 (2275 days; succeeded to governor)	Republican	2014	Robert J. Bentley (resigned April 10, 2017)
—	Vacant	April 10, 2017 – January 14, 2019 (645 days)	Office vacated by succession to governor		Kay Ivey
31	Will Ainsworth (b. 1981)	January 15, 2019 – Incumbent (Note: Ainsworth's second term began on January 17, 2023, and will expire January 18, 2027; he will be term-limited.) (in office 2847 days)	Republican	2018	Kay Ivey
31	Will Ainsworth (b. 1981)	January 15, 2019 – Incumbent (in office 2847 days)	Republican	2022	Kay Ivey

== Bibliography ==
- "Alabama Lieutenant Governors". Alabama Department of Archives & History.
- Sobel, Robert (1978). Biographical directory of the governors of the United States, 1789-1978, Vol. I. Meckler Books. ISBN 9780930466015.
- Thorpe, Francis Newton, ed. (1909). The Federal and State Constitutions, Colonial Charters, and Other Organic Laws of the States, Territories, and Colonies Now or Heretofore Forming the United States of America. Vol. 1. Government Printing Office.
