= 1986 French regional elections =

16 March 1986	1992 →

26 Regional Presidencies
- Presidents elected by region: Rally for the Republic; Union for French Democracy; Socialist Party; Miscellaneous left

Regional elections were held in France on 16 March 1986. These were the first regional elections in France. French left-wing parties promised the establishment of regional governments in the 1970s. When the Socialist Party was elected to government in 1981, they implemented territorial reform.

At stake were the presidencies of each of France's 26 régions, which, although lacking legislative autonomy, manage sizeable budgets.

The parliamentary right, led by the conservative Rally for the Republic and the centre-right Union for French Democracy won a landslide, winning 20 of 22 metropolitan regional presidencies. The Socialists only won the Limousin and the Nord-Pas de Calais region.

The election was conducted using the D'Hondt method and a closed list proportional representation, with a threshold of five percent of valid votes being applied regionally.
