= Boswell Amendment =

1946 Alabama Amendment 4
- November 5, 1946
- "The Boswell Amendment"

Results
Choice	Votes	%
Yes	89,163	53.71%
No	76,843	46.29%
County results
Yes
90–100%
80–90%
70–80%
60–70%
50–60%
No
80–90%
70–80%
60–70%
50–60%

1946 Alabama Amendment 4, also known as the Boswell Amendment, was an amendment to the Alabama Constitution that appeared on the general election ballot on November 5, 1946, in Alabama. First proposed by E. C. "Bud" Boswell, state representative from Geneva County, in 1945, the amendment as it passed required residents who desired to vote to be able to "explain and understand" any part of the U.S. Constitution, and repealed a provision that allowed any resident with $300.00 of taxable property to vote regardless of their literacy. This amendment was proposed after the United States Supreme Court ruled against Texas's white primary in 1944's Smith v. Allwright, in order to keep Black Americans from registering to vote, with Boswell stating the amendment's purpose was to "maintain white supremacy". The amendment passed with 53.71% of the popular vote.

A legal challenge was raised in federal court by ten African American residents of Mobile County alleging racial discrimination by its board of election registrars. A federal tribunal invalidated the amendment on January 7, 1949, finding it unconstitutional. Attorney General of Alabama Albert A. Carmichael appealed the decision to the Supreme Court of the United States, which declined to review the lower court's decision in March 1949.

The election took place concurrently with elections for U.S. Senate, U.S. House, governor, state senate, state house, and numerous other state and local offices.

== Background and legislative history ==
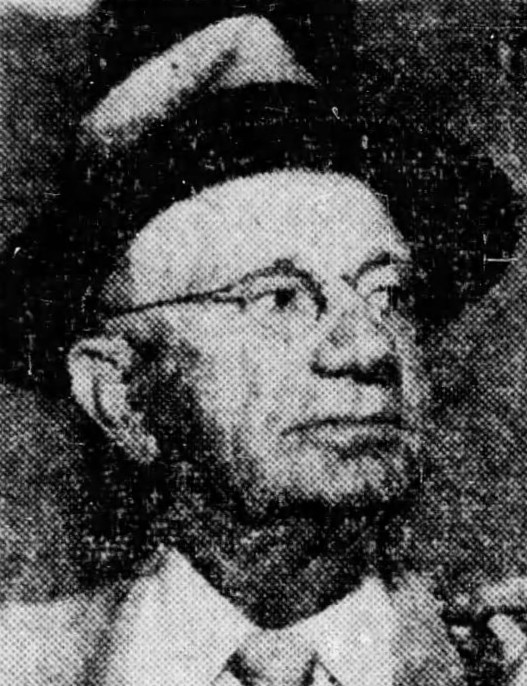
State representative from Geneva County E. C. "Bud" Boswell was the namesake of and introduced the constitutional amendment.

On April 3, 1944, the Supreme Court of the United States ruled 8–1 against Texas's white primary in the case Smith v. Allwright. President pro tempore of the Alabama Senate James A. Simpson described the ruling as "the gravest threat to white supremacy since Reconstruction". Chair of the State Democratic Executive Committee Gessner T. McCorvey pledged to "maintain white supremacy in Alabama" and to "conduct a white primary in May and we will find a way to continue our way of allowing the white people of Alabama in their own way — Somehow." The 1945 Alabama legislative session began in May, and McCorvey sent an open letter to state legislators, urging them to keep the poll tax and to further restrict voter registration.

In June of the 1945 legislative session, state representative E. C. "Bud" Boswell from Geneva County proposed an amendment, dubbed the Boswell Amendment, that would have restricted voter registration. It would repeal a provision that allowed anyone regardless of their literacy to register to vote provided they had $300.00 in taxable property. That figure was set by the 1901 Alabama Constitution, and by 1945 could be easily satisfied, as according to McCorvey, "every Tom, Dick and Harry has an automobile and this safeguard is no longer effective." It would also require voter registrants to be able read and write any part of the United States Constitution, and to "understand such article" to the satisfaction of the county board of registrars. The clause requiring registrants to understand the Constitution would have, according to McCorvey, "enable [the county board of registrars] to prevent from registering those elements in our community which have not yet fitted themselves for self-government."

Boswell stated that the purpose of the amendment was to "maintain white supremacy" at state polls in Alabama. The proposal received unanimous support in the Alabama House of Representatives, with eighty representatives voting in favor and zero against. In the Alabama Senate, twenty-seven senators voted in favor, and three senators opposed. The amendment was placed on the November 1946 general election ballot.

Senate vote on the Boswell Amendment
June 1945	Party	Total votes
June 1945	Democratic	Total votes
Yea	27	27
Nay	3	3
Absent	5	5
Result: Passed
Roll call vote: Senator / Party / District / Residence / Vote; Lawrence K. Andrews / D / 26th / Union Springs / Yea; J. B. Benson / D / 5th / Scottsboro / Yea; Charles S. Bentley / D / 34th / Goodwater / Nay; J. Monroe Black / D / 16th / Fort Deposit / Absent; Gerald Bradford / D / 19th / Marion / Yea; Douglas Brown / D / 23rd / Ozark / Yea; O. D. Carlton / D / 20th / Thomaston / Yea; Silas D. Cater Sr. / D / 28th / Montgomery / Yea; Preston C. Clayton / D / 24th / Clayton / Yea; Lem J. Cobb / D / 29th / Centre / Absent; M. N. Dodson / D / 25th / Troy / Yea; M. W. Espy / D / 35th / Headland / Yea; W. W. Garrett / D / 21st / Uriah / Yea; Tully A. Goodwin / D / 17th / Florala / Yea; J. Bruce Henderson / D / 22nd / Miller's Ferry / Yea; Sam High / D / 6th / Ashville / Yea; Orlan B. Hill / D / 1st / Florence / Yea; Lee Hornsby / D / 10th / Eclectic / Nay; T. J. Jones / D / 18th / Marion / Absent; Richard B. Kelly Jr. / D / 8th / Talladega / Yea; Vincent F. Kilborn / D / 33rd / Mobile / Nay; L. J. Lawson / D / 32nd / Greensboro / Yea; Gordon Madison / D / 11th / Tuscaloosa / Yea; Elvin McCary / D / 7th / Anniston / Yea; Reuben Newton / D / 12th / Jasper / Absent; John H. Pinson / D / 14th / Geiger / Yea; Finis E. St. John Jr. / D / 3rd / Cullman / Yea; Vernon L. St. John / D / 2nd / Town Creek / Yea; Charles E. Shaver / D / 4th / Huntsville / Yea; John L. Sherrer / D / 30th / Dallas County / Yea; James A. Simpson / D / 13th / Birmingham / Yea; Jim Smith Jr. / D / 31st / Tuscumbia / Yea; Geo M. Taylor Jr. / D / 15th / Prattville / Absent; S. L. Toomer / D / 27th / Auburn / Yea; Will O. Walton / D / 9th / LaFayette / Yea

== Contents ==
The proposed amendment reads as follows:

"Shall Section 181 of the Constitution of Alabama be amended to read as follows?"

"Section 181. After the first day of January, nineteen hundred and three, the following persons, and no others, who, if their place of residence shall remain unchanged, will have, at the date of the next general election, the qualifications as to residence prescribed in section 178 of this article, shall be qualified to register as electors provided they shall not be disqualified under section 182 of this constitution: those who can read and write, understand and explain any article of the Constitution of the United States in the English language and who are physically unable to work and those who can read and write, understand and explain any article of the Constitution of the United States in the English language and who have worked or been regularly engaged in some lawful employment, business, or occupation, trade, or calling for the greater part of the twelve months next preceding the time they offer to register, including those who are unable to read and write if such inability is due solely to physical disability; provided, however, no persons shall be entitled to register as electors except those who are of good character and who understand the duties and obligations of good citizenship under a republican form of government."

== Endorsements ==
For

Politicians

- Elbert Boozer, candidate for governor in 1946, probate judge of Calhoun County
- E. C. "Bud" Boswell, state representative from Geneva County and author of the amendment
- Frank M. Dixon, former Governor of Alabama (1939–1943)
- J. Thomas Heflin, former U.S. Senator from Alabama (1920–1931), former U.S. Representative from Alabama's 5th congressional district (1904–1920), and former Secretary of State of Alabama (1903–1904)
- Gessner T. McCorvey, chairman of the Alabama Democratic Executive Committee (1939–1951)
- Gordon Persons, candidate for governor in 1946, president of the Alabama Public Service Commission (1945–1950), associate member of the Alabama Public Service Commission (1943–1945), future Governor of Alabama (1951–1955)
- Joe N. Poole, candidate for governor in 1946, Alabama Commissioner of Agriculture and Industries (1943–1947)
- Chauncey Sparks, Governor of Alabama (1943–1947)

Newspapers

- The Dothan Eagle
- The Selma Times-Journal
- The Opelika-Auburn News
- Alabama Journal
- The Talladega Daily Home
- The Shelby County Democrat
- The Clarke County Democrat
- The Marion Times-Standard
- The Cleburne News
- The Greenville Advocate
- The Franklin County Times
- The Sylacauga News
- The Etowah News-Journal

Organizations

- Alabama Democratic State Executive Committee
Against

Politicians

- J. Lister Hill, U.S. Senator from Alabama (1938–1969) and former U.S. Representative from Alabama's 2nd congressional district (1923–1938)
- Jim Folsom, Democratic nominee in the 1946 Alabama gubernatorial election and future Governor of Alabama (1947–1951, 1955–1959)
- Joseph N. Langan, Democratic nominee for the 33rd Senate District in 1946, former state representative from Mobile County (1939–1943), future Mayor of Mobile
- Oscar Tompkins, former state representative from Houston County
- Lyman Ward, Republican nominee in the 1946 Alabama gubernatorial election

Individuals

- Richard Rives, attorney and future United States appeals judge for the Fifth Circuit (1951–1982)

Newspapers

- The Montgomery Advertiser
- The Anniston Star
- The Decatur Daily
- The Huntsville Times
- The Birmingham News
- The Birmingham Age-Herald
- The Baldwin Times
- The Lee County Bulletin
- The Brewton Standard
- The Piedmont Journal
- Hale County News
- The DeKalb Times
- The Cullman Tribune
- The Florala News
- The Jacksonville Record
Declined to endorse

Politicians

- Albert Boutwell, Democratic nominee for the 13th Senate District in 1946, future Lieutenant Governor of Alabama (1959–1963) and Mayor of Birmingham, Alabama (1963–1967)
- Leven H. Ellis, candidate for governor in 1946, Lieutenant Governor of Alabama (1943–1947), former state legislator

== Results ==
The referendum passed by 12,320 votes, or 7.42 percent. Turnout for the 1946 general election was 11 percent of the voting-age population, and 35 percent of registered voters.

Proposed Amendment No. 4
Choice	Votes	%
For	89,163	53.71
Against	76,843	46.29
Total	166,006	100.00

=== By county ===
Black Belt counties voted overwhelmingly for the amendment, with the industrial Jefferson County narrowly voting in favor. Urban counties Mobile and Montgomery voted against the amendment, as well as much of North Alabama. The cities of Huntsville, Anniston, and Gadsden also opposed the measure.

1946 Alabama Amendment 4 results by county
County	For		Against		Margin		Total
County	#	%	#	%	#	%	Total
Autauga	488	52.70%	438	47.30%	50	5.40%	926
Baldwin	1,152	47.16%	1,291	52.84%	−139	−5.69%	2,443
Barbour	1,024	74.36%	353	25.64%	671	48.73%	1,377
Bibb	1,096	75.43%	357	24.57%	739	50.86%	1,453
Blount	735	28.69%	1,827	71.31%	−1,092	−42.62%	2,562
Bullock	668	82.47%	142	17.53%	526	64.94%	810
Butler	916	60.10%	608	39.90%	308	20.21%	1,524
Calhoun	1,153	40.58%	1,688	59.42%	−535	−18.83%	2,841
Chambers	1,280	70.95%	524	29.05%	756	41.91%	1,804
Cherokee	368	42.40%	500	57.60%	−132	−15.21%	868
Chilton	1,522	62.61%	909	37.39%	613	25.22%	2,431
Choctaw	900	90.82%	91	9.18%	809	81.63%	991
Clarke	1,160	79.94%	291	20.06%	869	59.89%	1,451
Clay	1,351	68.09%	633	31.91%	718	36.19%	1,984
Cleburne	886	59.74%	597	40.26%	289	19.49%	1,483
Coffee	653	42.54%	882	57.46%	−229	−14.92%	1,535
Colbert	816	31.25%	1,795	68.75%	−979	−37.50%	2,611
Conecuh	697	66.83%	346	33.17%	351	33.65%	1,043
Coosa	655	67.11%	321	32.89%	334	34.22%	976
Covington	731	37.26%	1,231	62.74%	−500	−25.48%	1,962
Crenshaw	470	36.35%	823	63.65%	−353	−27.30%	1,293
Cullman	2,915	49.38%	2,988	50.62%	−73	−1.24%	5,903
Dale	614	41.83%	854	58.17%	−240	−16.35%	1,468
Dallas	1,429	72.72%	536	27.28%	893	45.45%	1,965
DeKalb	1,497	43.07%	1,979	56.93%	−482	−13.87%	3,476
Elmore	1,121	45.37%	1,350	54.63%	−229	−9.27%	2,471
Escambia	352	30.48%	803	69.52%	−451	−39.05%	1,155
Etowah	1,147	25.11%	3,420	74.89%	−2,273	−49.77%	4,567
Fayette	1,099	65.07%	590	34.93%	509	30.14%	1,689
Franklin	1,216	40.05%	1,820	59.95%	−604	−19.89%	3,036
Geneva	1,000	56.66%	765	43.34%	235	13.31%	1,765
Greene	685	91.58%	63	8.42%	622	83.16%	748
Hale	813	87.33%	118	12.67%	695	74.65%	931
Henry	599	69.41%	264	30.59%	335	38.82%	863
Houston	1,268	62.28%	768	37.72%	500	24.56%	2,036
Jackson	202	16.74%	1,005	83.26%	−803	−66.53%	1,207
Jefferson	17,173	54.66%	14,245	45.34%	2,928	9.32%	31,418
Lamar	1,362	83.15%	276	16.85%	1,086	66.30%	1,638
Lauderdale	885	31.41%	1,933	68.59%	−1,048	−37.19%	2,818
Lawrence	1,184	73.13%	435	26.87%	749	46.26%	1,619
Lee	896	59.89%	600	40.11%	296	19.79%	1,496
Limestone	708	39.91%	1,066	60.09%	−358	−20.18%	1,774
Lowndes	581	84.82%	104	15.18%	477	69.64%	685
Macon	728	81.07%	170	18.93%	558	62.14%	898
Madison	1,082	29.14%	2,631	70.86%	−1549	−41.72%	3,713
Marengo	997	75.36%	326	24.64%	671	50.72%	1,323
Marion	636	37.11%	1,078	62.89%	−442	−25.79%	1,714
Marshall	1,027	54.40%	861	45.60%	166	8.79%	1,888
Mobile	2,860	47.08%	3,215	52.92%	−355	−5.84%	6,075
Monroe	847	72.89%	315	27.11%	532	45.78%	1,162
Montgomery	2,605	43.07%	3,443	56.93%	−838	−13.86%	6,048
Morgan	1,371	44.40%	1,717	55.60%	−346	−11.20%	3,088
Perry	745	82.41%	159	17.59%	586	64.82%	904
Pickens	1,031	80.11%	256	19.89%	775	60.22%	1,287
Pike	698	46.29%	810	53.71%	−112	−7.43%	1,508
Randolph	1,329	72.58%	502	27.42%	827	45.17%	1,831
Russell	959	92.03%	83	7.97%	876	84.07%	1,042
Shelby	2,102	68.60%	962	31.40%	1,140	37.21%	3,064
St. Clair	1,511	57.94%	1,097	42.06%	414	15.87%	2,608
Sumter	957	94.38%	57	5.62%	900	88.76%	1,014
Talladega	1,672	60.43%	1,095	39.57%	577	20.85%	2,767
Tallapoosa	1,707	67.23%	832	32.77%	875	34.46%	2,539
Tuscaloosa	2,132	55.08%	1,739	44.92%	393	10.15%	3,871
Walker	2,423	43.30%	3,173	56.70%	−750	−13.40%	5,596
Washington	783	77.22%	231	22.78%	552	54.44%	1,014
Wilcox	1,094	94.31%	66	5.69%	1,028	88.62%	1,160
Winston	411	22.74%	1,396	77.26%	−985	−54.51%	1,807

== Aftermath ==
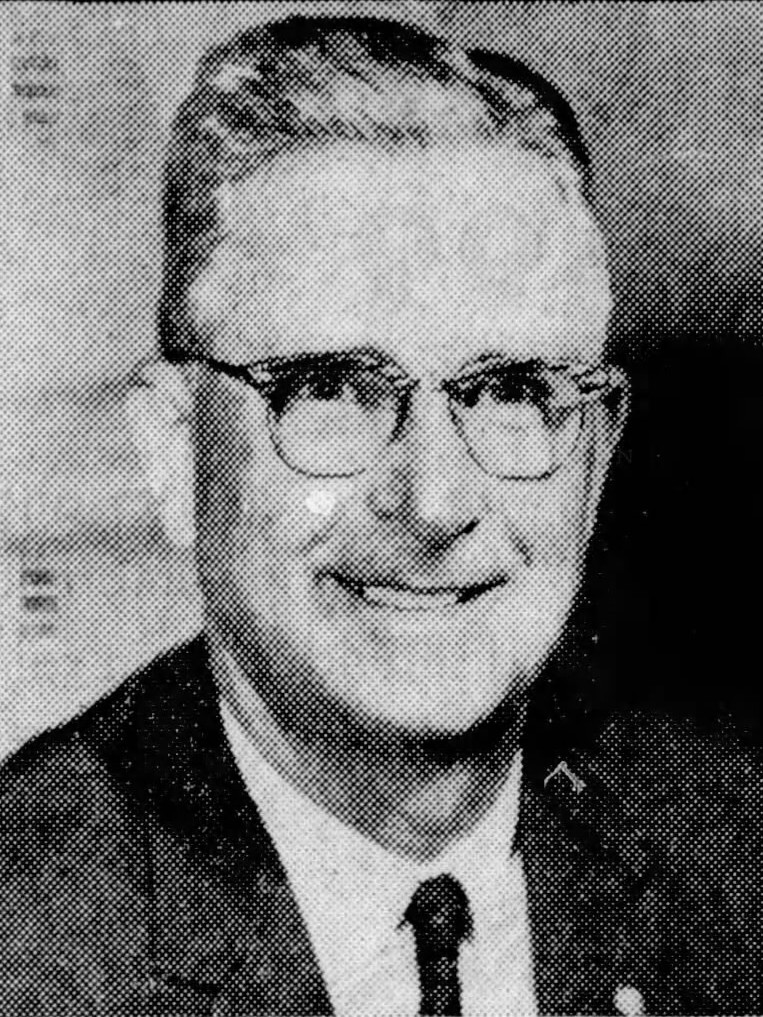
State senator Joseph N. Langan of Mobile County was a leader against the Boswell Amendment's future substitutions.

The proposal received unanimous support in the Alabama House of Representatives, with eighty representatives voting in favor and zero against. In the Alabama Senate, twenty-seven senators voted in favor, and three senators opposed.

In February 1948, the Associated Negro Press reported that four Southern states, Georgia, North Carolina, South Carolina, and Texas were seeking to adopt similar amendments. No state had enacted a similar law by March 1949.

=== Legal challenges ===
Attempts to nullify the amendment started soon after its enactment, with E. D. Nixon, president of the Montgomery, Alabama branch of the NAACP announcing a plan of "an all out attack on the amendment" in October 1947. Ten Black Americans from Mobile County, Alabama made a legal complaint against the law, claiming it discriminated against them based on their race. The three members of the county's board of registrars were the case's defendants, and a federal tribunal heard their case in December 1948. The tribunal, which had also refused to dismiss a similar case from Birmingham, was made up of judges Leon Clarence McCord, John McDuffie, and Clarence H. Mullins. The three judges unanimously chose to invalidate the Boswell Amendment on January 7, 1949, on the grounds that it violated the Fourteenth Amendment and the Fifteenth Amendment to the United States Constitution.

The decision led to a surge in Black voter registration in Mobile County. By January 19, less than two weeks after the decision, approximately four hundred Blacks registered to vote, bringing the county total to around 1,300. Only 104 Blacks successfully registered to vote in the fourteen months preceding the verdict. In March of that year, Attorney General of Alabama Albert A. Carmichael, on behalf of the Mobile County board, appealed the decision to the United States Supreme Court. On March 28, 1949, the Supreme Court upheld the ruling in an unsigned opinion. Only Justice Stanley Forman Reed dissented, not on the decision itself, but on the fact that the Supreme Court did not hear any arguments before issuing its ruling.

=== Substitute laws ===
1951 Alabama Amendment 5 results by county: For (60,357 votes, 50.15%): 50–60%; 60–70%; 70–80%; 80–90%; 90–100%; Against (59,988 votes, 49.85%): 50–60%; 60–70%; 70–80%

During the 1949 legislative session, the Alabama Legislature attempted to create a new amendment which would have similarly stifled votes, resulting in a bill that passed the Alabama House of Representatives. On the last day of the session, state senators Rankin Fite, Guy Hardwick, Broughton Lamberth, Joseph N. Langan, C. B. Harvey, and Fuller Kimbrell, who were allied with Governor Jim Folsom, led a 23-hour filibuster and prevented its passage. The proposed amendment would have required prospective voters to have "good moral character," to "embrace the duties and responsibilities of citizenship," be able to read or write any section of the Constitution, "satisfactorily answer a questionnaire prepared by the State Supreme Court," and must take an anti-Communist oath. It would give county boards of registrars broad powers to determine if people met these requirements. In the 1950 special session, the bill passed the Alabama Senate, but died in the House after it failed to get the three-fifths supermajority vote required to pass a constitutional amendment.

During the 1951 legislative session, the bill finally passed through both houses and was scheduled to be voted on December 11, 1951 as Proposed Amendment No. 5. Opponents argued that the new law would have achieved the same effects of the Boswell Amendment. There was not much campaigning on the proposal, as the main focus of the December election was a $25 million road bond amendment, a total of 24 amendments were up to public approval. The new amendment passed with an even narrower margin than the original amendment, with 60,357 Alabamians voting in favor of the amendment and 59,988 against. 45,661 fewer Alabamians voted on the measure compared to the Boswell Amendment. Voter intimidation continued to plague the state, and the new amendment stood in place until the passage of the 1965 Civil Rights Act.

== See also ==
- Elections in Alabama
- Category:1946 elections in Alabama
  - 1946 United States Senate special election in Alabama
  - 1946 United States House of Representatives elections in Alabama
  - 1946 Alabama gubernatorial election
  - 1946 Alabama Senate election
- 1946 United States elections
