= 1946 Alabama House of Representatives election =

- November 5, 1946

All 106 seats in the Alabama House of Representatives 54 seats needed for a majority
	Majority party	Minority party
Leader	Charles D. Norman (not re-elected speaker)	John B. Weaver (de facto)
Party	Democratic	Republican
Leader since	May 1, 1945	November 7, 1944
Leader's seat	Bullock Co. p. 1	Winston Co.
Last election	105 seats, 97.50%	1 seat, 2.50%
Seats won	105	1
Popular vote	422,807	29,519
Percentage	93.32%	6.52%
- Democratic hold Republican hold Democratic: 50–60% 60–70% 70–80% 80–90% 90–100% Unopposed; Republican: 40–50%
Speaker before election
Charles D. Norman
Democratic
Elected Speaker
William M. Beck
Democratic

The 1946 Alabama House of Representatives election took place on Tuesday, November 5, 1946, to elect 106 representatives to serve four-year terms in the Alabama House of Representatives. Nearly every single representative elected was a member of the Democratic Party, with one Republican, John B. Weaver, being re-elected from Winston County.

89 of the 106 Democratic nominees did not face any opposition in the general election. As the Democratic Party was dominant in the state, state legislative seats were generally decided at the Democratic primary election. The first round of the Democratic primary was held on May 7 with runoff elections taking place on June 4.

Representative William M. Beck of DeKalb County was elected Speaker of the House on January 14, 1947, receiving 58 votes, a majority on the first ballot. Doc Martin of Greene County won 27 votes, and incumbent Speaker Charlie Norman won 17. Beck had the backing of incoming Governor Jim Folsom. 102 of the 106 House representatives voted in the speakership contest, with two being absent, Norman not voting, and the sole Republican not being entitled to a vote. Future governor George Wallace also sought the post, but withdrew his name from contention and supported Beck.

The election took place concurrently with elections for U.S. Senate, U.S. House, governor, state senate, and numerous other state and local offices.

== Summary ==
Party	Candidates			Seats		
Party	Num.	Vote	%	Before	Won	+/–
Democratic	106	422,807	93.32%	105	105	Steady
Republican	17	29,519	6.52%	1	1	Steady
Independents	1	728	0.16%	0	0	Steady
Total	124	453,054	100%	106	106	Steady

== General election results ==
=== By district ===
==== Single-seat ====
District	Democratic			Republican			Independent			Total		
District	Candidate	Votes	%	Candidate	Votes	%	Candidate	Votes	%	Votes	Maj.	Mrg.
Blount	N. C. Denton	824	54.17%	Leon Evans	697	45.83%	—	—	—	1,521	+127	+8.35%
Chilton	C. B. Box	2,405	62.23%	W. L. Sanders	1,460	37.77%	—	—	—	3,865	+945	+24.45%
Colbert	Paul Coburn	2,688	89.63%	J. F. Moore Jr.	311	10.37%	—	—	—	2,999	+2,377	+79.26%
Cullman	E. L. Buckner	4,775	60.95%	Homer F. Mitchell	3,059	39.05%	—	—	—	7,834	+1,716	+21.90%
DeKalb	William M. Beck	5,692	60.40%	Doyide Kirk	3,732	39.60%	—	—	—	9,424	+1,960	+20.80%
Franklin	Frank L. Haynes	3,000	52.98%	John D. Burnes	2,663	47.02%	—	—	—	5,663	+337	+5.95%
Marion	R. R. Wright	1,765	75.46%	James T. Lunsford	574	24.54%	—	—	—	2,339	+1,191	+50.92%
Shelby	Frank Head	2,463	72.57%	S. M. Harvey	931	27.43%	—	—	—	3,394	+1,532	+45.14%
Walker p. 2	A. J. McDanal	4,770	76.06%	J. Sam Gant	1,501	23.94%	—	—	—	6,271	+3,269	+52.13%
Winston	Vester A. Martin	936	32.60%	John B. Weaver	1,207	42.04%	Ben G. Dodd	728	25.36%	2,871	−271	−9.44%
Source: Alabama Official and Statistical Register, 1947 (p. 502–504)

==== Multi-seat ====
Jefferson County election (7 to be elected)
Party	Candidate	Votes	%
Democratic	Will H. Sadler Jr.	29,400	13.42%
Democratic	William Henry Beatty	29,388	13.42%
Democratic	J. Paul Meeks	29,384	13.41%
Democratic	Larry Dumas	29,379	13.41%
Democratic	Wallace Gibson	29,379	13.41%
Democratic	James G. Adams	29,373	13.41%
Democratic	Hugh Kaul	29,364	13.41%
Republican	Richard H. Petty	1,930	0.88%
Republican	L. H. Mason Jr.	1,928	0.88%
Republican	Ray Armstrong	1,925	0.88%
Republican	Gordon M. Gibbs	1,925	0.88%
Republican	Augustus Mackey	1,917	0.88%
Republican	H. Bishop Holliman	1,900	0.87%
Republican	K. G. Springfield	1,859	0.85%
Total votes		219,051	100.00%

=== Elected without opposition ===
Every candidate elected without an opponent was a Democrat.

- Autauga County: G. M. Taylor received 963 votes.
- Baldwin County: L. W. Brannan Jr. received 2,209 votes.
- Barbour County:
  - Place 1: Sims A. Thomas received 1,526 votes.
  - Place 2: George Wallace received 1,526 votes.
- Bibb County: J. Fred Wood received 1,474 votes.
- Bullock County:
  - Place 1: Charles D. Norman received 824 votes.
  - Place 2: Willis L. McIlwain received 826 votes.
- Butler County:
  - Place 1: John Worth Thagard received 1,523 votes.
  - Place 2: Earl McGowin received 1,523 votes.
- Calhoun County:
  - Place 1: John W. Howell received 2,956 votes.
  - Place 2: Tarvey H. Bennett received 3,061 votes.
- Chambers County:
  - Place 1: Roy McClendon received 2,020 votes.
  - Place 2: A. A. Still received 2,024 votes.
- Cherokee County: J. Monroe Mitchell received 1,006 votes.
- Choctaw County: Franklin C. Evans received 1,048 votes.
- Clarke County:
  - Place 1: John F. Gillis received 1,482 votes.
  - Place 2: Earl L. Tucker received 1,478 votes.
- Clay County: E. E. Nelson received 2,035 votes.
- Cleburne County: Pelham J. Merrill received 1,602 votes.
- Coffee County: H. B. Larkins received 1,669 votes.
- Conecuh County: James E. Nettles received 1,097 votes.
- Coosa County: George B. McDonald received 923 votes.
- Covington County: S. R. White received 2,062 votes.
- Crenshaw County: Ira B. Thompson received 1,350 votes.
- Dale County: Jesse B. Adams received 1,505 votes.
- Dallas County:
  - Place 1: William P. Molette received 1,982 votes.
  - Place 2: Hunt Frasier received 1,979 votes.
  - Place 3: Walter C. Givhan received 1,980 votes.
- Elmore County:
  - Place 1: Lee Hornsby received 2,552 votes.
  - Place 2: Harley M. Dobbs received 2,552 votes.
- Escambia County: Flournoy Lovelace received 1,368 votes.
- Etowah County:
  - Place 1: E. L. Roberts received 4,584 votes.
  - Place 2: Ed Miller received 4,576 votes.
- Fayette County: Niles G. Dobbs received 1,335 votes.
- Geneva County: Roland R. Faulk received 1,695 votes.
- Greene County: W. L. Martin Jr. received 763 votes.
- Hale County:
  - Place 1: H. A. Taylor received 966 votes.
  - Place 2: Charles H. Ramey received 967 votes.
- Henry County:
  - Place 1: George T. Knight received 944 votes.
  - Place 2: G. B. Mathison Sr. received 932 votes.
- Houston County: Wallace D. Malone received 1,895 votes.
- Jackson County:
  - Place 1: John S. O'Neal received 1,863 votes.
  - Place 2: John M. Snodgrass received 1,863 votes.
- Lamar County: John F. Hankins received 1,680 votes.
- Lauderdale County:
  - Place 1: Mims Rogers received 2,765 votes.
  - Place 2: Bill Barnett received 2,714 votes.
- Lawrence County: J. B. Richardson received 1,599 votes.
- Lee County:
  - Place 1: Roberts H. Brown received 1,434 votes.
  - Place 2: D. W. Ward received 1,433 votes.
- Limestone County: Bunyan D. Broadwater received 1,930 votes.
- Lowndes County:
  - Place 1: Neil Robinson received 706 votes.
  - Place 2: John M. Bruner received 706 votes.
- Macon County: G. O. Bush received 857 votes.
- Madison County:
  - Place 1: Herman Vann received 3,740 votes.
  - Place 2: William E. Davis received 3,764 votes.
- Marengo County:
  - Place 1: Z. P. Croker Jr. received 1,342 votes.
  - Place 2: Odie Bedford Whitcomb received 1,345 votes.
- Marshall County: J. J. Bedford received 2,314 votes.
- Mobile County:
  - Place 1: Thomas A. Johnston III received 4,940 votes.
  - Place 2: George E. Stone Jr. received 5,004 votes.
  - Place 3: Joseph C. Sullivan received 4,919 votes.
- Monroe County: W. W. Garrett received 1,273 votes.
- Montgomery County:
  - Place 1: S. B. Sightler received 5,831 votes.
  - Place 2: Hubert E. Busby received 5,831 votes.
  - Place 3: Luther Ingalls received 5,831 votes.
  - Place 4: Charles M. Pinkston received 5,831 votes.
- Morgan County:
  - Place 1: Norman W. Harris received 3,106 votes.
  - Place 2: Bill Stewart received 3,063 votes.
- Perry County:
  - Place 1: D. K. Mason Jr. received 915 votes.
  - Place 2: John G. White received 910 votes.
- Pickens County: R. B. Doughty received 1,321 votes.
- Pike County:
  - Place 1: Ira Thompson received 1,621 votes.
  - Place 2: Max Shirley received 1,601 votes.
- Randolph County: A. C. George received 1,760 votes.
- Russell County:
  - Place 1: B. L. Cole received 1,025 votes.
  - Place 2: J. W. Brassell received 1,024 votes.
- St. Clair County: John W. Inzer Jr. received 2,173 votes.
- Sumter County:
  - Place 1: John H. Pinson received 1,011 votes.
  - Place 2: Ira D. Pruitt received 1,011 votes.
- Talladega County:
  - Place 1: J. S. Ganey received 2,618 votes.
  - Place 2: G. Kyser Leonard received 2,627 votes.
- Tallapoosa County:
  - Place 1: Lewis E. Sellers received 2,458 votes.
  - Place 2: Cecil G. Duffee received 2,458 votes.
- Tuscaloosa County:
  - Place 1: Temo Callahan received 3,757 votes.
  - Place 2: J. P. Shelton received 3,774 votes.
- Walker County: Chester M. Black received 4,886 votes.
- Washington County: J. Emmett Wood received 1,043 votes.
- Wilcox County:
  - Place 1: E. T. Harrison received 1,163 votes.
  - Place 2: S. M. Cobb received 1,163 votes.

== 1943–1946 special elections ==
Eleven special elections to the Alabama House of Representatives were held after the 1942 general election.

=== Conecuh County ===
January 3, 1943 Conecuh County special election Resignation of Lamar Kelly
Party	Candidate	Votes	%
Democratic	J. E. Nettles	353	99.44%
Write-in	Robert Jones	2	0.56%
Total votes		355	100.00%
Democratic hold			

=== Lauderdale County ===
May 11, 1943 Lauderdale County special election Resignation of A. L. Maples
Party	Candidate	Votes	%
Democratic	Moody Redd	393	100.00%
Total votes		393	100.00%
Democratic hold			

=== Crenshaw County ===
May 18, 1943 Crenshaw County special election Resignation of Ira B. Thompson
Party	Candidate	Votes	%
Democratic	Walter L. Petrie	422	100.00%
Total votes		422	100.00%
Democratic hold			

=== Etowah County place 1 ===
November 7, 1944 Etowah County place 1 special election Resignation of James B. Allen
Party	Candidate	Votes	%
Democratic	Escar L. Roberts	5,594	100.00%
Total votes		5,594	100.00%
Democratic hold			

=== Etowah County place 2 ===
November 7, 1944 Etowah County place 2 special election Resignation of Albert Rains
Party	Candidate	Votes	%
Democratic	Edward B. Miller	5,551	100.00%
Total votes		5,551	100.00%
Democratic hold			

=== Houston County ===
November 7, 1944 Houston County special election Resignation of William G. Hardwick
Party	Candidate	Votes	%
Democratic	Alto V. Lee	3,350	100.00%
Total votes		3,350	100.00%
Democratic hold			

=== Marengo County place 1 ===
November 7, 1944 Marengo County place 1 special election Resignation of Sibyl Pool
Party	Candidate	Votes	%
Democratic	T. B. Perry	1,779	100.00%
Total votes		1,779	100.00%
Democratic hold			

=== Marengo County place 2 ===
November 7, 1944 Marengo County place 2 special election Resignation of Edward O. Eddins
Party	Candidate	Votes	%
Democratic	H. R. Jones	1,778	100.00%
Total votes		1,778	100.00%
Democratic hold			

=== Sumter County place 2 ===
November 7, 1944 Sumter County place 2 special election Death of George O. Miller
Party	Candidate	Votes	%
Democratic	Ira D. Pruitt	1,093	100.00%
Total votes		1,093	100.00%
Democratic hold			

=== Winston County ===
November 7, 1944 Winston County special election Resignation of Frank Minis Johnson
Party	Candidate	Votes	%
Republican	John B. Weaver	1,506	53.87%
Democratic	J. H. Kelly	852	36.13%
Total votes		2,358	100.00%
Republican hold			

=== Madison County place 1 ===
May 29, 1945 Madison County place 1 special election Resignation of C. J. Owens
Party	Candidate	Votes	%
Democratic	Milton K. Cummings	425	100.00%
Total votes		425	100.00%
Democratic hold			

== See also ==
- 1946 Alabama elections
  - 1946 United States Senate special election in Alabama
  - 1946 United States House of Representatives elections in Alabama
  - 1946 Alabama gubernatorial election
  - 1946 Alabama Senate election
- 1946 United States elections
