= 1946 Alabama Senate election =

- November 5, 1946

All 35 seats in the Alabama State Senate 18 seats needed for a majority
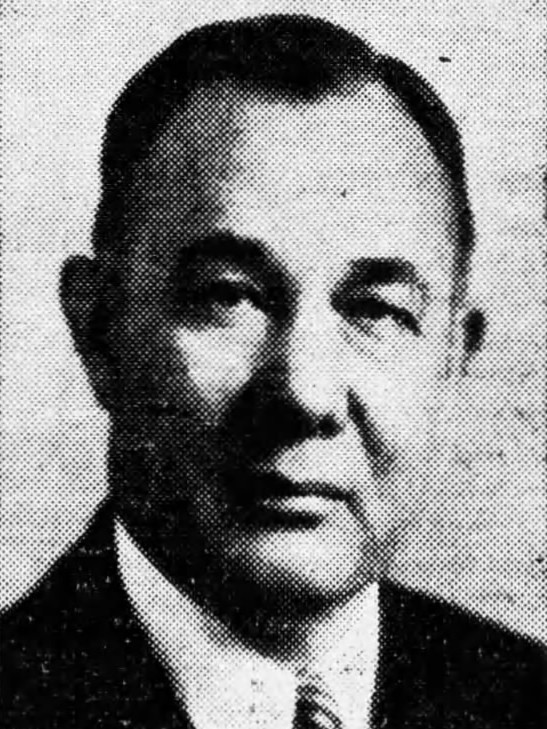

	Majority party	Minority party
Leader	James A. Simpson (did not stand)	—
Party	Democratic	Republican
Leader since	November 16, 1942	—
Leader's seat	13th–Jefferson Co.	—
Last election	35 seats, 99.41%	0 seats, 0.56%
Seats won	35	0
Popular vote	164,226	8,889
Percentage	94.87%	5.13%
- Winners by vote share Democratic: 60–70% 70–80% 90–100% Unopposed
President pro tempore before election
James A. Simpson
Democratic
Elected President pro tempore
J. Bruce Henderson
Democratic

The 1946 Alabama Senate election took place on Tuesday, November 5, 1946, to elect 35 representatives to serve four-year terms in the Alabama Senate. The election used the same districts first drawn by the Alabama Constitution of 1901.

32 of the 35 Democratic nominees did not face any opposition in the general election. As the Democratic Party was dominant in the state, state legislative seats were generally decided at the Democratic primary election. The first round of the Democratic primary was held on May 7 with runoff elections on June 4.

Senator J. Bruce Henderson of Wilcox County was unanimously chosen to be President pro tempore of the Senate on January 14, 1947.

The election took place concurrently with elections for U.S. Senate, U.S. House, governor, state house, and numerous other state and local offices.

== Summary ==
Party	Candidates			Seats		
Party	Num.	Vote	%	Before	Won	+/–
Democratic	35	164,226	94.87%	35	35	Steady
Republican	3	8,889	5.13%	0	0	Steady
Total	38	173,115	100%	35	35	Steady

== Incumbents ==
Most incumbent senators in multi-county districts did not seek re-election, as a gentlemen's agreement compelled state senators to give up their seats to allow a candidate from another county to serve.

=== Won re-election ===
- District 22: J. Bruce Henderson won re-election.
- District 24: Preston C. Clayton won re-election.
- District 28: Silas D. Cater won re-election. Cater succeeded Charles A. Stakley in January 1943 after his resignation.

=== Eliminated in primary ===
- District 3: Finis St. John Jr. lost renomination to C. B. Harvey.
- District 8: Richard B. Kelly Jr. lost renomination to Graham Wright. Kelly succeeded Kenneth A. Roberts in May 1943 after his resignation.
- District 20: O. D. Carlton lost renomination to T. B. Perry.
- District 33: Vincent F. Kilborn lost renomination to Joseph N. Langan.
- District 11: Gordon Madison lost renomination to Henry H. Mize.

=== Did not seek re-election ===
- District 1: Orlan B. Hill unsuccessfully ran for a circuit court judgeship.
- District 2: Vernon L. St. John did not seek re-election.
- District 4: Charles E. Shaver did not seek re-election.
- District 5: J. B. Benson did not seek re-election.
- District 6: Sam High sought the state house seat from St. Clair County, but withdrew for unspecified reasons.
- District 7: Elvin McCary unsuccessfully ran for lieutenant governor.
- District 9: Will O. Walton was elected a circuit court judge.
- District 10: Lee Hornsby did not seek re-election. Was subsequently elected to Elmore County's first state house seat after a special primary in July 1946.
- District 12: Reuben Newton unsuccessfully ran for lieutenant governor.
- District 13: James A. Simpson unsuccessfully ran for U.S. Senate.
- District 14: John H. Pinson was elected to Sumter County's first state house seat.
- District 15: George M. Taylor did not seek re-election.
- District 16: J. Monroe Black did not seek re-election.
- District 17: Tully A. Goodwin did not seek re-election.
- District 18: T. J. Jones did not seek re-election.
- District 19: Gerald Bradford unsuccessfully ran for Clarke County's first state house seat.
- District 21: W. W. Garrett was elected to Monroe County's sole state house seat.
- District 23: Douglas Brown did not seek re-election.
- District 25: M. N. Dodson did not seek re-election.
- District 26: Lawrence K. Andrews did not seek re-election.
- District 27: S. L. Toomer did not seek re-election.
- District 29: Lem J. Cobb unsuccessfully ran for Cherokee County's sole state house seat.
- District 30: John L. Sherrer unsuccessfully ran for Dallas County's first state house seat. Sherrer succeeded Edgar Poe Russell in March 1943 after his resignation in January 1943.
- District 31: Jim Smith Jr. did not seek re-election. Unsuccessfully ran for the 1947 Alabama's 8th congressional district special election.
- District 32: L. J. Lawson did not seek re-election.
- District 34: Charles S. Bentley did not seek re-election.
- District 35: M. W. Espy did not seek re-election.

== General election results ==
=== By district ===
District	Democratic			Republican			Total		
District	Candidate	Votes	%	Candidate	Votes	%	Votes	Maj.	Mrg.
3rd	C. B. Harvey	8,561	63.75%	J. T. Johnson	4,867	36.25%	13,428	+3,694	+27.51%
13th	Albert Boutwell	29,514	93.90%	H. H. Grooms	1,917	6.10%	31,431	+27,597	+87.80%
15th	W. A. Gulledge	5,881	73.64%	A. B. Baxley	2,105	26.36%	7,986	+3,776	+47.28%
Source: Alabama Official and Statistical Register, 1947 (p. 499–501)

=== Elected without opposition ===
Every candidate elected without an opponent was a Democrat.

- District 1: David U. Patton received 4,587 votes.
- District 2: Noble J. Russell received 4,676 votes.
- District 4: R. J. Lowe received 3,765 votes.
- District 5: C. J. Owens received 4,150 votes.
- District 6: James B. Allen received 6,662 votes.
- District 7: Tom Blake Howle received 3,077 votes.
- District 8: Graham Wright received 2,632 votes.
- District 9: Paul J. Hooton received 3,728 votes.
- District 10: Broughton Lamberth received 5,010 votes.
- District 11: Henry H. Mize received 3,764 votes.
- District 12: Fuller Kimbrell received 7,725votes.
- District 14: W. E. Barrett received 2,339 votes.
- District 16: C. Mac Golson received 707 votes.
- District 17: R. G. Kendall Jr. received 4,671 votes.
- District 18: W. H. Cooper received 2,376 votes.
- District 19: Ben N. Glover received 3,572 votes.
- District 20: T. B. Perry received 1,349 votes.
- District 21: G. R. Swift received 4,833 votes.
- District 22: J. Bruce Henderson received 1,163 votes.
- District 23: J. A. Hughes received 3,212 votes.
- District 24: Preston C. Clayton received 1,526 votes.
- District 25: Vernon S. Summerlin received 4,599 votes.
- District 26: Forrest G. Bridges received 1,676 votes.
- District 27: A. L. Patterson received 2,449 votes.
- District 28: Silas D. Carter received 5,831 votes.
- District 29: T. F. Burnside received 6,684 votes.
- District 30: George P. Quarles received 1,980 votes.
- District 31: Rankin Fite received 7,453 votes.
- District 32: James S. Coleman Jr. received 1,725 votes.
- District 33: Joseph N. Langan received 5,102 votes.
- District 34: John E. Gaither received 4,436 votes.
- District 35: W. G. Hardwick received 2,811 votes.

== Democratic primary results ==
=== Runoff results by district ===
Candidates in boldface advanced to the general election.

District	Winner			Loser			Total			Ref
District	Candidate	Votes	%	Candidate	Votes	%	Votes	Maj.	Mrg.	Ref
8th	**Graham Wright**	**3,099**	**66.54%**	Richard Kelly (inc.)	1,558	33.46%	4,657	+1,541	+33.09%	
13th	**Albert Boutwell**	**25,843**	**52.98%**	Emmett Perry	22,933	47.02%	48,776	+2,910	+5.97%	
31st	**Rankin Fite**	**7,205**	**53.78%**	W. B. Mixon	6,193	46.22%	13,398	+1,012	+7.55%	
33rd	**Joseph N. Langan**	**9,109**	**62.26%**	Vincent Kilborn (inc.)	5,522	37.74%	14,631	+3,587	+24.52%	

=== First round results by district ===
Candidates in boldface advanced to either the general election or a runoff, first-place winners with an asterisk (*) did not face a runoff.

District	First place			Runners-up			Others			Total			Ref
District	Candidate	Votes	%	Candidate	Votes	%	Candidate	Votes	%	Votes	Maj.	Mrg.	Ref
2nd	**Noble J. Russell***	6,489	63.42%	Rutledge Thomas	3,742	36.58%	—	—	—	10,231	+2,747	+26.85%	
3rd	**C. B. Harvey***	3,655	56.18%	Finis St. John Jr. (inc.)	2,851	43.82%	—	—	—	6,506	+804	+12.36%	(Note: Cullman returns only. Harvey won all three counties.)
5th	**C. J. Owens***	6,085	51.77%	Claud D. Scruggs	5,669	48.23%	—	—	—	11,754	+416	+3.54%	
7th	**Tom Blake Howle***	3,451	51.87%	C. W. Daugette	3,202	48.13%	—	—	—	6,653	+249	+3.74%	
8th	**Graham Wright***	2,071	54.72%	Richard Kelly (inc.)	1,196	31.60%	A. L. Hanks	518	13.69%	3,785	+875	+23.12%	
10th	**Broughton Lamberth***	6,146	53.93%	Mack Jackson	5,250	46.07%	—	—	—	11,396	+896	+7.86%	
11th	**Henry H. Mize***	6,138	63.86%	Gordon Madison (inc.)	3,474	36.14%	—	—	—	9,612	+2,664	+27.72%	
12th	**Fuller Kimbrell***	6,620	52.88%	J. W. Ayres	5,900	47.12%	—	—	—	12,520	+720	+5.75%	
13th	**Albert Boutwell**	18,665	39.82%	**Emmett Perry**	**12,798**	**27.30%**	2 others (Note: Roger Snyder: 8,338 votes, 17.79%; Jerry Phillips: 7,078 votes, 15.10%)	15,416	32.89%	46,879	+5,867	+12.52%	
14th	**W. E. Barrett***	1,162	63.02%	J. T. Fendley	682	36.98%	—	—	—	1,844	+480	+26.03%	(Note: Sumter returns only. Barrett carried both counties.)
15th	**W. A. Gulledge***	1,195	61.03%	G. C. Walker	763	38.97%	—	—	—	1,958	+432	+22.06%	(Note: Autauga returns only. Gulledge carried Shelby and Autauga, and Walker carried Chilton.)
19th	**Ben N. Glover***	6,136	53.17%	Howard Scott	5,405	46.83%	—	—	—	11,541	+731	+6.33%	
20th	**T. B. Perry***	2,027	53.12%	O. D. Carlton (inc.)	1,789	46.88%	—	—	—	3,816	+238	+6.24%	
22nd	**J. Bruce Henderson (inc.)***	Nominated		Duck Sadler	Lost		—	—	—	Unknown			(Note: Vote totals unknown)
25th	**B. V. Summerlin***	4,520	57.06%	C. M. Taylor	3,401	42.94%	—	—	—	7,921	+1,119	+14.13%	
27th	**A. L. Patterson***	3,440	54.20%	Jimmie Putnam	1,572	24.77%	W. A. Dozier	1,335	21.03%	6,347	+1,868	+29.43%	
28th	**Silas D. Cater (inc.)***	7,042	76.11%	Charles B. Teasley	2,211	23.89%	—	—	—	9,253	+4,831	+52.21%	
29th	**T. F. Burnside***	3,344	55.54%	Lonnie G. McPherson	2,677	44.46%	—	—	—	6,021	+667	+11.08%	(Note: DeKalb returns only.)
31st	**Rankin Fite**	4,868	35.38%	**W. B. Mixon**	**4,530**	**32.92%**	R. L. Hill	4,363	31.71%	13,761	+338	+2.46%	
32nd	**James S. Coleman Jr.***	1,242	66.95%	W. P. Breen	613	33.05%	—	—	—	1,855	+629	+33.91%	(Note: Hale returns only. Coleman carried both counties.)
33rd	**Joseph N. Langan**	5,438	48.22%	**Vincent Kilborn (inc.)**	**4,400**	**39.01%**	Alexander Foremen	1,440	12.77%	11,278	+1,038	+9.20%	
34th	**John E. Gaither***	2,544	65.38%	W. H. Howle	1,347	34.62%	—	—	—	3,891	+1,197	+30.76%	(Note: Cleburne and Clay returns only, Gaither carried all three counties.)

=== Nominated without opposition ===
The following candidates automatically won the Democratic nomination, as no opponent filed to run against them:

- District 1: David U. Patton
- District 4: R. J. Lowe
- District 6: James B. Allen
- District 9: Paul J. Hooton
- District 16: C. Mac Golson
- District 17: R. G. Kendall Jr.
- District 18: W. H. Cooper
- District 21: G. R. Swift
- District 23: J. A. Hughes
- District 24: Preston C. Clayton
- District 26: Forrest G. Bridges
- District 30: George P. Quarles
- District 35: W. G. Hardwick

== 1943–1946 special elections ==
=== District 28 (Montgomery) ===
A special election in Senate District 28 (Montgomery County) was made necessary by the resignation of Charles A. Stakely in December 1942 upon his enlistment in the Navy. Twenty-one of the twenty-three members of the Montgomery County Democratic Executive Committee endorsed Silas D. Cater to fill the seat. Cater did not face opposition from any Republican or independent candidate.

1943 Alabama Senate District 28 special general election January 26, 1943
Party	Candidate	Votes	%	±%
Democratic	Silas D. Cater	571	100.00%	N/A
Total votes		571	100.00%	

=== District 30 (Dallas) ===
A special election in Senate District 30 (Dallas County) was made necessary by the resignation of Edgar Poe Russell in January 1943 upon his appointment to the Alabama Department of Corrections by governor Chauncey Sparks. John L. Sherrer was nominated by the county Democratic executive committee unopposed, and did not face opposition from any Republican or independent candidate.

1943 Alabama Senate District 30 special general election March 23, 1943
Party	Candidate	Votes	%	±%
Democratic	John L. Sherrer	394	100.00%	N/A
Total votes		394	100.00%	

=== District 8 (Talladega) ===
A special election in Senate District 3 (Talladega County) was made necessary by the resignation of Kenneth A. Roberts in March 1943 upon his enlistment in the Navy. Richard B. Kelly Jr., who placed third in the regular Democratic primary in 1942, was nominated by the county Democratic executive committee in March 1943, and did not face opposition from any Republican or independent candidate.

1943 Alabama Senate District 8 special Democratic meeting March 20, 1943
Party	Candidate	Votes	%
Democratic	Richard B. Kelly Jr.	15	53.57%
Democratic	C. A. Killough	12	42.86%
Democratic	S. A. Burns	1	3.57%
Total votes		28	100.00%

1943 Alabama Senate District 8 special general election May 11, 1943
Party	Candidate	Votes	%	±%
Democratic	Richard B. Kelly Jr.	371	98.67%	−1.33%
Write-in		5	1.33%	New
Total votes		376	100.00%	

== See also ==
- Category:1946 elections in Alabama
  - 1946 United States Senate special election in Alabama
  - 1946 United States House of Representatives elections in Alabama
  - 1946 Alabama gubernatorial election
- 1946 United States elections
