= 1948 United States presidential election in Alabama =

- November 2, 1948
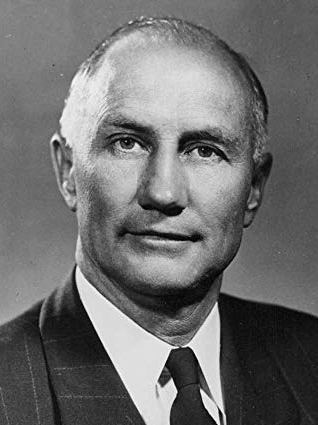

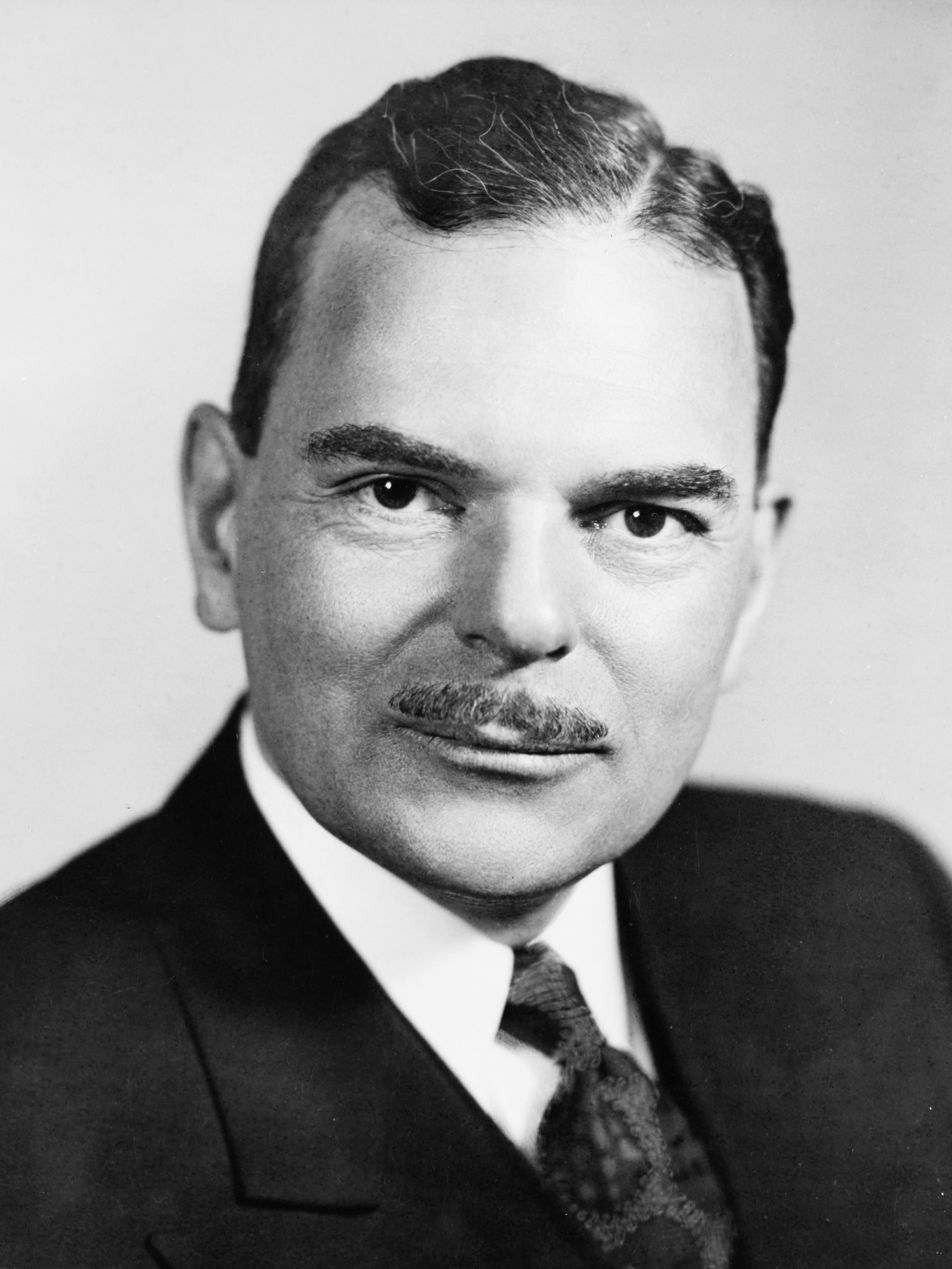
Nominee	Strom Thurmond	Thomas E. Dewey
Party	Democratic	Republican
Alliance	States' Rights Democratic
Home state	South Carolina	New York
Running mate	Fielding L. Wright	Earl Warren
Electoral vote	11	0
Popular vote	171,443	40,930
Percentage	79.75%	19.04%
County results
Thurmond
50–60%
60–70%
70–80%
80–90%
90–100%
Dewey
60–70%
President before election
Harry S. Truman
Democratic
Elected President
Harry S. Truman
Democratic

The 1948 United States presidential election in Alabama was held on November 2, 1948. Alabama voters sent eleven electors to the Electoral College who voted for president and vice-president. In Alabama, voters voted for electors individually instead of (as in most other states) as a slate.

Since the 1890s, Alabama had been effectively a one-party state ruled by the Democratic Party. Disenfranchisement of almost all African-Americans and a large proportion of poor whites via poll taxes, literacy tests and informal harassment had essentially eliminated opposition parties outside of Unionist Winston County and presidential campaigns in a few nearby northern hill counties. The only competitive statewide elections during this period were thus Democratic Party primaries — limited to white voters until the landmark court case of Smith v. Allwright, following which Alabama introduced the Boswell Amendment — ruled unconstitutional in Davis v. Schnell in 1949, although substantial increases in black voter registration would not occur until after the late 1960s Voting Rights Act.

Unlike other Deep South states, soon after black disenfranchisement Alabama's remaining white Republicans made rapid efforts to expel blacks from the state Republican Party, and under Oscar D. Street, who ironically was appointed state party boss as part of the pro-Taft “black and tan” faction in 1912, the state GOP would permanently turn “lily-white”, with the last black delegates at any Republican National Convention serving in 1920. However, with two exceptions the Republicans were unable to gain from their hard lily-white policy. The first was when they exceeded forty percent in the 1920 House of Representatives races for the 4th, 7th and 10th congressional districts, and the second was 1928 presidential election when Senator James Thomas Heflin embarked on a nationwide speaking tour, partially funded by the Ku Klux Klan, against Roman Catholic Democratic nominee Al Smith and supported Republican Herbert Hoover, who went on to lose the state that year by only seven thousand votes.

In 1946 Alabama's one-party Democratic rule was severely challenged not merely by the invalidation of its white primary system, but also by the potential effect on the United States' image abroad (and ability to win the Cold War against the radically egalitarian rhetoric of Communism) from the beating and blinding of Isaac Woodard three hours after being discharged from the army. Truman then attempted to launch a Civil Rights bill, involving desegregation of the military. Southern Democrats immediately made such cries as "unconstitutional", "Communist inspired," "a blow to the loyal South and its traditions," "unwarranted and harmful," "not the answer," and "does irreparable harm to interracial relations".

In May 1948, Alabama's Democratic presidential elector primary chose electors who were pledged to not vote for incumbent President Truman, and the state Supreme Court ruled that any statute requiring party presidential electors to vote for that party's national nominee was void. Half of Alabama's delegation then walked out at the party's national convention in Philadelphia because of Truman's endorsement of civil rights for African Americans. This segregationist faction met on July 17, 1948, in Birmingham, nominating South Carolina governor Strom Thurmond as its nominee for president. Mississippi governor Fielding L. Wright was nominated for vice president.

A "Loyalist" group would petition governor "Big Jim" Folsom to allow Truman electors on the ballot alongside the “Democratic” electors pledged to Thurmond, but Senator John Sparkman, fearing popular defeat at the hands of the Dixiecrats and a hostile state legislature, decided against placing Truman electors on the ballot, although a Gallup poll in October showed that about a third of state voters would support Truman if they were able to do so. (Note: This poll gave Thurmond 43 percent, Dewey 16 percent, Truman 32 percent, and 9 percent for other candidates or undecided. Its results understated actual support for Thurmond in the Deep South by up to 15 percent.) In other Southern states where Truman was on the ballot, (Note: Thurmond was on the ballot in all former Confederate slave states, in the border slave state of Kentucky and the postbellum state of North Dakota, besides receiving a total of 3,769 write-in votes in New Hampshire, New York, Maryland, Missouri and California.) Thurmond was forced to run under the label of the States' Rights Democratic Party.

== Polls ==
Source	Ranking	As of
The Montgomery Advertiser	Certain I (flip)	October 24, 1948
The Miami News	Certain I (flip)	October 25, 1948
The Charlotte Observer	Certain I (flip)	October 27, 1948
Mount Vernon Argus	Certain I (flip)	November 1, 1948
Oakland Tribune	Certain I (flip)	November 1, 1948

== Results ==
1948 United States presidential election in Alabama
Party	Candidate	Votes	Percentage	Electoral votes
Democratic/Dixiecrat	Strom Thurmond	171,443	79.75%	11
Republican	Thomas E. Dewey	40,930	19.04%	0
Progressive	Henry A. Wallace	1,522	0.71%	0
Prohibition	Claude A. Watson	1,085	0.50%	0
Voter turnout (voting age)		12.5%		

=== Results by individual elector ===
General election results
Party	Pledged to	Elector	Votes
Democratic Party	Strom Thurmond	Tom Abernathy	171,443
Democratic Party	Strom Thurmond	Ben Bloodworth	171,336
Democratic Party	Strom Thurmond	Tully A. Goodwin	171,284
Democratic Party	Strom Thurmond	Walter C. Givhan	171,279
Democratic Party	Strom Thurmond	Norman W. Harris	171,272
Democratic Party	Strom Thurmond	John A. Lusk Jr.	171,272
Democratic Party	Strom Thurmond	Robert B. Albritton	171,264
Democratic Party	Strom Thurmond	Gessner T. McCorvey	171,213
Democratic Party	Strom Thurmond	Edmund Blair	171,212
Democratic Party	Strom Thurmond	Walter F. Miller	171,201
Democratic Party	Strom Thurmond	Horace C. Walkinson	170,825
Republican Party	Thomas E. Dewey	O. H. Aycock	40,930
Republican Party	Thomas E. Dewey	J. A. Downer	40,853
Republican Party	Thomas E. Dewey	W. H. Gillespie	40,842
Republican Party	Thomas E. Dewey	V. B. Huff	40,811
Republican Party	Thomas E. Dewey	Walter J. Kennamer	40,811
Republican Party	Thomas E. Dewey	L. A. Carroll	40,774
Progressive Party	Henry A. Wallace	Jesse L. Dansby	1,522
Progressive Party	Henry A. Wallace	Joe M. Goodwin	1,459
Progressive Party	Henry A. Wallace	William A. Upshaw	1,426
Progressive Party	Henry A. Wallace	Robert D. Morgan	1,398
Progressive Party	Henry A. Wallace	Ralph Hopkins	1,394
Progressive Party	Henry A. Wallace	Vivia Thomas	1,385
Progressive Party	Henry A. Wallace	Herbert P. McDonald	1,384
Progressive Party	Henry A. Wallace	Frank R. McGhee	1,381
Progressive Party	Henry A. Wallace	Robert F. Travis Jr.	1,377
Progressive Party	Henry A. Wallace	Allison H. Stanton	1,366
Progressive Party	Henry A. Wallace	Johanna Newhouse	1,363
Prohibition Party	Claude A. Watson	Glenn V. Tingley	1,085
Prohibition Party	Claude A. Watson	Eulalia R. Vess	1,085
Prohibition Party	Claude A. Watson	J. B. Lockhart	1,055
Prohibition Party	Claude A. Watson	Cora McAdory	1,043
Prohibition Party	Claude A. Watson	Jack Moore	1,040
Prohibition Party	Claude A. Watson	L. E. Barton	1,038
Prohibition Party	Claude A. Watson	Elizabeth Lewis	1,036
Prohibition Party	Claude A. Watson	Ethel M. Durham	1,028
Prohibition Party	Claude A. Watson	H. P. Amos	1,026
Prohibition Party	Claude A. Watson	M. E. Poland	1,015
Prohibition Party	Claude A. Watson	Noble M. Israelson	1,001
Total votes			214,980

=== Results by county ===
County	Strom Thurmond Dixiecrat		Thomas E. Dewey Republican		Henry A. Wallace Progressive		Claude A. Watson Prohibition		Margin		Total votes cast
County	#	%	#	%	#	%	#	%	#	%	Total votes cast
Autauga	1,160	90.20%	110	8.55%	2	0.16%	14	1.09%	1,050	81.65%	1,286
Baldwin	2,577	74.80%	767	22.26%	67	1.94%	34	0.99%	1,810	52.54%	3,445
Barbour	1,679	93.90%	101	5.65%	2	0.11%	6	0.34%	1,578	88.25%	1,788
Bibb	1,188	88.46%	123	9.16%	8	0.60%	24	1.79%	1,065	79.30%	1,343
Blount	1,768	68.98%	771	30.08%	2	0.08%	22	0.86%	997	38.90%	2,563
Bullock	799	98.76%	10	1.24%	0	0.00%	0	0.00%	789	97.52%	809
Butler	1,313	93.19%	91	6.46%	2	0.14%	3	0.21%	1,222	86.73%	1,409
Calhoun	3,236	77.40%	856	20.47%	60	1.44%	29	0.69%	2,380	56.93%	4,181
Chambers	1,520	86.02%	218	12.34%	11	0.62%	18	1.02%	1,302	73.68%	1,767
Cherokee	1,055	81.59%	217	16.78%	3	0.23%	18	1.39%	838	64.81%	1,293
Chilton	1,966	55.09%	1,584	44.38%	5	0.14%	14	0.39%	382	10.71%	3,569
Choctaw	1,440	98.83%	16	1.10%	0	0.00%	1	0.07%	1,424	97.73%	1,457
Clarke	2,059	97.58%	47	2.23%	0	0.00%	4	0.19%	2,012	95.35%	2,110
Clay	1,106	73.64%	387	25.77%	2	0.13%	7	0.47%	719	47.87%	1,502
Cleburne	700	68.16%	317	30.87%	7	0.68%	3	0.29%	383	37.29%	1,027
Coffee	2,031	94.38%	113	5.25%	7	0.33%	1	0.05%	1,918	89.13%	2,152
Colbert	2,609	83.49%	488	15.62%	14	0.45%	14	0.45%	2,121	67.87%	3,125
Conecuh	1,339	95.03%	64	4.54%	2	0.14%	4	0.28%	1,275	90.49%	1,409
Coosa	840	74.73%	275	24.47%	3	0.27%	6	0.53%	565	50.26%	1,124
Covington	2,764	94.14%	154	5.25%	6	0.20%	12	0.41%	2,610	88.89%	2,936
Crenshaw	1,386	96.79%	38	2.65%	1	0.07%	7	0.49%	1,348	94.14%	1,432
Cullman	3,587	66.87%	1,755	32.72%	6	0.11%	16	0.30%	1,832	34.15%	5,364
Dale	1,352	84.39%	230	14.36%	7	0.44%	13	0.81%	1,122	70.03%	1,602
Dallas	2,720	94.77%	132	4.60%	9	0.31%	9	0.31%	2,588	90.17%	2,870
DeKalb	3,573	56.42%	2,743	43.31%	7	0.11%	10	0.16%	830	13.11%	6,333
Elmore	2,387	92.88%	167	6.50%	6	0.23%	10	0.39%	2,220	86.38%	2,570
Escambia	1,681	89.32%	188	9.99%	11	0.58%	2	0.11%	1,493	79.33%	1,882
Etowah	5,895	76.95%	1,615	21.08%	107	1.40%	44	0.57%	4,280	55.87%	7,661
Fayette	1,023	63.07%	580	35.76%	7	0.43%	12	0.74%	443	27.31%	1,622
Franklin	3,226	55.68%	2,555	44.10%	5	0.09%	8	0.14%	671	11.58%	5,794
Geneva	1,823	85.87%	286	13.47%	5	0.24%	9	0.42%	1,537	72.40%	2,123
Greene	621	94.66%	31	4.73%	0	0.00%	4	0.61%	590	89.93%	656
Hale	1,041	95.77%	43	3.96%	2	0.18%	1	0.09%	998	91.81%	1,087
Henry	1,040	95.59%	47	4.32%	0	0.00%	1	0.09%	993	91.27%	1,088
Houston	2,715	85.78%	426	13.46%	18	0.57%	6	0.19%	2,289	72.32%	3,165
Jackson	1,726	73.54%	603	25.69%	3	0.13%	15	0.64%	1,123	47.85%	2,347
Jefferson	30,043	79.35%	7,261	19.18%	361	0.95%	196	0.52%	22,782	60.17%	37,861
Lamar	1,434	88.41%	180	11.10%	2	0.12%	6	0.37%	1,254	77.31%	1,622
Lauderdale	3,258	85.24%	546	14.29%	6	0.16%	12	0.31%	2,712	70.95%	3,822
Lawrence	1,436	79.51%	357	19.77%	3	0.17%	10	0.55%	1,079	59.74%	1,806
Lee	1,731	86.25%	258	12.86%	5	0.25%	13	0.65%	1,473	73.39%	2,007
Limestone	1,853	93.49%	112	5.65%	4	0.20%	13	0.66%	1,741	87.84%	1,982
Lowndes	752	94.95%	13	1.64%	25	3.16%	2	0.25%	727 (Note: In this county where Wallace ran second ahead of Dewey, margin given is Thurmond vote minus Wallace vote and percentage margin Thurmond percentage minus Wallace percentage.)	91.79%	792
Macon	1,098	90.67%	110	9.08%	3	0.25%	0	0.00%	988	81.59%	1,211
Madison	2,947	83.58%	466	13.22%	39	1.11%	74	2.10%	2,481	70.36%	3,526
Marengo	1,873	96.40%	67	3.45%	3	0.15%	0	0.00%	1,806	92.95%	1,943
Marion	1,646	66.48%	813	32.84%	4	0.16%	13	0.53%	833	33.64%	2,476
Marshall	2,500	73.81%	870	25.69%	8	0.24%	9	0.27%	1,630	48.12%	3,387
Mobile	10,831	78.29%	2,685	19.41%	257	1.86%	62	0.45%	8,146	58.88%	13,835
Monroe	1,688	97.86%	31	1.80%	2	0.12%	4	0.23%	1,657	96.06%	1,725
Montgomery	6,196	86.01%	802	11.13%	146	2.03%	60	0.83%	5,394	74.88%	7,204
Morgan	3,841	87.65%	512	11.68%	9	0.21%	20	0.46%	3,329	75.97%	4,382
Perry	1,032	95.47%	30	2.78%	5	0.46%	14	1.30%	1,002	92.69%	1,081
Pickens	1,423	93.37%	91	5.97%	5	0.33%	5	0.33%	1,332	87.40%	1,524
Pike	1,741	94.93%	87	4.74%	3	0.16%	3	0.16%	1,654	90.19%	1,834
Randolph	1,249	72.20%	469	27.11%	7	0.40%	5	0.29%	780	45.09%	1,730
Russell	1,666	93.81%	94	5.29%	11	0.62%	5	0.28%	1,572	88.52%	1,776
Shelby	1,903	63.86%	1,063	35.67%	3	0.10%	11	0.37%	840	28.19%	2,980
St. Clair	1,878	66.60%	921	32.66%	8	0.28%	13	0.46%	957	33.94%	2,820
Sumter	1,058	95.06%	52	4.67%	0	0.00%	3	0.27%	1,006	90.39%	1,113
Talladega	3,077	83.05%	593	16.01%	12	0.32%	23	0.62%	2,484	67.04%	3,705
Tallapoosa	2,309	93.33%	156	6.31%	1	0.04%	8	0.32%	2,153	87.02%	2,474
Tuscaloosa	4,697	86.10%	658	12.06%	50	0.92%	50	0.92%	4,039	74.04%	5,455
Walker	4,007	66.47%	1,852	30.72%	133	2.21%	36	0.60%	2,155	35.75%	6,028
Washington	1,304	97.02%	31	2.31%	6	0.45%	3	0.22%	1,273	94.71%	1,344
Wilcox	1,162	98.81%	14	1.19%	0	0.00%	0	0.00%	1,148	97.62%	1,176
Winston	865	35.05%	1,588	64.34%	4	0.16%	11	0.45%	-723	-29.29%	2,468
Totals	171,443	79.75%	40,930	19.04%	1,522	0.71%	1,085	0.50%	130,513	60.71%	214,980

==== Counties that flipped from Democratic to Dixiecrat ====
- Autauga
- Baldwin
- Barbour
- Bibb
- Blount
- Butler
- Calhoun
- Chambers
- Choctaw
- Clarke
- Clay
- Cleburne
- Coffee
- Conecuh
- Coosa
- Covington
- Crenshaw
- Cullman
- Dale
- DeKalb
- Elmore
- Escambia
- Etowah
- Fayette
- Franklin
- Geneva
- Hale
- Henry
- Houston
- Jefferson
- Lee
- Lawrence
- Madison
- Marengo
- Marion
- Marshall
- Monroe
- Morgan
- Mobile
- Montgomery
- Shelby
- Perry
- Pickens
- Pike
- Randolph
- Russell
- St. Clair
- Talladega
- Tallapoosa
- Tuscaloosa
- Walker
- Washington
- Bullock
- Lowndes
- Wilcox
- Greene
- Sumter
- Macon
- Cherokee
- Colbert
- Jackson
- Lauderdale
- Limestone
- Chilton
- Dallas

== Analysis ==
Thurmond overwhelmingly won Alabama by a margin of 60.71 percent, or 130,513 votes, against his closest opponent, Republican New York governor Thomas E. Dewey. This was only a slight decline upon Franklin Roosevelt's performance in Alabama four years previously, and it is known that many Thurmond voters thought incorrectly that they were actually voting for Truman. Two third-party candidates, Henry A. Wallace of the Progressive Party and Claude A. Watson of the Prohibition Party, appeared on the ballot in Alabama, though neither had any impact. This was the first time ever that a Democrat won the presidency without carrying Alabama, and the first time since 1872 that the state failed to vote for the national Democrats.

Thurmond won 84% of white voters.

== See also ==
- United States presidential elections in Alabama

== Works cited ==
- Black, Earl; Black, Merle (1992). The Vital South: How Presidents Are Elected. Harvard University Press. ISBN 0674941306.
