= 1954 Alabama gubernatorial election =

- November 2, 1954
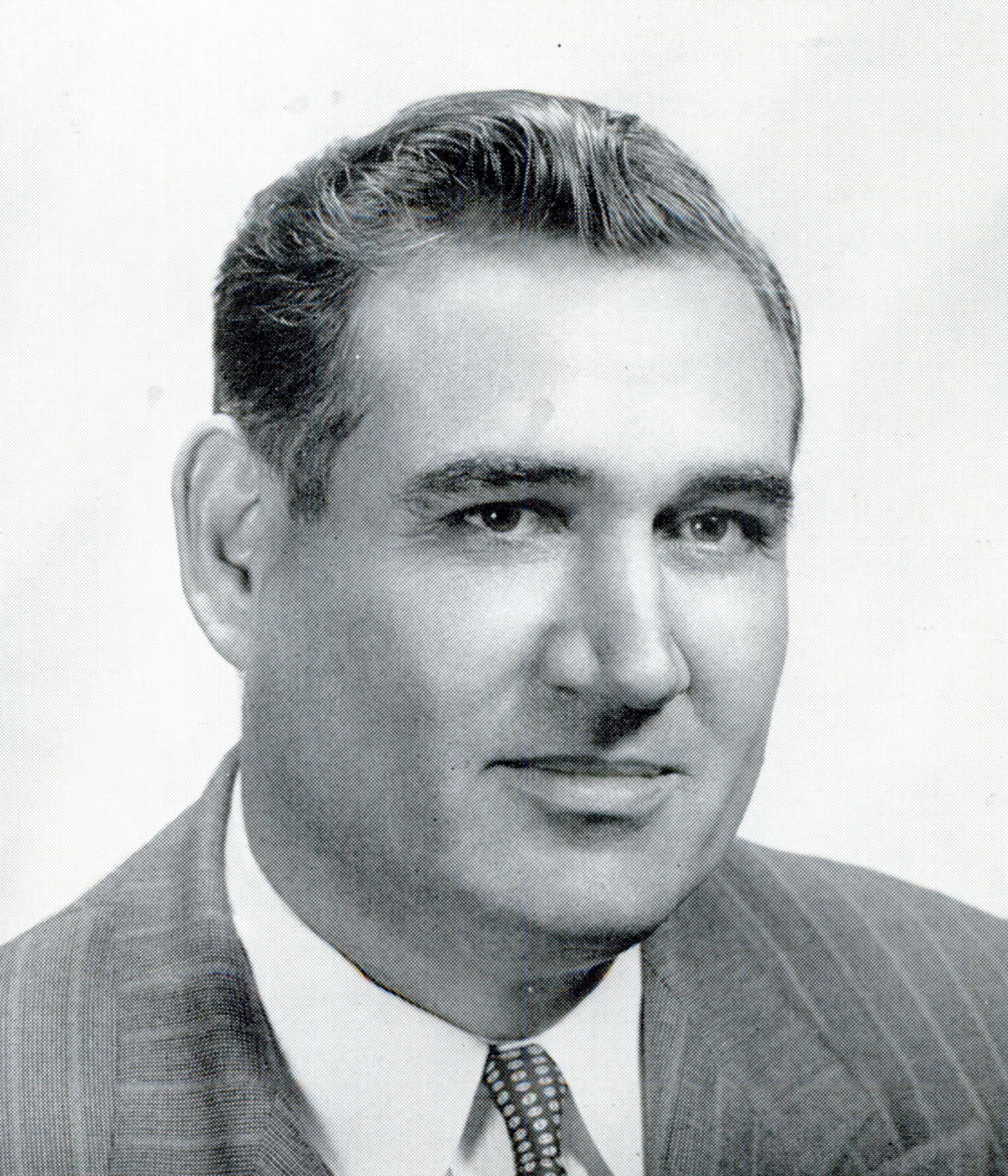

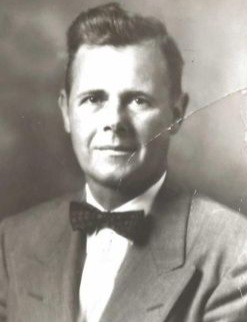
Nominee	Jim Folsom	Tom Abernathy
Party	Democratic	Republican
Popular vote	244,401	88,688
Percentage	73.37%	26.63%
- County results Folsom: 50–60% 60–70% 70–80% 80–90% >90%
Governor before election
Gordon Persons
Democratic
Elected Governor
Jim Folsom
Democratic

The 1954 Alabama gubernatorial election took place on November 2, 1954, to elect the governor of Alabama. Incumbent Democrat Gordon Persons was term-limited, and could not seek a second consecutive term.

== Democratic primary ==
At the time this election took place, Alabama, as with most other southern states, was solidly Democratic, and the Republican Party had such diminished influence that the Democratic primary was the de facto contest for state offices; after winning the Democratic primary it was a given that the nominee would win the general election.

=== Candidates ===
- James Allen, lieutenant governor
- James H. Faulkner, state senator
- Jim Folsom, former governor
- James Gullatte
- J. Bruce Henderson, former state senator and candidate for governor in 1950
- C. C. "Jack" Owen, president of the Public Service Commission
- Henry Sweet

=== Results ===
Results map of the Democratic primary by county. Folsom: 30–40% 40–50% 50–60% 60–70% 70–80% 80–90% Faulkner: 20–30% 30–40% 40–50% 50–60% Allen: 60–70%

1954 Alabama Democratic gubernatorial primary
Party	Candidate	Votes	%
Democratic	Jim Folsom	305,394	51.38
Democratic	James H. Faulkner	151,925	25.56
Democratic	James Allen	61,530	10.35
Democratic	J. Bruce Henderson	47,969	8.07
Democratic	C. C. "Jack" Owen	22,623	3.81
Democratic	Henry Sweet	2,579	0.43
Democratic	James Gullatte	2,371	0.40
Total votes		594,391	100.00

== Results ==
1954 Alabama gubernatorial election
Party	Candidate	Votes	%
Democratic	Jim Folsom	244,401	73.37
Republican	Tom Abernathy	88,688	26.63
Other	Write-ins	1	<0.01
Total votes		333,091	100.00
Democratic hold			
