= 1972 Alabama Democratic presidential primary =

- May 2, 1972

37 Democratic National Convention delegates (29 pledged, 8 unpledged)
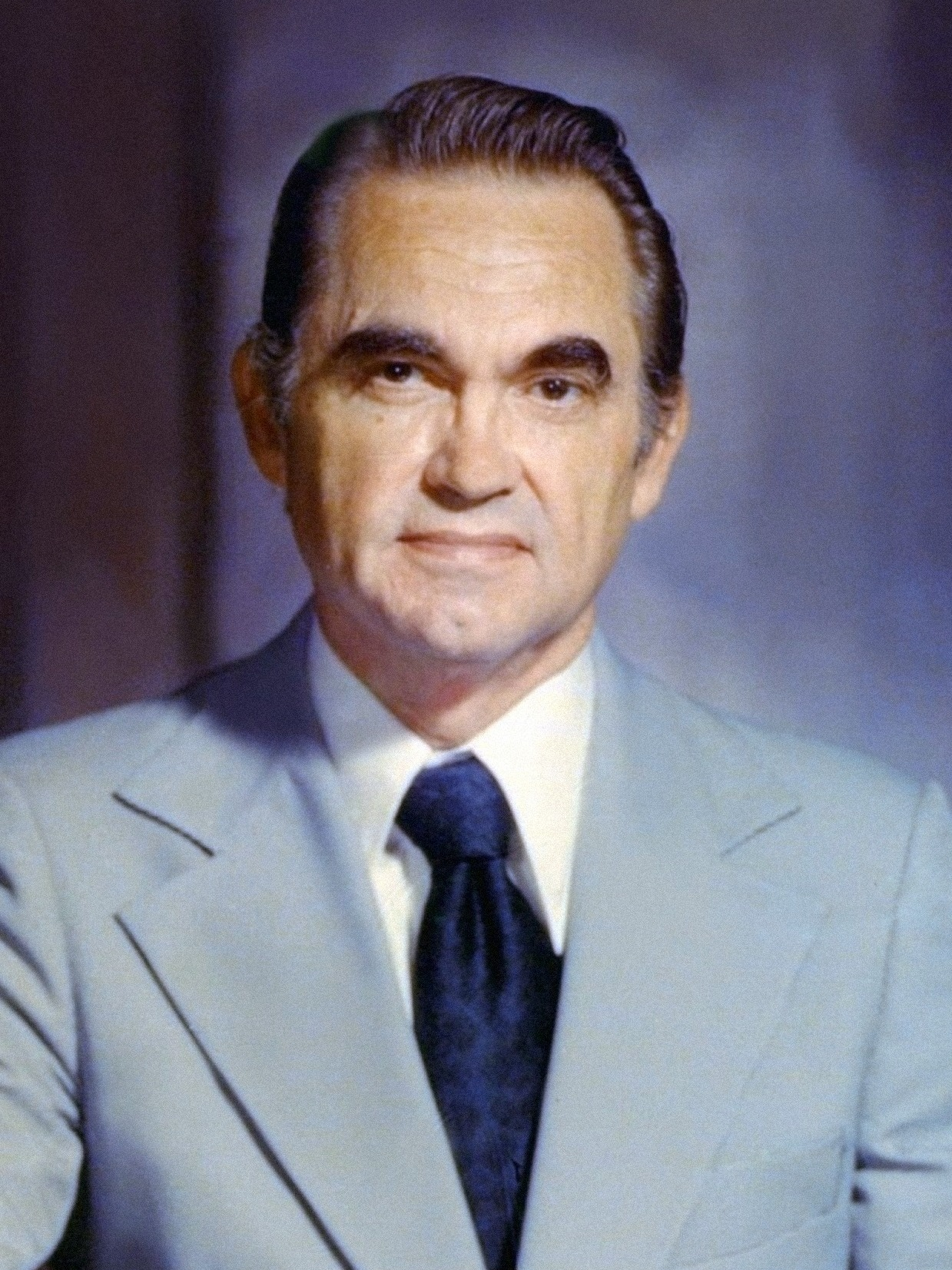

Candidate	George Wallace	Regulars/Loyalists	Uncommitted
Home state	Alabama	—	—
Delegate count	23 DD	6 DD	0
Popular vote	356,822 (Note: Excludes popular vote totals from delegate candidates aligned with but not on Wallace's endorsed slate.)	123,346	79,949
Percentage	61.17%	21.14%	13.70%
Delegate district results
Wallace
50–60%
60–70%
70–80%
80–90%
90–100%
Regulars
50–60%
70–80%
80–90%

A presidential primary was held in the U.S. state of Alabama on May 2, 1972 to elect delegates representing Alabama to the 1972 Democratic National Convention. To elect thirty-five of its thirty-seven pledged delegates, the state was divided into twenty-nine delegate districts based on population and Hubert Humphrey's performance in the state in 1968, which would each nominate a delegate. These twenty-nine delegates would then elect six at-large delegates. Of the twenty-nine delegates elected in May, twenty-three of them were on Wallace's official slate. This victory gave pro-Wallace delegates the ability to determine the six remaining at-large delegates. Six delegates elected from districts and the two ex-officio delegates were considered to be party loyalists. No runoff was needed as all delegates attained more than 50% of votes cast.

At the convention, all twenty-three district delegates pledged to Wallace voted for him, as well as one at-large delegate. Nine delegates, all of whom were Black, voted for nominee George McGovern. Five of the Black McGovern delegates were appointed at-large by the Wallace district delegate majority in order to meet the convention's racial diversity quota, as the Wallace district delegation was entirely White. U.S. Senator Henry M. Jackson of Washington state and former Governor Terry Sanford of Governor of North Carolina received one vote each, and U.S. Representative Wilbur Mills from Arkansas's 2nd received two.

== Results ==
Alabama Democratic presidential primary, 1972
Candidate	Votes	Percentage
George Wallace slate	356,822	61.17%
"Regulars"/"Loyalists"	123,346	21.14%
Other Wallace-aligned	16,816	2.88%
Hubert Humphrey	1,863	0.32%
George McGovern	2,585	0.44%
Henry M. Jackson	1,958	0.34%
Edmund Muskie	22	0.004%
Uncommitted	79,949	13.70%
Total:	583,361	100.00%

=== By delegate district ===
In the "Others" column, (W) denotes delegate candidates pledged to Wallace but not on his official slate, (H) for Hubert Humphrey, (J) for Henry M. Jackson, (McG) for George McGovern, and (M) for Edmund Muskie.

District	George Wallace-endorsed slate			Regulars/Loyalists			Others			Uncommitted			Total
District	Candidate	Votes	%	Candidate	Votes	%	Candidate	Votes	%	Candidate	Votes	%	Total
1st	James L. Hunt	16,806	60.80%	Edward F. Mauldin	4,813	17.41%	—	—	—	Two uncommitted (Note: Murray Beasley: 4,694 votes, 16.98%; Grady E. Sockwell: 1,330 votes, 4.81%)	6,024	21.79%	27,643
2nd	Fred C. Folsom	19,063	66.70%	Don B. Horton	2,422	8.47%	—	—	—	Five uncommitted (Note: Jim Folsom: 2,446 votes, 8.56%; Estus Durham: 1,765 votes, 6.18%; Mike Maurer: 1,159 votes, 4.06%; Avery Thornhill: 1,064 votes, 3.72%; Gerald Colson: 662 votes, 2.32%)	7,096	24.83%	28,581
3rd	Jack Giles	11,323	60.80%	John L. McDaniel	1,915	10.28%	Bill Anderson (W)	783	4.20%	Seven uncommitted (Note: Robert Bell: 875 votes, 4.70%; Joseph Conwell: 780 votes, 4.19%; William A. Brown: 701 votes, 3.76%; Mrs. Joe S. Elliott: 697 votes, 3.74%; Robert T. Schwenn: 692 votes, 3.72%; Mary Shepard Hughes: 603 votes, 3.24%; Grace C. Nixon: 254 votes, 1.36%)	4,602	24.71%	18,623
4th	Bill Williams	13,140	57.02%	Louise Rodgers	2,143	9.30%	Three others (Note: Clayton Carter (W): 4,555 votes, 19.76%; Bob Haas (J): 1,958 votes, 8.50%; Richard E. Cordray (McG): 1,250 votes, 5.42%)	7,763	24.71%	—	—	—	23,046
5th	Robert Hitt	16,474	52.73%	Roy Davis McCord	7,646	24.47%	Virgil M. Smith (W)	3,250	10.40%	Two uncommitted (Note: Howard McCullars: 2,382 votes, 7.62%; Argus Kelley: 1,490 votes, 4.77%)	3,872	12.39%	31,242
6th	James E. Wilson	21,702	69.78%	Bill Fite	4,847	15.59%	—	—	—	Three uncommitted (Note: William T. Adkins: 2,123 votes, 6.83%; Delmer Duboise: 1,726 votes, 5.55%; Alton M. Hambric: 701 votes, 2.25%)	4,550	14.63%	31,099
7th	Hugh Boles	17,285	72.07%	Ralph Reid	3,067	12.79%	—	—	—	Three uncommitted (Note: Bob Dickinson: 1,812 votes, 7.56%; J. C. Gentle: votes, 899 3.75%; Don Watts: 919 votes, 3.83%)	3,630	15.14%	23,982
8th	—	—	—	David H. Hood Jr.	5,487	59.52%	—	—	—	Two uncommitted (Note: Jack Goodwin: 2,536 votes, 27.51%; Henry Varner Jr.: 1,196 votes, 12.97%)	3,732	40.48%	9,219
9th	Frank A. Stacey	6,170	52.00%	Thermon Coggins	803	6.77%	—	—	—	Three uncommitted (Note: Mrs. Bernice C. Johnson: 3,526 votes, 29.72%; James M. Burns: 687 votes, 5.79%; John A. Tortorici: 680 votes, 5.73%)	4,893	41.24%	11,866
10th	—	—	—	Arthur Shores	4,639	72.35%	—	—	—	Three uncommitted (Note: Leon Thomasino: 1,151 votes, 17.95%; Larry Cooper: 622 votes, 9.70%)	1,773	27.65%	6,412
11th	Mrs. Gri Cashio	1,910	29.60%	Robert Smith Vance	3,807	59.00%	Albert Domm (M)	22	0.34%	Marie Stokes Jemison	714	11.06%	6,453
12th	Jess Lanier	8,731	61.09%	Two regulars (Note: Alan T. Drennen Jr.: 3,991 votes, 27.92%; Marge Sparks Fullan: 879 votes, 6.15%)	4,870	34.08%	J. Richard Riddle (H)	244	1.71%	Two uncommitted (Note: Fred L. Goldstein: 301 votes, 2.11%; Marcus W. Lee: 146 votes, 1.02%)	447	3.13%	14,292
13th	P. Graves Musgrove	7,140	59.94%	Don A. Hawkins	4,772	40.06%	—	—	—	—	—	—	11,912
14th	George Wingard	14,281	58.96%	Ray Hartwell	4,398	18.16%	2 others (Note: Dwight L. Evans (W): 2,531 votes, 10.45%; Margaret Stewart (W): 1,736 votes, 7.17%)	4,267	17.62%	Lewis P. Roberts	1,277	5.27%	24,223
15th	J. Groce Pratt	8,183	64.83%	Joseph W. Mallisham	2,810	22.26%	—	—	—	Theodore Caselberry	1,629	12.91%	12,622
16th	James L. Chancy	21,608	67.73%	Jane K. Dishuck	5,249	16.45%	Bill Johnston (W)	1,767	5.54%	Louise Moody Shils	3,281	10.28%	31,905
17th	John B. McKinney	18,315	63.28%	Tom Radney	7,168	24.76%	—	—	—	Hubert Hubbard	3,462	11.96%	28,945
18th	I. Drayton Pruitt	9,820	54.32%	Andrew M. Hayden	7,240	40.05%	—	—	—	John Greene Jr.	1,018	5.63%	18,078
19th	Earl Goodwin	Unopposed		—	—	—	—	—	—	—	—	—	—
20th	—	—	—	Rufus A. Lewis	3,809	51.23%	—	—	—	Ned T. Ellis	3,626	48.77%	7,435
21st	Hilda Smilie	17,487	66.54%	Robert P. Arrington	3,401	12.94%	—	—	—	Four uncommitted (Note: Reggie Hamner: 2,117 votes, 8.06%; Robert H. Carpenter Jr.: 1,533 votes, 5.83%; Eric Anderson: 1,085 votes, 4.13%; Albert Roemer: 657 votes, 2.50%)	5,392	20.52%	26,280
22nd	Billy Brabham	8,356	47.29%	Thomas Reed	9,313	52.71%	—	—	—	—	—	—	17,669
23rd	I. J. Scott	14,143	69.62%	Whit Whittelsey	1,960	9.65%	Two others (Note: Donald P. Foshee (H): 1,619 votes, 7.97%; Richard S. Rush (McG): 1,335 votes, 6.57%)	2,954	14.54%	Emmett L. Fulgham	1,258	6.19%	20,315
24th	Joe McCorquodale III	22,669	68.44%	Two regulars (Note: Broox G. Garrett: 7,517 votes, 22.69%; Wallace Pruitt: 1,370 votes, 4.14%)	8,887	26.83%	—	—	—	Keith Trawick	1,566	4.73%	33,122
25th	Abner Powell	27,377	74.68%	Ed Byrd	4,768	13.01%	—	—	—	Three uncommitted (Note: Tommy Chapman: 1,936 votes, 5.28%; Mary O. Carnley Purvis: 1,047 votes, 2.86%; Larry Grissett: 1,529 votes, 4.17%)	4,512	12.31%	36,657
26th	Mrs. S. A. Cherry	23,090	82.02%	E. Terry Brown	3,986	14.16%	—	—	—	Manning Warren	1,077	3.83%	28,153
27th	L. W. Brannan	17,181	68.83%	Kenneth G. Parker	2,054	8.23%	—	—	—	Two uncommitted (Note: Dan Alexander: 4,385 votes, 17.57%; Wallace M. Johnston: 1,341 votes, 5.37%)	5,726	22.94%	24,961
28th	Clarence Snowden	14,568	62.99%	Patricia G. Edington	2,595	11.22%	William Westbrook (W)	1,681	7.27%	Four uncommitted (Note: Ellis V. Ollinger: 1,994 votes, 8.62%; Edwin Zelnicker Jr.: 1,109 votes, 4.80%; Susan P. Youngblood: 819 votes, 3.54%; Charles Gudac: 361 votes, 1.56%)	4,283	18.52%	23,127
29th	—	—	—	Isom Clemon	4,477	89.79%	—	—	—	S. Eilene McLoughlin	509	10.21%	4,986
Source: The Birmingham News

== See also ==
- 1972 Democratic Party presidential primaries
- 1972 United States presidential election
- 1972 United States presidential election in Alabama
- 1972 United States elections
