= Lyman Ward (clergyman) =

- Universalist minister and principal of the Southern Industrial Institute
- Born: April 17, 1868; Hounsfield, New York; United States of America
- Died: December 17, 1948 (aged 80); Camp Hill, Alabama; United States of America
- Resting place: Lyman Ward Military Academy
- Education: St. Lawrence University
- Occupations: Clergyman, educator
- Political party: Republican
- Spouse: Mary Louise Smith
- Children: Mary Celina Ward

Lyman Ward (April 17, 1868 – December 17, 1948) was a Universalist minister who founded the Southern Industrial Institute and who was nominated by the Alabama Republican Party for Governor of Alabama in 1946.

== Biography ==
Lyman Ward was born at Hounsfield, New York, in Jefferson County. He was born on April 17, 1868, to Lyman Trumball Ward and Freelove Stowell Bates. He was raised in Watertown, New York. He graduated from Watertown High School (New York) in 1888. He graduated with a B.S. from St. Lawrence University in Canton, New York, in divinity studies in 1892. St. Lawrence University conferred him the degree of Doctor of Divinity in 1926. He was ordained as a Universalist minister in 1893, was a circuit rider minister from 1893 to 1894, served as pastor of Sawyer Memorial Universalist Church, N.Y. City, 1895–1897, and was the founder and principal of the Southern Industrial Institute, Camp Hill, Alabama. He served as the president of its board of trustees. He was a member of Beta Theta Pi and several scientific and philanthropic organizations, Mason, Knights of Pythias and a contributor on educational and economic problems of the south. In 1897, he was among the clergy with Rev. Charles H. Eaton, D.D. who dedicated the cornerstone for the Universalist Church of the Divine Paternity in Central Park, the only remaining Universalist church in Manhattan, New York. In 1898, Lyman Ward married Mary Louise Smith.

== The Southern Industrial Institute ==
The Wards moved to rural Alabama to perform Universalist mission work at the First Universalist Church of Camp Hill. The Southern Industrial Institute was opened in 1898 as a direct result of efforts by the members of The First Universalist Church. The church enticed Ward from New York for the express purpose of founding a school for children in rural Alabama. Lyman Ward served the school as headmaster and the Universalist church as pastor. The school was located in the village of Camp Hill, Alabama, about 20 miles from Auburn, Alabama. The original purpose of the school was to provide secondary education in agricultural and vocational arts. The Southern Industrial Institute was founded at Camp Hill, Alabama on September 21, 1898. The school was a non-profit, non-denominational, co-educational institution for rural white youth.

In February 1901, the Legislature of Alabama regularly incorporated the school as The Southern Industrial Institute, Inc. by special act. The bill was introduced by Thomas L. Bulger, of Dadeville, Alabama. In Russell E. Miller's history of the Universalist Church, The Larger Hope: The Second Century of the Universalist Church in America, 1870-1970, he writes extensively about Ward and the educational endeavors of the Southern Industrial Institute. The board introduced a two-track curriculum for literary and manual/industrial, divided into elementary and secondary. In 1904-1905, there were twenty-six students in the elementary level of the literary curriculum (twelve boys and fourteen girls) and a total of forty-four at the secondary level. Thirty-two pupils were enrolled in the manual/industrial division. Expenditures that year were reported $3,600.

Ward continued to receive support from Universalist organizations and to solicit assistance. In 1905 he received a grant of $70 (~$2,508 in 2025) from the Women's National Missionary Association for a scholarship. He announced a drive in 1907 for $20,000 which the same group contributed $100. Prospects for the school brightened considerably when it became a state-approved school in 1911 and was hence eligible for several thousand dollars of public aid. In 1914, a four-year assistance grant of $3,000 annually gave much promise, but there were insufficient funds in the state treasury to pay it when due; the school, therefore, accumulated a deficit but was still able to maintain itself by rigorous economies and the continued receipt of donations from various sources. By 1920 the enrollment was nearly 140 and the school, together with the local church, continued to be a center of Universalist influence out of proportion to the size of either the town or the church; the latter remained the largest in the denomination in the entire South.

Ward supported the school with donations from philanthropists and businesses around the United States. He published The Industrial Student which catalogued the achievements of the student body and the institution from year to year.

The children of several Universalist clergies, including Ward's daughter Mary, attended the school. A. G. Strain, a minister who spent his entire life in his native South, sent two of his children to the Institute. In 1930, the cornerstone was laid by Governor Bibb Graves for a new administration building financed by the state in recognition of the great service rendered by the school. The physical plant was simultaneously being expanded by the construction of a new gymnasium financed by alumni donations.

By 1942, Ward retired from administration of the Southern Industrial Institute. He was succeeded by an alumnus of the Southern Industrial Institute, Joseph Brackin Kirkland.

== Universalist education in the South ==
Miller devoted a significant portion of his research to Ward's pragmatic relationship with evangelical minister and educator Quillen Hamilton Shinn in the formation of a Universalist Industrial Institute for the purpose of theological training in the South and the school's subsequent transformation into a non-denominational institution. The school was intended, as the first catalogue described it, "to fit young men and women for the work of life, whether in manual training or in literature and art," and there was to be no infringement on either the religious or political liberties of the students. It was further intended that "a theological department shall always be maintained for the training of young men for the work of the Universalist ministry." The school was established specifically for poor and needy whites; Shinn felt strongly that it should be a model of "rational charity" in the best and literal sense. The first official act which resulted in the establishment of the school was taken early in 1898 at the meeting of the Alabama Conference held in Friendship Church near the community of Waverly. The Conference voted at Ward's urging that an industrial school be at once located in the South. Until the question of a permanent location could be settled, it was decided that the town of Camp Hill, where Ward was then preaching, would be the best temporary location. However, Miller writes that Mary Louise Smith is credited with urging Ward to remain in Camp Hill and it was she who was at least partially responsible for the permanent location of the Southern Industrial Institute in Camp Hill.

In order to attract more students from families suspicious of Universalists and to obtain greater support, several of the trustees, including Ward, set out to make the school completely undenominational. Shinn adamantly opposed such a decision and was supported by a minority of trustees. The majority voted in 1901 to sever any official connection the school might have with the denomination. Although the school was supported by a variety of Universalist individuals and organizations, establishment was never officially authorized by the church. In fact, trustees of the General Convention refused to endorse it on the practical ground that other financial commitments and the limitation of funds made it impossible. The institution was very much the personal concern of Ward and Shinn, and all appeals for denominational support came ultimately from them. Charles Howe's biography of Quillen Shinn does not acknowledge the controversial relationship between Ward and Shinn although acknowledging reference to Miller's The Larger Hope.

== Segregation in industrial education ==
Ward and his school's work were contemporaneous with that of the Tuskegee Institute at Tuskegee, Alabama. Ward and Booker T. Washington shared correspondence regarding agricultural research and achievements of their respective institutions. Miller wrote that "Ward, enthusiastic about the work on which he had embarked, attended the sessions of the annual Tuskegee Negro Conference in 1900 to learn how other industrial schools operated. He was warmly received, and was described by one of the trustees of Tuskegee as "a white Booker T. Washington." Ward was a lifelong admirer of Washington and his work. Ward also held in 1900 what was announced as the first of a series of annual educational conferences on the advantages of industrial education, urging public schools to add trade courses to their basically classical curricula. In 1914, during the administration of Governor Emmet O'Neal, Ward became a member of the Southern Sociological Congress. Upon the death of Washington in 1915, Ward penned an elegiac obituary in the Christian Register, "The Funeral of Booker T. Washington," in which he wrote that, "Booker Washington lives in the lives of thousands whom he has taught to eradicate hatred and narrowness and meanness. Booker Washington lives on in the hearts, not of only those who know the English tongue, but in the lives of those who do not know our language or its meaning. Booker Washington lives as Christ lives. Booker Washington is alive as Paul is yet alive."

== Nominee for Governor of Alabama ==
In 1946, Ward was the Republican nominee for the Governor of Alabama. He was defeated by his Democratic opponent, James Elisha Folsom. Folsom obtained 174,962 (88.67%) votes and Ward obtained 22,362 (11.33%) votes.

== Awards and posthumous honors ==
Ward was awarded the honorary degree of Doctor of Divinity in 1926 by St. Lawrence University for his achievements in education.

Ward died on December 17, 1948, at Camp Hill. A tribute to Ward was paid by Dr. John Murray Atwood, dean of the Theological School at St. Lawrence University. Following his death, the board of directors of the Southern Industrial Institute established a military department and the school then changed its name to Lyman Ward Military Academy in honor of its founder. At this time, the school also ended its elementary and co-educational programs. The school was the subject of Jerri Beck's book, Their Country's Pride: The Centennial History of Lyman Ward Military Academy: 1898–1998.

Ward was survived by a daughter, Mary Celina Ward Rose.

Party political offices
Preceded by Hugh McEniry	Republican nominee for Governor of Alabama; 1946	Succeeded by John S. Crowder
