= 1946 Alabama elections =

Elections in the U.S. state of Alabama in 1946

A general election was held in the U.S. state of Alabama on November 5, 1946. Primary elections were held on May 7, 1946, and primary runoffs were held on June 4, 1946.

== State offices ==
=== Governor ===
Jim Folsom was elected.

=== Lieutenant governor ===
James C. Inzer was elected.

=== Attorney General ===
Albert A. Carmichael was elected.

=== Secretary of State ===
Sibyl Pool was elected.

=== State Treasurer ===
John Brandon was elected.

=== State Auditor ===
Dan Thomas was elected.

=== Commissioner of Agriculture ===
Haygood Paterson was elected.

=== Superintendent of Education ===
A. R. Meadows was elected.

=== Public Service Commission ===
Jimmy Hitchcock and Jack Owen were elected.

=== State legislative ===
==== House of Representatives ====
The Alabama Democratic Party retained control of the Alabama House of Representatives.

==== Senate ====
The Alabama Democratic Party retained control of the Alabama Senate.

== Referendums ==
Nine constitutional amendments were voted on by the Alabama electorate on November 5, 1946.

- Amendment 4 (Dubbed the "Boswell Amendment")
