= Sawyer Memorial Universalist Church =

Historic church in Harlem, New York City

Coordinates: 40.80570°N 73.93641°W

- Location: 121 East 127th Street at Lexington Avenue, New York City, United States

Architecture
- Years built: 1879

Sawyer Memorial Universalist Church was a historic church in Harlem, New York.

The Second Universalist Society was organized early in the 19th century, and in 1832 acquired the Reformed Dutch Church at 97 Orchard Street. This church was torn down three decades later, and the society was in Oliver Street for a few years. Following the Civil War, the congregation moved in 1869 to Harlem where they met in a building on East 127th Street at the corner of Lexington Avenue. A new stone church was erected in 1879. At some point, the society merged or disbanded, and in 1889 the property became the Swedish Mission Chapel of St. Bartholomew's Episcopal Church.
