= 1944 United States Senate election in Alabama =

- November 7, 1944
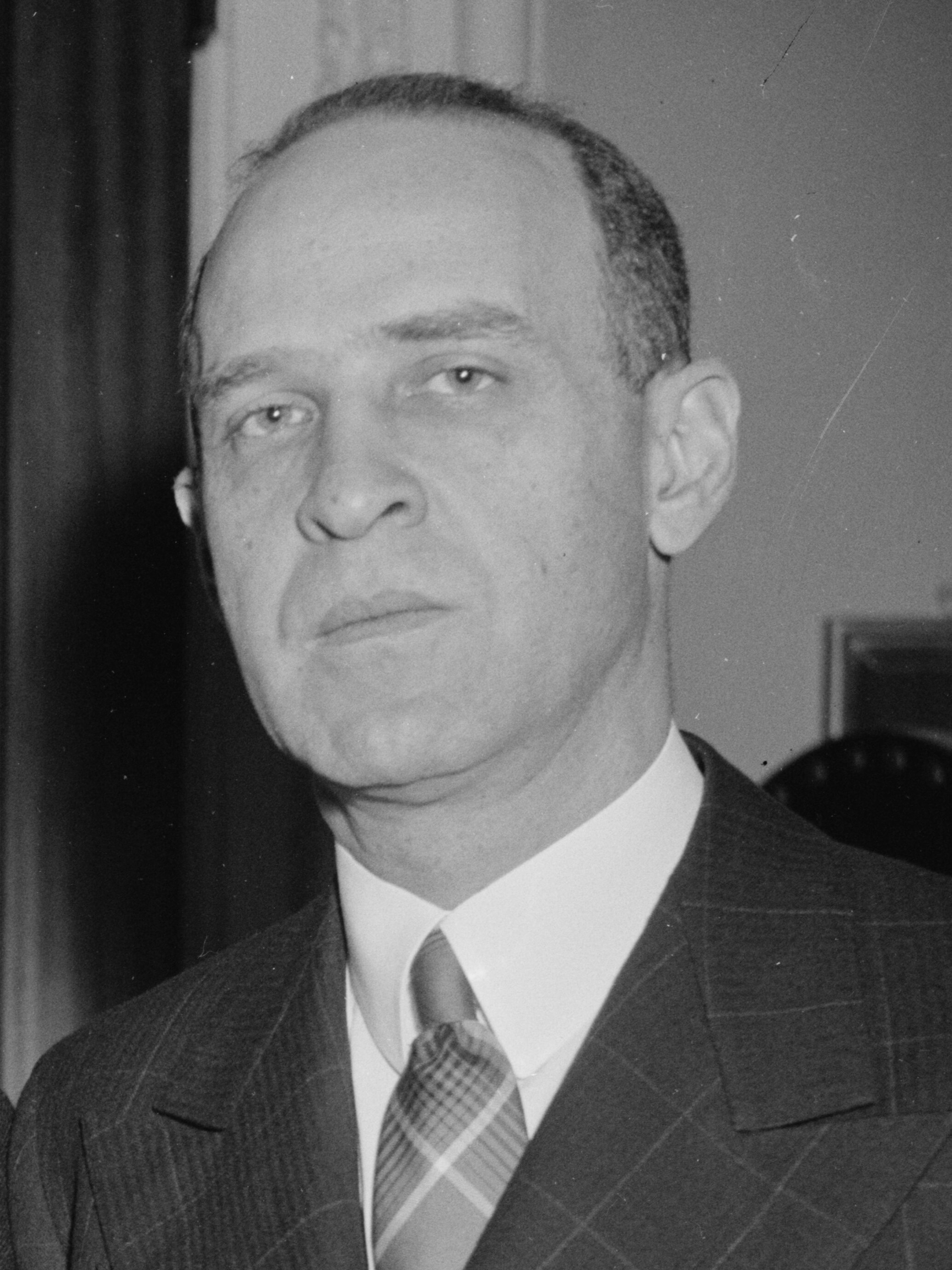

Nominee	J. Lister Hill	John A. Posey
Party	Democratic	Republican
Popular vote	202,604	41,983
Percentage	81.78%	16.95%
- County results Hill: 50–60% 60–70% 70–80% 80–90% 90–100% Posey: 60–70%
U.S. senator before election
J. Lister Hill
Democratic
Elected U.S. Senator
J. Lister Hill
Democratic

The United States Senate election in Alabama of 1944 was held on November 7, 1944.

Incumbent Senator J. Lister Hill was re-elected to a second term in office, defeating Republican John A. Posey.

== Background ==
In 1938, Lister Hill defeated former Senator Thomas Heflin to win the Senate seat vacated by Hugo Black. Like Black, Hill was a supporter of President Franklin D. Roosevelt and the New Deal programs, while Heflin had been supported by the "Big Mule" coalition of Birmingham industrialist and Black Belt planters. In opposition to the New Deal, the Big Mules backed a faction of the Democratic Party headed by Birmingham state senator and corporate lawyer James A. Simpson, who had strong antiunion and anti-New Deal sentiments and family connections to the Woodward Iron Company. Many supporters of Roosevelt and the New Deal in the state, led by Horace C. Wilkinson, Black and former Governor Bibb Graves, had strong ties to the Ku Klux Klan, but Hill was not among them.

== Democratic primary ==
=== Candidates ===
- J. Lister Hill, incumbent Senator since 1938
- James Simpson, State Senator from Birmingham

=== Campaign ===
The 1944 Democratic primary between incumbent Lister Hill and challenger James Simpson was sharply divided on class and racial issues, with Hill generally considered a relatively liberal Southerner for the time.

Simpson's campaign was backed by major industrial interests, while Hill had the support of the Congress of Industrial Organizations political action committee and attacked Simpson as a "high-priced corporation lawyer" and "a vest pocket edition of Wall Street".

During the campaign, Simpson attacked Hill, utilizing racial divisions "solidly interwound with the most hallowed dogmas of the free market." In March, the conservative and pro-business Alabama magazine featured photographs of First Lady Eleanor Roosevelt fraternizing with blacks, an implicit suggestion of the consequences of Hill's liberalism. According to historian Glenn Feldman, the result was a prolonged and ugly campaign. Hill, who had not planned to return to Alabama for the campaign, was forced to return to the state and engage in race baiting to win the election. After 1944, Hill voted consistently against civil rights legislation in the Senate, though he remained loyal to the cause of organized labor.

Both candidates made a statewide radio address on May 1, the eve of the election.

=== Results ===
1944 U.S. Senate election in Alabama, Democratic primary
Party	Candidate	Votes	%
Democratic	J. Lister Hill (Incumbent)	126,372	55.54%
Democratic	James Simpson	101,176	44.46%
Total votes		227,548	100.00%

== General election ==
=== Candidates ===
- J. Lister Hill, incumbent Senator since 1938 (Democratic)
- Hollis B. Parrish (Prohibition)
- John A. Posey (Republican)

=== Results ===
1944 U.S. Senate election in Alabama
Party	Candidate	Votes	%	±%
Democratic	J. Lister Hill (Incumbent)	202,604	81.78%	
Republican	John A. Posey	41,983	16.95%	
Prohibition	Hollis B. Parrish	3,162	1.28%	
Turnout		247,749		
Democratic hold				
