= Chauncey Sparks =

American politician and lawyer (1884–1968)

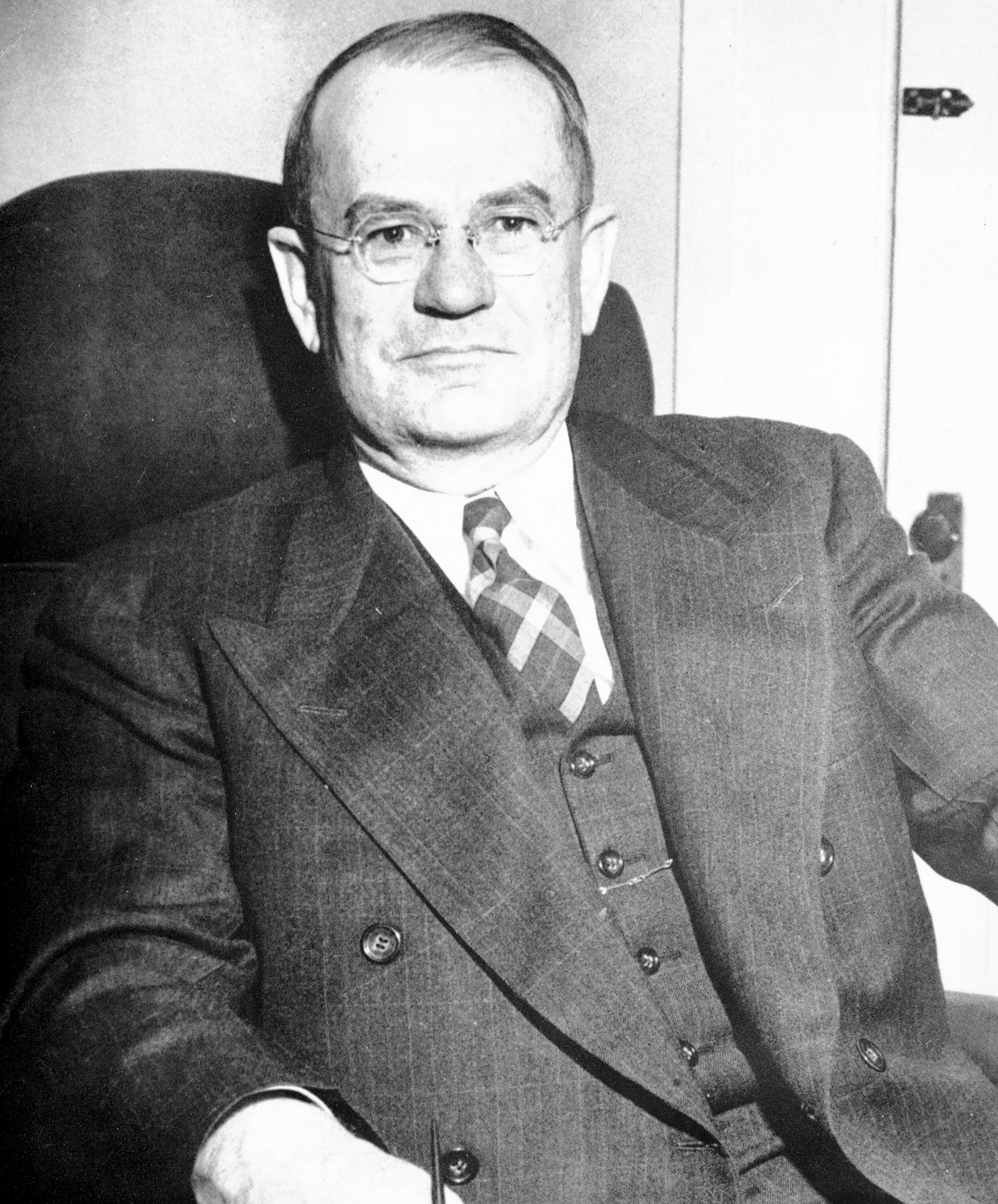
- Official portrait, 1943

41st Governor of Alabama
- In office January 19, 1943 – January 20, 1947
- Lieutenant: Leven H. Ellis
- Preceded by: Frank M. Dixon
- Succeeded by: James E. Folsom

Member of the Alabama House of Representatives from Barbour County
- In office 1931–1939 Serving with F. D. Pierce (1931‍–‍1935); C. E. Whigham (1935‍–‍1939)
- Preceded by: W. H. Owens
- Succeeded by: Charles L. Weston
- In office 1919–1923 Serving with J. D. Clayton
- Preceded by: Henry G. Stringfellow
- Succeeded by: Julius C. Cato Jr.

Personal details
- Born: George Chauncey Sparks; October 8, 1884 Barbour County, Alabama, U.S.
- Died: November 6, 1968 (aged 84) Eufaula, Alabama, U.S.
- Resting place: Fairview Cemetery, Eufaula, Alabama, U.S.
- Party: Democratic

George Chauncey Sparks (October 8, 1884 – November 6, 1968), known as Chauncey Sparks, was an attorney and Democratic American politician who served as the 41st governor of Alabama from 1943 to 1947. He improved the state education of whites and expanded the state schools and centers for agriculture. He campaigned for passage of the Boswell Amendment to the state constitution, which was designed to keep blacks disfranchised following the US Supreme Court ruling Smith v. Allwright (1944) against the use of white primaries by the Democratic Party in the states.

Under the state constitution, Alabama governors could not serve consecutive terms at the time, so Sparks left office without seeking reelection. In 1950, Sparks ran unsuccessfully for reelection as governor. He was the only lifelong bachelor to serve as Alabama governor in the 20th century.

== Life and career ==
Chauncey Sparks was born in Barbour County, Alabama, the son of George Washington and Sarah E. (Castello) Sparks. After his father's death when Chauncey was two years old, the family moved to Quitman County, Georgia where his mother's people lived. He attended school and helped with the family farm. Sparks graduated from Mercer University in Macon, Georgia in 1907 with a Bachelor of Arts degree and received his law degree in 1910.

He wanted to return to Alabama and passed the State Bar exam that year, opening a law practice in Eufaula soon afterward. It was the commercial center of Barbour County, which still had prosperous, extensive white-owned plantations and a majority-black population. Most blacks had been disfranchised since 1901, when the state passed a new constitution containing voter registration requirements such as poll taxes, literacy tests, and grandfather clauses, resulting in the virtual exclusion of blacks from the political system until after passage of federal legislation in the mid-1960s to enforce their constitutional rights as citizens. Tens of thousands of poor whites were also excluded at the time and over the following decades. In the first half of the 20th century, Alabama was effectively a one-party state controlled by white Democrats.

In 1911, Sparks was appointed judge of the inferior court of Barbour County by Democratic Governor Emmet O'Neal, a position he held until 1915. He was a representative in the Alabama Legislature from 1919 to 1923 and 1931–1939. A prominent Democrat, Sparks served as secretary of the Barbour County Democratic Executive Committee from 1914 to 1918. He also served as a member of the board of trustees of the Department of Archives and History, representing the 3rd Congressional District.

Sparks' first bid for governor of Alabama was in 1938, and he was defeated by Frank M. Dixon.

== Governor ==
In 1942, Sparks defeated James E. Folsom and Chris Sherlock to win the governor's seat. Prior to his term as governor, Sparks had an unprogressive legislative record, but by the time he campaigned for the position of governor he renounced his previous record and during his time as governor advocated various improvements in areas like health, welfare education, agriculture and labor rights. In regards to the latter, Sparks advocated legislation aimed at providing minimum wages and maximum hours for unprotected workers.

During his administration, Sparks had to contend with the effects of a wartime economy and the dismantling of war-geared programs after World War II. The massive industrial growth in Alabama during the war resulted in numerous labor problems, making it necessary to re-establish the state Labor Department.

Sparks achieved noteworthy educational gains by doubling state appropriations and lengthening the seven-month school term to eight months. Nevertheless, the system was segregated, and black education was typically underfunded by the state legislature, as were other black facilities.

Under his administration, the University of Alabama School of Medicine (now The University of Alabama at Birmingham) was established in Birmingham, which had become a major industrial city; and a school of forestry was opened at Alabama Polytechnic Institute (now Auburn University). Due to his agricultural background, Sparks was interested in aiding the state's agricultural programs. This included increased appropriations and the establishment of several new farm experiment stations under the auspices of Alabama Polytechnic Institute's Agricultural College.

During Sparks' administration, a constitutional amendment was passed requiring the state legislature to convene every two years instead of every four years. The legislature continued to be dominated by rural counties and was not reapportioned to acknowledge changes in the state and movement of population to urban centers until the mid-century. One of Sparks' most significant achievements was his success in reducing state debt by 25 percent.

== Race relations ==
Sparks was an outspoken opponent of what he terms as "federal encroachments" on what he perceived as states rights issues, especially regarding race relations. Alabama, like other Southern states, had established legal racial segregation in the late 19th and early 20th centuries; it excluded blacks from voting by a variety of devices and had Jim Crow as the custom.

During his campaign, Sparks pledged to "keep the federal government's nose out of Alabama business." He believed in "absolute segregation" and said the Alabama Democratic Party should "do everything necessary to maintain an all-white party."

During his administration, Alabama voters approved the Boswell Amendment, which reduced the already limited franchise of black people in the state. Sparks had campaigned heavily for the amendment, saying it was needed to prevent "a flood of Negroes" from registering to vote as a result of the recent US Supreme Court ruling Smith v. Allwright (1944) that determined white primaries were unconstitutional, as used in Alabama and some other states to restrict access to Democratic Party primaries, which were the only competitive political contests left.

In response to nationwide protests over the kidnapping and gang rape of Recy Taylor, an African American woman from Abbeville, Sparks "reluctantly agreed to launch an investigation" to keep the Federal government from becoming involved. The six white men who raped Taylor admitted to authorities what they had done, but two all-white grand juries subsequently declined to indict them. (As most blacks could not vote, they were excluded from juries.)

In 2011, the Alabama House of Representatives apologized to Taylor on behalf of the state "for its failure to prosecute her attackers" and bring them to justice.

== Later life ==
Unable to succeed himself in office, Sparks left the governor's seat in 1947, replaced by Democrat Jim Folsom. He attempted to return to office in the 1950 election, but lost in the primary to Democrat Gordon Persons. Sparks devoted the rest of his life to his private law practice in Eufaula. A lifelong bachelor, he died there on November 6, 1968.

== Legacy and honors ==
- The Gov. Chauncey Sparks House in Eufala was listed in 1972 on the National Register of Historic Places.

- Gov. Chauncy Sparks House
- U.S. National Register of Historic Places
- Location within Alabama
- Location: 257 Broad St., Eufaula, Alabama
- Coordinates: 31°53′40″N 85°8′45″W
- Area: less than one acre
- Built: 1857
- Architect: Whipple, W.C.
- Architectural style: Greek Revival
- NRHP reference No.: 72000157
- Added to NRHP: June 28, 1972

Party political offices
Preceded by Frank M. Dixon	Democratic nominee for Governor of Alabama; 1942	Succeeded by Jim Folsom
Political offices
Preceded by Frank M. Dixon	Governor of Alabama; 1943–1947	Succeeded by James E. Folsom, Sr.
