= 1946 Alabama gubernatorial election =

- November 5, 1946
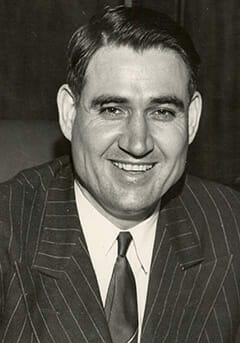

| Nominee | Jim Folsom | Lyman Ward |
| Party | Democratic | Republican |
| Popular vote | 174,962 | 22,362 |
| Percentage | 88.67% | 11.33% |
- County results Folsom: 50–60% 60–70% 70–80% 80–90% >90%
Governor before election
Chauncey Sparks
Democratic
Elected Governor
Jim Folsom
Democratic

The 1946 Alabama gubernatorial election took place on November 5, 1946, to elect the governor of Alabama. Incumbent Democrat Chauncey Sparks was term-limited, and could not seek a second consecutive term.

== Democratic primary ==
At the time this election took place, Alabama, like most other southern states, was solidly Democratic, and the Republican Party had such diminished influence that the Democratic primary was the de facto contest for state offices.

=== Candidates ===
- Elbert Boozer, Calhoun County probate judge
- Leven H. Ellis, lieutenant governor
- Jim Folsom, businessman and candidate for governor in 1942
- Gordon Persons, president of the Public Service Commission
- Joe N. Poole, commissioner of agriculture and industries

=== Results ===
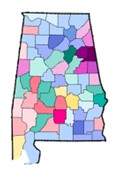
Results by county: Folsom: 20–30%; 30–40%; 40–50%; 50–60%; 60–70%; Ellis: 20–30%; 30–40%; 40–50%; 50–60%; 70–80%; Poole: 20–30%; 30–40%; 40–50%; 60–70%; Boozer: 20–30%; 30–40%; 40–50%; 50–60%; 70–80%; 80–90%; Persons: 20–30%; 30–40%

1946 Alabama Democratic gubernatorial primary
| Party | Candidate | Votes | % |
|---|---|---|---|
| Democratic | Jim Folsom | 103,174 | 28.46 |
| Democratic | Leven H. Ellis | 88,459 | 24.40 |
| Democratic | Joe N. Poole | 70,925 | 19.56 |
| Democratic | Elbert Boozer | 58,134 | 16.04 |
| Democratic | Gordon Persons | 41,851 | 11.54 |
| Total votes | | 362,543 | 100.00 |

=== Runoff ===
As no candidate received a majority of votes, a runoff election was held.

1946 Alabama Democratic gubernatorial primary runoff
| Party | Candidate | Votes | % |
|---|---|---|---|
| Democratic | Jim Folsom | 205,168 | 58.74 |
| Democratic | Leven H. Ellis | 144,126 | 41.26 |
| Total votes | | 349,294 | 100.00 |

== Results ==
1946 Alabama gubernatorial election
| Party | Candidate | Votes | % |
|---|---|---|---|
| Democratic | Jim Folsom | 174,962 | 88.67 |
| Republican | Lyman Ward | 22,362 | 11.33 |
| Total votes | | 197,324 | 100.00 |
| Democratic hold | | | |
