= 1946 United States Senate special election in Alabama =

1946 United States Senate special primary election in Alabama
- June 12, 1946
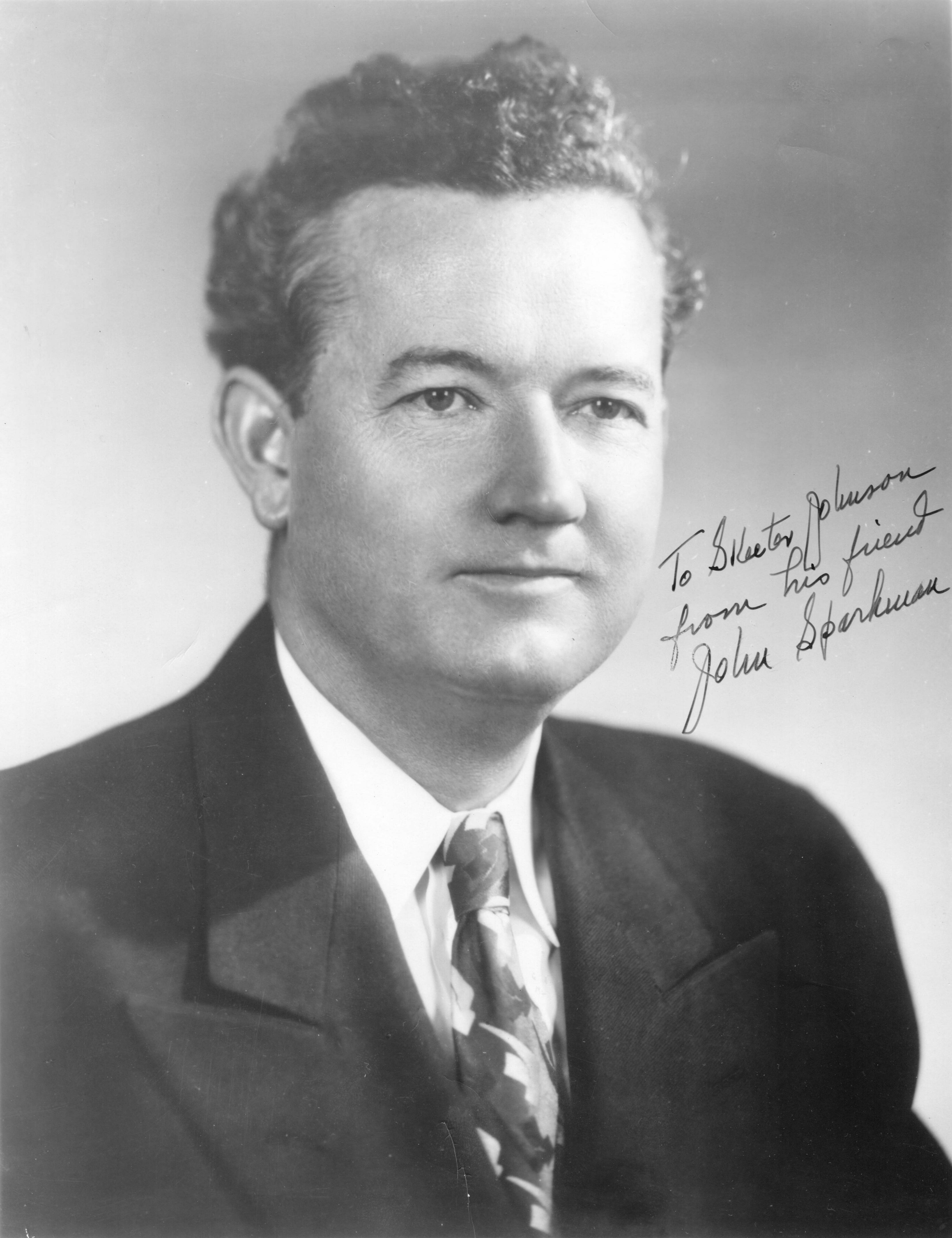

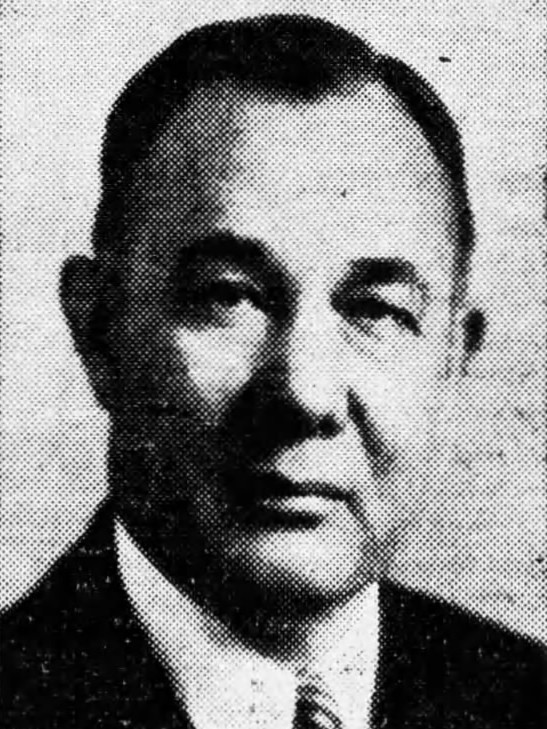

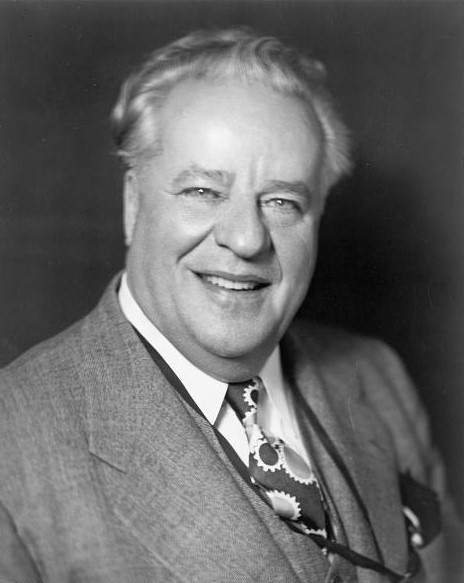
Nominee	John Sparkman	James A. Simpson	Frank W. Boykin
Party	Democratic	Democratic	Democratic
Popular vote	85,049	46,762	35,982
Percentage	50.14%	27.57%	21.21%
- County results Sparkman: 40–50% 50–60% 60–70% 70–80% 80–90% >90% Simpson: 30–40% 40–50% 50–60% Boykin: 50–60% 60–70% 70–80% 80–90% Allen: 30–40%
U.S. senator before election
George R. Swift
Democratic
Elected U.S. Senator
John Sparkman
Democratic

The 1946 United States Senate special election in Alabama was held on November 5, 1946. Primary elections were held on July 30, 1946.

Incumbent Senator John Bankhead died on June 12, 1946. The Democrats were unopposed, thus making the Democratic primary tantamount to the election. Democratic congressman John Sparkman won the primary with 50.14% of the vote.

== Democratic primary ==
=== Candidates ===
- Frank W. Boykin, U.S. Representative from Mobile
- James A. Simpson, State Senator from Birmingham and candidate for Senate in 1944
- Ted Allen
- Thomas H. Maxwell
- John Sparkman, U.S. Representative from Huntsville

=== Results ===
1946 Democratic U.S. Senate primary
Party	Candidate	Votes	%
Democratic	John Sparkman	85,049	50.14%
Democratic	James A. Simpson	46,762	27.57%
Democratic	Frank W. Boykin	35,982	21.21%
Democratic	Ted Allen	1,260	0.74%
Democratic	Thomas H. Maxwell	585	0.35%
Total votes		169,638	100.00%

== General election ==
=== Candidates ===
- John Sparkman, Representative of Alabama's 8th congressional district

=== Results ===
1946 United States Senate special election in Alabama
Party	Candidate	Votes	%
Democratic	John Sparkman	163,217	100.00%
Democratic hold			
