= Jim Folsom =

American politician (1908–1987)

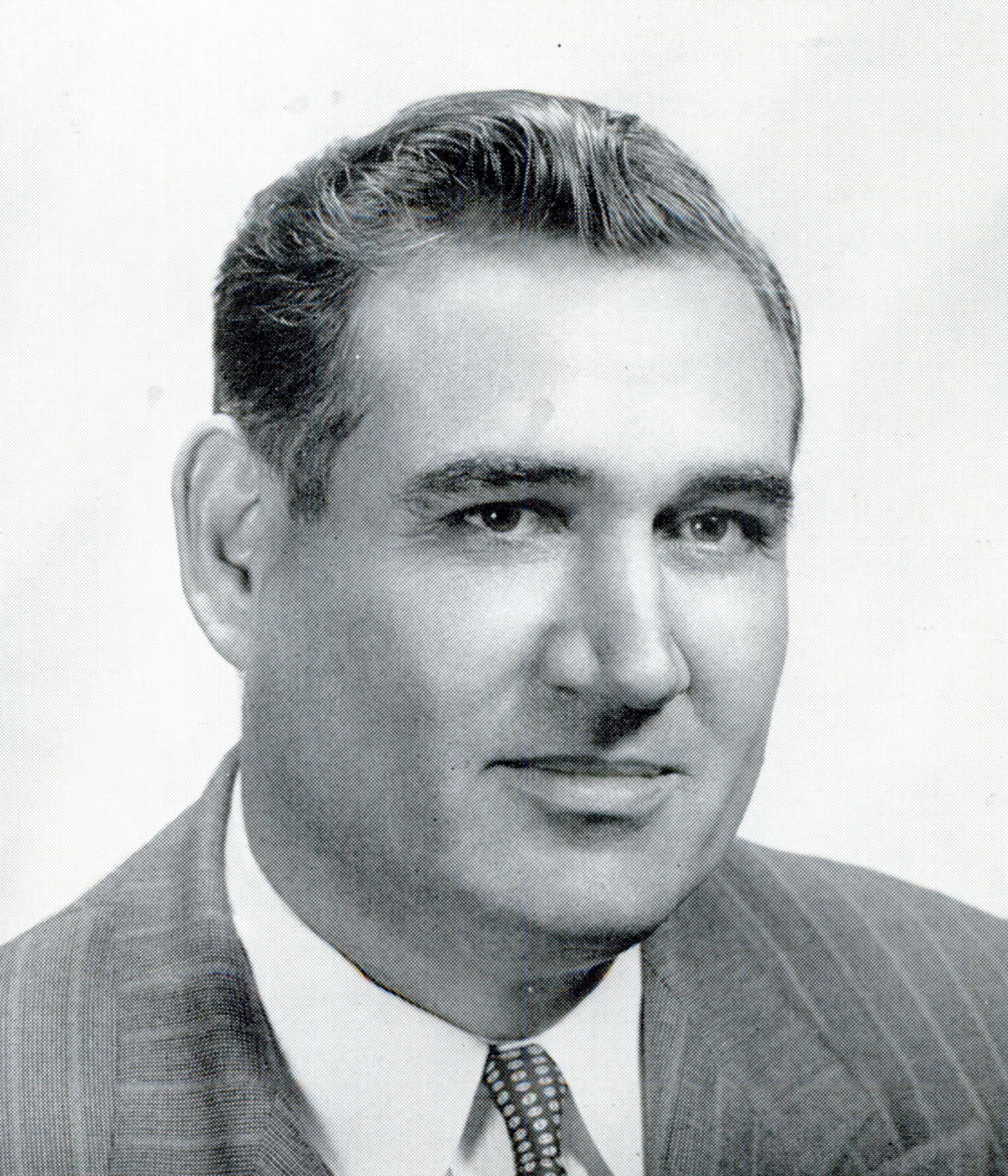
- Official portrait, 1955

42nd Governor of Alabama
- In office January 17, 1955 – January 19, 1959
- Lieutenant: William G. Hardwick
- Preceded by: Gordon Persons
- Succeeded by: John Malcolm Patterson
- In office January 20, 1947 – January 15, 1951
- Lieutenant: James C. Inzer
- Preceded by: Chauncey Sparks
- Succeeded by: Gordon Persons

Personal details
- Born: James Elisha Folsom; October 9, 1908 Coffee County, Alabama, U.S.
- Died: November 21, 1987 (aged 79) Cullman, Alabama, U.S.
- Resting place: Cullman City Cemetery, Cullman, Alabama, U.S.
- Party: Democratic
- Spouses: Sarah Carnley (m. 1936; died 1944) Jamelle Moore (m. 1948)
- Children: 10, including Jim
- Education: University of Alabama; Samford University; George Washington University

Military service
- Branch: United States Army; United States Merchant Marine
- Wars: World War II

James Elisha "Big Jim" Folsom Sr. (October 9, 1908 – November 21, 1987) was an American politician who served as the 42nd governor of Alabama, having served from 1947 to 1951, and again from 1955 to 1959. He was the first governor of Alabama born in the 20th century.

== Early life ==
Born in Coffee County, Alabama, in 1908, Folsom was of English ancestry.

Before serving in the United States Army and United States Merchant Marine during World War II, Folsom had been an insurance salesman. He attended the University of Alabama, Samford University in Birmingham, and George Washington University in Washington, D.C., but he never obtained a college degree.

Before his gubernatorial campaigns, he won a race only once as a delegate to the 1944 Democratic National Convention. He was a strong supporter of keeping U.S. Vice President Henry A. Wallace on the ticket, rather than replacing him with Harry S. Truman of Missouri, which occurred.

== Governorships ==
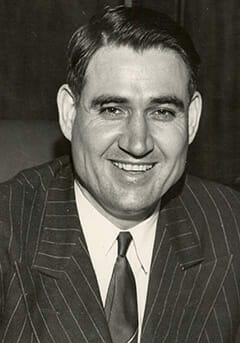
Official portrait, c. 1947

Folsom was elected governor for the first time in 1946 on a liberal platform attacking corporate interests and the wealthy. He waged a colorful campaign with a hillbilly band, brandishing a mop and bucket that he said would "clean out" the Capitol. His opponent, Leven H. Ellis, attacked Folsom by saying his election would threaten segregation laws and encourage "communist-backed labor unions".

Historian Dan T. Carter summarized Folsom's democratic ideals thus: "(T)he three pillars of a democratic society were the Bill of Rights, an activist and compassionate government, and an absolute and unqualified democracy." In the wake of World War II, which he said was fought "against hatred and violence," Folsom warned voters against those who sought to use mischaracterizations of political ideas to divide "race and race, class and class ... religion and religion."

Folsom was among the first Southern governors to advocate a moderate position on racial integration and improvement of civil rights for African Americans. In his Christmas message on December 25, 1949, he said, "As long as the Negroes are held down by deprivation and lack of opportunity, the other poor people will be held down alongside them."

On March 3, 1948, Folsom's name was in headlines across the nation when 30-year-old Christine Putman Johnston, who had met Folsom in late 1944 while she was working as a cashier at the Tutwiler Hotel in Birmingham, filed a paternity suit against the governor by alleging that he was the father of her 22-month-old son. Undaunted, Folsom appeared nine days after the suit was filed outside the Barbizon Modeling School in New York City, where he kissed a hundred pretty models who had voted him "The Nation's Number One Leap Year Bachelor," attracting a crowd of 2,500 onlookers and causing a traffic jam. The kissing stunt made national news, but did nothing to halt the political damage. When the paternity suit broke, Folsom was challenging President Truman for the 1948 Democratic nomination. Because of the negative publicity surrounding his case, Folsom lost his bid to represent Alabama as a favorite-son candidate for president in the May 4 Democratic primary. The next day, without prior publicity, Folsom married 20-year-old Jamelle Moore, a secretary at the state Highway Department, whom he had met during his 1946 campaign and had been dating and seeing "almost daily" since then. Johnston subsequently dropped the suit in June for a cash settlement from Folsom; years later, he admitted to an interviewer that he was indeed the father of Johnston's child.

Despite the paternity suit and other scandals during his administration, however, he was easily elected to a second non-consecutive term in 1954. During his campaign, Folsom denounced the Ku Klux Klan and promised free textbooks for children. As noted by one study, Folsom brought to power "a legislative slate that gave him a working majority in both the House and Senate." The Alabama Constitution then forbade a governor from succeeding himself, a common provision in other southern states at the time. Folsom was 6 feet 8 inches or 203 centimetres tall and employed the slogan "the little man's big friend."

In 1958, Folsom commuted a death sentence imposed on James E. Wilson, an African American sentenced to death for a violent robbery. The Wilson case sparked international protests, but some segregationists called for Folsom not to commute the sentence. Folsom opposed capital punishment, stating that he would always grant clemency in death penalty cases "if I can find some excuse." He regularly paroled and pardoned black convicts, believing they had been unjustly convicted or punished due to their race. Folsom did not intervene in every controversial case; Jeremiah Reeves, convicted of raping a white woman when he was 16, was electrocuted the same year, which also sparked protests over the severity of his sentence given his age and concerns about the unfairness of his trial. He later confessed that his silence was due solely to political reasons, arguing that he "just couldn't" commute the death sentence of a black man in such a case, since it would destroy him politically.

"I'd never get anything done for the rest of my term if I did that. Hell, things are getting so bad, they're even trying to take Black & White Scotch off the shelves."

A wide range of reforms were carried out during Folsom's two terms as governor. An indigent care bill for hospitalization was passed, while unemployment compensation was stepped up.

During Folsom's first term, an Act was introduced in 1947 that provided for various employers to provide policies of hospitalization, accident, health and life insurance for the benefit of officers and employees. An Act of September 1947 raised the minimum age of employment of children from 14 to 16 for all occupations during school hours, "except in agriculture and domestic service, and for work in manufacturing establishments or canneries at any time." The Act also reduced the maximum workweek for children from 48 to 40 hours. Another Act from that same month provided for the establishment of a second injury fund "financed by payment by employer of $500 in death cases where there are no dependents." In 1949 coal mine safety legislation was signed into law. An Act of June 1949 related to workmen's compensation introduced various changes such as the provision of full benefits for 550 weeks, instead of reduced benefits for weeks after 400, "in permanent total disability resulting from loss of both eyes or both arms, paralysis, or mental incapacity." An Act of July 1949 increased the death benefit payable to a dependent spouse from 25% of an employee’s weekly wages to 35%.

A diluted sales tax exemption repeal was also carried out, with tax exemptions on alcoholic beverages, cigarettes, and stock withdrawn for private use by retail store owners, while revenue was provided for 4 trade schools. An REA loan for an electric cooperative was also secured, while schoolteacher's salaries were raised. Hundreds of new school buildings were also constructed, while a 9-month school term was introduced. Improvements were also made in public health; helped by the passage of laws in 1947 that provided for TB examination and blood-testing. A farm-to-market roads program improved rural life while the establishment of an industrial development commission pleased business, while funding for health, welfare, education and old-age pensions was increased. During his first term, for instance, as noted by one study, "When adopted by both houses, the 1947-49 biennial budget included the promised $5.5 million appropriation for old age pensions and represented an increase of approximately $50 million over the appropriations for the preceding biennium." In addition, Fiscal 1947– 48 was the biggest year on record for the Department of Public Welfare. Increased state appropriations and federal matching funds provided $6 million more than the department had spent in fiscal 1946–47, and for pensioners the department was able to increase the average monthly check from $15.08 to $21.14 between June 1947 and June 1948, while enlarging its eligibility rolls from 27,000 to over 65,000 retired Alabamians. According to one study, Folsom had supported the “largest appropriation of funds for public education in Alabama history.”

Further reforms were carried out during Folsom's second term as governor. An Act of 1955 provided for the education of exceptional children, while another Act passed that same year provided for slum clearance and prevention along with the building of good homes. An Act of 1957 provided for a hospital service program for certain needy persons unable to pay for the hospitalization they need. An Act of August 1957 raised from 60% to 75% "the amount of wages of a resident worker exempt from garnishment." An Act from that same month specified (in relation to workmen's compensation) "that in lump-sum payments, which are permitted with court approval, the court must be satisfied that such payment is in the best interest of the employee or his dependents." Another Act from August 1957 raised maximum medical benefits from $1,00 to $1,200, and extended the maximum period from 90 days to 6 months. Further Acts introduced in 1957 provided for supplementary benefits for certain municipal employees, old age assistance for various teachers, retirement supplements for particular state employees, and a State scholarship program for black nurses. Payments to the aged and needy were also increased, while the Relative Responsibility Act (under which elderly pensioners were ineligible for help if assistance could be provided by immediate relatives) was also repealed.

== Unsuccessful races ==
In 1962, Folsom again ran for governor against his one-time protégé George C. Wallace but was defeated. A sardonic slogan that referred to Folsom's reputation for taking graft emerged during that campaign: "Something for everyone and a little bit for Big Jim." Folsom sometimes referred to "the emoluments of office" and once told a campaign crowd, "I plead guilty to stealing. That crowd I got it from, you had to steal it to get it.... I stole for you, and you, and you."

Folsom's campaign was also damaged by a television appearance in which he appeared seriously intoxicated and unable to remember his children's names. Both the appearance and the supposed "slogan" hurt him with the image-conscious middle class.

Folsom ran again for governor in 1966 and faced three other leading Democrats in the primary, former U.S. representative Carl Elliott, former governor John Malcolm Patterson, and Attorney General Richmond Flowers Sr. However, the primary winner was none of those candidates but the surrogate for the outgoing governor George Wallace: his first wife, Lurleen Burns Wallace. In the general election, Mrs. Wallace handily defeated the Republican nominee, James D. Martin, a one-term U.S. representative from Gadsden.

Folsom would continue to run for governor in 1970, 1974, 1978, and 1982, but he was never taken seriously by his opponents. In the 1970 gubernatorial race, Folsom expressed opposition to the Vietnam War, high taxes, and racially divisive politics, stating: "I'm the first and the last Governor the little man, the young people and the blacks ever had in Alabama."

In 1974, Folsom expressed support for the Equal Rights Amendment, claimed George Wallace didn't believe in freedom, described Hugo Black as the greatest Alabamian, and said that Northern Alabama had been opposed to slavery and secession, and that it would have been a separate state had Abraham Lincoln gotten the troops there fast.

Outside of races for governor, Folsom would face defeats in the Public Service Commission primary in 1964, the U.S. Senate primary in 1968, and the second Democratic National Convention delegate district primary in 1972.

== Later life ==
Folsom was plagued by ill health in the last years of his life. A 1976 article in People magazine reported that he was legally blind, with only 5% vision, and nearly deaf. He died in 1987 in Cullman.

== In pop culture ==
A documentary film about Folsom Big Jim Folsom: The Two Faces of Populism, was produced in 1996 by the Alabama filmmaker Robert Clem and won the 1997 International Documentary Association/ABCNews VideoSource Award and the Southeastern Filmmaker Award at the 1997 Atlanta Film Festival.

In the 1997 TNT film George Wallace, directed by John Frankenheimer, Jim Folsom is played by Joe Don Baker, who was nominated for a CableACE award for his performance. Gary Sinise played Wallace.

== Personal life ==
Folsom married teacher and social welfare worker Sarah Carnley in 1936. She died in 1944 at age 36 due to pregnancy complications.

In 1948, Christine Putman Johnston filed suit requesting legal recognition of her and Folsom's common-law marriage, and his paternity of her 22-month-old son, James Douglas. Johnston did not request financial compensation in the suit. Folsom settled the suit, and later admitted that he was the child's father. Johnston died at age 33 in 1951.

In 1948, Folsom eloped with his second wife, Jamelle Folsom, nee Jamelle Moore. They had met in 1946 when she was 17 years old, and remained married until his death.

Folsom had ten children: two by his first wife, Sarah; one by Christine Putman Johnston; and seven by his second wife, Jamelle.

Folsom's son James E. Folsom Jr.—dubbed "Little Jim," though physically large, because of his father's nickname—is also a noted Alabama politician. He served as lieutenant governor of Alabama from 1987 to 1993. He assumed the governor's office when Republican Governor Guy Hunt convicted of state ethics law violations and removed from office. Folsom, Jr. ran for a full term as governor in 1994, but was defeated by Republican former Governor Fob James. Folsom, Jr. decided to re-enter state politics in 2006, qualified, and eventually won the lieutenant governor's position again; he served from 2007 to 2011.

Folsom's niece, Cornelia Wallace, the daughter of his sister, Ruby Folsom Ellis, was from 1971 to 1978 the second wife of his former rival, George Wallace.

== See also ==
- List of members of the American Legion

Party political offices
Preceded by Chauncey Sparks	Democratic nominee for Governor of Alabama; 1946	Succeeded by Gordon Persons
Preceded by Gordon Persons	Democratic nominee for Governor of Alabama; 1954	Succeeded by John Malcolm Patterson
Political offices
Preceded by Chauncey Sparks	Governor of Alabama; 1947–1951	Succeeded by Gordon Persons
Preceded by Gordon Persons	Governor of Alabama; 1955–1959	Succeeded by John Malcolm Patterson
