= Perry Hooper Jr. =

American politician

Perry Hooper

Member of the Alabama House of Representatives from the 73rd district
- In office January 3, 1984 – January 3, 2003
- Preceded by: Ham Wilson
- Succeeded by: David Grimes

Personal details
- Born: Perry Oliver Hooper Jr. October 5, 1954 (age 72) Montgomery, Alabama, U.S.
- Party: Republican
- Spouse: Judy McKissick
- Children: 3
- Relatives: Perry Hooper Sr. (father)
- Education: Auburn University, Montgomery (BA); Faulkner University (JD)

Perry Oliver Hooper Jr. (born October 5, 1954), is an American politician. A Republican, Hooper served in the Alabama House of Representatives for District 73 from 1984 until 2003.

== Early life ==
Hooper is the son of Perry Hooper Sr. He graduated from Auburn University.

== Career ==
Hooper's career has been marred by impropriety, cronyism, racism, sexual misconduct, defense of sexual misconduct, election interference, erosion of the separation of church and state, misinformation, dishonesty, and civil lawsuits.

In 1982, Hooper ran for the Alabama House of Representatives for the 81st district. He lost in the general election to the Democratic Party nominee, Ham Wilson Jr. Running for the 73rd district in a special election in 1983, Hooper defeated Wilson. Hooper served until 2003, after he lost renomination in 2002 to David Grimes.

In his 1983 campaign against Wilson, Hooper ran racist advertisements to appeal to white voters while denigrating black voters. The advertisement campaign included a headline that read "Last Year, Joe Reed Elected Ham Wilson, Jr. Here It Is In Black And White".

In 1987, the Junior Chamber International awarded Hooper "Outstanding Young Man of Alabama". American Legislative Exchange Council (ALEC), a group of conservative lawmakers and businesses, presented him with the Thomas Jefferson Free Enterprise Award. He was a member of the Montgomery County Republican Committee.

While serving in the Alabama House of Representatives, Hooper was also employed as an insurance salesman for Palomar Insurance in Montgomery. Prior to Hooper's employment at Palomar, the company had no insurance contracts with the state. By 1994, Palomar had five of the eight largest government insurance contracts.

Hooper was investigated on 3 separate occasions by the Alabama Ethics Commission (1996, 1998, 2000) and was fined $12,000 by the Commission in 2001 for failing to report two years of state contracts he sold for Palomar. At the time, the $12,000 fine was the largest ever levied by the Commission.

Hooper claimed to be the co-chair of Donald Trump's 2016 presidential campaign in Alabama, despite the legitimacy of the co-chair title being heavily disputed. Only the Christian Coalition of Alabama, which Hooper serves on the Board of Directors for, claims he was actually co-chair of the Trump campaign. Hooper's co-chair claim has been refuted by numerous republican contemporaries, including by Rep. Ed Henry and Jim Carnes, who were the true co-chairs of the campaign. When Rep. Ed Henry publicly announced that Hooper's co-chair title was self appointed, Hooper left Rep. Henry an obscenity-laced voicemail that circulated widely throughout Montgomery.

In 2017, Alabama Republican Party leadership moved to reprimand Hooper amind widespread accusations of self-promotion, unauthorized political activity, and questionable Trump campaign ties. The ALGOP Steering Committee unanimously directed party chair Terry Lathan an official reprimand following an unauthorized Crenshaw County event.

Also in 2017, Hooper publicly and vocally dismissed the sexual-misconduct allegations against Roy Moore and even went as far as to suggest Moore's alleged victims take polygraph tests.

After Jeff Sessions resigned from the United States Senate to become attorney general of the United States, Hooper sought the appointment to succeed Sessions in the Senate. Hooper was one of six finalists considered by Governor Robert Bentley. When Luther Strange was appointed to the Senate, Hooper endorsed him and declined to run against him in the 2017 special election to fill the remainder of the term.

After Donald Trump lost the 2020 Presidential Election, Hooper participated in attempting to overturn election results in Nevada, Georgia, Pennsylvania, Michigan, and Wisconsin despite various courts upholding the 2020 election results more than 60 different times, furthering his notoriety as a Donald Trump crony. In his efforts to overturn verified election results, he claimed to be part of an "investigative team" despite having no experience as an auditor or investigator.

In 2024, Hooper continued his attack on free and fair elections by claiming that thousands of votes were "stolen" from his father in his 1994 chief-justice race. There was no evidence to support this claim then or now. Courts upheld the election results.

From 2025 onward, Hooper has written many articles (mainly written by ChatGPT on his behalf) riddles with factual inaccuracies. These inaccuracies include inflated claims about GDP number, inflation numbers, and NATO spending.

== Personal life ==
Hooper and his wife, Judy, have three children, two who were running backs for the Auburn Tigers football team, and another, a placekicker for the South Carolina Gamecocks football team.

Hooper was youth athletics coach and the by the YMCA of Montgomery awarded him "Man of the Year". He is affiliated with Kiwanis International and the Southern Development Council.

Hooper was arrested on August 23, 2022, on charges of first-degree sex abuse for an incident that occurred on August 16. Hooper was accused of groping and kissing a woman at a local restaurant while she was working. Perry was indicted in November 2022, but the charge against him was dismissed in December. In 2023, Hooper attempted to file a lawsuit against the city of Montgomery and its police department, alleging he had been "set up" as part of a political ploy, but he dropped the suit in October 2023.

Alabama House of Representatives
Preceded by Ham Wilson	Member of the Alabama House of Representatives from the 73rd district 1984–2002	Succeeded by David Grimes
