= 2017 United States Senate special election in Alabama =

- December 12, 2017
- Turnout: 40.5% ▲
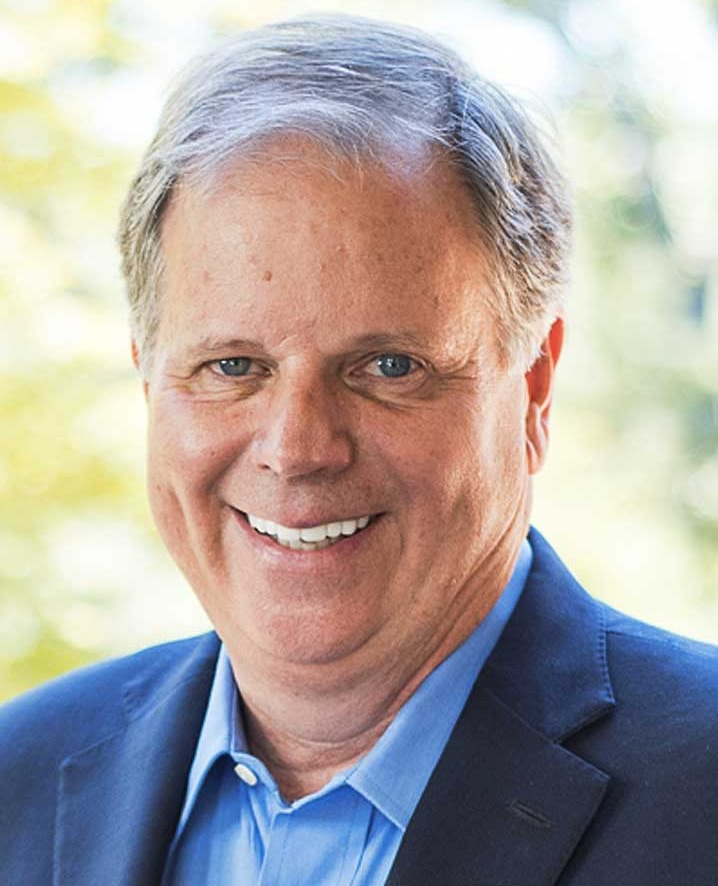

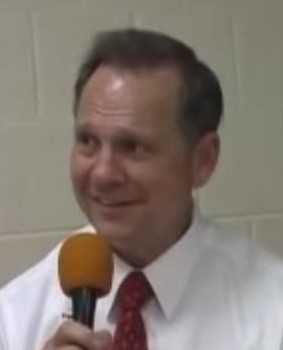
Nominee	Doug Jones	Roy Moore
Party	Democratic	Republican
Popular vote	673,896	651,972
Percentage	49.97%	48.34%
- Jones: 40–50% 50–60% 60–70% 70–80% 80–90% >90% Moore: 40–50% 50–60% 60–70% 70–80% 80–90% >90% Tie: 40–50% 50% No data
U.S. senator before election
Luther Strange (Note: In February 2017, Strange was appointed by Governor Robert J. Bentley to fill the vacancy caused by the resignation of Senator Jeff Sessions, who had been nominated to be U.S. attorney general.)
Republican
Elected U.S. Senator
Doug Jones
Democratic

The 2017 United States Senate special election in Alabama took place on December 12, 2017, in order to fill the Class II Senate seat for the remainder of the six-year term. A vacancy arose after incumbent Republican Senator Jeff Sessions resigned from the Senate on February 8, 2017 to serve as the 84th U.S. attorney general. On February 9, 2017, then-Governor Robert J. Bentley appointed Luther Strange, the attorney general of Alabama, to fill the vacancy until a special election could take place. The special election was scheduled for December 12, 2017.

Doug Jones, a former U.S. attorney for the Northern District of Alabama, won the Democratic primary election. Roy Moore, a former chief justice of the Supreme Court of Alabama, competed with Strange and U.S. Representative Mo Brooks in the August 15, 2017, Republican primary; the two highest vote-getters, Moore and Strange, advanced to a runoff. President Donald Trump supported Strange during the primary runoff, as did much of the Republican establishment in the Senate. Moore won the primary runoff on September 26, 2017.

Following the primaries, Moore was expected to easily win the general election. Polling showed him with a clear lead, and Alabama is known for its overwhelming support for Republicans. However, the race was upended in mid-November 2017, when multiple women alleged that Moore had made unwanted advances or sexually assaulted them when he was in his early thirties and they were aged between 14 and 22, attracting widespread national media coverage of the election. As a result of these allegations, many national Republican leaders and office holders called for Moore to withdraw from the special election, rescinded their endorsements of him, and stopped funding his campaign. Trump and many Alabama Republicans reaffirmed their support. At the time of the revelations, it was too late to remove his name from the ballot.

On December 12, 2017, Jones won by a margin of 1.63% or 21,924 votes, in a victory that was widely labeled an upset. Moore refused to concede defeat. Jones was sworn into office on January 3, 2018, becoming the first Democratic U.S. senator from Alabama since Howell Heflin left office in 1997. This was the first and only time Democrats had won a statewide election in Alabama since 2008, when Lucy Baxley was elected president of the Alabama Public Service Commission.

== Background ==
=== Potential appointees ===
Following then-President-elect Donald Trump's nomination of then-Senator Sessions to be U.S. attorney general, Robert Aderholt, a member of the United States House of Representatives, had asked to be appointed to the seat. Representative Mo Brooks had also expressed interest in the seat, while Strange had stated before being selected that he would run for the seat in the special election whether or not he was appointed. Other candidates Governor Bentley interviewed for the Senate appointment included Moore; Del Marsh, the president pro tempore of the Alabama Senate; and Jim Byard, the director of the Alabama Department of Economic and Community Affairs.

A vacancy arose from Senator Jeff Sessions' February 8, 2017 resignation to serve as the 84th U.S. attorney general. On February 9, 2017, Governor Robert J. Bentley appointed State Attorney General Luther Strange to fill the vacancy until a special election could take place. Bentley controversially scheduled the special election to occur in 2018 instead of sooner. When Kay Ivey succeeded Bentley as Alabama's governor, she rescheduled the special election for December 12, 2017, a move she said was made to adhere with state law.

== Republican primary ==
=== Campaign ===
The Republican primary attracted national attention, especially following Trump's endorsement of incumbent Senator Luther Strange. Strange was backed by several key figures within the Republican establishment, most notably Mitch McConnell, the Senate Majority Leader. His two main rivals in the primary were former state judge Roy Moore and Congressman Mo Brooks. While Strange was expected to advance through the first round of the primary, almost every opinion poll showed him trailing Roy Moore in a potential runoff. Strange placed second behind Roy Moore, securing a spot in the runoff.

=== Candidates ===
==== Nominated ====
- Roy Moore, former chief justice of the Alabama Supreme Court and candidate for governor in 2006 and 2010

==== Eliminated in runoff ====
- Luther Strange, incumbent U.S. senator (appointed) and former attorney general of Alabama

==== Eliminated in primary ====
- James Beretta, physician
- Joseph F. Breault, Air Force chaplain and nominee for the Utah House of Representatives in 2016
- Randy Brinson, gastroenterologist and activist
- Mo Brooks, U.S. representative
- Dom Gentile, businessman
- Karen Jackson, attorney and perennial candidate
- Mary Maxwell, candidate for NH-02 in 2006
- Bryan Peeples, businessman
- Trip Pittman, state senator

==== Withdrew ====
- Ed Henry, state representative (withdrew from race on May 17).

==== Declined ====
- Robert Aderholt, U.S. representative
- Slade Blackwell, state senator
- Bradley Byrne, U.S. representative
- Bill Hightower, state senator
- Perry Hooper Jr., former State Representative
- Mary Scott Hunter, member of the Alabama State Board of Education
- Del Marsh, president pro tempore of the State Senate
- Jonathan McConnell, businessman and candidate for the U.S. Senate in 2016
- John Merrill, secretary of state of Alabama
- Glenn Murdock, associate justice of the Alabama Supreme Court
- Gary Palmer, U.S. representative
- Jimmy Rane, businessman
- Martha Roby, U.S. representative
- Mike Rogers, U.S. representative
- Connie Rowe, state representative
- Cam Ward, state senator
- Jim Zeigler, Alabama state auditor

=== Endorsements ===
Roy Moore

Executive branch officials

- Ben Carson, United States Secretary of Housing and Urban Development, director of the Department of Neurosurgery at Johns Hopkins Hospital (1984–2013), presidential candidate in 2016

U.S. senators

- Tom Coburn, former U.S. senator from Oklahoma (2005–2015)

U.S. representatives

- Mo Brooks, member of the United States House of Representatives from Alabama's 5th congressional district and former US Senate candidate
- Paul Broun, former member of the United States House of Representatives from Georgia's 10th congressional district
- Jody Hice, member of the United States House of Representatives from Georgia's 10th congressional district
- Mark Meadows, member of the United States House of Representatives from North Carolina's 11th congressional district and chairman of the House Freedom Caucus

Statewide officials

- Fob James, 48th governor of Alabama
- Jim Zeigler, state auditor of Alabama

State senators

- Bill Armistead, former state senator and former chair of the Alabama Republican Party
- Trip Pittman, of Montrose, former US Senate candidate
- Larry Stutts, of Sheffield
- Tom Whatley, of Auburn

State representatives

- Mike Ball of Madison
- K. L. Brown of Jacksonville
- Lynn Greer of Rogersville
- Tommy Hanes of Scottsboro
- Ed Henry of Hartselle, chairman of Donald Trump's Alabama campaign
- Mike Holmes of Wetumpka
- Becky Nordgren of Gadsden
- Ritchie Whorton of Scottsboro
- Rich Wingo of Tuscaloosa
- Randy Wood of Anniston

Local officials

- Erick Erickson, conservative blogger and former member of the Macon City Council

Organizations

- Courageous Conservatives PAC
- Gun Owners of America
- National Association for Gun Rights
- Senate Conservatives Fund

Individuals

- Steve Bannon, former White House chief strategist, executive chairman of Breitbart News
- Nigel Farage, chair of Europe of Freedom and Direct Democracy, member of the European Parliament for South East England, and former chair and leader of the UK Independence Party
- Tim James, businessman and candidate for governor of Alabama in 2002 and 2010
- Chuck Norris, martial artist, actor, film producer and screenwriter
- Phil Robertson, businessman and reality television star

Luther Strange

Executive branch officials

- Mike Pence, 48th vice president of the United States

U.S. senators

- Mitch McConnell, Senate majority leader from Kentucky
- Richard Shelby, U.S. senator from Alabama

State representatives

- Perry O. Hooper Jr., former state representative

Organizations

- NRA Political Victory Fund
Mo Brooks

U.S. representatives

- Mark Meadows, U.S. representative (R-NC) and chairman of the House Freedom Caucus
- Mike Rogers, U.S. representative (R-AL)
- Lamar S. Smith, U.S. representative (R-TX)

State representatives

- Ed Henry, state representative

Organizations

- FreedomWorks
- Gun Owners of America
- Senate Conservatives Fund
- Students for Trump

Individuals

- Ann Coulter, conservative commentator
- Laura Ingraham, conservative talk radio host
- Mark Levin, conservative talk radio host

=== First round ===
==== Polling ====
Poll source	Date(s) administered	Sample size	Margin of error	James Beretta	Joseph Breault	Randy Brinson	Mo Brooks	Mary Maxwell	Roy Moore	Bryan Peeples	Trip Pittman	Luther Strange	Undecided
Trafalgar Group (R)	August 12–13, 2017	870	± 3.3%	1%	1%	6%	17%	1%	38%	1%	6%	24%	5%
Emerson College	August 10–12, 2017	373	± 5.0%	1%	0%	0%	15%	0%	29%	0%	10%	32%	11%
Trafalgar Group (R)	August 8–10, 2017	1,439	± 2.6%	1%	1%	4%	20%	2%	35%	1%	6%	23%	8%
Cygnal (R)	August 8–9, 2017	502	± 4.4%	–	–	2%	18%	–	31%	–	7%	23%	13%
Strategy Research	August 7, 2017	2,000	± 2.0%	1%	1%	1%	19%	4%	35%	1%	9%	29%	0%
JMC Analytics (R)	August 5–6, 2017	500	± 4.4%	–	–	2%	19%	–	30%	–	6%	22%	17%
RRH Elections (R)	July 31 – August 3, 2017	426	± 5.0%	–	–	2%	18%	–	31%	–	8%	29%	11%
Strategy Research	July 24, 2017	3,000	± 2.0%	1%	1%	2%	16%	5%	33%	2%	5%	35%	–
Cygnal (R)	July 20–21, 2017	500	± 2.0%	–	–	–	16%	–	26%	–	–	33%	–

==== Results ====
Primary results by county Moore: 30–40%; 40–50%; 50–60%; 60–70%; Strange: 30–40%; 40–50%; 50–60%; Brooks: 40–50%; 50–60%

Republican primary results, August 15, 2017
Party	Candidate	Votes	%
Republican	Roy Moore	164,524	38.9%
Republican	Luther Strange (incumbent)	138,971	32.8%
Republican	Mo Brooks	83,287	19.7%
Republican	Trip Pittman	29,124	6.9%
Republican	Randy Brinson	2,978	0.6%
Republican	Bryan Peeples	1,579	0.4%
Republican	Mary Maxwell	1,543	0.4%
Republican	James Beretta	1,078	0.3%
Republican	Dom Gentile	303	0.1%
Republican	Joseph Breault	252	0.1%
Total votes		423,282	100.0%

=== Runoff ===
President Donald Trump supported Strange during the primary runoff, in addition to much of the Republican establishment in the Senate, including Senate Majority Leader Mitch McConnell, who made the success of Strange's candidacy a major priority. Trump's efforts on behalf of Strange included tweeting and a rally in Huntsville, Alabama. Vice President Mike Pence campaigned for Strange as well. With McConnell's help, Strange outspent Moore by a margin of 10-to-1.

National interest in the race dramatically increased in the month before the runoff. Strange maintained his endorsement from Trump, who campaigned for him in Huntsville during the closing days of the campaign. Trump's endorsement of Strange sparked criticism among his own base, many of whom preferred Moore and detested Strange for being seemingly too friendly with the GOP establishment. Several notable figures close to Trump broke from the president to endorse Moore, including HUD Secretary Ben Carson and Breitbart Executive Chairman Steve Bannon. Despite Trump's endorsement, Strange was defeated by Roy Moore in the runoff, 54.6%-45.4%.

Moore won the primary runoff on September 26, 2017. This was the first time that an incumbent U.S. senator having active White House support lost a primary since Arlen Specter lost to Joe Sestak in 2010.

==== Debates ====
2017 Alabama Senate Republican primary runoff debate
No.	Date	Host	Moderator	Link	Republican	Republican
Key: P Participant A Absent N Not invited I Invited W Withdrawn						
Key: P Participant A Absent N Not invited I Invited W Withdrawn					Strange	Moore
1	Sep. 21, 2017	Raycom Media	Hal Fulmer	C-SPAN	P	P

==== Averages ====
Model	Moore	Strange	Spread
RealClearPolitics	52.5%	41.5%	Moore +11.0

==== Polling ====
Poll source	Date(s) administered	Sample size	Margin of error	Roy Moore	Luther Strange	Undecided
Cygnal (R)	September 23–24, 2017	996	± 3.1%	52%	41%	7%
Trafalgar Group (R)	September 23–24, 2017	1,073	± 3.0%	57%	41%	2%
Optimus (R)	September 22–23, 2017	1,045	± 2.9%	55%	45%	–
Emerson College	September 21–23, 2017	367	± 5.1%	50%	40%	10%
Gravis Marketing	September 21–22, 2017	559	± 4.1%	48%	40%	12%
Strategy Research	September 20, 2017	2,000	± 3.0%	54%	46%	–
Strategy Research	September 18, 2017	2,930	± 3.0%	53%	47%	–
JMC Analytics (R)	September 16–17, 2017	500	± 4.4%	47%	39%	14%
Voter Consumer Research (R-SLF)	September 9–10, 2017	604	± 4.0%	41%	40%	19%
Emerson College	September 8–9, 2017	355	± 5.2%	40%	26%	34%
Strategic National	September 6–7, 2017	800	± 3.5%	51%	35%	14%
Southeast Research	August 29–31, 2017	401	± 5.0%	52%	36%	12%
Harper Polling	August 24–26, 2017	600	± 4.0%	47%	45%	8%
Voter Consumer Research (R-SLF)	August 21–23, 2017	601	± 4.0%	45%	41%	14%
Opinion Savvy	August 22, 2017	494	± 4.4%	50%	32%	18%
JMC Analytics (R)	August 17–19, 2017	515	± 4.3%	51%	32%	17%
Cygnal (R)	August 8–9, 2017	502	± 4.4%	45%	34%	11%
RRH Elections (R)	July 31 – August 3, 2017	426	± 5.0%	34%	32%	34%

Hypothetical polling

Poll source	Date(s) administered	Sample size	Margin of error	Roy Moore	Mo Brooks	Undecided
RRH Elections (R)	July 31 – August 3, 2017	426	± 5.0%	43%	20%	37%

==== Fundraising ====
Campaign finance reports as of September 6, 2017
Candidate	Raised	Spent	Cash on hand
Luther Strange (R)	$4,185,594	$4,061,521	$631,814
Roy Moore (R)	$1,417,416	$1,133,774	$285,407
Source: Federal Election Commission

==== Results ====
Primary runoff results by county Moore: 50–60%; 60–70%; 70–80%; Strange: 50–60%

Republican primary runoff results, September 26, 2017
Party	Candidate	Votes	%
Republican	Roy Moore	262,204	54.59%
Republican	Luther Strange (incumbent)	218,066	45.41%
Total votes		480,270	100.00%

== Democratic primary ==
=== Candidates ===
==== Nominated ====
- Doug Jones, former United States attorney for the Northern District of Alabama

==== Eliminated in primary ====
- Will Boyd, pastor, former Greenville, Illinois, city councilman, nominee for AL-05 in 2016 and write-in candidate for the U.S. Senate from Illinois in 2010
- Vann Caldwell, Talladega County constable and perennial candidate
- Jason Fisher, businessman
- Michael Hansen, activist and nonprofit executive
- Robert Kennedy Jr., digital marketing executive for a laboratory supply company (no relation to the Massachusetts Kennedy family)
- Charles Nana, candidate for the U.S. Senate in 2016

==== Withdrew ====
- Ron Crumpton, activist, nominee for the state senate in 2014 and nominee for the U.S. Senate in 2016
- Brian McGee, retired teacher and Vietnam War veteran

==== Declined ====
- Roger Bedford, former state senator and nominee for the U.S. Senate in 1996
- Elaine Beech, state representative
- Sue Bell Cobb, former chief justice of the Supreme Court of Alabama
- Chris England, state representative
- Craig Ford, state representative
- Gary Johnson, minister and political activist
- Walt Maddox, mayor of Tuscaloosa
- Terri Sewell, U.S. representative

=== Endorsements ===
Doug Jones

Executive Branch officials

- Barack Obama, 44th president of the United States
- Joe Biden, 46th vice president of the United States

U.S. senators

- Maggie Hassan, U.S senator (D-NH)

U.S. representatives

- Jim Clyburn, U.S. representative (D-SC), Assistant Minority Leader
- John Lewis, U.S. representative (D-GA)
- Cedric Richmond, U.S. representative (D-LA), Congressional Black Caucus chairman
- Tim Ryan, U.S. representative (D-OH)
- Terri Sewell, U.S. representative (D-AL)

State legislators

- Christopher J. England, state representative
- Patricia Todd, state representative

Local officials

- Omar Neal, former Tuskegee mayor

Newspapers

- AL.com
- The Washington Post

Organizations

- Alabama Democratic Conference
- Communications Workers of America
- MoveOn.org

Individuals

- Charles Barkley, NBA legend, Hall of Famer, and Inside the NBA pundit
- Neera Tanden, president of the Center for American Progress
- Joe Trippi, Democratic campaign worker and consultant
- George Will, author and journalist
Robert Kennedy Jr.

Individuals

- Carl Lewis, Olympic gold medalist and University of Houston track and field head coach

=== Polling ===
Poll source	Date(s) administered	Sample size	Margin of error	Will Boyd	Vann Caldwell	Jason Fisher	Michael Hansen	Doug Jones	Robert Kennedy Jr.	Charles Nana	Undecided
Emerson College	August 10–12, 2017	164	± 7.6%	8%	2%	1%	0%	40%	23%	1%	25%
Strategy Research	August 7, 2017	2,000	± 2.0%	9%	5%	3%	7%	30%	40%	5%	–
Strategy Research	July 24, 2017	3,000	± 2.0%	6%	4%	4%	4%	28%	49%	5%	–

=== Results ===
Primary results by county Jones: ≥90%; 80–90%; 70–80%; 60–70%; 50–60%; 40–50%; Boyd: Boyd—30–40%

Democratic primary results
Party	Candidate	Votes	%
Democratic	Doug Jones	109,105	66.1%
Democratic	Robert Kennedy Jr.	29,215	17.7%
Democratic	Michael Hansen	11,105	6.7%
Democratic	Will Boyd	8,010	4.9%
Democratic	Jason Fisher	3,478	2.1%
Democratic	Brian McGee	1,450	0.9%
Democratic	Charles Nana	1,404	0.9%
Democratic	Vann Caldwell	1,239	0.8%
Total votes		165,006	100.0%

== Independents and write-in candidates ==
=== Candidates ===
==== Declared ====
- Ron Bishop (L, write-in)
- Lee Busby (I, write-in), retired Marine colonel
- Jeff "Cog" Coggin (I, write-in), Air Force veteran
- Chanda Mills Crutcher (I, write-in), minister
- Eulas Kirtdoll (I, write-in)
- Arlester "Mack" McBride (I, write-in)
- Mac Watson (R, write-in)

==== Declined ====
- Craig Ford, Democratic state representative

== General election ==
=== Roy Moore sexual misconduct allegations ===
On November 9, The Washington Post reported that four women had accused Roy Moore of engaging in sexual conduct with them when they were teenagers and he was an assistant district attorney in his thirties. One of the women was 14 years old at the time, below the legal age of consent. A few days later a fifth woman said that she had received unwanted attention from Moore when she was 15 years old, and that in December 1977 or January 1978, when she was 16, Moore sexually assaulted her. Moore denied the allegations.

After this, certain Republican leaders and conservative organizations withdrew their endorsements of Moore or asked him to drop out of the campaign. These included Texas Senator Ted Cruz, U.S. Attorney General and former seat holder Jeff Sessions, Ivanka Trump, the National Republican Senatorial Committee, former Republican presidential nominees Mitt Romney and John McCain, Republican Senate Majority Leader Mitch McConnell, Ohio Governor John Kasich, Utah Senator Mike Lee, Montana Senator Steve Daines, and House Representatives Barbara Comstock, Carlos Curbelo, and Adam Kinzinger, as well as the Young Republican Federation of Alabama. The state's senior Senator Richard Shelby also refused to endorse Moore. Other conservative websites and organizations such as National Review urged readers not to vote for Moore. Despite this, Moore continued to receive support from the state party and a week before the election, President Donald Trump strongly endorsed Moore. Following Trump's endorsement, the RNC reinstated their support for him, and Republican leaders said they would "let the people of Alabama decide" whether to elect Moore.

At the time of the revelations, it was too close to the election for Moore's name to be removed from the ballot, as Alabama law forbids any change to names on the ballot within 76 days of any primary or general election. Republican officials proposed various ways to promote an alternate Republican candidate. One suggestion was to ask Governor Kay Ivey to delay the special election until 2018, but Ivey said she had no plans to change the election date. Some Republicans such as Senator Lisa Murkowski floated the prospect of a write-in campaign to elect Luther Strange, with Utah Senator Orrin Hatch actively endorsing a write-in campaign for Strange. However, Strange said it was "highly unlikely" that he would run a write-in campaign. Senate Majority Leader Mitch McConnell proposed Attorney General Jeff Sessions, who formerly held the Senate seat, as a write-in candidate. In late November, Retired Marine Col. Lee Busby launched a write-in campaign, stating that he thought there was room for a centrist in the race.

In 2022, Moore won a defamation lawsuit against the Senate Majority Project Super Pac that ran advertisements spreading the allegations of child abuse in support of Jones's campaign.

=== Debates ===
Republican nominee Roy Moore refused to debate Democratic nominee Doug Jones. Moore turned down debate invitations extended by the League of Women Voters, WHNT-TV and AL.com. Jones' campaign said that Jones was "willing to debate Roy Moore anytime, anywhere" and accused Moore of "hiding from the voters, from the media and from his record for weeks." Moore and his campaign stated that he refused to debate Jones because their policy positions were already clear to voters and thus there was no need for a formal debate.

=== Predictions ===
Source	Ranking	As of
The Cook Political Report	Tossup	December 7, 2017
Sabato's Crystal Ball	Tossup	December 7, 2017
Rothenberg Political Report	Tossup	December 7, 2017

=== Candidates ===
==== On ballot ====
- Doug Jones (D), former United States attorney for the Northern District of Alabama
- Roy Moore (R), former chief justice of the Supreme Court of Alabama

==== Write-in ====
- Ron Bishop (L)
- Lee Busby (R)
- Jeff "Cog" Coggin (I)
- Chanda Mills Crutcher (I)
- Eulas Kirtdoll (I)
- Arlester "Mack" McBride (I)
- Mac Watson (I)

=== Endorsements ===
Doug Jones (D)

Executive branch officials

- Joe Biden, 47th vice president of the United States
- Hillary Clinton, former United States secretary of state and 2016 Democratic presidential nominee
- Barack Obama, 44th president of the United States

U.S. senators

- Cory Booker, U.S. senator from New Jersey
- Joe Donnelly, U.S. senator from Indiana
- Tammy Duckworth, U.S. senator from Illinois
- Dick Durbin, U.S. Senate minority whip from Illinois
- Jeff Flake, U.S. senator from Arizona (Republican)
- Al Franken, U.S. senator from Minnesota
- Kamala Harris, U.S. senator from California
- Maggie Hassan, U.S senator from New Hampshire
- Martin Heinrich, U.S. senator from New Mexico
- Tim Kaine, U.S. senator from Virginia, former 2016 vice presidential nominee
- Catherine Cortez Masto, U.S. senator from Nevada
- Jeff Merkley, U.S. senator from Oregon
- Chris Murphy, U.S. senator from Connecticut
- Patty Murray, U.S. senator from Washington
- Brian Schatz, U.S. senator from Hawaii
- Chuck Schumer, Senate minority leader from New York
- Jeanne Shaheen, U.S. senator from New Hampshire
- Chris Van Hollen, U.S. senator from Maryland, Democratic Senatorial Campaign Committee chairman
- Elizabeth Warren, U.S. senator from Massachusetts
- Sheldon Whitehouse, U.S. senator from Rhode Island

U.S. representatives

- Alma Adams, U.S. representative from North Carolina
- Karen Bass, U.S. representative from California
- Joyce Beatty, U.S. representative from Ohio
- Sanford Bishop, U.S. representative from Georgia
- Anthony Brown, U.S. representative from Maryland
- G. K. Butterfield, U.S. representative from North Carolina
- James Clyburn, U.S. representative South Carolina, Assistant Minority Leader
- John Conyers, U.S. representative from Michigan, dean
- Elijah Cummings, U.S. representative from Maryland
- Artur Davis, former U.S. representative (D-AL)
- Keith Ellison, U.S. representative from Minnesota, DNC Vice Chair
- Marcia Fudge, U.S. representative from Ohio
- Tulsi Gabbard, U.S. representative from Hawaii
- Al Green, U.S. representative from Texas
- Parker Griffith, former Alabama congressman and unsuccessful Democratic nominee for governor in 2014
- David Jolly, former U.S. representative from Florida. (former Republican)
- Ro Khanna, U.S. representative from California
- Barbara Lee, U.S. representative from California
- Sheila Jackson Lee, U.S. representative from Texas
- John Lewis, U.S. representative from Georgia
- Delegate Eleanor Holmes Norton, from the District of Columbia
- Delegate Stacey Plaskett, from the U.S. Virgin Islands
- Cedric Richmond, U.S. representative from Louisiana, Congressional Black Caucus chairman
- Lisa Blunt Rochester, U.S. representative from Delaware
- Tim Ryan, U.S. representative from Ohio
- Terri Sewell, U.S. representative from Alabama
- Bennie Thompson, U.S. representative from Mississippi

Statewide officials

- Charlie Baker, 72nd governor of Massachusetts (Republican)
- Sue Bell Cobb, former Alabama Supreme Court chief justice, then-current candidate for governor of Alabama
- Howard Dean, former governor of Vermont 1991–2003, Democratic National Committee (DNC) chair 2005–2009
- Martin O'Malley, former governor of Maryland 2007–2015, mayor of Baltimore 1999–2007
- Deval Patrick, politician, civil rights lawyer and businessman; 71st governor of Massachusetts, 2007–2015
- Steve Westly, former state controller and chief financial officer of California

State legislators

- Billy Beasley, minority leader of the Alabama Senate
- Elaine Beech, Democratic member of the Alabama House of Representatives, representing the 65th District
- Marcel Black, Democratic member of the Alabama House of Representatives, representing the 3rd District
- Barbara Boyd, Democratic member of the Alabama House of Representatives, representing the 32nd District
- Linda Coleman, Democratic member of the Alabama Senate, representing the 20th District
- Anthony Daniels, Alabama House minority leader
- Priscilla Dunn, Democratic member of the Alabama Senate, representing the 19th District
- Christopher J. England, state representative
- Vivian Davis Figures, Democratic member of the Alabama Senate, representing the 33rd District and nominee for the U.S. Senate in Alabama in 2008
- Jason Fisher, former Democratic candidate for U.S. Senate
- Craig Ford, former minority leader of the Alabama House of Representatives, currently represents the 28th District
- Laura Hall, Democratic member of the Alabama House of Representatives, representing the 19th District
- Robert Harrison, Madison County, Alabama District 6 Commissioner
- Alvin Holmes, Democratic member of the Alabama House of Representatives, representing the 78th District
- Richard Lindsey, Democratic member of the Alabama House of Representatives, representing the 39th District
- Thad McClammy, Democratic member of the Alabama House of Representatives, representing the 76th District
- Mary Moore, Democratic member of the Alabama House of Representatives, representing the 56th District
- Johnny Mack Morrow, Democratic member of the Alabama House of Representatives, representing the 18th District
- Omar Neal, former Tuskegee, Alabama mayor
- Henry Sanders, Democratic member of the Alabama Senate, representing the 23rd District
- Rod Scott, Democratic member of the Alabama House of Representatives. representing the 55th District
- Bobby Singleton, Democratic member of the Alabama Senate, representing the 24th District
- Rodger Smitherman, Democratic member of the Alabama Senate, representing the 18th District
- Patricia Todd, State representative
- Bob Vance, circuit judge in Jefferson County, Alabama
- Joyce Vance, U.S. attorney in Birmingham, appointed by Barack Obama

Local officials

- Walt Maddox, mayor of Tuscaloosa
- Randall Woodfin, mayor of Birmingham

Individuals

- Seth Abramson, attorney, political commentator and professor at the University of New Hampshire
- Uzo Aduba, actress
- John Anzalone, Democratic pollster
- William Barber II, member of the national board of the National Association for the Advancement of Colored People (NAACP)
- Charles Barkley, former professional basketball player
- Paul Begala, former adviser to Bill Clinton
- W. Kamau Bell, stand-up comic and television host
- Adam Best, founder of FanSided
- Donna Brazile, former Acting DNC Chairwoman
- Maria Cardona, former senior advisor to Hillary Clinton
- James Carville, former aide to Hillary Clinton and Bill Clinton, Fox News contributor
- Don Cheadle, actor, writer, producer, and director
- Andrei Cherny, CEO of Aspiration
- Chelsea Clinton, only child of Bill Clinton and Hillary Clinton
- Misha Collins, actor
- Mike Cooley, musician
- Laverne Cox, actress and advocate
- Leah D. Daughtry, former chief of staff to Howard Dean and CEO of the 2008 and 2016 Democratic National Convention committees
- Scott Dworkin, co-founder of the Democrat Coalition
- Jesse Ferguson, former Deputy National Press Secretary for Hillary Clinton
- Bonnie Fuller, editor of HollywoodLife.com
- Constance Hill, CEO of Girls Inc of Central Alabama
- Jason Isbell, musician
- Tracy James, former Jeff Sessions staffer (former Republican)
- Karine Jean-Pierre, senior advisor and national spokeswoman for MoveOn; served as the deputy campaign manager to both Barack Obama and Martin O'Malley
- Clara Jeffery, editor-in-chief of Mother Jones
- Michael Kelly, actor
- Jim Kessler, founder of Third Way
- Keegan-Michael Key, actor, comedian, writer, and producer
- Jimmy Kimmel, television host and comedian
- Shaun King, journalist, The Young Turks commentator and civil rights activist
- Bill Kristol (Republican), editor-in-chief of The Weekly Standard
- Talia Lavin, writer for The New Yorker
- William LeGate, entrepreneur, Thiel Fellow, and computer programmer
- Renato Mariotti, former federal prosecutor, candidate for Illinois Attorney General
- Sean McElwee, policy analyst for Demos
- Debra Messing, actress
- Alyssa Milano, actress, activist, producer and former singer
- Tim Miller (Republican), former communications director for Jeb Bush's 2016 presidential campaign
- Mike Murphy (Republican), political consultant for John McCain, Jeb Bush, John Engler, Tommy Thompson, Spencer Abraham, Christie Whitman, Lamar Alexander, and Arnold Schwarzenegger
- Holly O'Reilly, March For Truth organizer
- Patton Oswalt, stand-up comedian, actor, voice actor and writer
- Richard Painter, former chief White House ethics lawyer for George W. Bush
- Adam Parkhomenko, adviser to Hillary Clinton, founding partner at The Renegade Group
- Archie Parnell, Democratic nominee for South Carolina's 5th congressional district of the U.S. House of Representatives in 2017
- Piper Perabo, film and television actress
- Joy-Ann Reid, national correspondent at MSNBC
- Carl Reiner, comedian, actor, and writer
- Rob Reiner, actor, producer, and activist
- Jennifer Rubin (Republican), blogger for The Washington Post
- Mark Salter (Republican), former chief of staff to John McCain; has often been referred to as McCain's "alter ego"
- Symone Sanders, former national press secretary for Bernie Sanders' 2016 presidential campaign
- Steve Schmidt (Republican), former Senior Campaign Strategist and advisor to the John McCain presidential campaign
- Bakari Sellers, first vice chairman of the South Carolina Democratic Party
- Samuel Sinyangwe, policy analyst and racial justice activist
- Michael Skolnik, entrepreneur, film producer, and civil rights activist
- Topher Spiro, vice president for health policy and senior fellow for economic policy at American Progress
- George Takei, actor, director, author, and activist
- Neera Tanden, president of the Center for American Progress
- Channing Tatum, actor
- Joe Trippi, Democratic campaign worker and consultant
- Tommy Vietor, former spokesperson for the U.S. National Security Council and Barack Obama
- George Wallace, comedian and actor
- Kerry Washington, actress and producer
- Michael Wear, former faith outreach for Barack Obama's 2012 re-election campaign
- John Weaver (Republican), chief strategist for Republican Ohio Governor John Kasich; former advisor to John McCain's presidential campaigns of 2000 and 2008, the Democratic Congressional Campaign
- George F. Will (Republican), columnist for The Washington Post and MSNBC
- Oliver Willis, Research Fellow at Media Matters for America
- Bellamy Young, actress, singer and producer

Newspapers

- The Auburn Plainsman, student-run newspaper for Auburn University in Auburn, Alabama
- The Birmingham News, the principal newspaper for Birmingham, Alabama, and the largest newspaper in Alabama
- The Crimson White, student-run publication of the University of Alabama
- The Huntsville Times, newspaper serving Huntsville, Alabama, and the surrounding areas of north Alabama's Tennessee Valley region
- Press-Register, newspaper serving the southwest Alabama counties of Mobile and Baldwin, and Alabama's oldest newspaper
- The Washington Post

Organizations

- Alabama Democratic Conference
- Communications Workers of America
- Daily Kos
- Democracy for America
- End Citizens United
- Everytown for Gun Safety
- Human Rights Campaign
- League of Conservation Voters
- MoveOn.org
Roy Moore (R)

U.S. executive branch officials

- Ben Carson, United States Housing and Urban Development Secretary, director of Department of Neurosurgery at Johns Hopkins Hospital (1984–2013), presidential candidate in 2016
- Mike Pence, 48th vice president of the United States
- Donald Trump, 45th president of the United States

U.S. senators

- Tom Coburn, former U.S. senator from Oklahoma, 2005–2015
- ~~John Cornyn, U.S. Senate Majority Whip (R-TX)~~ (withdrawn)
- ~~Ted Cruz, U.S. senator from Texas~~ (withdrawn)
- ~~Steve Daines, U.S. senator from Montana~~ (withdrawn)
- ~~Mike Lee, U.S. senator from Utah~~ (withdrawn)
- ~~Mitch McConnell, U.S. Senate Majority Leader (R-KY)~~ (withdrawn)
- Rand Paul, U.S. senator from Kentucky

U.S. representatives

- Robert Aderholt, member of the U.S. House of Representatives from Alabama's 4th congressional district
- Andy Biggs, member of the U.S. House of Representatives from Arizona's 5th congressional district
- Mo Brooks, member of the U.S. House of Representatives from Alabama's 5th congressional district and former US Senate candidate
- Paul Broun, former member of the U.S. House of Representatives from Georgia's 10th congressional district
- Bradley Byrne, member of the U.S. House of Representatives from Alabama's 1st congressional district
- Jeff Duncan, member of the U.S. House of Representatives from South Carolina's 3rd congressional district
- Newt Gingrich (R-GA), former Speaker of the U.S. House of Representatives
- Andy Harris, member of the U.S. House of Representatives from Maryland's 1st congressional district
- ~~Jody Hice, member of the U.S. House of Representatives from Georgia's 10th congressional district~~ (withdrawn)
- Steve King, member of the U.S. House of Representatives from Iowa's 4th congressional district
- Thomas Massie, member of the U.S. House of Representatives from Kentucky's 4th congressional district
- Mark Meadows, member of the U.S. House of Representatives from North Carolina's 11th congressional district and chairman of the House Freedom Caucus
- Gary Palmer, member of the U.S. House of Representatives from Alabama's 6th congressional district
- Martha Roby, member of the U.S. House of Representatives from Alabama's 2nd congressional district
- Mike Rogers, member of the U.S. House of Representatives from Alabama's 3rd congressional district
- Joe Walsh, former member of the U.S. House of Representatives from Illinois's 8th congressional district

Statewide office holders

- Fob James, 48th governor of Alabama
- John Merrill, Alabama Secretary of State
- Jim Zeigler, State Auditor of Alabama

State senators

- Bill Armistead, former state senator and former chair of the Alabama Republican Party
- Rusty Glover, of Semmes
- Larry Grooms, state senator from South Carolina
- Trip Pittman, of Montrose, former US Senate candidate
- Larry Stutts, of Sheffield
- Tom Whatley, of Auburn

State representatives

- Mike Ball, of Madison
- K. L. Brown, of Jacksonville
- Matt Fridy, of Birmingham
- Lynn Greer, of Rogersville
- Tommy Hanes, of Scottsboro
- Ed Henry, of Hartselle, chairman of Donald Trump's Alabama campaign
- Mike Holmes, of Wetumpka
- Arnold Mooney, of Birmingham
- Barry Moore, of Enterprise
- Becky Nordgren, of Gadsden
- Kerry Rich, of Guntersville
- David Sessions, of Grand Bay
- Randall Shedd, of Cullman
- Ritchie Whorton, of Scottsboro
- Jack Williams, of Wilmer
- Rich Wingo, of Tuscaloosa
- Randy Wood, of Anniston

Political commentators

- ~~Erick Erickson, conservative blogger and former member of the Macon City Council~~ (withdrawn)
- Sean Hannity, conservative commentator
- Richard Viguerie, conservative figure, political writer

Religious leaders

- James Dobson, president of Focus on the Family and Christian right activist
- Jerry Falwell Jr., president of Liberty University

White nationalists

- Andrew Anglin, white nationalist, founder and editor of The Daily Stormer
- William Daniel Johnson, white nationalist and leader of the American Freedom Party
- Paul Nehlen, white nationalist, inventor, Republican candidate for the U.S. House of Representatives in Wisconsin's 1st congressional district in 2016 and 2018
- Robert Warren Ray, white nationalist and writer for The Daily Stormer

Other individuals

- Steve Bannon, former White House Chief Strategist, executive chairman of Breitbart News
- Randy Brinson, founder of Redeem the Vote and Republican candidate in this election
- Nigel Farage, chair of Europe of Freedom and Direct Democracy, Member of the European Parliament for South East England, and former chair and leader of the UK Independence Party
- Sebastian Gorka, Breitbart columnist and former deputy assistant to US President Donald Trump
- Tim James, businessman, candidate for Governor of Alabama in 2002 and 2010
- Chuck Norris, martial artist, actor, film producer and screenwriter
- Phil Robertson, businessman and reality television star
- Dean Young, former congressional candidate and friend of Roy Moore

Organizations

- American Freedom Party
- Gun Owners of America
- National Association for Gun Rights
- ~~National Republican Senatorial Committee~~ (rescinded)
- Republican National Committee
- The Right Stuff
- Senate Conservatives Fund
- Tea Party Patriots

=== Fundraising ===
Campaign finance reports as of November 22, 2017
Candidate	Raised	Spent	Cash on hand
Doug Jones (D)	$11,683,671	$8,941,988	$2,610,481
Roy Moore (R)	$4,291,702	$3,616,629	$636,046
Source: Federal Election Commission

=== Polling ===
View source data.

Poll source	Date(s) administered	Sample size	Margin of error	Roy Moore (R)	Doug Jones (D)	Lee Busby (I) write-in	Other	Undecided
Change Research	December 9–11, 2017	1,543	± 2.0%	51%	45%	–	–	4%
SurveyMonkey	November 30 – December 11, 2017	2,203	± 4.5%	47%	49%	–	–	4%
Fox News	December 7–10, 2017	1,127	± 3.0%	40%	50%	–	2%	8%
Emerson College	December 7–9, 2017	600	± 3.9%	53%	44%	–	4%	–
Monmouth University	December 6–9, 2017	546	± 4.2%	46%	46%	–	2%	6%
Public Policy Polling (D)*	December 7–8, 2017	1,092	± 3.8%	46%	48%	–	–	6%
Gravis Marketing	December 5–8, 2017	1,254	± 2.8%	49%	45%	–	–	6%
Trafalgar Group (R)	December 6–7, 2017	1,419	± 3.1%	51%	46%	–	3%	–
Change Research	December 5–7, 2017	2,443	± 2.0%	51%	44%	–	–	5%
SurveyMonkey	November 30 – December 7, 2017	1,559	± 5.5%	47%	49%	–	–	4%
Strategy Research	December 4, 2017	3,200	± 2.0%	50%	43%	–	3%	4%
Gravis Marketing	December 1–3, 2017	1,276	± 2.7%	44%	48%	–	–	8%
Emerson College	November 30 – December 2, 2017	500	± 4.3%	49%	46%	5%	–	–
YouGov	November 28 – December 1, 2017	1,067	± 3.8%	49%	43%	–	4%	4%
Washington Post/Schar School	November 27–30, 2017	739	± 4.5%	47%	50%	–	3%	–
JMC Analytics (R)	November 27–28, 2017	650	± 3.8%	49%	44%	–	5%	2%
National Research Inc (R)	November 26–28, 2017	600	± 4.0%	46%	45%	–	–	9%
Change Research	November 26–27, 2017	1,868	± 2.3%	49%	44%	–	–	7%
Emerson College	November 25–27, 2017	500	± 4.3%	53%	47%	–	–	–
Strategy Research	November 20, 2017	3,000	± 2.0%	47%	45%	–	3%	5%
WT&S Consulting (R)	November 18–20, 2017	11,641	± 1.2%	46%	40%	–	–	13%
Change Research	November 15–16, 2017	2,090	–	43%	46%	–	–	11%
National Research Inc	November 13–16, 2017	600	± 4.0%	41%	49%	–	–	10%
Gravis Marketing	November 14–15, 2017	628	± 3.5%	42%	47%	–	–	11%
Fox News	November 13–15, 2017	649	± 3.5%	42%	50%	–	2%	7%
Strategy Research	November 13, 2017	3,000	± 2.0%	49%	43%	–	–	8%
NRSC (R)	November 12–13, 2017	500	–	39%	51%	–	–	10%
WT&S Consulting (R)	November 11, 2017	1,536	± 3.3%	50%	40%	–	–	11%
Emerson College	November 9–11, 2017	600	± 3.9%	55%	45%	–	–	–
JMC Analytics (R)	November 9–11, 2017	575	± 4.1%	44%	48%	–	2%	6%
Change Research	November 9–11, 2017	1,855	–	44%	40%	–	3%	13%
Gravis Marketing	November 10, 2017	478	± 4.5%	48%	46%	–	–	6%
WT&S Consulting (R)	November 9, 2017	1,354	± 3.5%	50%	39%	–	–	11%
Opinion Savvy	November 9, 2017	515	± 4.3%	46%	46%	–	4%	4%
	November 9, 2017	Moore sexual misconduct allegations reported						
NRSC (R)	November 6–7, 2017	–	–	51%	42%	–	–	8%
Strategy Research	November 6, 2017	2,200	± 2.0%	51%	40%	–	–	9%
Axis Research (R-SLF)	October 24–26, 2017	503	± 4.5%	56%	39%	–	–	5%
Strategy Research	October 19, 2017	3,000	± 3.0%	52%	41%	–	–	7%
Strategy Research	October 16, 2017	3,000	± 2.5%	51%	40%	–	–	9%
Fox News	October 14–16, 2017	801	± 3.5%	42%	42%	–	3%	11%
NRSC (R)	October 3–5, 2017	–	–	53%	37%	–	–	10%
Cygnal (R)	October 2–5, 2017	497	± 4.4%	49%	41%	–	–	9%
JMC Analytics (R)	September 30 – October 1, 2017	500	± 4.4%	48%	40%	–	1%	11%
Opinion Savvy	September 27–28, 2017	590	± 4.0%	50%	45%	–	–	5%
Emerson College	September 21–23, 2017	519	± 4.3%	52%	30%	–	–	18%
Emerson College	September 8–9, 2017	416	± 4.8%	44%	40%	–	–	16%

* Unpublished poll released on December 15

Hypothetical polling

with Roy Moore on ballot and Luther Strange as write-in candidate:

Poll source	Date(s) administered	Sample size	Margin of error	Roy Moore (R)	Doug Jones (D)	Luther Strange (R)	Other	Undecided
Opinion Savvy	November 9, 2017	515	± 4.3%	41%	44%	12%	1%	2%

with Luther Strange on ballot:

Poll source	Date(s) administered	Sample size	Margin of error	Luther Strange (R)	Doug Jones (D)	Other	Undecided
Fox News	November 13–15, 2017	649 LV	± 3.5%	38%	48%	3%	5%
Fox News	November 13–15, 2017	823 RV	± 3.0%	39%	46%	3%	6%
Emerson College	September 21–23, 2017	519	± 4.3%	49%	36%	–	15%
Emerson College	September 8–9, 2017	416	± 4.8%	43%	40%	–	17%

with generic Republican/Democrat

Poll source	Date(s) administered	Sample size	Margin of error	Generic Republican	Generic Democrat	Undecided
Washington Post/Schar School	November 27–30, 2017	739	± 4.5%	50%	44%	6%
JMC Analytics (R)	November 27–28, 2017	650	± 3.8%	49%	46%	3%
JMC Analytics (R)	November 9–11, 2017	575	± 4.1%	45%	47%	8%
JMC Analytics (R)	September 30 – October 1, 2017	500	± 4.4%	49%	45%	6%

== Results ==
Turnout map by county 25–30% 30–35% 35–40% 40–45% 45–50% 50–55%

At 9:23 p.m. CST on December 12, 2017, the Associated Press called the election for Jones; however, Moore refused to concede. Jones was the first Democratic candidate to win a statewide election in Alabama since former lieutenant governor Lucy Baxley was elected president of the Alabama Public Service Commission in 2008. Jones was sworn into office on January 3, 2018, becoming the first Democratic U.S. senator from Alabama since Howell Heflin left office in 1997.

2017 United States Senate special election in Alabama
Party	Candidate	Votes	%
Democratic	Doug Jones	673,896	49.97%
Republican	Roy Moore	651,972	48.34%
Write-in		22,852	1.69%
Total votes		1,348,720	100.00%
Democratic gain from Republican			

=== By county ===
County	Roy Moore Republican		Doug Jones Democratic		Write-in Various		Margin		Total
County	#	%	#	%	#	%	#	%	Total
Autauga	8,762	59.89%	5,615	38.38%	253	1.73%	-3,147	-21.51%	14,630
Baldwin	38,566	61.68%	22,261	35.60%	1,703	2.72%	-16,305	-26.08%	62,530
Barbour	2,702	41.83%	3,716	57.53%	41	0.63%	1,014	15.70%	6,459
Bibb	3,599	68.79%	1,567	29.95%	66	1.26%	-2,032	-38.84%	5,232
Blount	11,631	81.80%	2,408	16.94%	180	1.27%	-9,223	-64.86%	14,219
Bullock	656	19.42%	2,715	80.37%	7	0.21%	2,059	60.95%	3,378
Butler	2,758	48.27%	2,915	51.02%	41	0.72%	157	2.75%	5,714
Calhoun	15,238	54.43%	12,331	44.04%	429	1.53%	-2,907	-10.38%	27,998
Chambers	3,312	43.37%	4,257	55.75%	67	0.88%	945	12.38%	7,636
Cherokee	4,006	70.98%	1,529	27.09%	109	1.93%	-2,477	-43.89%	5,644
Chilton	7,563	75.62%	2,306	23.06%	132	1.32%	-5,257	-52.56%	10,001
Choctaw	1,949	45.93%	2,277	53.66%	17	0.40%	328	7.73%	4,243
Clarke	3,995	47.55%	4,363	51.93%	43	0.51%	368	4.38%	8,401
Clay	2,589	71.96%	990	27.52%	19	0.53%	-1,599	-44.44%	3,598
Cleburne	2,468	79.66%	600	19.37%	30	0.97%	-1,868	-60.30%	3,098
Coffee	8,063	67.22%	3,730	31.10%	202	1.68%	-4,333	-36.12%	11,995
Colbert	7,771	52.43%	6,881	46.42%	171	1.15%	-890	-6.00%	14,823
Conecuh	1,815	44.35%	2,259	55.21%	18	0.44%	444	10.85%	4,092
Coosa	1,867	56.37%	1,415	42.72%	30	0.91%	-452	-13.65%	3,312
Covington	6,835	75.69%	2,107	23.33%	88	0.97%	-4,728	-52.36%	9,030
Crenshaw	2,347	63.04%	1,320	35.46%	56	1.50%	-1,027	-27.59%	3,723
Cullman	16,609	78.74%	4,161	19.73%	324	1.54%	-12,448	-59.01%	21,094
Dale	6,991	63.72%	3,844	35.04%	136	1.24%	-3,147	-28.68%	10,971
Dallas	3,487	24.82%	10,503	74.75%	60	0.43%	7,016	49.94%	14,050
DeKalb	10,097	72.69%	3,559	25.62%	234	1.68%	-6,538	-47.07%	13,890
Elmore	14,415	64.17%	7,711	34.33%	338	1.50%	-6,704	-29.84%	22,464
Escambia	4,987	57.22%	3,642	41.79%	87	1.00%	-1,345	-15.43%	8,716
Etowah	15,730	58.44%	10,568	39.26%	620	2.30%	-5,162	-19.18%	26,918
Fayette	3,491	74.53%	1,143	24.40%	50	1.07%	-2,348	-50.13%	4,684
Franklin	4,216	69.86%	1,771	29.35%	48	0.80%	-2,445	-40.51%	6,035
Geneva	5,433	79.71%	1,290	18.93%	93	1.36%	-4,143	-60.78%	6,816
Greene	462	12.11%	3,345	87.66%	9	0.24%	2,883	75.55%	3,816
Hale	1,691	30.06%	3,902	69.37%	32	0.57%	2,211	39.31%	5,625
Henry	3,015	60.88%	1,899	38.35%	38	0.77%	-1,116	-22.54%	4,952
Houston	14,846	61.02%	9,198	37.81%	285	1.17%	-5,648	-23.22%	24,329
Jackson	7,317	67.74%	3,330	30.83%	154	1.43%	-3,987	-36.91%	10,801
Jefferson	66,350	30.18%	149,759	68.13%	3,716	1.69%	83,409	37.94%	219,825
Lamar	2,847	77.89%	779	21.31%	29	0.79%	-2,068	-56.58%	3,655
Lauderdale	12,818	55.31%	9,970	43.02%	388	1.67%	-2,848	-12.29%	23,176
Lawrence	5,321	63.23%	3,033	36.04%	61	0.72%	-2,288	-27.19%	8,415
Lee	14,059	40.61%	19,886	57.44%	674	1.95%	5,827	16.83%	34,619
Limestone	14,339	58.49%	9,660	39.41%	515	2.10%	-4,679	-19.09%	24,514
Lowndes	988	20.65%	3,783	79.08%	13	0.27%	2,795	58.42%	4,784
Macon	759	11.57%	5,783	88.13%	20	0.30%	5,024	76.56%	6,562
Madison	46,381	40.04%	65,997	56.98%	3,447	2.98%	19,616	16.94%	115,825
Marengo	2,805	38.09%	4,498	61.07%	62	0.84%	1,693	22.99%	7,365
Marion	5,269	79.26%	1,311	19.72%	68	1.02%	-3,958	-59.54%	6,648
Marshall	13,842	71.21%	5,145	26.47%	450	2.32%	-8,697	-44.74%	19,437
Mobile	46,828	42.15%	62,716	56.46%	1,546	1.39%	15,888	14.30%	111,090
Monroe	3,280	49.80%	3,266	49.59%	40	0.61%	-14	-0.21%	6,586
Montgomery	17,739	26.53%	48,374	72.35%	745	1.11%	30,635	45.82%	66,858
Morgan	19,215	62.34%	10,935	35.48%	671	2.18%	-8,280	-26.86%	30,821
Perry	821	20.67%	3,140	79.05%	11	0.28%	2,319	58.38%	3,972
Pickens	2,965	48.81%	3,064	50.44%	46	0.76%	99	1.63%	6,075
Pike	4,165	50.32%	4,015	48.51%	97	1.17%	-150	-1.81%	8,277
Randolph	3,231	65.29%	1,695	34.25%	23	0.46%	-1,536	-31.04%	4,949
Russell	3,622	34.70%	6,761	64.77%	55	0.53%	3,139	30.07%	10,438
Shelby	36,455	55.67%	27,311	41.71%	1,718	2.62%	-9,144	-13.96%	65,484
St. Clair	15,889	70.43%	6,212	27.54%	459	2.03%	-9,677	-42.89%	22,560
Sumter	814	18.65%	3,533	80.94%	18	0.41%	2,719	62.29%	4,365
Talladega	9,701	48.75%	9,977	50.13%	223	1.12%	276	1.39%	19,901
Tallapoosa	7,179	60.16%	4,605	38.59%	150	1.26%	-2,574	-21.57%	11,934
Tuscaloosa	22,067	40.91%	30,869	57.23%	1,007	1.87%	8,802	16.32%	53,943
Walker	11,938	72.23%	4,330	26.20%	259	1.57%	-7,608	-46.03%	16,527
Washington	3,325	64.21%	1,805	34.86%	48	0.93%	-1,520	-29.35%	5,178
Wilcox	1,000	22.93%	3,345	76.70%	16	0.37%	2,345	53.77%	4,361
Winston	4,681	82.72%	911	16.10%	67	1.18%	-3,770	-66.62%	5,659
Totals	651,972	48.34%	673,896	49.97%	22,852	1.69%	21,924	1.63%	1,348,720

Counties that flipped from Republican to Democratic

- Barbour (largest city: Eufaula)
- Butler (largest city: Greenville)
- Chambers (largest city: Valley)
- Choctaw (largest town: Butler)
- Clarke (largest city: Jackson)
- Conecuh (largest city: Evergreen)
- Lee (largest city: Auburn)
- Madison (largest city: Huntsville)
- Mobile (largest city: Mobile)
- Pickens (largest city: Aliceville)
- Talladega (largest city: Talladega)
- Tuscaloosa (largest city: Tuscaloosa)
- Jefferson (largest municipality: Birmingham)
- Marengo (largest municipality: Linden)
- Sumter (largest municipality: Livingston)
- Greene (largest municipality: Eutaw)
- Hale (largest municipality: Moundville)
- Perry (largest municipality: Marion)
- Dallas (largest municipality: Selma)
- Wilcox (largest municipality: Camden)
- Lowndes (largest municipality: Fort Deposit)
- Montgomery (largest municipality: Montgomery)
- Macon (largest municipality: Tuskegee)
- Bullock (largest municipality: Union Springs)
- Russell (largest city: Phenix City)

=== By congressional district ===
Despite losing the state, Moore won six of seven congressional districts. However, he only won one district by a double-digit margin.

District	Moore	Jones	Representative
1st	50%	48%	Bradley Byrne
2nd	53%	45%	Martha Roby
3rd	51%	48%	Mike Rogers
4th	68%	30%	Robert Aderholt
5th	48.8%	48.7%	Mo Brooks
6th	53%	45%	Gary Palmer
7th	20%	79%	Terri Sewell

== Analysis ==
External videos
- Doug Jones election night remarks, December 12, 2017, C-SPAN
- Roy Moore election night remarks, December 12, 2017, C-SPAN

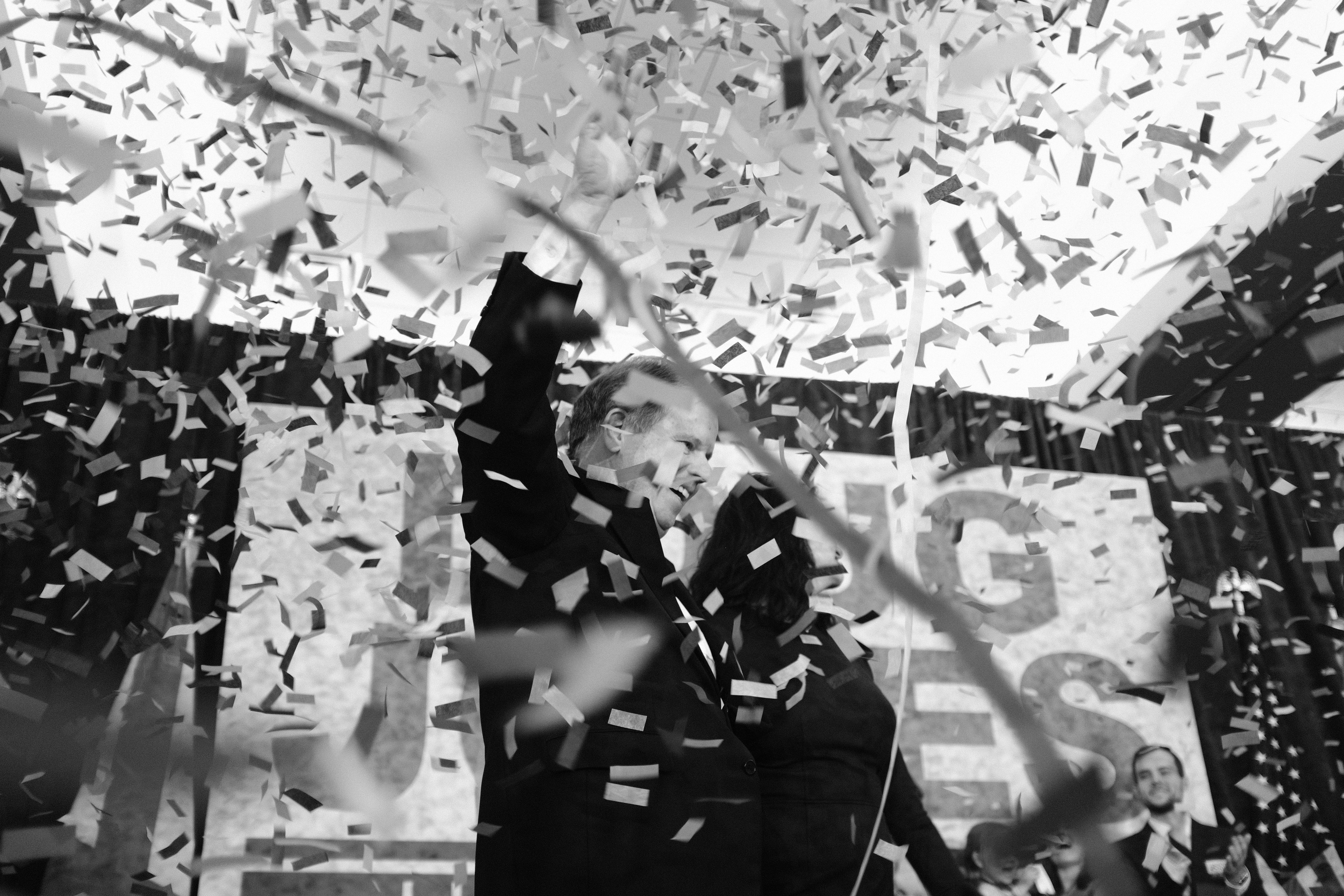
Jones on stage following his victory

Write-in votes by county: <1% >1% >2% >3%

Doug Jones defeated Roy Moore by a margin of 21,924 votes. Voter turnout was 40.54% of Alabama's 3,326,812 registered voters. Jones won primarily by running up huge margins in the state's major cities, as well as winning 96% of African American voters. He also won a strong majority of voters with graduate degrees (58–39%), and came close to winning White women with college degrees in Alabama (45-52%). The state's four largest counties—Jefferson (home to the state's largest city of Birmingham), Mobile (home to Mobile), Madison (home to Huntsville), and Montgomery (home to the state capital of Montgomery)—all gave Jones 56 percent or more of the vote. He carried Jefferson by over 83,800 votes, and Montgomery by almost 30,500 votes; either county would have been more than enough to give him the victory. Jones also dominated the Black Belt. Jones won 61% of votes from voters under 45, and 51% of independent voters. While Moore dominated the state's rural areas outside of the Black Belt, he significantly underperformed Trump's totals in those areas, as well as the suburbs such as traditional GOP fortress Shelby County, which Moore won by a small margin.

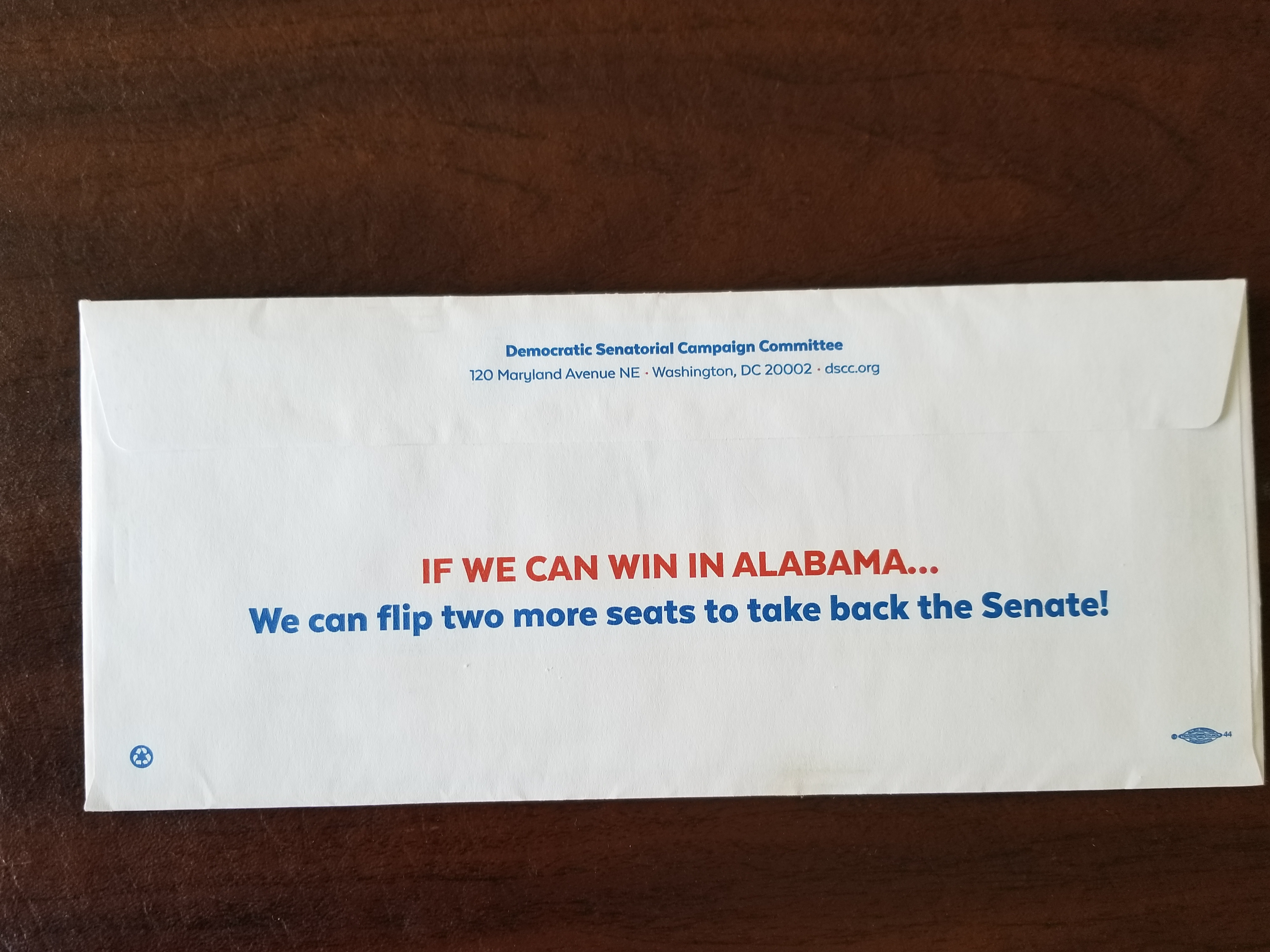
An envelope to a Democratic Senatorial Campaign Committee fundraising mailer distributed in 2018 with a reference to Jones' victory in the traditionally strongly Republican state of Alabama

As of December 15, Moore demanded a recount and refused to concede the race, despite being urged by Trump, Bannon, and others to concede. In Alabama, if the final margin of victory is less than 0.5%, then a recount is automatically triggered. If not, then either candidate can request a recount at their own expense. However, Alabama Secretary of State John Merrill estimated that a recount could cost anywhere from $1 million to $1.5 million, an amount that would have had to be paid in full when the request is made. Moore had only $636,046 on hand by the time the campaign ended. A number of right-leaning websites pushed conspiracy theories about voter fraud providing the margin for Jones. Merrill noted on December 20 that the only outstanding ballots were 366 military ballots and 4,967 provisional ballots; even if all those votes were for Moore, it would not have been enough to trigger an automatic recount.

Because the number of write-in votes was larger than Jones' margin of victory, the names written in were both counted and listed. Luther Strange, who lost the Republican primary to Moore, received the most write-in votes, followed by former White House aide Lee Busby, U.S. Rep. Mo Brooks, who also ran in the Republican Senate primary, Libertarian write-in candidate Ron Bishop, and Attorney General Jeff Sessions. Nick Saban, head coach for University of Alabama's football team, finished in seventh with more than 250 votes.

After the election, Moore filed a lawsuit attempting to block the state from certifying the election and calling for an investigation into voter fraud. On December 28, 2017, a judge dismissed this lawsuit and state officials certified the election results, officially declaring Doug Jones the winner. Jones was sworn into office on January 3, 2018, by Vice President Mike Pence. Jones became the first Democrat to win a statewide race in Alabama since former lieutenant governor Lucy Baxley was elected president of the Alabama Public Service Commission in 2008 over Republican Twinkle Andress Cavanaugh. Prior to that, Democrat Jim Folsom Jr. was elected Lieutenant Governor of Alabama in 2006 over Republican Luther Strange. The last Democrat to win a federal statewide election in Alabama was Richard Shelby in 1992, who switched to the Republican Party in late 1994.

=== Voter demographics ===
CNN exit poll
Demographic subgroup	Jones	Moore	% of voters
Gender
Men	42	56	49
Women	57	41	51
Age
18–24 years old	59	40	8
25–29 years old	62	35	5
30–39 years old	66	32	12
40–49 years old	53	46	20
50–64 years old	46	53	32
65 and older	40	59	23
Race
White	30	68	66
Black	96	4	29
Race by gender
White men	26	72	35
White women	34	63	31
Black men	93	6	11
Black women	98	2	17
Education
High school or less	44	56	20
Some college education	46	50	36
College degree	52	46	28
Advanced degree	58	39	16
Education by race and gender
White men without college degrees	19	79	19
White women without college degrees	25	73	17
White men with college degrees	35	62	16
White women with college degrees	45	52	14
Non-white	88	11	34
Party ID
Democrats	98	2	37
Republicans	8	91	43
Independents	51	43	21
Ideology
Liberals	86	14	23
Moderates	74	25	31
Conservatives	15	83	45
Children under 18 in your home?
Yes	56	42	35
No	49	50	65
Are sexual misconduct allegations against Moore:
Definitely True	97	2	26
Probably True	82	15	26
Probably False	3	95	27
Definitely False	7	93	15
When did you decide your vote?
Last few days	38	57	12
Earlier in December	47	50	9
In November	53	46	21
Before November	53	46	57
Area type
Urban	85	14	20
Suburban	47	51	38
Rural	36	62	42
Source: CNN

== See also ==
- 2010 United States Senate special election in Massachusetts
- 2016 United States Senate elections
