= C. C. Torbert Jr. =

American judge

Chief Justice of the Alabama Supreme Court
- In office January 17, 1977 – 1989
- Preceded by: Howell Heflin
- Succeeded by: Ernest C. Hornsby

Personal details
- Born: Clement Clay Torbert Jr. August 31, 1929 Opelika, Alabama, U.S.
- Died: June 2, 2018 (aged 88) Opelika, Alabama, U.S.
- Education: United States Naval Academy; Auburn University; University of Maryland; University of Alabama
- Occupation: lawyer, politician, judge

Clement Clay "Bo" Torbert Jr. (August 31, 1929 – June 2, 2018) was an American jurist. He was the twenty-fifth Chief Justice of the Alabama Supreme Court from 1977 through 1989.

Torbert was born in Lee County, Alabama, the son of Clement Clay Torbert Jr. and Lynda H. Meadows, and the grandson of Clement Clay Torbert Sr. and Aylmerine Spearman Floyd. Clement Clay Sr. was from Society Hill, where his grandfather, James Torbert, served as the first postmaster.

Torbert attended the United States Naval Academy and Auburn University, receiving a bachelor's degree from Auburn in 1951. He attended law school at the University of Maryland and the University of Alabama. After entering private law practice in Opelika in 1954, he was elected to the Alabama House of Representatives in 1958. In 1966 and 1974, he was elected to the Alabama Senate for the 17th and 22nd districts respectively.

In 1976, Torbert was elected Chief Justice of the Alabama Supreme Court. He took office on January 17, 1977, and was re-elected to a second term in 1982. He retired as chief justice in 1989.

The Heflin-Torbert Judicial Building, the Alabama Judicial Building in Montgomery, Alabama, is named jointly for U.S. Senator Howell Heflin and former Justice C.C. Torbert.

He died on June 2, 2018, at his home, at the age of 88.

== Sources ==
- Alabama Department of Archives and History. Alabama Supreme Court Chief Justices: Clement Clay "Bo" Torbert Jr.. Accessed April 22, 2007.
- Alabama Dept. of Archives and History. Alabama Official and Statistical Register, 1979.

Legal offices
Preceded by Howell Heflin	Chief Justice of the Supreme Court of Alabama; 1977–1989	Succeeded by Ernest C. Hornsby
