= Gadsden Mall =

- Location: Gadsden, Alabama, United States
- Coordinates: 33°59′44.12″N 86°0′26″W
- Opened: July 31, 1974
- Developer: Colonial Properties
- Manager: Summit Properties USA
- Owner: Summit Properties USA
- Num. of stores: 70+
- Num. of anchor tenants: 3
- Floor area: 502,591 square feet (46,692.2 m^{2})
- Floors: 1
- Website: shopgadsdenmall.com

The Gadsden Mall is a regional 502,591-square-foot (46,692.2 m^{2}) shopping mall on U.S. Route 411 (Rainbow Drive) in Gadsden, Alabama. Located at the interchange of Interstate 759 and U.S. Route 411, it is in the southern section of the city. It is anchored by Belk, Martin's Family Clothing and Food City.

== History ==
The site of the mall was historically known as the flats near Barrel Springs.

Site preparation for the mall, the first mall in Etowah County, began in September 1972, and construction started in March 1973. Developed by Colonial Properties, the mall opened on July 31, 1974. Sears and Belk Hudson opened as anchors at the mall, leaving their downtown locations, as did some other downtown merchants.

In the early 2000's, its name was changed to The Colonial Mall.

JCPenney had a store in the mall from 1991-2001, and returned in 2008 in a new anchor location created as part of a remodeling of the mall. On March 17, 2017, it was announced that JCPenney would be closing as part of a plan to close 138 stores nationwide. The store closed on July 31, 2017.

On October 15, 2018, it was announced that Sears would also be closing as part of a plan to close 142 stores nationwide which left Belk as the only anchor left.

On January 24, 2024, supermarket chain Food City opened in the mall’s former Sears location.

== Roy Moore ==
In November 2017, the mall became the subject of many news reports regarding U.S. Senate candidate Roy Moore who used to frequent the mall in the early 1980s and would approach teenage females for dates, leading to locals claiming that Moore had been "banned" from the mall. However, no formal ban has been proven.
