= Roy Moore sexual misconduct allegations =

2017 accusations against American jurist and politician

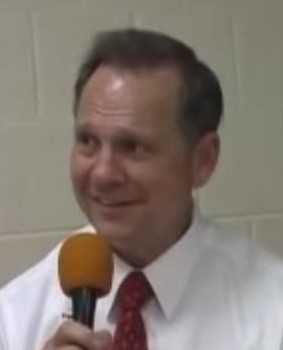
Roy Moore in 2011

In November 2017, multiple women made allegations of sexual misconduct against Roy Moore, a former chief justice of the Alabama Supreme Court and the Republican nominee in the U.S. Senate special election scheduled for the following month. Three women alleged that he had sexually assaulted them, two of whom were minors at the time while Moore was then in his 30s. Six other women recalled Moore pursuing romantic relationships or engaging in inappropriate or unwanted behavior with them while they were between the ages of 14 and 22. Moore denied the allegations of sexual assault. On November 10, he acknowledged having known two of the women. Two weeks later, he said that he did "not know any of these women", and he "did not date any of these women" and had "not engaged in any sexual misconduct with anyone".

Prominent Republicans such as John McCain, Mitt Romney, Paul Ryan, and Mitch McConnell called for Moore to drop out of the race after the allegations were reported. When these allegations were reported, it was too late for Moore's name to be removed from the ballot.

President Donald Trump, however, endorsed Moore and accepted his denials. Alabama Republicans largely defended Moore. The Republican National Committee initially cut ties with Moore after the allegations were reported but later restored funding to his campaign. Moore lost the Senate special election to Democratic candidate Doug Jones in what was considered an upset in the deeply Republican state. In the year following the allegations, no criminal charges were issued against Moore and the issue lost public attention.

One of the accusers, Leigh Corfman, filed a defamation lawsuit against Moore in January 2018 because he had said that her accusation was "false and malicious". Moore filed a defamation suit against Corfman and four others in April 2018. On August 13, 2022, Roy Moore was awarded $8.2 million in a defamation lawsuit against the Democratic-aligned Senate Majority PAC by a jury trial. However, on April 24, 2026, the 11th U.S. Circuit Court of Appeals vacated the judgment in Moore's favor and directed the trial court to enter judgment for the Senate Majority PAC.

== Allegations of sexual assault ==
=== Leigh Corfman ===
On November 9, 2017, The Washington Post reported that Leigh Corfman alleged that Moore had initiated a sexual encounter with her in 1979, when she was 14 and he was 32 years old. Corfman said that Moore had met her and her mother when they were on business at the county courthouse. At the time he was in his 30s and working as an assistant district attorney. He offered to sit with Corfman in the hallway while her mother went into a courtroom to testify. Corfman said that during that time, he asked for her phone number, which she gave him. They later went on two dates: each time he picked her up around the corner from her house and drove her to his house. The first time he "told her how pretty she was and kissed her". On a second date, Moore allegedly "took off her shirt and pants and removed his clothes ... touched her over her bra and underpants ... and guided her hand to touch him over his underwear". Corfman states that she did not feel comfortable with the situation and asked Moore to take her home, which he did.

Such sexual contact between Moore and a 14-year-old would have been a felony under Alabama law, and punishable by up to ten years in prison. In a November 2017 Today Show interview, Corfman said she is proud that telling her story has encouraged others to do the same.

In January 2018, Corfman filed a defamation lawsuit against Moore and against his Senate campaign, because he had said that her accusation was "false and malicious". In April 2018, Moore filed a defamation suit against Corfman and four others. In August 2021, an Alabama judge dismissed Corfman's lawsuit against his Senate campaign, ruling that she did not prove that Moore's campaign staff or volunteers had knowingly made false statements or acted with reckless disregard for the truth. In February 2022, a jury found neither side defamed the other.

=== Beverly Young Nelson ===
Following the report about Corfman in The Washington Post, Beverly Young Nelson, appearing with lawyer Gloria Allred, said she had received unwanted attention from Moore when she was 15 years old. Further, she said that in December 1977 or January 1978, when she was 16, Moore sexually assaulted her. Nelson said that she had accepted Moore's offer of a car ride after she finished work, trusting him "because he was the District Attorney". Nelson said, "Instead of driving to the street, he stopped the car, he parked his car in between the dumpster and the back of the restaurant, where there were no lights." Then "Mr. Moore reached over and began groping me and put his hand on my breast. I tried to get out and he reached over and locked (the door) and I yelled and told him to stop." She said Moore put his hand on her neck and tried to force her head down on his crotch. According to Nelson, Moore eventually gave up, telling her, "You're just a child, I'm the district attorney; if you tell anyone about this no one will ever believe you."

As evidence of her relationship with Moore, Nelson provided her high school yearbook, which included an entry by Moore, written about a week before the alleged assault. Moore's entry reads: "To a sweeter more beautiful girl I could not say Merry Christmas. Christmas 1977. Love, Roy Moore, D.A." Moore's attorney requested that the yearbook be turned over to a "handwriting expert". In early December 2017, Nelson said that she had added the words "D.A. 12-22-77 Olde Hickory House" after this entry in the yearbook. Her attorney Allred said she had had a handwriting expert verify Moore's signature as genuine.

Allred said that she and Nelson would welcome an independent expert to view the message, so long as it was accompanied by a US Senate hearing. She repeated their request for Moore to testify about the incident under oath.

Nelson said that she had no further contact with Moore after the incident. After her accusations were reported, Phillip Jauregui, an attorney associated with Moore's campaign, disputed Nelson's allegations. He said that in 1999 Nelson did have contact with Moore, as he was the judge in her divorce proceedings that year. But ThinkProgress and WHNT-TV in Huntsville reported that a different judge handled the initial matters in Nelson's 1999 divorce proceeding. The case was dismissed later that year, before any hearing would have been held before Moore, as Nelson and her husband attempted to reconcile. Moore's only contact with the Nelson case was to have his assistant, Delbra Adams, stamp his signature on a motion to dismiss the case in August. According to ThinkProgress, there was no reason for Moore or Nelson to have encountered each other during the case. Nelson's lawyer in the 1999 case told WHNT that his review of his files showed no record of any hearing before Moore.

Moore's defenders said that the Olde Hickory House restaurant was not operating in 1977; Moore's wife posted such a denial on Facebook. But contemporary records document that it did exist in 1978, although they do not document that it actually existed, as Olde Hickory House, in 1977.

=== Tina Johnson ===
Tina Johnson said she encountered Moore when she was 28, and that he grabbed her buttocks while she was in his law office to sign documents transferring custody of her son to her mother in 1991. Johnson also said that Moore had commented on her looks, making her feel uncomfortable.

=== Attempt to plant false report in The Washington Post ===
On November 27, 2017, The Washington Post reported that a woman had approached them with a claim that Moore impregnated her at the age of 15 in 1992, and that she had an abortion afterward. Post staff became suspicious after their fact-checking found that some of her statements were inconsistent or false. The woman was later seen at the New York office of Project Veritas, an organization that targets and attempts to entrap the mainstream news media and left-leaning groups. Also, Post reporters discovered a GoFundMe page on which someone with the same name as the woman said, "I've accepted a job to work in the conservative media movement to combat the lies and deceipt [sic] of the liberal MSM." The Post concluded, and reported, that the woman had been part of an undercover sting operation intended to discredit the paper by getting it to publish a false report.

In 2018, the Post was awarded the Pulitzer Prize for Investigative Reporting for its coverage of the allegations against Moore, including its exposé of the unsuccessful Project Veritas sting.

== Allegations of sexual harassment ==
=== Becky Gray ===
Becky Gray said she was 22 and working in the men's department of Pizitz in the Gadsden Mall in 1977 when Moore "started coming up to" her. He repeatedly asked her out and she repeatedly rejected his dating offers. She said she "thought he was 'old'". Gray complained to her store manager after becoming disturbed by Moore's advances.

=== Alleged mall ban ===
Phyllis Smith, who worked at the Gadsden Mall, said that she had seen Moore talking to other young clerks, although he did not approach her. She said, "I can remember him walking in and the whole mood would change with us girls ... It would be like we were on guard ... I remember being creeped out." Smith warned others to "watch out for this guy".

On November 13, The New Yorker quoted multiple local former police officers and mall employees who had heard that Roy Moore had been banned from the Gadsden Mall in the early 1980s for attempting to pick up teenage girls. An Alabama woman said that Moore was banned from the mall in the late 1970s after she reported to her manager that he was sexually harassing her. Local news channel WBRC interviewed Barnes Boyle, a manager of the mall from 1981 to 1998, who said that, to his knowledge, Moore was not banned. The Moore campaign produced two other witnesses, a longtime mall employee and the Operations Manager overseeing mall security, both of whom said that he was never banned from the mall.

Faye Gray, a retired detective, said that she had heard that Moore had been banned from the Gadsden Mall, and that she and fellow officers were told to ensure "that he didn't hang around the cheerleaders."

== Other assertions about dating history ==
=== Gena Richardson ===
In November 2017, Gena Richardson, a registered Republican, was reported as saying that Moore had started pursuing her when she was a senior in high school, near her 18th birthday. Richardson stated that Moore approached her when she was working in Sears at the Gadsden Mall and asked for her phone number. According to Richardson, after she refused to give Moore her number, Moore called her at her high school to ask her out on a date. Richardson said that she eventually did agree to a date and, when she started to get out of his car, "he grabbed [her] and pulled [her] in and ... kissed [her]." Richardson said the kiss scared her and described it as "a man kiss — like really deep tongue. Like very forceful tongue. It was a surprise." Richardson's account was corroborated by classmate and Sears co-worker Kayla McLaughlin.

=== Other women ===
Debbie Wesson Gibson has asserted that she and Moore dated in the spring of 1981, when she was 17 and Moore was 34. After Moore denied the relationship, she provided a signed postcard from Moore congratulating her on her graduation from high school.

Gloria Thacker Deason says that she dated the then 32-year-old Moore for several months when she was 18 in 1979, after having met him at the Gadsden Mall. She said that during their dates, he provided bottles of Mateus Rosé wine and tropical cocktails, although the legal drinking age in Alabama at the time was 19.

Kelly Harrison Thorp claimed that Moore asked her on a date in 1982, when she was 17 years of age. She declined. According to Thorp, Moore told her that he dated young women her age "all the time". Thorp has said that she knows Corfman and believes her allegations.

Wendy Miller has said that Moore asked her on dates while she was working at Gadsden Mall as a Santa's helper. Moore first asked her out when she was 14 years old. Her mother would not allow them to date because of Moore's age.

=== Reputation ===
A former colleague who worked with Moore at the Etowah County District Attorney's office from 1982 to 1985 stated, "It was common knowledge that Roy dated high school girls, everyone we knew thought it was weird [...] We wondered why someone his age would hang out at high school football games and the mall". At least four current and former residents of Etowah County have corroborated the colleague's story. One said, "These stories have been going around this town for 30 years ... Nobody could believe they hadn't come out yet". Another said,

"Him liking and dating young girls was never a secret in Gadsden when we were all in high school ... In our neighborhoods up by Noccalula Falls we heard it all the time. Even people at the courthouse know it was a well-known secret ... It's just sad how these girls [who accused Moore] are getting hammered and called liars, especially Leigh [Corfman]."

Retired detective Faye Gray, a 37-year veteran of the Gadsden police force, said that in the 1980s, she was told to look out for Roy Moore due to his known harassment of cheerleaders at local school athletic events. The detective said that both in the police department and at the Gadsden courthouse, there were frequent mentions of Moore liking young girls. Gray said, "I didn't realize until sometime later that when they said he liked young girls, I just thought he liked young ladies, you know, maybe in their 20s. I had no idea, or we had no idea, that we were talking about 14-year-olds."

== Lawsuit against Democrats ==
On August 13, 2022, Roy Moore was awarded $8.2 million in a defamation lawsuit against the Democratic-aligned Senate Majority PAC by a jury trial. However, on April 24, 2026, the 11th U.S. Circuit Court of Appeals vacated the judgment in Moore's favor and directed the trial court to enter judgment for the Senate Majority PAC.

== Reactions ==
=== Moore and his campaign ===
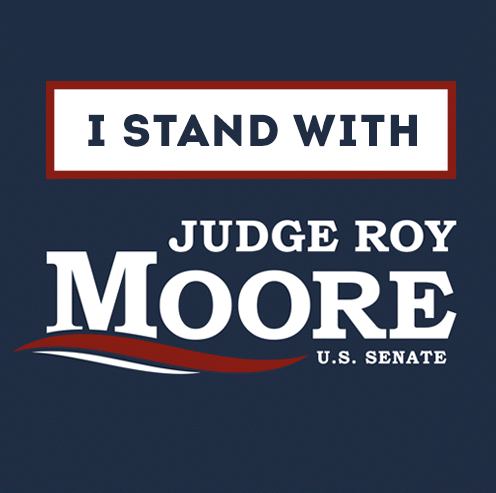
"I Stand With Roy Moore" logo made to support Moore's candidacy despite allegations.

On November 10, Moore responded to the initial allegations by Corfman, Miller, Gibson, and Deason in an interview with Sean Hannity on Fox News Radio. Moore called these initial allegations "completely false, false and misleading", adding, "I have a special concern for protection of young ladies", and also, "You understand this is 40 years ago, and after my return from the military, I dated a lot of young ladies."

When Hannity asked about Corfman, Moore said, "I never talked to her, never had any contact with her ... Allegations of sexual misconduct with her are completely false. I believe they are politically motivated ... I've never known this woman [Corfman] or anything with regard to the other girls." In that same interview, Moore addressed Gibson,

"I do not remember speaking to a civics class [that Gibson was in] ... I can't recall the specific dates [between him and Gibson] because that's been 40 years but I remember her as a good girl ... I knew her as a friend. If we did go out on dates then we did. But I do not remember that." Regarding Deason, Moore said, "As I recall, she was 19 or older ... I never provided alcohol, beer or intoxicating liquor to a minor ... I seem to remember her as a good girl."

When Hannity asked if Moore at aged 32 had dated girls in their late teens, Moore answered, "Not generally, no. If I did, you know, I'm not going to dispute anything but I don't remember anything like that ... I don't remember ever dating any girl without the permission of her mother." Instead, Moore attributed the allegations to "Democrat and maybe even the established Republican efforts to undermine" his Senate campaign.

After a new accusation by Nelson was reported, Moore said that it was "absolutely false ... I never did what she said I did. I don't even know the woman. I don't know anything about her."

Moore's campaign issued a statement: "If you are a liberal and hate Judge Moore, apparently he groped you ... If you are a conservative and love Judge Moore, you know these allegations are a political farce." Moore's campaign also attacked the credibility of Moore's accusers, while refusing to answer questions.

On November 15, Moore posted an open letter to Sean Hannity in which he wrote, "I adamantly deny the allegations of Leigh Corfman and Beverly Nelson, did not date underage girls, and have taken steps to begin a civil action for defamation." He also emphasized how long ago the alleged incidents occurred and expressed his belief that the Nelson yearbook had been tampered with.

On November 27, Moore conducted his first public campaigning since the allegations arose. Regarding the allegations, Moore declared, "This is simply dirty politics. It's a sign of the immorality of our times".

Also on November 27 and on November 29, Moore issued a full denial of knowing any of his accusers, contradicting his November 10 statements on knowing Debbie Wesson Gibson and Gloria Thacker Deason. Moore stated: "I do not know any of these women, did not date any of these women and have not engaged in any sexual misconduct with anyone."

A CBS News poll conducted a few weeks prior to the December 12, 2017, election for the Alabama State Senate revealed that "71 percent of Alabama Republicans say the allegations against Roy Moore are false", and that the Democrats and media were behind the charges. While the CBS poll showed Moore leading the election, a Washington Post poll showed his opponent, Doug Jones, in the lead, and that voters "consider Jones to have higher standards of moral conduct than Moore".

==== Moore's polygraph ====
In December 2017, Moore underwent a polygraph test, which is not permitted as evidence in court. Moore claimed: "the results of the examination reflected that I did not know, nor had I ever had sexual contact with any of these individuals". In June 2019, Lexi Corfman's lawyers put forth an affidavit by Barry Colvert, an FBI interrogator with a long experience with polygraphs. Colvert stated that Moore's polygraph "results indicate that Mr. Moore was being deceptive when asked the relevant questions concerning Ms. Corfman" due to "consistently elevated electrodermal and cardiovascular responses following questions concerning Ms. Corfman".

==== Breitbart News ====
Conservative news website Breitbart News strongly supported Moore's campaign throughout, attacked his critics and defended him from the allegations. Editor-in-chief Alex Marlow revealed after the election that he actually believed Corfman's allegations to be true. He said that an important factor in their support was the fear that the media was setting a standard for sexual misconduct that President Donald Trump would be unable to meet, "based off [sic] not any sort of conviction or any sort of admission of guilt, but based off of [sic] purely allegations."

=== Republican politicians and groups ===
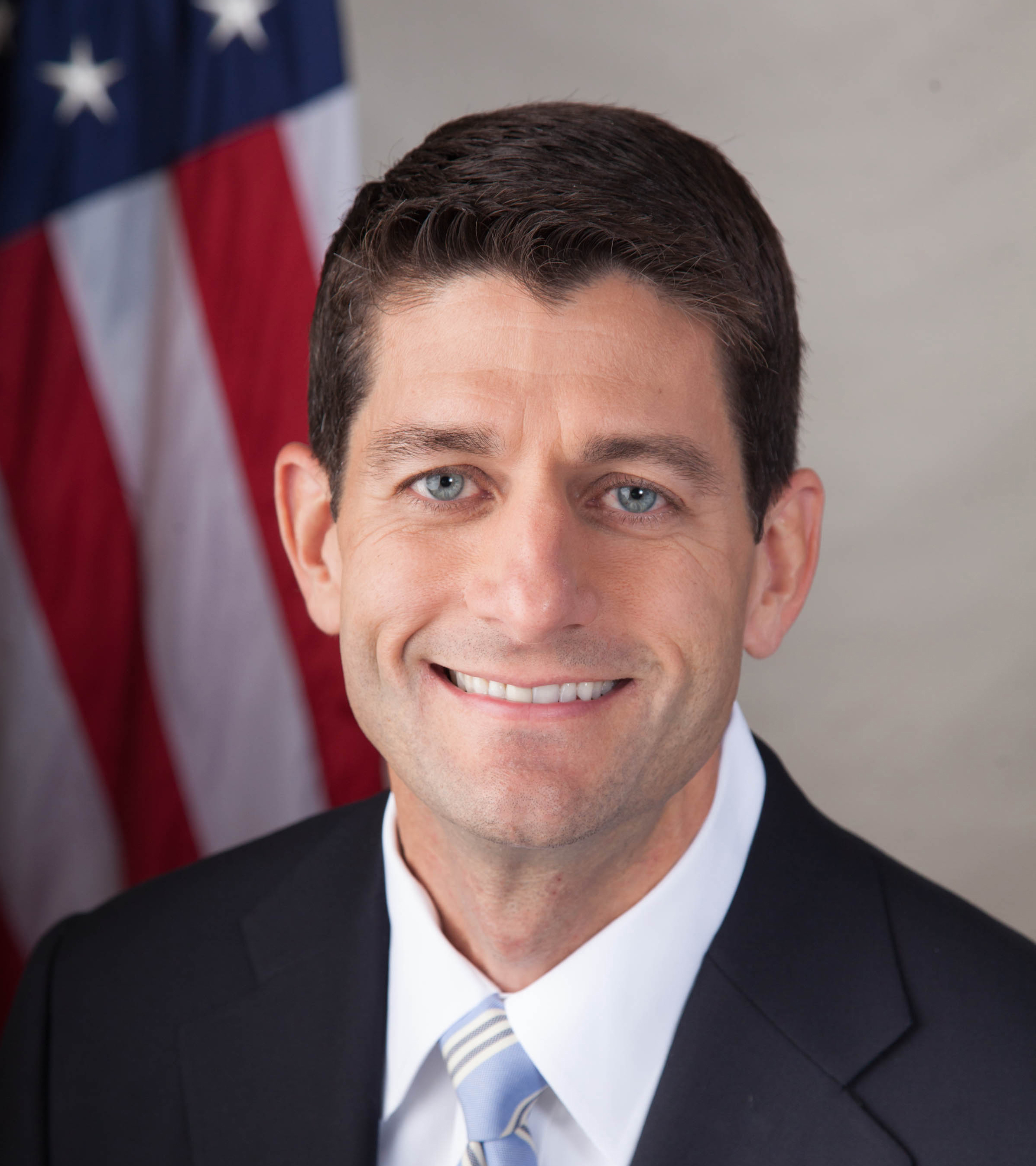
Speaker of the U.S. House of Representatives Paul Ryan was among the Republican leaders who called for Moore to abandon his campaign.

Several Republican leaders said that Moore should step aside if the allegations were true. Prominent Republicans such as John McCain and Mitt Romney called for Moore to drop out of the race after the allegations were reported. Republican U.S. Senators Mike Lee, Steve Daines, Bill Cassidy, and Ted Cruz withdrew their endorsements of Moore's Senate candidacy and National Republican Senatorial Committee chair and Colorado senator Cory Gardner suggested that, due to the allegations, Moore should be expelled from the Senate if he wins the election. The National Republican Senatorial Committee ended its joint fundraising arrangement with Moore, although the Republican National Committee continued its arrangement with him. Days later, Senate Majority Leader Mitch McConnell announced that he believes the women who made the accusations and that Moore should "step aside". Speaker of the House Paul Ryan also called for Moore to abandon his campaign.

The White House initially said that President Donald Trump "believes that these allegations are very troubling" and that Moore should drop out of the race if they are true. Later on November 21, however, Trump defended Moore, saying, "He totally denies it ... He says it didn't happen. You have to listen to him also." Trump also criticized Moore's opponent in the Senate race, Doug Jones, and commented, "We don't need a liberal person in [the Senate], a Democrat, Jones". White House Press Secretary Sarah Huckabee Sanders said, "The president wants people in the House and Senate who support his agenda." Trump aide Kellyanne Conway, when asked about Moore, alluded that it was more important to vote for Moore even if he were guilty of the alleged sexual offences, stating "I'm telling you we want the votes in the Senate to get this tax bill through."

On November 26, Trump continued his attacks on Jones via Twitter ("Jones would be a disaster!"), while also declaring, "Can't let [Democrats] Schumer/Pelosi win this race". On December 4, Trump fully endorsed Moore, and extended his support in a telephone call to the candidate.

Alabama Republicans, including Governor Kay Ivey, have largely defended Moore from these accusations. An exception was Richard Shelby, Alabama's senior U.S. Senator, who said the accusations against Moore "are believable", adding "Alabama deserves better." He earlier indicated that he had written in the name of another Republican on his absentee ballot. No significant Republican organization in the state dropped their support for Moore, except the Young Republican Federation of Alabama.

Alabama state Auditor Jim Zeigler defended Moore's alleged sex crime actions on biblical grounds, and Alabama State representative Ed Henry went so far as advocating the prosecution of Moore's accusers criminally.

Marion County Republican chair David Hall said that the accusations were irrelevant, presumably because the alleged crimes happened "40 years ago". Bibb County Republican chair Jerry Pow said that he would support Roy Moore even if he committed a sex crime because he "wouldn't want to vote for Doug" Jones, the Democratic candidate. Covington County Republican party chairman William Blocker stated that he would still vote for Moore even if he had committed a sex crime. However, the chair in Geneva County, Riley Seibenhener said he would not support Moore if the allegations were true.

At the time of the revelations it was too late to remove Moore's name from the ballot. National Republican Party leaders considered various measures to try to oust Moore from the race in favor of another Republican candidate. One proposal was to ask Governor Kay Ivey to delay the special election until 2018. Ivey said that she had no plans to change the election date. Ivey also said she planned to vote for Moore because "we need to have a Republican in the United States Senate", even though she said she had "no reason to disbelieve any of" the allegations against Moore.

Some Republicans, including senators Lisa Murkowski and Orrin Hatch, floated the prospect of a write-in campaign to elect Luther Strange. However, Strange said it was "highly unlikely" that he would run a write-in campaign. Senate Majority Leader Mitch McConnell proposed Attorney General Jeff Sessions, who formerly held the Senate seat, as a write-in candidate. If Sessions had sought his old Senate seat, the post of U.S. Attorney General would become vacant.

=== Democratic politicians and groups ===
Following the reports, Moore's opponent, Democratic nominee Doug Jones, issued a statement saying, "Roy Moore needs to answer these serious charges." In a later statement made as another woman came forward, Jones said: "We applaud the courage of these women. Roy Moore will be held accountable by the people of Alabama for his actions." Jones' campaign ran television and radio ads featuring Republicans who oppose Moore and support Jones; in one ad, a man states "I'm a Republican, but Roy Moore — no way."

=== Religious community and leaders ===
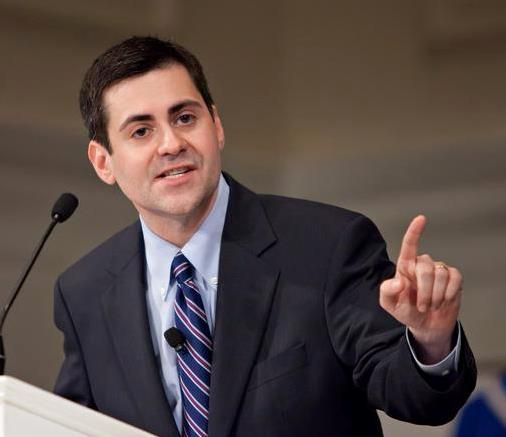
The president of the Southern Baptist Convention's Ethics and Religious Liberty Commission, Russell Moore, "saved some of his harshest criticism for ministers who [used] theological arguments to defend Roy Moore".

Following the reports of sexual misconduct, evangelical leader Franklin Graham defended Moore and attacked his critics, asserting that they were "guilty of doing much worse than what he has been accused of supposedly doing", a remark that prompted criticism of Graham. Alabama pastor Flip Benham defended Moore by saying that when Moore had returned from military service, many eligible women were already married, so Moore "looked" romantically for the "purity of a young woman". Many evangelical Christians continued to back Moore, citing his anti-abortion and anti-same-sex marriage positions. A survey of evangelical likely voters in Alabama conducted in the immediate aftermath of the reports found that 37% of evangelicals surveyed said the allegations make them more likely to vote for Moore and 34% said the allegations make no difference; only 28% saying the allegations made them less likely to vote for Moore.

By contrast, other faith leaders criticized Moore. Ed Stetzer, executive director of the Billy Graham Center for Evangelism, published a November 2017 article in Christianity Today asserting that the allegations against Moore were "'credible'" and calling on Moore to end his Senate campaign. Stetzer added, "'If Moore continues to maintain his innocence, he should still step down so he can fight to clear his name, for the good of his state, for the success of his party, and to end the embarrassment he is causing evangelicals'". Russell Moore, president of the Ethics & Religious Liberty Commission (the public policy arm of the Southern Baptist Convention), "took to Twitter to denounce evangelicals who gave [Moore] a pass". The Rev. William Barber II called [Roy] Moore's Christian rhetoric "unbearable hypocrisy" and criticized religious leaders who maintained their support for him, writing: "This is not Christianity. Rather, it is an extreme Republican religionism that stands by party and regressive policy no matter what. It's not the gospel of Christ, but a gospel of greed. It is the religion of racism and lies, not the religion of redemption and love." A group of 300 American faith leaders issued a statement saying: "As a person of faith, I wholeheartedly believe the courageous women who have shared their stories of being sexually preyed upon and assaulted by Alabama Republican Senate candidate Roy Moore as teenage girls. These profound moral failings and crimes render Judge Moore unfit to serve in the U.S. Senate." A separate letter was signed by 59 Christian ministers, mostly from mainline Protestant denominations, who wrote that "Even before the recent allegations of sexual abuse, Roy Moore demonstrated that he was not fit for office." William S. Brewbaker III, an evangelical Christian and professor at the University of Alabama School of Law, wrote that support for Moore was indicative of "the sorry state of evangelical Christianity". Based on Christian beliefs, Brewbaker concluded that it was "wrong to attack one's critics, as Mr. Moore did recently on Twitter, as 'the forces of evil' and attribute their questions about serious allegations to 'a spiritual battle'".

== See also ==
- 2017 United States political sexual scandals
- 2017 United States Senate special election in Alabama
- Me Too movement
