= Ed Henry (Alabama politician) =

American politician (born 1970)

Member of the Alabama House of Representatives from the 9th district
- In office November 3, 2010 – November 3, 2018
- Preceded by: Ronald Grantland
- Succeeded by: Scott Stadthagen

Personal details
- Born: July 30, 1970 (age 55) Hartselle, Alabama, U.S.
- Party: Republican
- Spouse: Wendi Brown
- Children: 2
- Education: Midwestern State University (BS)
- Website: Official website

William "Ed" Henry (born July 30, 1970) is an American politician who was a Republican member of the Alabama House of Representatives. He represents the 9th district, which includes portions of Morgan, Cullman and Marshall counties.

== Early life ==
Henry attended Hartselle High School. He spent two years at Auburn University before completing his bachelor's degree in radiological sciences at Midwestern State University in Wichita Falls, Texas.

== Political career ==
=== 1998–2015 ===
Henry became involved in politics when he worked for the campaign of Alabama State Representative Mike Ball in 1998 and again in 2002. In the 2008 presidential election, he helped lead the Morgan County chapter of Huck PAC, supporting the candidacy of Mike Huckabee. In the 2010 election, he was a candidate for the 9th state legislative district and defeated the Democratic Party nominee.

As a member of the state House, Henry supported anti-abortion legislation. At a 2012 anti-abortion rally, he acknowledged that in 1991 he had accompanied his pregnant girlfriend to have an abortion. He said that he regretted the decision and that it was a "very significant scar that I have on my soul".

=== 2016–2019 ===
In 2016, Henry was the state co-chair of Donald Trump's presidential campaign and a Trump delegate to the Republican National Convention.

In 2016, Henry said that he would file a resolution calling for the impeachment of Republican Governor Robert J. Bentley over his alleged misuse of state funds.

In 2017, he sought to remove Alabama House Majority Leader Republican Micky Hammon from his leadership position, citing what he called Hammon's "'watered-down' agenda" for the legislative session and "grave" concerns about Hammon's business dealings.

In April 2017, Henry declared his candidacy for the 2017 special election for the U.S. Senate seat vacated by Jeff Sessions. At the time, he was one of four candidates, the others being former Alabama Attorney General Luther Strange, who was appointed to the seat by Bentley; Roy Moore, the former chief justice of the Alabama Supreme Court who resigned from the bench after being suspended from his post for judicial ethics violations; and Randy Brinson, former state chair of the Christian Coalition. In May 2017, Henry dropped out of the race and harshly criticized Strange, alleging corruption and claiming that Strange had escaped impeachment from the office of attorney general through his appointment to the Senate. Henry then endorsed Mo Brooks's candidacy.

In November 2017, Henry defended Roy Moore after Moore was accused of making sexual advances on four teenage girls when in his 30s. Henry called for the accusers to be prosecuted, on the grounds that "[i]f they believe [Moore] is predatory, they are guilty of allowing him to exist for 40 years". In an interview, Henry called Moore the "victim" with respect to the allegations.

=== Indictment ===
In May 2018, Henry was indicted for allegedly engaging in a conspiracy with a Montgomery doctor, Gilberto Sanchez, to defraud Medicare. The superseding indictment filed in July 2018 alleges he engaged in similar conspiracies with Dr. Punuru Reddy of Decatur and Dr. Nicole Scruggs of Huntsville. Henry pleaded guilty to the charge of government property theft.

He was sentenced to two years probation and fined $4,000.

=== Pardon ===
Henry was pardoned by President Trump on his last day in office on January 20, 2021.
