= Ernest C. Hornsby =

American judge

Ernest C. Hornsby, also known as Sonny Hornsby (born October 8, 1936), was chief justice of the Supreme Court of Alabama from 1989 to 1995.

== Biography ==
He was born on October 8, 1936, and he received his A.B. degree from Auburn University and his J.D. from the University of Alabama School of Law in 1960. From 1960 to 1988, He had a private law practice in Tallassee, Alabama. He served as a state senator for the 10th district from 1962 to 1966. He served as president of the Elmore County Bar Association, president of the Alabama Trial Lawyers Association, and as Tallassee, Alabama City Judge from 1972 to 1978. From 1977 to 1978, he was president of the Alabama State Bar. He served as Chief Justice of the Supreme Court of Alabama from 1989 to 1995.

He was narrowly defeated for re-election in 1994 by Perry O. Hooper Sr., who became Alabama's third Republican chief justice and the first GOP member to hold the post in 120 years when Thomas Minott Peters (1872–1874) left office during Reconstruction.

== Personal life ==
Hornsby is married to Judy O’Daniel Hornsby. His grandson, Warner Hornsby, now practices law.

Legal offices
Preceded by C. C. Torbert Jr.	Chief Justice of the Supreme Court of Alabama; 1989–1995	Succeeded by Perry Hooper
