= Perry Hooper Sr. =

American judge

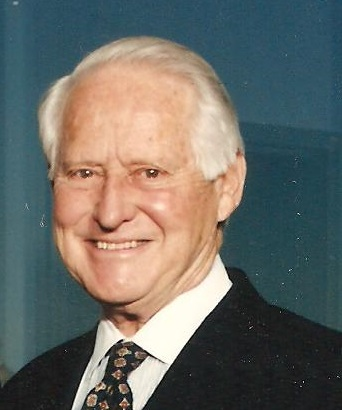
- Hooper in 1997

27th Chief Justice of the Alabama Supreme Court
- In office October 20, 1995 – January 15, 2001
- Preceded by: Ernest C. Hornsby
- Succeeded by: Roy Moore

Circuit Judge, Fifteenth Judicial Circuit in Montgomery County, Alabama
- In office 1974–1983

Montgomery County Probate Judge
- In office 1965–1974

Personal details
- Born: Perry Oliver Hooper; April 8, 1925 Birmingham, Alabama, U.S.
- Died: April 24, 2016 (aged 91) Montgomery, Alabama, U.S.
- Party: Republican
- Spouse: Marilyn Yost Hooper
- Children: 4, including Perry Hooper Jr.
- Parent(s): Ernest and Mary Lou Perry Hooper
- Education: Birmingham–Southern College; University of Alabama (JD)

Military service
- Branch/service: United States Marine Corps

Perry Oliver Hooper Sr. (April 8, 1925 – April 24, 2016) was an American jurist who served as the 27th chief justice of the Alabama Supreme Court from 1995 to 2001. He was the first Republican since Reconstruction to have been elected to his state's highest court.

== Background ==
With receipt of his Juris Doctor degree, he entered private practice.

Hooper was active in the Republican Party during the days when it barely existed in Alabama. In 1964, during the Barry Goldwater sweep of Alabama, Hooper was elected probate judge of Montgomery County, the first Republican to have been elected to that position since the 19th century. He continued as the probate judge, handling wills, successions, and estate transactions, until 1974, when was elected Judge of Alabama's 15th Judicial Circuit. In 1983, he returned to private practice.

== 1968 Senate election ==
In 1968, Hooper was the Republican nominee for the United States Senate for the open seat vacated by retiring Democrat Lister Hill. In the general election, Hooper received 201,277 votes (24 percent of the major party vote) to 638,774 (76 percent) for the Democratic nominee, former Lieutenant Governor James B. Allen, a conservative whose views were similar to those of Hooper. Still Hooper polled 54,304 more votes in his statewide race than did his party's presidential nominee, Richard M. Nixon. Hooper narrowly held his home county of Montgomery and fared best among upper-income whites, having received two thirds of the vote in higher socio-economic precincts in both Montgomery and Birmingham. Lower-income whites, conversely, supported Allen by a wide margin.

== Supreme Court election and service ==
In 1994, Hooper was narrowly elected chief justice of the Alabama Supreme Court, with a winning margin of just 262 votes. He was not sworn in until October 20, 1995, almost nine months after his term had begun. Allies of the sitting Democratic Chief Justice, Ernest C. Hornsby, challenged the result, seeking to count approximately 2,000 absentee ballots that were unwitnessed and unsigned. In September 1995, U.S. District Judge Alex T. Howard Jr. decided that they should not be counted. His decision was upheld by the 11th Circuit Court of Appeals and a stay granted by U.S. Supreme Court Justice Anthony Kennedy expired on October 14. The full court declined to hear the case on October 19, 1995, and Hooper was seated.

Hooper served as chief justice until his retirement in 2001, when he was succeeded by fellow Republican Roy Moore.

== Personal life ==
Perry Hooper Sr. lived in Montgomery with his wife. They have four children. Hooper's son, Perry O. Hooper Jr., also of Montgomery, is a Republican former member of the Alabama House of Representatives. The junior Hooper was the unsuccessful Republican nominee for the Alabama Public Service Commission in the general election held on November 7, 2006. George Wallace Jr., formerly a Democrat, vacated the PSC position and ran unsuccessfully in the Republican primary for lieutenant governor.

Hooper died at home on April 24, 2016. He was 91.

Party political offices
Preceded by James D. Martin	Republican nominee for U.S. Senator from Alabama (Class 3); 1968	Vacant Title next held by George W. Nichols
Legal offices
Preceded by Ernest C. Hornsby	Chief Justice of the Supreme Court of Alabama; 1995–2001	Succeeded by Roy Moore
