= David Cole (politician) =

American politician

Member of the Alabama House of Representatives from the 10th district
- In office November 9, 2022 – August 30, 2023
- Preceded by: Mike Ball
- Succeeded by: Marilyn Lands

Personal details
- Party: Republican

David Cole is an American politician from Alabama. He served in the Alabama House of Representatives for District 10 from 2022 to 2023. He was sentenced to 60 days in prison for electoral fraud, his bond was $2500.

== Career ==
Cole earned his bachelor's degree from Arkansas State University and a medical degree from the University of Arkansas College for Medical Sciences. He is a retired colonel in the United States Army. After Mike Ball announced that he would not run for reelection to the state house for District 10 in the 2022 elections, Cole announced his candidacy to succeed him. Cole won the seat.

== Conviction ==
In August 2023, Cole was arrested for voting at an unauthorized location. Cole had leased a 5-by-5-foot (1.5 m × 1.5 m) space in a friend's home for $5 per month in 2021, which he claimed was his residence and used to run and vote in District 10. Cole accepted a plea agreement for voter fraud that required him to resign from the state house. He was sentenced to 60 days in prison in October. Cole was succeeded by Democrat Marilyn Lands.

== Electoral history ==
2022 Alabama House of Representatives general election, 10th District
Party	Candidate	Votes	%
Republican	David Cole	7,581	51.59%
Democratic	Marilyn Lands	6,608	44.96%
Libertarian	Elijah Boyd	503	3.42%
Write-in		4	0.03%
Total votes		14,696	100
