= Society Hill, Alabama =

Unincorporated community in Alabama, United States

- Unincorporated community
- Location in Alabama Location in the United States
- Coordinates: 32°25′36″N 85°26′43″W
- Country: United States
- State: Alabama
- County: Macon
- Elevation: 469 ft (143 m)
- Time zone: UTC-6 (Central (CST))
  - Summer (DST): UTC-5 (CDT)
- Area code: 334
- GNIS feature ID: 155245

Society Hill is an unincorporated community in Macon County, Alabama, United States.

== History ==
The community is likely named after Society Hill, South Carolina. Society Hill was once home to the Society Hill High School.

A post office operated under the name Society Hill from 1837 to 1914.

James Torbert served as the first postmaster of Society Hill. Torbert's grandson, Clement Clay Torbert, was born in Society Hill but moved to Opelika to operate a store and bank. Clement Clay's grandson, C. C. Torbert Jr., served as the twenty-fifth Chief Justice of the Alabama Supreme Court from 1977 through 1989.
