= Lee Busby =

American politician, soldier and sculptor

Member of the Tuscaloosa City Council from the 4th district
- Incumbent
- Assumed office October 15, 2019
- Preceded by: Matt Calderone

Personal details
- Born: 1956 or 1957 Tuscaloosa, Alabama, U.S.
- Party: Republican
- Children: 4
- Education: University of Alabama

Lee Busby (born 1956 or 1957) is an American retired military officer, politician, businessman and sculptor. He has served on the city council of Tuscaloosa, Alabama, since 2019. He was previously a write-in candidate for the 2017 special election for U.S. Senate in Alabama.

== Military career ==
Busby was born and raised in Tuscaloosa, Alabama. He graduated from the University of Alabama and served in the United States Marine Corps. He served in Iraq and was vice chief of staff to General John F. Kelly, among other posts. In 2007, Busby was awarded the Legion of Merit in recognition of his work as deputy chief of staff for the Marine Corps Forces Europe, in Europe and Africa.

Busby retired in 2013 with the grade of colonel. As a defense contractor, he trained soldiers in Afghanistan.

== Sculpting ==
Before pursuing politics and after his retirement from the military, Busby took on a career in sculpting. He specializes in clay portraits of American soldiers killed in war. In 2021, Busby and Mark Davis co-founded the Alabama Fallen Warriors Project, a nonprofit organization with the aim of raising money to sculpt busts of every American military service member killed in active duty since the September 11 attacks.

== Political career ==
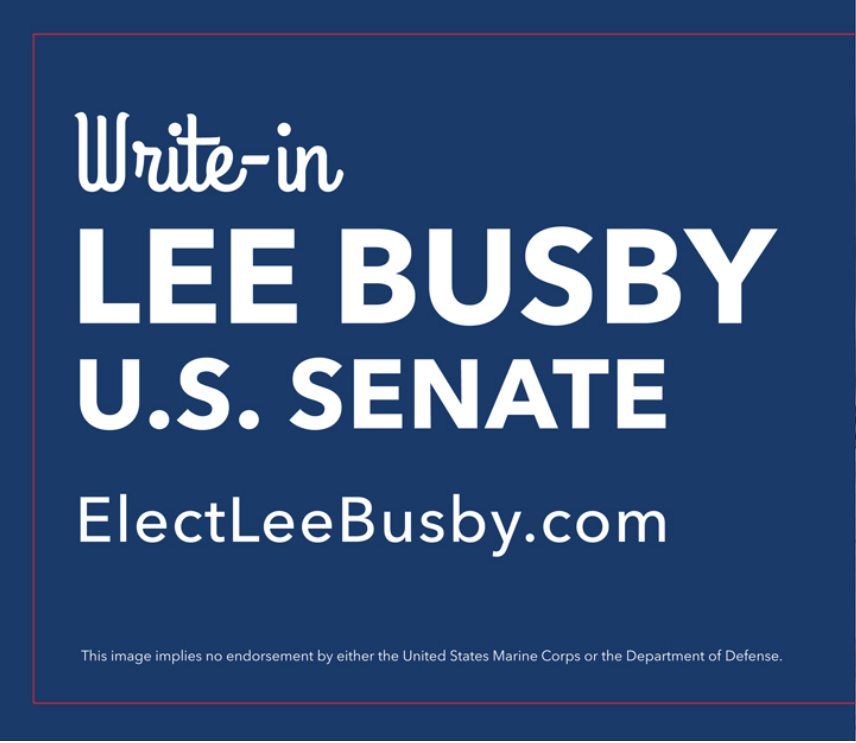
2017 write-in campaign poster

=== U.S. Senate write-in candidacy ===
On November 27, 2017, Busby announced a write-in candidacy for the 2017 United States Senate special election in Alabama, fifteen days prior to Election Day. Busby lost the election to Democrat Doug Jones. Busby and several other write-in candidates together received a total of 1.7% of votes.

=== Tuscaloosa city council ===
In October 2019, Busby was elected to the 4th district's seat on the city council of Tuscaloosa, Alabama, during a special election necessitated by a vacancy. He successfully ran for re-election unopposed in 2021. Busby described four areas of focus in his political career: "fiscal responsibility, safety [and] security, historical preservation and economic growth through new businesses." As of 2021, he serves as the chairman of the Finance Committee of Tuscaloosa.

In May 2021, Busby made a public call for ideas to resolve safety issues in Tuscaloosa's entertainment areas, which his district includes much of, in addition to the University of Alabama campus. In January 2022, Busby supported alcohol sales at Coleman Coliseum, citing potential tax revenue; the plan was later approved in a 6-1 decision. During city redistricting procedures that same year, Busby expressed hope that "we let go of the notion that people vote based on the color of their skin" the next time redistricting occurs.

Busby was reelected to another term on the city council, without opposition, in 2025.

=== Political positions ===
Busby is a registered Republican and described his political leanings as centrist. He opposes legal abortion under most circumstances, supports Republican tax proposals and repealing Obamacare, and voted for Donald Trump in the 2016 elections.

== Personal life ==
Busby is divorced and has four children.

== Electoral history ==
2019 Tuscaloosa City Council, District 4 election
| Party | Candidate | Votes | % |
|---|---|---|---|
| Nonpartisan | Lee Busby | 197 | 60.7% |
| Nonpartisan | Frank Fleming | 110 | 33.8% |
| Nonpartisan | John Earl | 18 | 5.5% |
| Total votes | | 325 | 100.0% |

2017 United States Senate special election in Alabama, general election results
| Party | Candidate | Votes | % |
|---|---|---|---|
| Democratic | Doug Jones | 673,896 | 50.0% |
| Republican | Roy Moore | 651,972 | 48.3% |
| Write-In | Write-ins (includes Busby) | 22,852 | 1.7% |
| Total votes | | 1,348,720 | 100.0% |
| Democratic gain from Republican | | | |
