= 1968 United States Senate election in Alabama =

- November 5, 1968
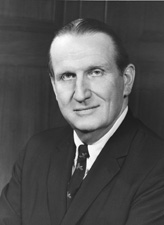

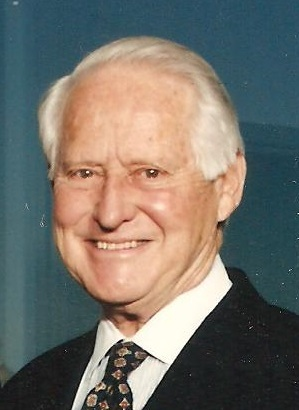

Nominee	James B. Allen	Perry O. Hooper Sr.	Robert P. Schwenn
Party	Democratic	Republican	NDPA
Popular vote	638,744	201,227	72,699
Percentage	69.99%	22.05%	7.97%
- Allen: 40–50% 50–60% 60–70% 70–80% 80–90% >90% Hooper: 40–50% Schwenn: 40–50% 50–60%
U.S. senator before election
J. Lister Hill
Democratic
Elected U.S. Senator
James B. Allen
Democratic

The 1968 United States Senate election in Alabama took place on November 5, 1968. Incumbent Democratic U.S. Senator J. Lister Hill retired. He was succeeded by Lieutenant Governor of Alabama James Allen, who won a hotly contested primary over Armistead I. Selden Jr. In the general election, Allen easily defeated Republican Probate Judge Perry O. Hooper Sr. and National Democratic nominee Robert Schwenn.

== Democratic primary ==
=== Candidates ===
- James B. Allen, Lieutenant Governor of Alabama
- John G. Crommelin, retired U.S. Navy Rear Admiral and white supremacist
- Jim Folsom, former Governor of Alabama
- Armistead I. Selden Jr., U.S. Representative from Greensboro
- Bob Smith, Huntsville attorney
- Margaret Stewart, genealogist and historian

=== Results ===
Democratic primary first round results by county Allen: 30–40%; 40–50%; 50–60%; 60–70%; 70–80%; Selden: 30–40%; 40–50%; 50–60%; 60–70%; Smith: 30–40%; 40–50%

1968 Democratic primary results
Party	Candidate	Votes	%
Democratic	James B. Allen	224,483	41.88%
Democratic	Armistead I. Selden Jr.	190,283	35.50%
Democratic	Bob Smith	72,928	13.61%
Democratic	Jim Folsom	32,004	5.97%
Democratic	John G. Crommelin	10,926	2.04%
Democratic	Margaret Stewart	5,368	1.00%
Total votes		535,992	100.00%

=== Run-off ===
Because no candidate received a majority in the first round, Allen and Selden advanced to a run-off election on June 4.

Democratic primary runoff results by county Allen: 50–60%; 60–70%; 70–80%; Selden: 50–60%; 60–70%

1968 Democratic run-off results
Party	Candidate	Votes	%
Democratic	James B. Allen	196,511	50.52%
Democratic	Armistead I. Selden Jr.	192,448	49.48%
Total votes		388,959	100.00%

== General election ==
1968 United States Senate election in Alabama
Party	Candidate	Votes	%	±%
Democratic	James B. Allen	638,774	69.99%	▲19.13
Republican	Perry O. Hooper Sr.	201,227	22.05%	▼27.09
NDPA	Robert P. Schwenn	72,699	7.97%	N/A
Total votes		912,700	100.00%	
Democratic hold				

== General election results by county ==
1968 United States Senate election in Alabama by county
County	James Browning Allen Democratic		Perry Oliver Hooper senior Republican		Robert P. Schwenn National Democratic		Margin		Total votes cast
County	#	%	#	%	#	%	#	%	Total votes cast
Autauga	4,368	60.84%	1,629	22.69%	1,183	16.48%	2,739	38.15%	7,180
Baldwin	13,111	80.60%	3,030	18.63%	125	0.77%	10,081	61.98%	16,266
Barbour	5,451	75.23%	496	6.85%	1,299	17.93%	4,152 (Note: In this county where Hooper ran third behind both Allen and Schwenn, margin given is Allen vote minus Schwenn vote and percentage margin Allen percentage minus Schwenn percentage.)	57.30%	7,246
Bibb	3,609	80.11%	314	6.97%	582	12.92%	3,027	67.19%	4,505
Blount	5,914	72.84%	2,182	26.88%	23	0.28%	3,732	45.97%	8,119
Bullock	1,914	47.47%	518	12.85%	1,600	39.68%	314	7.79%	4,032
Butler	3,558	60.92%	2,069	35.43%	213	3.65%	1,489	25.50%	5,840
Calhoun	20,377	79.46%	3,347	13.05%	1,921	7.49%	17,030	66.41%	25,645
Chambers	7,953	85.80%	1,091	11.77%	225	2.43%	6,862	74.03%	9,269
Cherokee	4,743	92.85%	318	6.23%	47	0.92%	4,425	86.63%	5,108
Chilton	5,154	62.52%	2,743	33.27%	347	4.21%	2,411	29.25%	8,244
Choctaw	3,742	94.26%	181	4.56%	47	1.18%	3,561	89.70%	3,970
Clarke	5,139	85.54%	760	12.65%	109	1.81%	4,379	72.89%	6,008
Clay	4,013	84.61%	689	14.53%	41	0.86%	3,324	70.08%	4,743
Cleburne	3,440	87.33%	484	12.29%	15	0.38%	2,956	75.04%	3,939
Coffee	8,620	87.19%	1,077	10.89%	189	1.91%	7,543	76.30%	9,886
Colbert	11,112	76.78%	2,060	14.23%	1,300	8.98%	9,052	62.55%	14,472
Conecuh	3,529	85.55%	544	13.19%	52	1.26%	2,985	72.36%	4,125
Coosa	2,661	73.53%	492	13.59%	466	12.88%	2,169	59.93%	3,619
Covington	8,825	74.33%	2,871	24.18%	176	1.48%	5,954	50.15%	11,872
Crenshaw	3,668	74.92%	949	19.38%	279	5.70%	2,719	55.54%	4,896
Cullman	11,134	67.60%	5,225	31.72%	111	0.67%	5,909	35.88%	16,470
Dale	7,861	86.07%	941	10.30%	331	3.62%	6,920	75.77%	9,133
Dallas	7,507	57.07%	2,444	18.58%	3,202	24.34%	4,305	32.73%	13,153
DeKalb	8,998	62.66%	5,340	37.18%	23	0.16%	3,658	25.47%	14,361
Elmore	7,552	72.07%	2,284	21.80%	643	6.14%	5,268	50.27%	10,479
Escambia	8,110	88.82%	956	10.47%	65	0.71%	7,154	78.35%	9,131
Etowah	23,759	79.69%	4,425	14.84%	1,629	5.46%	19,334	64.85%	29,813
Fayette	4,757	85.30%	792	14.20%	28	0.50%	3,965	71.10%	5,577
Franklin	5,734	67.32%	2,579	30.28%	205	2.41%	3,155	37.04%	8,518
Geneva	7,798	92.07%	406	4.79%	266	3.14%	7,392	87.27%	8,470
Greene	1,544	40.04%	181	4.69%	2,131	55.26%	-587	-15.22%	3,856
Hale	2,765	53.94%	418	8.15%	1,943	37.90%	822	16.04%	5,126
Henry	4,003	84.86%	157	3.33%	557	11.81%	3,446	73.05%	4,717
Houston	14,815	89.46%	1,396	8.43%	350	2.11%	13,419	81.03%	16,561
Jackson	8,327	87.08%	1,086	11.36%	150	1.57%	7,241	75.72%	9,563
Jefferson	94,603	59.26%	53,094	33.26%	11,943	7.48%	41,509	26.00%	159,640
Lamar	5,263	92.72%	334	5.88%	79	1.39%	4,929	86.84%	5,676
Lauderdale	12,421	74.89%	3,414	20.58%	750	4.52%	9,007	54.31%	16,585
Lawrence	5,632	86.58%	692	10.64%	181	2.78%	4,940	75.94%	6,505
Lee	7,975	68.54%	2,442	20.99%	1,219	10.48%	5,533	47.55%	11,636
Limestone	7,888	82.64%	1,207	12.65%	450	4.71%	6,681	69.99%	9,545
Lowndes	1,463	53.14%	618	22.45%	672	24.41%	791	28.73%	2,753
Macon	1,599	33.89%	482	10.22%	2,637	55.89%	-1,038	-22.00%	4,718
Madison	27,249	55.97%	16,699	34.30%	4,741	9.74%	10,550	21.67%	48,689
Marengo	4,886	55.43%	674	7.65%	3,254	36.92%	1,632	18.52%	8,814
Marion	6,534	80.28%	1,567	19.25%	38	0.47%	4,967	61.03%	8,139
Marshall	12,686	80.38%	2,933	18.58%	163	1.03%	9,753	61.80%	15,782
Mobile	53,656	74.85%	16,473	22.98%	1,556	2.17%	37,183	51.87%	71,685
Monroe	4,842	84.22%	561	9.76%	346	6.02%	4,281	74.47%	5,749
Montgomery	15,815	36.89%	18,598	43.39%	8,452	19.72%	-2,783	-6.49%	42,865
Morgan	15,353	79.52%	3,600	18.65%	353	1.83%	11,753	60.88%	19,306
Perry	2,557	46.84%	580	10.62%	2,322	42.54%	235	4.30%	5,459
Pickens	4,379	75.40%	341	5.87%	1,088	18.73%	3,291	56.66%	5,808
Pike	4,570	62.37%	1,785	24.36%	972	13.27%	2,785	38.01%	7,327
Randolph	5,176	83.78%	789	12.77%	213	3.45%	4,387	71.01%	6,178
Russell	7,850	92.20%	543	6.38%	121	1.42%	7,307	85.82%	8,514
Shelby	7,287	74.64%	2,142	21.94%	334	3.42%	5,145	52.70%	9,763
St. Clair	6,893	75.68%	1,849	20.30%	366	4.02%	5,044	55.38%	9,108
Sumter	2,165	45.95%	277	5.88%	2,270	48.17%	-105	-2.23%	4,712
Talladega	13,649	85.48%	1,744	10.92%	574	3.59%	11,905	74.56%	15,967
Tallapoosa	8,695	79.87%	1,605	14.74%	587	5.39%	7,090	65.12%	10,887
Tuscaloosa	18,530	70.05%	3,801	14.37%	4,121	15.58%	14,409	54.47%	26,452
Walker	14,542	83.63%	2,779	15.98%	67	0.39%	11,763	67.65%	17,388
Washington	4,022	89.36%	318	7.07%	161	3.58%	3,704	82.29%	4,501
Wilcox	2,012	58.68%	639	18.64%	778	22.69%	1,234	35.99%	3,429
Winston	3,017	57.93%	2,173	41.72%	18	0.35%	844	16.21%	5,208
Totals	638,774	69.99%	201,227	22.05%	72,699	7.97%	437,547	47.94%	912,700

== See also ==
- 1968 United States Senate elections
