= Ronald Grantland =

American politician

Member of the Alabama House of Representatives from the 9th district
- In office November 4, 1998 – November 3, 2010
- Succeeded by: Ed Henry

Personal details
- Born: March 11, 1947 (age 79) Hartselle, Alabama
- Party: Democratic

Ronald Grantland (born March 11, 1947) is an American politician who served in the Alabama House of Representatives from the 9th district from 1998 to 2010.
