= Marilyn Lands =

American politician

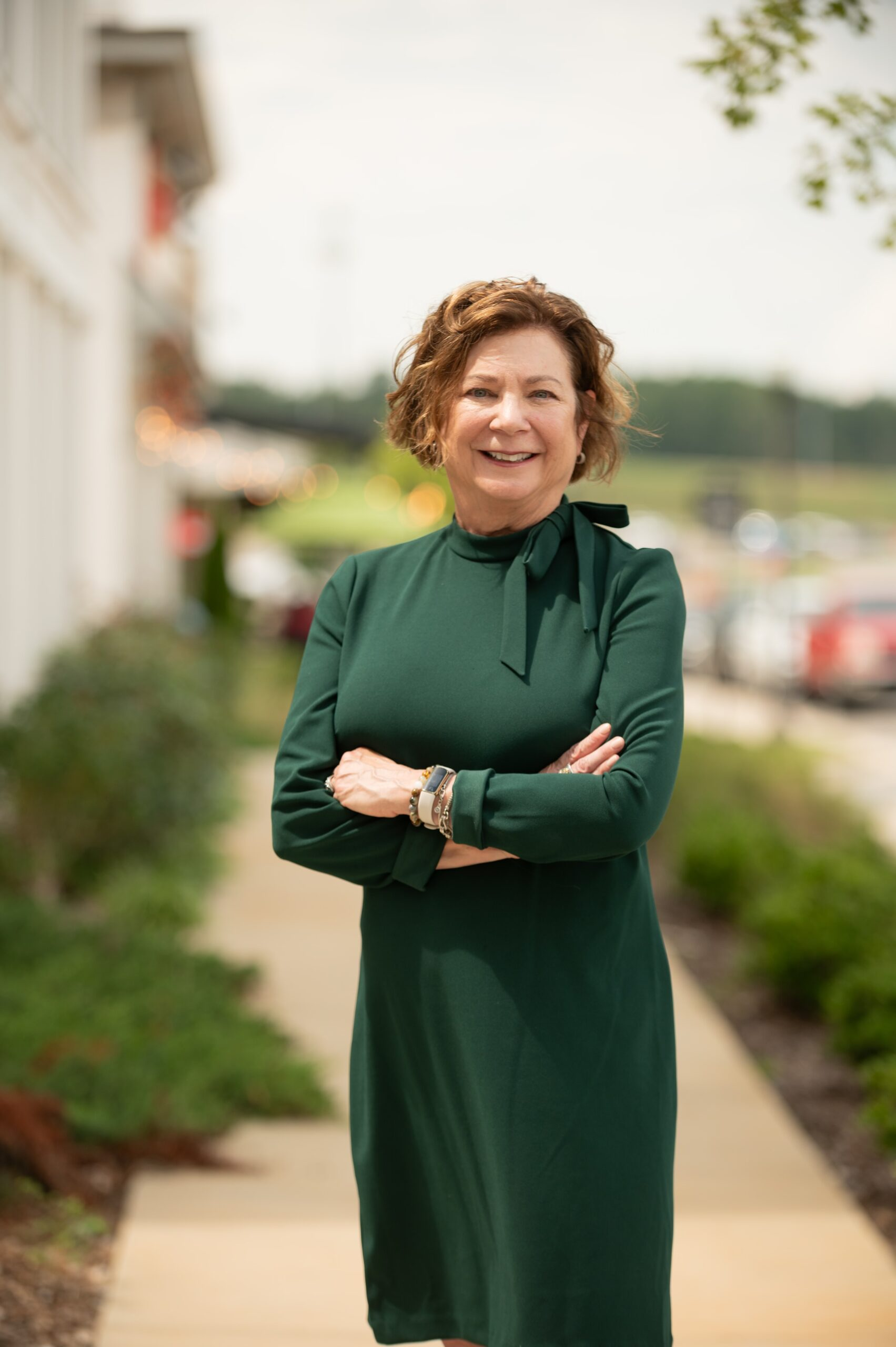

Member of the Alabama House of Representatives from the 10th district
- Incumbent
- Assumed office March 27, 2024
- Preceded by: David Cole

Personal details
- Party: Democratic
- Occupation: Professional counselor

Marilyn Lands is an American politician who currently serves as a Democratic member of the Alabama House of Representatives, representing District 10 in Huntsville. She was elected in a March 2024 special election to succeed Republican David Cole, who resigned after being jailed for electoral fraud.

== Alabama House of Representatives ==
A Democrat, she was first elected to her seat on March 26, 2024, with over 62 percent of the vote to replace David Cole, a Republican, who resigned his seat after being sentenced to 60 days in jail for electoral fraud. Notably, Cole won his last election with 51 percent of the vote, resulting in over a 17-point swing in favor of the Democrats.

Lands based her campaign on reproductive rights, opposing Alabama's ban on abortion, as well as supporting in vitro fertilization (IVF) in the aftermath of LePage v. Center for Reproductive Medicine. She was endorsed by Planned Parenthood in the election. According to AL.com, "The race drew national interest against the backdrop of the controversial Alabama State Supreme Court ruling that frozen embryos are considered children under state law."

== Electoral history ==
2022 Alabama House of Representatives general election, 10th District
Party	Candidate	Votes	%
Republican	David Cole	7,581	51.59%
Democratic	Marilyn Lands	6,608	44.96%
Libertarian	Elijah Boyd	503	3.42%
Write-in		4	0.03%
Total votes		14,696	100

2024 Alabama House of Representatives special election, 10th District
Party	Candidate	Votes	%
Democratic	Marilyn Lands	3,715	62.3%
Republican	Teddy Powell	2,236	37.5%
Write-in		11	0.2%
Total votes		5,962	100
Democratic gain from Republican			
