= Mike Ball =

American politician

Mike A. Ball

Member of the Alabama House of Representatives from the 10th district
- In office November 6, 2002 – November 10, 2022
- Preceded by: James C. Haney
- Succeeded by: David Cole

Personal details
- Born: September 17, 1954 (age 72) Stockton, California
- Party: Independent (2023–present); Republican (until 2023)

Military service
- Allegiance: United States of America
- Branch/service: United States Marine Corps
- Years of service: 1973–1977
- Rank: Sergeant

Michel A. Ball (born September 17, 1954) is an American politician who was a member of the Alabama House of Representatives, representing its 10th district from 2002 to 2022.

== Biography ==
Ball was born in Stockton, California where he lived until 1963 with his sister Linda and his mother who was unable to care for the children. Because of their mother's chronic severe mental illness, he and his sister were placed in foster care until California authorities arranged for the children to live with their father Leldon Ball, who operated a sawmill in Hartselle, Alabama. At 9 years old, Ball met his father for the first time when he and his sister arrived at the Birmingham, Alabama airport.

His father immediately began instilling into his son the value of service, faith, respect for others, and humility; as well as the love of music and education. He was working alongside his father at the sawmill when a flying board struck them. Because he turned to protect his 14-year-old son instead of moving out of danger, Leldon Ball was killed instantly.

Ball lived with various friends and relatives in Hartselle until joining the U.S. Marine Corps in 1973 soon after graduating high school. He was honorably discharged as a sergeant in 1977. A previous ruling by U.S. Federal Judge Frank M. Johnson, Jr that removed height and weight restrictions cleared the way for Ball at 5'4" and 135 lbs to become an Alabama State Trooper in 1978, the smallest in its history at the time.

He served in uniform as a highway patrolman for 8 years, as well as a member of the SWAT team and the Special Operations Unit. In 1986, Ball transferred to the Major Crimes Unit of the Alabama Bureau of Investigation conducting a wide variety of criminal inv including His investigations included homicide, public corruption, voter fraud, child abuse, and organized crime. He was also the lead hostage negotiator in numerous hostage/barricade suspect incidents throughout the state. Ball retired from the Alabama State Troopers in 2002 with 25 years of law enforcement service.

In 2002, Ball was elected as a Republican to represent the 10th District in the Alabama Legislature which encompasses Redstone Arsenal, the Marshall Space Flight Center, and the U.S. Space and Rocket Center.

During his 20-year tenure as a state representative he served as Chairman of the House Ethics and Campaign Finance Committee and the Chairman of the Madison County House Delegation, in addition multiple other committees including Judiciary, Public Safety, Education Policy, County and Municipal Government, State Government, and Internal Affairs.

Although, much of his legislative career was focused the promotion of comprehensive Ethics and Transparency reforms in Alabama, he is probably best known for his advocacy for medical cannabis since the passage of Carly's Law in 2014, Leni's Law in 2016, and the Darren Wesley "Ato" Hall Compassion Act in 2021.

After several years of declining interest in partisan politics, Ball chose not to run for another legislative term in 2022, to publish his memoir, Picking, Politicking, and Pontificating (While Faithfully Fighting Corruption) and devote his attention to writing, storytelling, mentoring, and music.

Soon after his final session in 2022, Ball left the Republican Party, declaring himself an unaffiliated independent. During the 2022 campaign between the Republican candidate David Cole and the Democratic candidate Marilyn Lands, Ball remained neutral; although Lands had been his campaign manager in 2002 when he was first elected to the state legislature. However, following the 2023 resignation of Ball's successor in the 10th district, David Cole, following an election fraud conviction, Ball endorsed Lands when she ran in the subsequent special election as a Democrat.

Ball and his wife Karen live in Madison, Alabama with their two dogs Grant and Molly.
