= Redeem the Vote =

Redeem the Vote is an American Christian right organization founded by Randy Brinson during the 2004 presidential campaign to register young evangelical Christians to vote, in the model of MTV's youth-vote Rock the Vote campaign. The organization has since moved to issue advocacy and mobilization of an email list self-reported at 71 million names.

== History ==
Brinson founded Redeem the Vote in 2003 with $300,000 of his own money. In February 2004, Brinson attended a national religious broadcaster convention and met the marketing firm for Mel Gibson's The Passion of the Christ, whom he hired to promote the organization.

By October 2004, Redeem the Vote had enlisted 47 Contemporary Christian music groups, including Steven Curtis Chapman, Point of Grace, Jeremy Camp, FFH and Jaci Velasquez, to register young evangelicals and promote political participation. Sponsors included Sean Hannity and Fox News, the American Tract Society, Focus on the Family, FamilyNet and the Gospel Music Association. Gov. Mike Huckabee of Arkansas, Chuck Colson of Prison Fellowship and Gary Bauer of American Values were members of the national advisory board.

The group estimated it registered between 70,000 and 78,000 members based on the 30,000 forms distributed at concerts and 40,000 over the Internet.

Meanwhile, its email list grew in connection with the promotions for Passion of the Christ, reaching 12 million addresses by the election. A video message recorded by Christ portrayer Jim Caviezel was shown in churches across the country and e-mailed to more than 60 million people.

"In order to preserve the God-given freedoms we each hold dear, it's important that we let our voices be heard. Voting is not only a privilege, but also an important responsibility to let your voice be heard. It's critical that you participate in the political process, and we encourage you to get involved. Together we can make a difference by voting on Nov. 2. See you at the polls."

During the 2008 Republican nomination campaign, Redeem the Vote partnered with the Mike Huckabee campaign. Huckabee had been an RTV national chairman in 2004, and the Huckabee campaign showed the most interest when a Redeem the Vote list manager, Webcasting TV, pitched their services. RTV claims to now have 71 million addresses, 25 million belonging to "25 and 45 years old, upwardly mobile, right-of-center, conservative households." The campaign got over 414,000 Iowa contacts from Bronson's list, which is four times the expected participation in the Iowa caucuses.
