= Cam Ward (politician) =

American politician (born 1971)

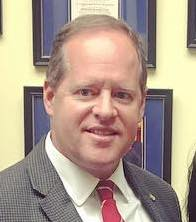
- Ward in 2017

Director of the Alabama Bureau of Pardons and Paroles
- Incumbent
- Assumed office December 7, 2020
- Preceded by: Charles Graddick

Member of the Alabama Senate from the 14th district
- In office November 3, 2010 – December 7, 2020
- Preceded by: Hank Erwin
- Succeeded by: April Weaver

Member of the Alabama House of Representatives from the 49th district
- In office November 5, 2002 – November 3, 2010
- Preceded by: Dave Thomas
- Succeeded by: April Weaver

Personal details
- Born: March 24, 1971 (age 55) Milton, Florida, U.S.
- Party: Republican
- Education: Troy University (BA); Samford University (JD)

Cam Ward (born March 24, 1971) is an American politician who served as a Republican member of the Alabama Senate, representing District 14 from 2010 to 2020. He previously represented District 49 of the Alabama House of Representatives from 2002 to 2010.

== Biography ==
Ward was born in Milton, Florida, and graduated from Bradford County High School in Starke, Florida. He received an undergraduate degree (international relations and political science) from Troy University and a J.D. from the Cumberland School of Law at Samford University. While at Troy, Ward served two terms as Student Government Association president.

Ward is the executive director of the Industrial Development Board of Alabaster, Alabama. He is chairman of the Autism Task Force of Alabama and helped launch Autism Alabama, "an on-line library providing distance learning for teachers who have children on the autism spectrum."

== Career ==
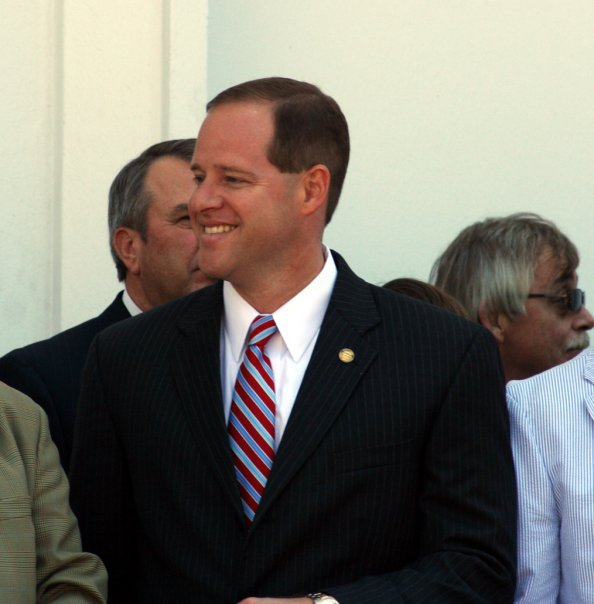
Ward in 2009

Ward was appointed to serve as Director of the Alabama Bureau of Pardons & Paroles in 2020 by Governor Kay Ivey. As Director, Ward targeted drastic reductions in recidivism rates by implementing and expanding reentry programming in Alabama. This included the opening of the Perry County PREP Facility and expansion of the Bureau's network of Day Reporting Centers. Since opening, the PREP Center has a 99% reentry success rate -- with fewer than 1% of program participants recidivating. The approach encompasses mental health treatment, substance use treatment, education and workforce development. Ward cites these program pillars as the solid foundation for reentry success.

Prior to his appointment to the Bureau, Ward was elected to the Alabama House of Representatives for District 49, where he served two terms. In 2010, he was elected to the Alabama Senate, representing District 14.

In December 2010, Ward supported a piece of legislation granting subpoena power to the Alabama Ethics Commission. The bill passed both chambers of the Alabama Legislature on December 16, 2010, and was signed into law by Governor Bob Riley.

In 2015, Ward was arrested for DUI and admitted pled guilty. He apologized and entered a pre-trial diversion program for first-time offenders. Shortly after, he announced an amicable divorce from his wife of 23 years, Julie Cain, on Facebook.

In 2016, Ward was recognized by the Foundation for Government Accountability with the Friend of Government Accountability Award for his efforts in healthcare reform.

In 2017, the Center for Legislative Energy and Environmental Research announced Ward as its chairman for 2017–2018.

In May 2019, he voted to make abortion a crime at any stage in a pregnancy, with no exemptions for cases of rape or incest. As chairman of the Alabama Senate Judiciary Committee, Ward voted for an amendment to HB314 making exceptions for rape or incest. The amendment, sponsored by Sen. Tom Whatley, was approved in committee but stripped before final passage on the floor.
