= Loretta Nall =

American activist

- Occupation: Political activist
- Political party: Libertarian
- Other political affiliations: United States Marijuana Party
- Website: NallForGovernor.com

Loretta Nall is the founder of the U.S. Marijuana Party, which calls for the legalization of cannabis. She was a write-in candidate for governor of Alabama in 2006.

== History ==
Nall founded the USMjParty in 2002. In 2005, she co-founded Alabamians for Caring Use, a medical marijuana advocacy/lobbying group. Before his 2005 arrest in Vancouver, the so-called "Prince of Pot," Marc Emery, employed Nall under the auspices of Cannabis Culture magazine. Nall herself was booked and jailed for less than one day on September 17, 2002, for possession of marijuana and drug paraphernalia after police made a search of her home.

Besides advocating the legalization of cannabis in the United States, Nall is also an outspoken critic of the worldwide war on drugs. After a 2004 visit to Colombia, she has spoken and written against the United States and Colombian militaries' aerial destruction of Colombian coca fields with herbicides, citing dangers to local human populations and the environment.

Nall also calls for tax credits for homeschoolers, American withdrawal from the Iraq War, and an end to the war on drugs. She opposes the No Child Left Behind, USA PATRIOT, and REAL ID acts. Nall is a contributor to LewRockwell.com.

== 2006 Alabama gubernatorial campaign ==
Nall secured the Libertarian Party of Alabama's 2006 nomination for governor of Alabama at the party's 8 April 2006 convention in Montgomery, Alabama. Since Nall's campaign failed to collect the 40,000+ signatures required to achieve statewide ballot access in Alabama, she ran as a write-in candidate against Republican incumbent Bob Riley and Democratic challenger Lucy Baxley. Nall's campaign was covered by national media after pictures of the candidate that revealed her buxom appearance drew comments from local political commentator Bob Ingram. Ingram concluded a 7 March 2006 op-ed in the Montgomery Independent with the following comment:

Allow me to express a personal note of appreciation to Bob Martin, the editor of this newspaper, for finding a picture of gubernatorial candidate Loretta Nall to run with my column last week. I am sure it attracted a lot of readers. In 55 years of political writing, that was a first for me—a picture in my column of a woman displaying cleavage. I can only hope that my mother ... and I know for a fact where she ended in the after life ... didn't see that column. She wouldn't have approved of that picture.

The election was won by Riley, with Nall receiving only 235 votes, or 0.02%, but she says that she will continue to run for Alabama office in the future.

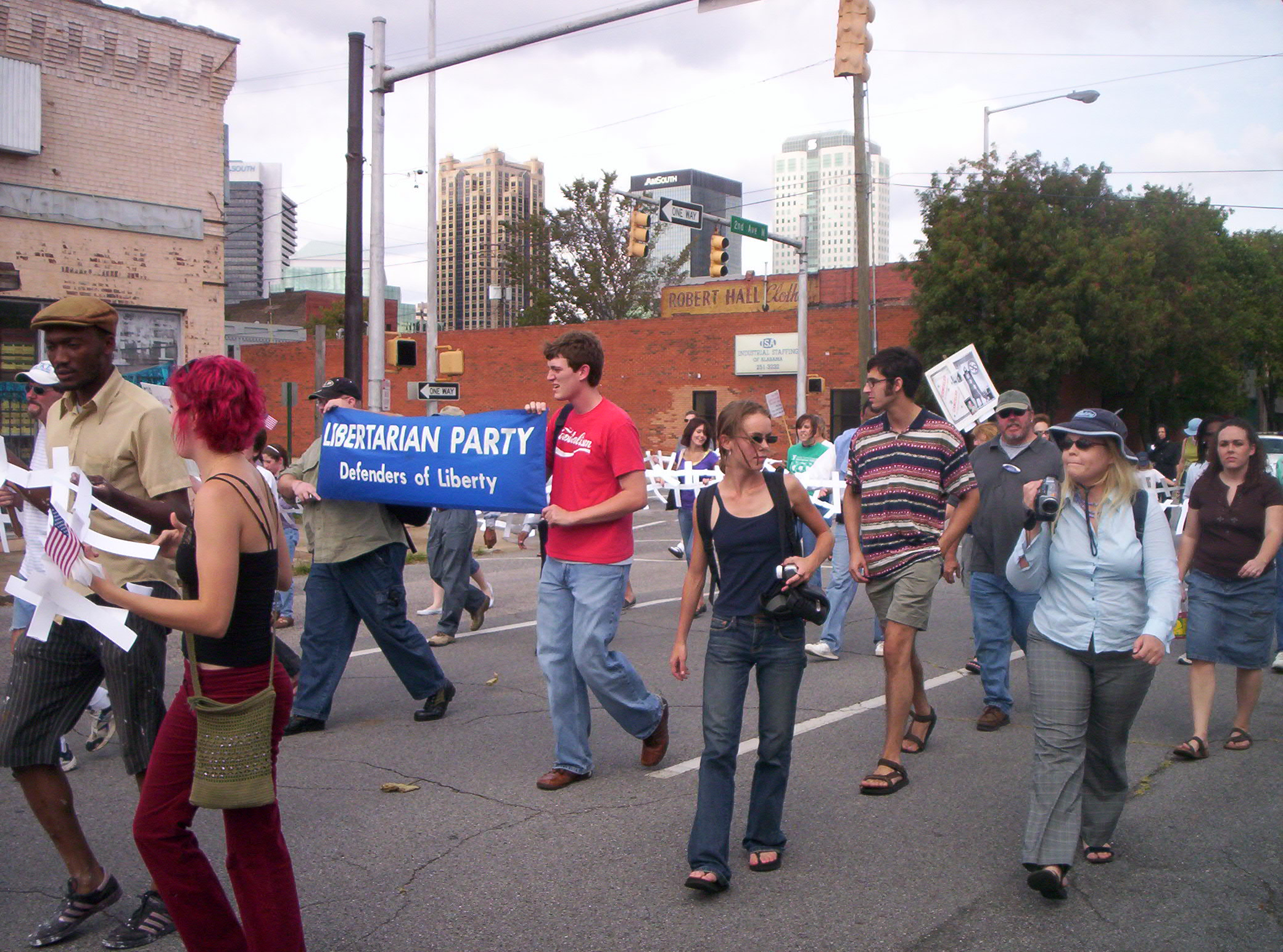
Loretta Nall (far right, with camera) joined others in a September 24, 2005 anti-war protest in Birmingham, Alabama.

== Sex toy drive ==
In November 2007, to protest the Anti-Obscenity Enforcement Act of 1998, Nall encouraged people to mail sex toys to Alabama Attorney General Troy King, who sought to prosecute shops that sell the devices.

== Notes ==
Party political offices
Preceded by John Sophocleus	Libertarian Party Nominee for Governor of Alabama; 2006	Succeeded by undecided
