= Nathan Mathis =

American farmer and politician (born 1943)

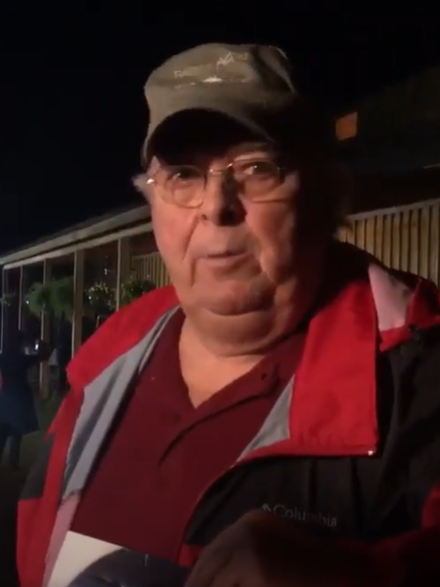

Member of the Alabama House of Representatives
- In office January 1983 – January 1995
- Preceded by: Gene Daniels
- Succeeded by: Riley Seibenhener
- Constituency: 73rd district (1983); 87th district (1983–1995)

Personal details
- Born: April 18, 1943 (age 83) Midland City, Alabama, U.S.
- Party: Democratic (before 2010, 2013–present); Republican (2010–2013)

Nathan Mathis (born April 18, 1943) is an American farmer and politician. He served twelve years in the Alabama House of Representatives, and has made several unsuccessful runs for office since. Mathis garnered national attention in 2017 when he criticized Senate candidate Roy Moore for his past comments on homosexuality and spoke in support of his daughter, who had killed herself after being outed as a lesbian.

== Biography ==
Mathis was born in Midland City, Alabama, and graduated from Slocomb High School. He served as chair of the Houston County Commission from 1974 until 1978, and in 1982 ran for the Alabama House of Representatives as a Democrat, serving until his defeat in 1994.

Mathis attempted a comeback to the House in 1998; this effort proved unsuccessful. In 2002, he ran for Alabama Commissioner of Agriculture and Industries but lost the Democratic primary.

In June 2005, Mathis declared his intent to run for Governor of Alabama in 2006 as an independent. If elected, Mathis said he would build 15 casinos in Alabama in order to help fund the state. He ultimately entered the Democratic primary, but lost to Lucy Baxley.

In 2010, Mathis switched parties and became a Republican. He ran that same year for Alabama Senate but lost the Republican primary. In 2012, he ran as a Republican for Houston County Commission. In 2014, Mathis reverted to the Democratic Party and announced his intent to run for the Alabama Senate, but his candidacy was blocked by the Alabama Democratic Party due to his support of Republican candidates within the four years prior to the election.

In 2016, Mathis was the Democratic nominee for Alabama's 2nd congressional district against incumbent Republican Martha Roby. Despite the district's heavy Republican lean and Republican presidential nominee Donald Trump winning the district a nearly 2–1 margin, he lost the election by only 8 percentage points.

Mathis ran as a Democrat for Alabama's 2nd congressional district in 2020. He lost the primary election.

== Personal life ==
Mathis and his wife, Sue, had two children, both of whom are deceased. His son, Joey, died of a prescription painkiller overdose in 2004; his daughter, Patti Sue, committed suicide in 1995. Mathis resides in Wicksburg, Alabama, where he operates a peanut farm.

Mathis attracted considerable attention in 2017, during the special election campaign for the U.S. Senate. He protested the candidacy of Roy Moore and particularly homophobic remarks made by Moore. His daughter was a lesbian, and had come out to a friend who later informed Mathis. Mathis did not take the news well, and his daughter committed suicide years later. He expressed regret, saying in a 2012 letter: "Sometime after Patti died, I attended church and a visiting preacher was preaching. About 10 minutes into the sermon, he bashed gays the rest of the way. As soon as the invitation song was given, I went out the door with one of the worst headaches I had ever had. I was ashamed of myself for sitting there and not defending Patti. I have not been much since."

== Electoral history ==
Alabama House District 73 Democratic primary, 1982

- Nathan Mathis – 4,395 (39.1%)
- Gene Daniels – 4,332 (38.6%)
- Jack Smith – 2,498 (22.3%)

Alabama House District 73 Democratic primary Runoff, 1982

- Nathan Mathis – 6,791 (61.4%)
- Gene Daniels – 4,269 (38.6%)

Alabama House District 73 Election, 1982

- Nathan Mathis (D) – 6,513 (100%)

Alabama House District 87 Election, 1983

- Nathan Mathis (D) – 2,960 (77.7%)
- Bill Whitestone (R) – 851 (22.3%)

Alabama House District 87 Election, 1986

- Nathan Mathis (D) – 8,461 (72.4%)
- Russ Rothrock (R) – 3,2298 (27.6%)

Alabama House District 87 Democratic primary, 1990

- Nathan Mathis – 5,074 (62.2%)
- Charles Flippo – 2,164 (26.5%)
- Pat Whigpen – 926 (11.3%)

Alabama House District 87 Election, 1990

- Nathan Mathis (D) – 7,569 (57.6%)
- Eric Johnson (R) – 5,573 (42.4%)

Alabama House District 87 Election, 1994

- Riley Seibenhener (R) – 7,974 (65.1%)
- Nathan Mathis (D) – 4,277 (34.9%)

Alabama House District 87 Democratic primary, 1998

- Nathan Mathis – 1,700 (47.2%)
- Wynnton Melton – 1,376 (38.2%)
- Larry Shoupe – 525 (14.6%)

Alabama House District 87 Democratic primary Runoff, 1998

- Nathan Mathis – 1,195 (54.8%)
- Wynnton Melton – 984 (45.2%)

Alabama House District 87 election, 1998

- Riley Seibenhener (R) – 7,810 (58.9%)
- Nathan Mathis (D) – 5,434 (41.0%)

Alabama Commissioner of Agriculture and Industry Democratic primary, 2002

- Ron Sparks – 183,097 (51.3%)
- Nathan Mathis – 120,861 (33.4%)
- Jacky R. Warhurst – 52,670 (14.8%)

Alabama gubernatorial Democratic primary, 2006

- Lucy Baxley – 279,165 (59.8%)
- Don Siegelman – 170,016 (36.4%)
- Joe Copeland – 4,141 (0.9%)
- Nathan Mathis – 4,000 (0.9%)
- Katherine Mack – 3,392 (0.7%)
- James Potts – 3,333 (0.7%)
- Harry Lyons – 2,490 (0.5%)

Alabama Senate District 29 Republican primary, 2010

- George Flowers – 12,783 (64.1%)
- Nathan Mathis – 7,155 (35.9%)

Alabama's 2nd Congressional District Election, 2016

- Martha Roby (R) – 134,886 (48.8%)
- Nathan Mathis (D) – 112,089 (40.5%)
- Rebecca Gerritson (I) – 25,027 (9.0%)
- Write-ins – 4,682 (1.7%)

Alabama's 2nd Congressional District Democratic primary, 2020

- Phyllis Harvey-Hall (D) - 27,399 (59.2%)
- Nathan Mathis (D) - 18,898 (40.8%)
