= 1994 Alabama State Treasurer election =

- November 8, 1994
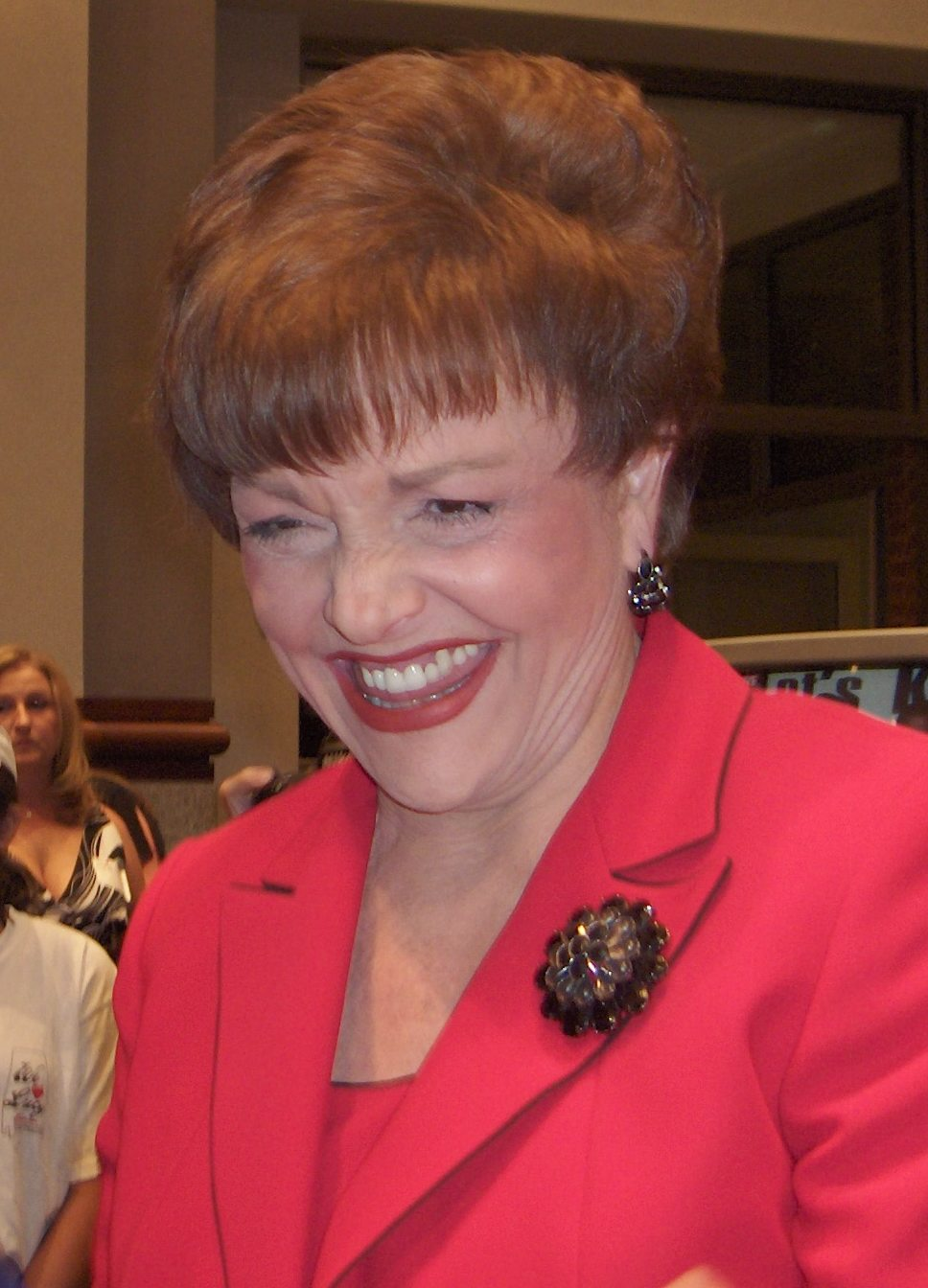

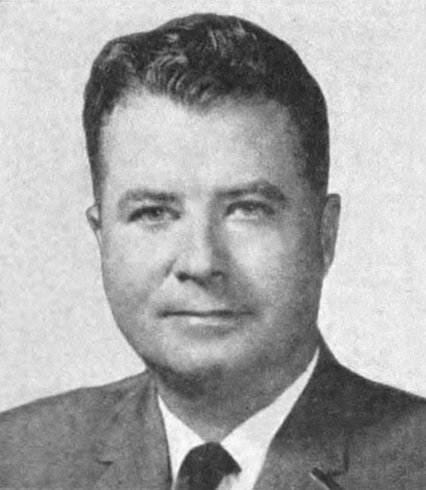
Nominee	Lucy Baxley	James D. Martin
Party	Democratic	Republican
Popular vote	561,733	561,701
Percentage	50.001%	49.999%
- County results Baxley: 50–60% 60–70% 70–80% 80–90% James: 50–60% 60–70% 70–80%
State Treasurer before election
George Wallace Jr.
Democratic
Elected State Treasurer
Lucy Baxley
Democratic

The 1994 Alabama State Treasurer election was held on November 8, 1994, to elect the Alabama State Treasurer. Democratic incumbent George Wallace Jr. was term-limited and instead ran unsuccessfully for the Democratic nomination for lieutenant governor of Alabama. Democrat and former Second Lady of Alabama Lucy Baxley won the election, defeating Republican former U.S. Representative James D. Martin by a razor-thin margin of just 32 votes.

== Democratic primary ==
=== Candidates ===
- Lucy Baxley, former Second Lady of Alabama (1983–1987)
- Elizabeth Alexander
- Steven Phelps

=== Results ===
Democratic primary results
Party	Candidate	Votes	%
Democratic	Lucy Baxley	313,154	55.20%
Democratic	Elizabeth Alexander	157,184	27.71%
Democratic	Steven Phelps	96,958	17.09%
Total votes		642,173	100.00%

== Republican primary ==
=== Candidates ===
- James D. Martin, former U.S. representative from Alabama's 7th congressional district (1965–1967)
- Jim Anton

=== Results ===
Republican primary results
Party	Candidate	Votes	%
Republican	James D. Martin	142,490	82.24%
Republican	Jim Anton	30,775	17.76%
Total votes		173,265	100.00%

== General election ==
=== Candidates ===
- Lucy Baxley, former Second Lady of Alabama (1983–1987) (Democratic)
- James D. Martin, former U.S. representative from Alabama's 7th congressional district (1965–1967) (Republican)

=== Results ===
1994 Alabama State Treasurer election results
Party	Candidate	Votes	%	±%
Democratic	Lucy Baxley	561,733	50.001%	−50.00%
Republican	James D. Martin	561,701	49.999%	N/A
Total votes		1,123,434	100.00%	
Democratic hold				
