= Sophocleus =

Sophocleus is a surname. Notable people with the surname include:

- John Sophocleus, American economist and political activist
- Theodore J. Sophocleus (1939–2018), American politician from Maryland
