= 1998 Alabama State Treasurer election =

- November 2, 1998
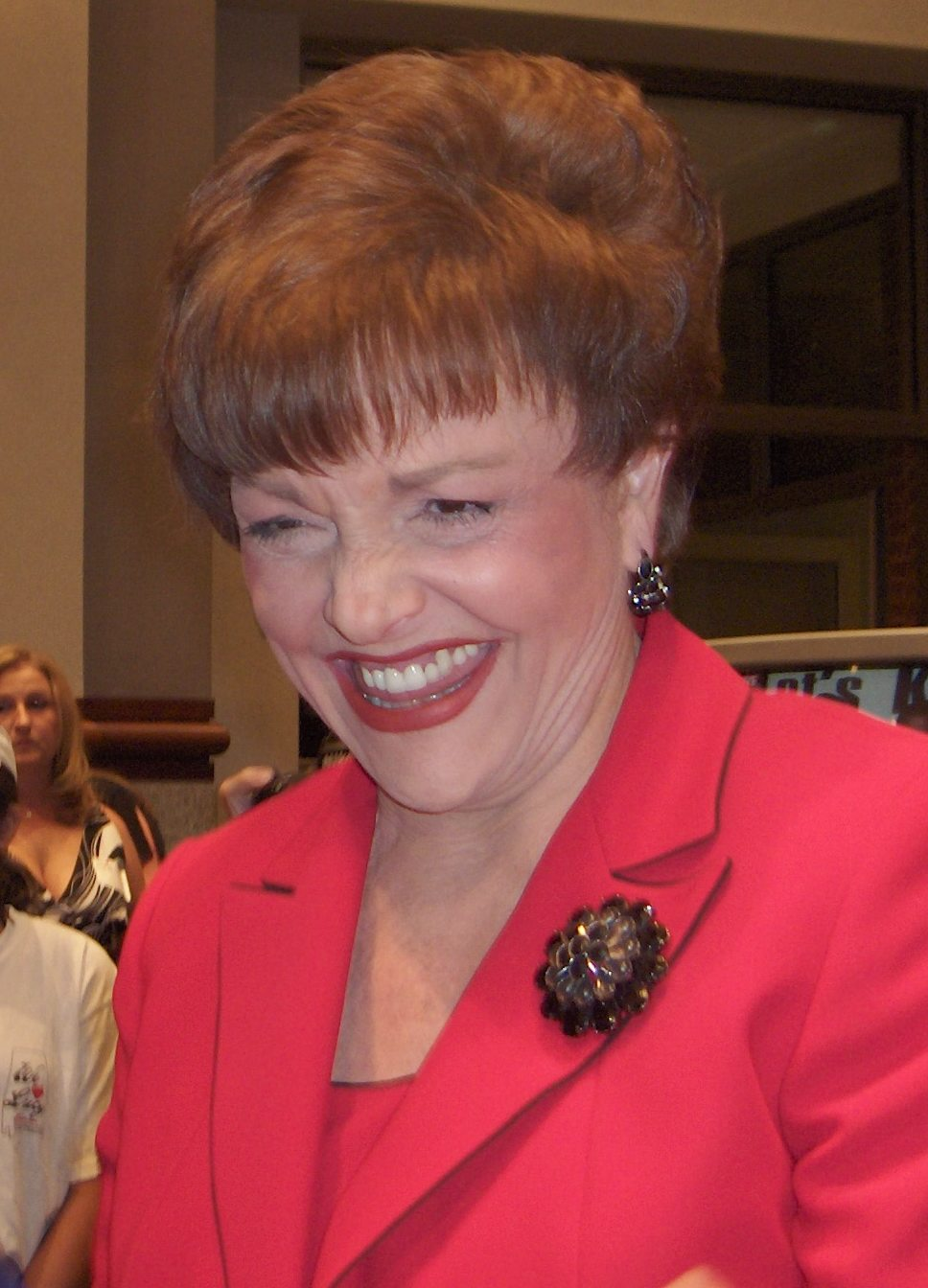

Nominee	Lucy Baxley	Tom Davis
Party	Democratic	Republican
Popular vote	810,746	443,901
Percentage	64.62%	35.38%
- County results Baxley: 50–60% 60–70% 70–80% 80–90% >90% Davis: 50–60%
State Treasurer before election
Lucy Baxley
Democratic
Elected State Treasurer
Lucy Baxley
Democratic

The 1998 Alabama State Treasurer election was held on November 2, 1998, to elect the Alabama State Treasurer. Democratic incumbent Lucy Baxley won re-election in a landslide, defeating Republican Tom Davis by nearly thirty percentage points and winning all but two counties in the state. As of 2026, this is the last time a Democrat has been elected Alabama State Treasurer.

== Republican primary ==
=== Candidates ===
- Tom Davis
- K.D. Livingston

=== Results ===
Republican primary results
Party	Candidate	Votes	%
Republican	Tom Davis	171,455	67.98%
Republican	K.D. Livingston	80,741	32.02%
Total votes		252,196	100.00%

== General election ==
=== Candidates ===
- Lucy Baxley, incumbent Alabama State Treasurer (1995–2003) (Democratic)
- Tom Davis (Republican)

=== Results ===
1998 Alabama State Treasurer election results
Party	Candidate	Votes	%	±%
Democratic	Lucy Baxley	810,746	64.62%	+14.62%
Republican	Tom Davis	443,901	35.38%	−14.62%
Total votes		1,254,647	100.00%	
Democratic hold				
