= Bill Armistead =

American politician

Bill Armistead (born May 29, 1944) is an American politician from the state of Alabama. He served as the chairman of the Alabama Republican Party from 2011 to 2015. He served in the Alabama Senate from 1994 to 2002, representing the 14th district.

== Early life and education ==
Bill Armistead was born on May 29, 1944, in Campbell, Alabama. He attended Samford University, where he graduated with a bachelor's degree in business administration in 1966. While at Samford, Armistead founded the Samford chapter of the College Republicans.

== Career ==
Armistead worked for trucking companies for 20 years before becoming a staffer for H. Guy Hunt, the Governor of Alabama. He worked for Hunt from 1988 through 1993 as his chief economic advisor. He was elected to the Alabama Senate in 1994, and was reelected in 1998. In 2002, Armistead ran for Lieutenant Governor of Alabama. He lost the election to Democrat Lucy Baxley.

In 2011, Armistead was elected chairman of the Alabama Republican Party. He stepped down in 2015, when Terry Lathan was elected.

Armistead worked on both the 2010 and 2022 gubernatorial campaigns of businessman Tim James. In 2010, Armistead was a Birmingham regional director for James' campaign, but after James lost a spot in the runoff for the primary, Armistead began working for future Governor Robert J. Bentley's campaign instead. Armistead also served as campaign chairman for James' 2022 gubernatorial run.

== Personal life ==
Armistead resides in Vestavia Hills, Alabama. He was married to Emily Armistead from April 1968 until her death in a traffic accident in March 2017.

Alabama Senate
Preceded by Frank "Butch" Ellis, Jr.	Member of the Alabama Senate from the 14th district 1995–2003	Succeeded by Hank Erwin
Party political offices
Preceded by Steve Windom	Republican nominee for Lieutenant Governor of Alabama; 2002	Succeeded by Luther Strange
Preceded by Mike Hubbard	Chairman of the Alabama Republican Party; 2011–2015	Succeeded by Terry Lathan
