= Pansey, Alabama =

Unincorporated community in Alabama, United States

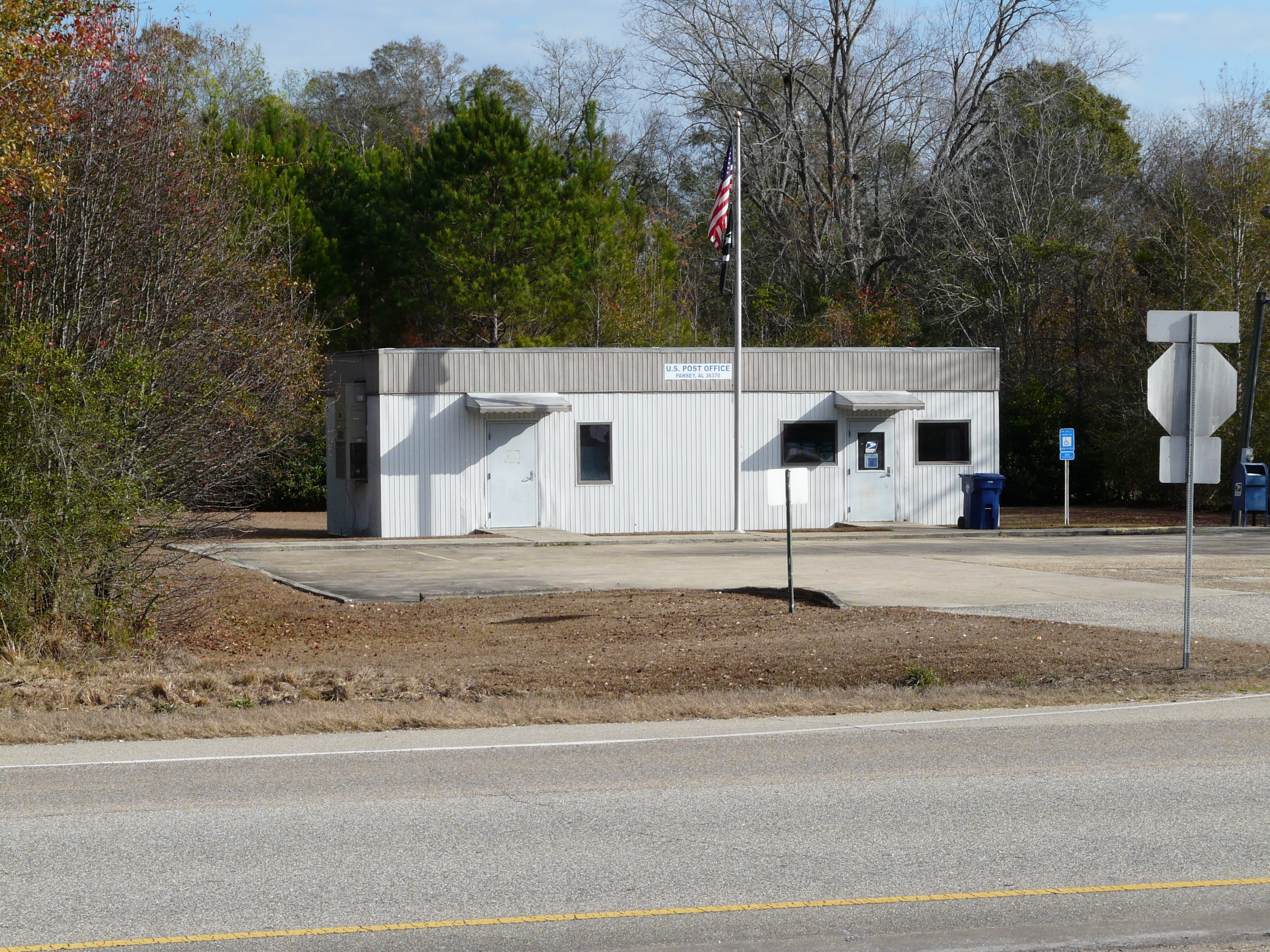
United States Post Officer for Pansey, Alabama

Pansey is an unincorporated community in Houston County, Alabama, United States. Pansey is located along U.S. Route 84, 13.5 miles (21.7 km) east-southeast of Dothan. Pansey has a post office with ZIP code 36370.

== Demographics ==
According to the 1910 U.S. Census, Pansey incorporated in 1902, a year before Houston County was created (then in Henry County). It disincorporated at some point after 1920.

Historical population
Census	Pop.	Note	%±
1910	106		—
1920	166		56.6%
U.S. Decennial Census

== Notable person ==
- Lucy Baxley, Lieutenant Governor of Alabama from 2003 to 2007, was born in Pansey.
