= John Wahl =

American politician (born 1986)

- Wahl in 2023

Lieutenant Governor-elect of Alabama
- Assuming office January 16, 2027
- Governor: Tommy Tuberville (elect)
- Succeeding: Will Ainsworth

Chair of the Alabama Republican Party
- In office February 27, 2021 – January 23, 2026
- Preceded by: Terry Lathan
- Succeeded by: Joan Reynolds (acting)

Personal details
- Born: Nehemiah Ezekiel Wahl; July 30, 1986 (age 40) Athens, Alabama, U.S.
- Party: Republican

Nehemiah Ezekiel "John" Wahl (born 1986) is an American politician and butterfly breeder who served as chairman of the Alabama Republican Party from 2021 to 2026. In January 2023, he was elected as a vice-chair of the Republican National Committee, representing the RNC's southern region. Wahl was the youngest Republican state party chair in the United States during his tenure. In 2024, he was also elected chair of the Alabama Public Library Service by his fellow board members. Wahl was the Republican nominee for the 2026 Alabama lieutenant gubernatorial election, which he won.

== Early life and career ==
Wahl was born in Athens, Alabama. He is the brother of Noah Wahl, a fellow political strategist and the current chair of the Limestone County Republican Party. As a teenager, Wahl was a door-to-door grassroots activist for the Republican Party. Wahl was later a part of WT&S Consulting, a political consulting and polling firm associated with the Alabama Republican Party. He was also the chair of Stop the Small Business Tax PAC, a political action committee that defeated a local property tax increase in Athens.

By trade, Wahl is a butterfly farmer and operates a farm in western Limestone County, a business he started when he was still in high school. Butterflies bred on Wahl's farm have supplied various zoos, botanical gardens, and exhibits across the country with over 40,000 butterflies annually. Wahl has also served on the board of the International Butterfly Breeders Association. Wahl's farm has been featured by various media outlets seeking to cover the niche industry of butterfly farming, including Mental Floss, Simply Southern TV, and Smarter Every Day. Wahl describes the industry as one of the "most beautiful" job opportunities, which he contrasts with his work as a politician.

== Political career ==
Wahl held senior roles in multiple state and local campaigns before becoming actively involved with the Alabama Republican Party. In the 2012 election cycle, Wahl was selected to serve as field director for the Alabama Republican Party. Two years later, he was elected to the party's State Executive Committee. Following the 2016 election cycle, Wahl was chosen as the vice chairman for the Alabama Republican Party's division for the 5th congressional district. In 2019, Wahl was elected as senior vice chairman of the party at the executive committee's winter meeting.

During the 2020 United States presidential election, Wahl was one of Alabama's nine Electoral College representatives supporting President Donald J. Trump. He also played a senior role on Tommy Tuberville's successful campaign for U.S. Senate, and later served on Senator Tuberville's transition team in Washington, D.C. When Terry Lathan announced that she would not seek another term as chair of the Alabama Republican Party, Wahl ran and won the Chairmanship to replace her on February 27, 2021. Wahl said that, as party chair, he would focus on tax relief, border security, election integrity, and pushing back on socialism as some of his main priorities.

During his first term as party chair, Wahl oversaw the Alabama Republican Party in launching a new minority outreach team, and led the "Operation Restore America" campaign, a group of volunteers assembled to assist with national and other out-of-state elections in 2021 and 2022, including the 2021 Virginia gubernatorial election, which was won by Republican Glenn Youngkin. Wahl also managed the Republican Party's involvement in the 2022 Alabama elections, including a debate over congressional redistricting for the 2022 United States House of Representatives elections in Alabama. The conflict eventually led to a Supreme Court case, Allen v. Milligan, in which Republicans were initially granted a stay for 2022, but the district map was overturned in 2023. Wahl was also an advocate for closed primaries (which the party approved in August 2022), school choice, and adoption reform in Alabama. By 2023, Wahl had helped raise over $2.8 million for the Alabama Republican Party.

In January 2023, Wahl was selected as a vice chair for the Republican National Committee, leading its southern division. Wahl said that he was looking forward to working on a "fresh vision" for the Republican Party in the 2024 election cycle. At the Alabama Republican Party's 2023 winter meeting, he was re-elected as chair for another two-year term. Wahl faced no opposition and was elected by acclamation. In September 2023, Wahl was profiled in a series of NPR articles highlighting the youngest Republican State Chairman (Wahl himself) and the youngest Democratic State Chair (Anderson Clayton of North Carolina). Wahl said that his goals for the future of the Alabama Republican Party would include attracting Black voters from Alabama's Black Belt region, as well as younger voters.

In March 2025, Wahl was re-elected as chairman of the Alabama Republican Party for a third term.

Wahl has faced criticism over the alleged misuse of state Republican Party funds during his time as chair. In March 2025, the state Republican Party authorized a four-year audit of party funds and expenditures, which had not been released as of July 2026. Several ethics complaints were also filed by members of the state party against Wahl and his brother, alleging that their consulting group was using his position for gain.

=== Voter ID ===
In fall 2022, AL.com published a series of stories reporting on Wahl and his Anabaptist family members, who objected to voter ID, calling it the "mark of the beast." Wahl, who has used "John Wahl" on official legal forms in Alabama, had previously been identified by his legal name "Nehemiah Ezekiel Wahl" on his Tennessee-issued drivers license and past voter registration in Tennessee in 2025. Wahl instead used "John Wahl" on a number of Alabama official legal documents, including ethics disclosures, which ask for a full legal name. When prompted to show a valid photo ID during the 2020 election, he presented a "state employee" card identifying himself as "John" Wahl. He later described this ID as legally issued by the State Auditor's office.

The question of Wahl's ID attracted national attention after John Merrill, former Secretary of State of Alabama, said that Wahl's card from the State Auditor's office was not a valid photo ID. In October, 2022, the Limestone County poll worker who inspected Wahl's ID was later fired after raising concerns about its validity. Wahl stated that the ID had been approved by Limestone County's probate judge. Later, he called the claims 'rubbish.' Additionally, Wahl was registered to vote in Tennessee and Alabama at the same time, under two different names; his legal name "Nehemiah Ezekiel Wahl" in Tennessee, and his nickname "John Wahl" in Alabama. Though two secretaries of state, the chief elections official in Alabama, have filed reports with the Alabama attorney general's office, there has not been a formal investigation.

=== Lieutenant governor campaign ===
In April 2025, AL.com reported that Wahl was a potential candidate for the 2026 Alabama lieutenant gubernatorial election. Wahl confirmed to 1819 News that he was exploring the possibility of a campaign for lieutenant governor in May 2025. In January 2026, President Donald Trump drafted Wahl to run through a Truth Social post, with the President calling Wahl a "true MAGA warrior" and saying that "John has been with us from the very beginning." He ended his Truth Social post by saying, "RUN, JOHN, RUN!" Wahl filed in the final moments of qualifying, joining a crowded field that included seven other Republican hopefuls.

In March 2026, Wahl faced criticism from his primary opponent, Wes Allen, for attending a dinner at an Islamic center in Anniston, Alabama. Allen accused Wahl of participating in a Ramadan event, stating it showed Wahl did not share the values of Alabamians.

Wahl strongly defended his attendance, stating he was invited by local officials to what was presented as a "community interfaith gathering," not a celebration of Ramadan, and noted that dozens of other elected officials were present. He accused Allen of a "desperate attempt... to deceive voters" and of "weaponizing Christianity," asserting that his sole purpose for attending was to "speak openly about my faith and the values that guide my life." Pushing back against Allen's claim that committed Christians should avoid such spaces, Wahl stated, "Jesus did not stay in the synagogue—He went to the well to speak to the Samaritan woman... and He commanded us to go into all the world."

Wahl has campaigned on cutting the state income tax, grocery tax, and property tax. Additionally, Wahl has stated that he is open to creating a lottery for Alabama, opening the door for casino gambling. However, he recanted his position after pushback from conservatives.

Wahl's entry into the race necessitated his resignation as chair of the Alabama Republican Party, which he tendered the same day. Wahl was succeeded first by Joan Reynolds in an acting capacity, then Scott Stadthagen following the latter's election as chair.

On May 19, 2026, Wahl led the initial Republican primary field with 192,431 votes, advancing to a primary runoff on June 16, 2026, against former Alabama Secretary of State Wes Allen.

Wahl officially secured the Republican nomination following a decisive run-off victory, capturing 57% of the vote (175,910 votes) to Allen's 43% (132,886 votes). Notably, his performance earned him the most Republican votes in both the primary and the runoff of any statewide race during that election cycle. With the nomination secured, Wahl moved forward to face Democratic nominee Phillip Ensler in the general election.

=== 2026 Ballot Challenge and Residency ===
During the 2026 Republican primary for lieutenant governor, Wahl faced a formal ballot challenge concerning his residency and past voter identification. Alabama law states that the lieutenant governor must have resided in Alabama for seven years prior to holding office. The challenge claimed that Wahl did not maintain an Alabama residence for the previous seven years, citing his Tennessee driver's license, property records, and voter registration using his legal name in Tennessee as late as 2025.

In response to the residency allegations, Wahl addressed the issue, stating that his Tennessee properties were tied to the operational logistics of his commercial agricultural business located in a border county, and claimed that his primary legal domicile has consistently remained in Alabama. Regarding the voter identification controversy, Wahl maintained that his use of a State Auditor press credential at the polls had been previously vetted by the local probate judge, a claim supported by former State Auditor Jim Zeigler, who publicly authorized the official badge, despite two secretaries of state declaring that the card was not an approved voter ID. When asked why he was registered to vote in Tennessee as late as 2025, which requires two proofs of residency and a signature verifying residency, Wahl gave no comment.

In late January 2026, the ALGOP Steering Committee convened to formally review the residency and ballot challenges. Following the review process, the committee split in a 9-9 tie, with Wahl's former vice-chairwoman Reynolds casting the tie-breaking vote as acting chairwoman to dismiss the challenge.

== Alabama Public Library Service board ==
In 2022, Alabama Governor Kay Ivey appointed John Wahl to the Alabama Public Library Service board. He was later elected chairman of the board during its September 2024 meeting. Wahl has faced criticism from activist groups for advocating the relocation of books alleged to contain sexually explicit material from children's and youth sections of public libraries.

== Personal life ==
Wahl resides in Limestone County, Alabama, where his butterfly farm is located.

Party political offices
Preceded by Terry Lathan	Chair of the Alabama Republican Party; 2021–2026	Succeeded by Joan Reynolds; Acting
Preceded by Will Ainsworth	Republican nominee for Lieutenant Governor of Alabama; 2026	Most recent
Political offices
Preceded by Will Ainsworth	Lieutenant Governor of Alabama; Taking office 2027	Elect
