= April Weaver =

American politician

Member of the Alabama Senate from the 14th district
- Incumbent
- Assumed office July 14, 2021
- Preceded by: Cam Ward

Regional Director of the United States Department of Health and Human Services for Region IV
- In office May 12, 2020 – January 20, 2021
- President: Donald Trump

Member of the Alabama House of Representatives from the 49th district
- In office November 3, 2010 – May 12, 2020
- Preceded by: Cam Ward
- Succeeded by: Russell Bedsole

Personal details
- Born: April 13, 1971 (age 55) Alabaster, Alabama, U.S.
- Party: Republican
- Education: Shelton State Community College (ASN); University of Alabama (BS); Independence University (MBA)

April Weaver (born April 13, 1971) is an American politician and nurse serving as a member of the Alabama Senate from the 14th district. She previously served in the Alabama House of Representatives for the 49th district from 2010 to 2020.

== Education ==
Weaver earned a certificate in nursing from Kaplan University (now defunct), an associate degree in nursing from Shelton State Community College, a Bachelor of Science degree in business administration from University of Alabama, a Master of Business Administration from Independence University (now defunct), and an executive certificate in energy policy planning from the University of Idaho.

== Career ==
In 2010, Weaver was elected to the Alabama House of Representatives. She was reelected in 2012, 2014, 2016, and 2018. She resigned on May 12, 2020, to accept the position of Regional Director for Region IV (Alabama, Florida, Georgia, Kentucky, Mississippi, North Carolina, South Carolina, and Tennessee) of the United States Department of Health and Human Services in the Trump administration.

Weaver announced she would run in the special election to replace Cam Ward in the Alabama Senate, who announced he was resigning to become director of the Alabama Board of Pardons and Paroles. She won the Republican Primary with 82% of the vote and defeated Virginia Teague Applebaum in the general election. She assumed office on July 14, 2021.

In 2026 she became the first woman elected as majority leader of the Alabama state Senate.
