= 2002 Alabama gubernatorial election =

- November 5, 2002
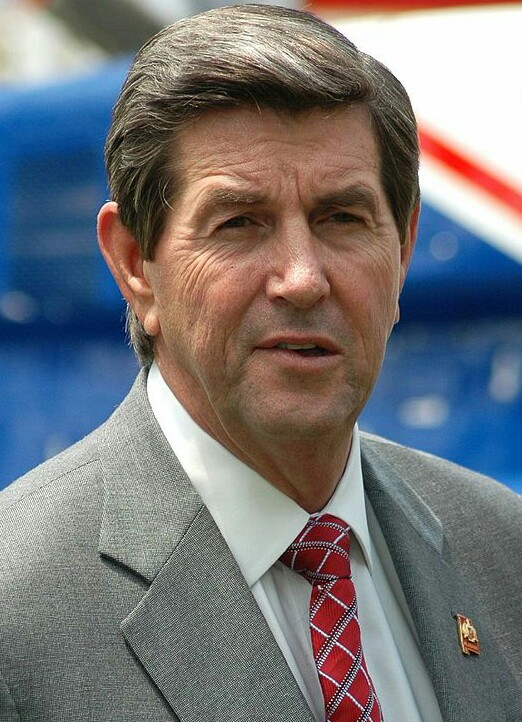

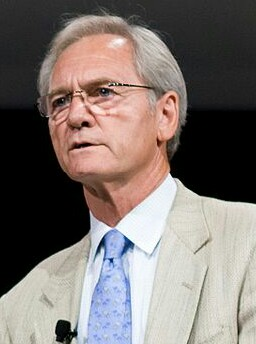
Nominee	Bob Riley	Don Siegelman
Party	Republican	Democratic
Popular vote	672,225	669,105
Percentage	49.17%	48.95%
- Riley: 40–50% 50–60% 60–70% Siegelman: 40–50% 50–60% 60–70% 70–80% 80–90%
Governor before election
Don Siegelman
Democratic
Elected Governor
Bob Riley
Republican

The 2002 Alabama gubernatorial election was held on November 5. With 669,105 votes or 48.95%, incumbent Democrat Don Siegelman lost re-election to Republican Bob Riley (who received 672,225 votes or 49.17%), a margin of 3,120 votes or 0.22%. The close and controversial election was marked by high turnout. This was the third consecutive Alabama gubernatorial election where the incumbent was defeated. Riley was sworn in on January 20, 2003, marking what is to date the last time the Alabama governor's office changed partisan control.

Primary elections were held on June 4. Both nominees faced less opposition than expected. Siegelman ran for governor of Alabama again in 2006, and lost the Democratic primary.

== Democratic primary ==
=== Candidates ===
==== Nominee ====
- Don Siegelman, incumbent governor

==== Eliminated in primary ====
- Charles Bishop, commissioner of agriculture and industries
- Blake W. Harper III, businessman
- Gladys Riddle, member of the Alabama Board of Pardons and Paroles
- Mark "Rodeo Clown" Townsend

=== Results ===
Democratic primary results by county Siegelman: 50–60%; 60–70%; 70–80%; 80–90%

Democratic primary results
Party	Candidate	Votes	%
Democratic	Don Siegelman (incumbent)	331,571	76.17
Democratic	Charles Bishop	80,193	18.42
Democratic	Mark "Rodeo Clown" Townsend	9,890	2.27
Democratic	Gladys Riddle	9,246	2.12
Democratic	Blake W. Harper III	4,410	1.01
Total votes		435,310	100.00

== Republican primary ==
=== Candidates ===
==== Nominee ====
- Bob Riley, U.S. representative for Alabama's 3rd Congressional district (1997–2003)

==== Eliminated in primary ====
- Tim James, businessman and son of former Governor Fob James
- Steve Windom, lieutenant governor

=== Results ===
Republican primary results by county Riley: 50–60%; 60–70%; 70–80%; 80–90%; >90%; James: 40–50%

Republican primary results
Party	Candidate	Votes	%
Republican	Bob Riley	262,851	73.53
Republican	Steve Windom	63,775	17.84
Republican	Tim James	30,871	8.64
Total votes		357,497	100.00

== General election ==
=== Campaign ===
The closeness of the general election contest was reflected in its intensity and fervor. A clash erupted between the two principal campaigns over disclosure of the identities of large contributors to the Riley campaign. President George W. Bush appeared in Alabama at a July event, and a private reception with a $50,000 admission was held to benefit the Riley campaign. Riley's campaign initially refused to identify the donors attending the event. Later, under pressure from the Siegelman campaign, Riley called on the national Republican Party, which had hosted the event, to release the names of donors. The Riley campaign was subjected to editorial criticism when the voluminous reports released made it difficult to trace the sources of donations from the event to Riley.

Actor and National Rifle Association president Charlton Heston came to Alabama to campaign for Republican congressional candidates. While in the state, Heston released a written statement endorsing Siegelman, despite the fact that Riley had made a point of being seen in public with Heston. Spokesmen for both Riley and the Alabama Republican Party issued statements insinuating that Siegelman had taken advantage of Heston's recently diagnosed Alzheimer's disease to secure the endorsement. After a firestorm of criticism from the NRA and editorial pages, the Republican spokesmen apologized to Heston, but not to Siegelman.

Riley received the endorsements of The Birmingham News, the Mobile Press-Register, the Business Council of Alabama, and the Auburn University Trustee Improvement PAC, an alumni group which opposed Siegelman's choices for trustees at the school (Siegleman re-appointed controversial trustee Bobby Lowder, notorious for constant interference in the university's affairs). In addition to the NRA, Siegelman was endorsed by The Montgomery Advertiser, The Anniston Star, The Tuscaloosa News, and various labor groups, including the Alabama State Employees Association. Siegelman was also endorsed by Alabama Education Association executive secretary Paul Hubbert, although the Association itself remained officially neutral.

The campaign set new spending records for an Alabama gubernatorial race. Even before the final weeks of the campaign, the candidates had raised over $17,000,000. Riley, who raised and spent over twice the sum Siegelman raised, was primarily backed by business groups and insurance companies. Siegelman received substantial contributions from labor groups and affiliates of the Alabama Education Association. Both candidates were the beneficiaries of national party funding, and contributions from political action committees made donations to both candidates difficult to trace.

Polls taken in the final days of the campaign reflected the eventual close outcome.

=== Debates ===
2002 Alabama gubernatorial debates
No.	Date	Host	Moderator	Link	Democratic	Republican
Key: P Participant A Absent N Not invited I Invited W Withdrawn						
Key: P Participant A Absent N Not invited I Invited W Withdrawn					Don Siegelman	Bob Riley
2	Aug. 5, 2002	Alabama Public Radio; The Birmingham News; The Huntsville Times; Mobile Register; Montgomery Advertiser	Tim Lennox	C-SPAN	P	P
2	Oct. 20, 2002	Alabama Public Television; Alabama Public Radio; The Birmingham News; The Huntsville Times; Montgomery Advertiser	Tim Lennox	C-SPAN	P	P

=== Predictions ===
Source	Ranking	As of
The Cook Political Report	Tossup	October 31, 2002
Sabato's Crystal Ball	Lean R (flip)	November 4, 2002

=== Results ===
Initial returns showed Riley narrowly losing to Siegelman. Siegelman gave a victory speech on election night, and the Associated Press initially declared him the winner.

However, officials in Baldwin County conducted a recount and retabulation of that county's votes after midnight, and after Democratic Party observers had gone home for the night. Approximately 6,000 votes initially credited to Siegelman were either removed from the total or reassigned to Riley in the recount, turning the statewide result in Riley's favor. Local Republican officials claimed the earlier returns were the result of a "computer glitch."

Democratic requests to repeat the recount with Democratic observers present were rejected by Alabama courts and then-Attorney General Bill Pryor. Siegelman and his supporters complained that these judges (and Pryor) were either elected as Republicans or appointed by Republican presidents. After over a week of fights in courtrooms and in the media, Siegelman, on November 18, 2002, made a televised address, saying, "I've decided that a prolonged election controversy would hurt Alabama, would hurt the very people that we worked so hard to help", and abandoned his efforts to secure a recount of the Baldwin County vote, allowing Riley to take office.

2002 Alabama gubernatorial election
Party	Candidate	Votes	%	±%
Republican	Bob Riley	672,225	49.17	+7.09
Democratic	Don Siegelman (incumbent)	669,105	48.95	−8.97
Libertarian	John Sophocleus	23,272	1.70	+1.70
Write-in		2,451	0.18	N/A
Total votes		1,367,053	100.00	N/A
Republican gain from Democratic				

==== Counties that flipped from Democratic to Republican ====
- Clarke (largest city: Jackson)
- Crenshaw (largest city: Luverne)
- Mobile (largest city: Mobile)
- Limestone (largest city: Athens)
- Butler (largest city: Greenville)
- Clay (largest city: Lineville)
- Cleburne (largest city: Heflin)
- Coffee (largest city: Enterprise)
- Cullman (largest city: Cullman)
- Dale (largest city: Brewton)
- Escambia (largest city: Atmore)
- Chambers (largest city: Valley)
- DeKalb (largest city: Fort Payne)
- Henry (largest city: Headland)
- Madison (largest city: Huntsville)
- Lee (largest city: Auburn)
- Marshall (largest city: Albertville)
- Monroe (largest city: Monroeville)
- Morgan (largest city: Decatur)
- Pike (largest city: Troy)
- Randolph (largest city: Roanoke)
- Tallapoosa (largest city: Alexander City)

=== Results by congressional district ===
Despite winning four out of seven congressional districts, Riley lost his old district by around 7% after it was redistricted to become more Democratic.

District	Bob Riley Republican	Don Siegelman Democratic	Representative
1st	56.17%	41.91%	Sonny Callahan (107th Congress)
1st	56.17%	41.91%	Jo Bonner (108th Congress)
2nd	54.11%	44.19%	Terry Everett
3rd	45.82%	52.55%	Bob Riley (107th Congress)
3rd	45.82%	52.55%	Mike Rogers (108th Congress)
4th	49.76%	48.00%	Robert Aderholt
5th	47.35%	50.06%	Robert E. Cramer
6th	62.49%	35.53%	Spencer Bachus
7th	26.24%	72.71%	Earl Hilliard (107th Congress)
7th	26.24%	72.71%	Artur Davis (108th Congress)

== Aftermath ==
Riley's victory was controversial and caused many commentators to recall the Florida election recount of 2000.

In response to the allegation of a "computer glitch", Siegelman later stated: "[N]ow one would expect that if there was some kind of computer glitch or some kind of computer programming error, that it might have affected more than one race, but it further raised suspicions about vote stealing when the votes came back and they were certified, and the only person who lost votes was Don Siegelman, the Democrat, and the only person who gained votes was Bob Riley, the Republican."

A number of analyses of the competing claims were undertaken at the time, with conflicting results. In one such study, Auburn University political scientist James H. Gundlach concluded that a detailed analysis of the returns, compared with 1998 results and returns from undisputed counties, "strongly suggests a systematic manipulation of the voting results." The Gundlach study also suggested a mechanism by which this could have been effected, and proposed a conclusion that Siegelman won. An earlier analysis reported by the Associated Press, using a less sophisticated comparison of gubernatorial and legislative returns, was claimed to indicate that the revised returns were more accurate, and that Riley probably won. The Gundlach paper offers a refutation of the conclusions of the Associated Press study.

Largely as a result of this controversy, the Alabama Legislature later amended the election code to provide for automatic, supervised recounts in close races.
