= September 24, 2005, anti-war protest =

Protests in the United States

September 24, 2005 anti-war protest
- Part of protests against the 2003 invasion of Iraq and the Iraq War took place
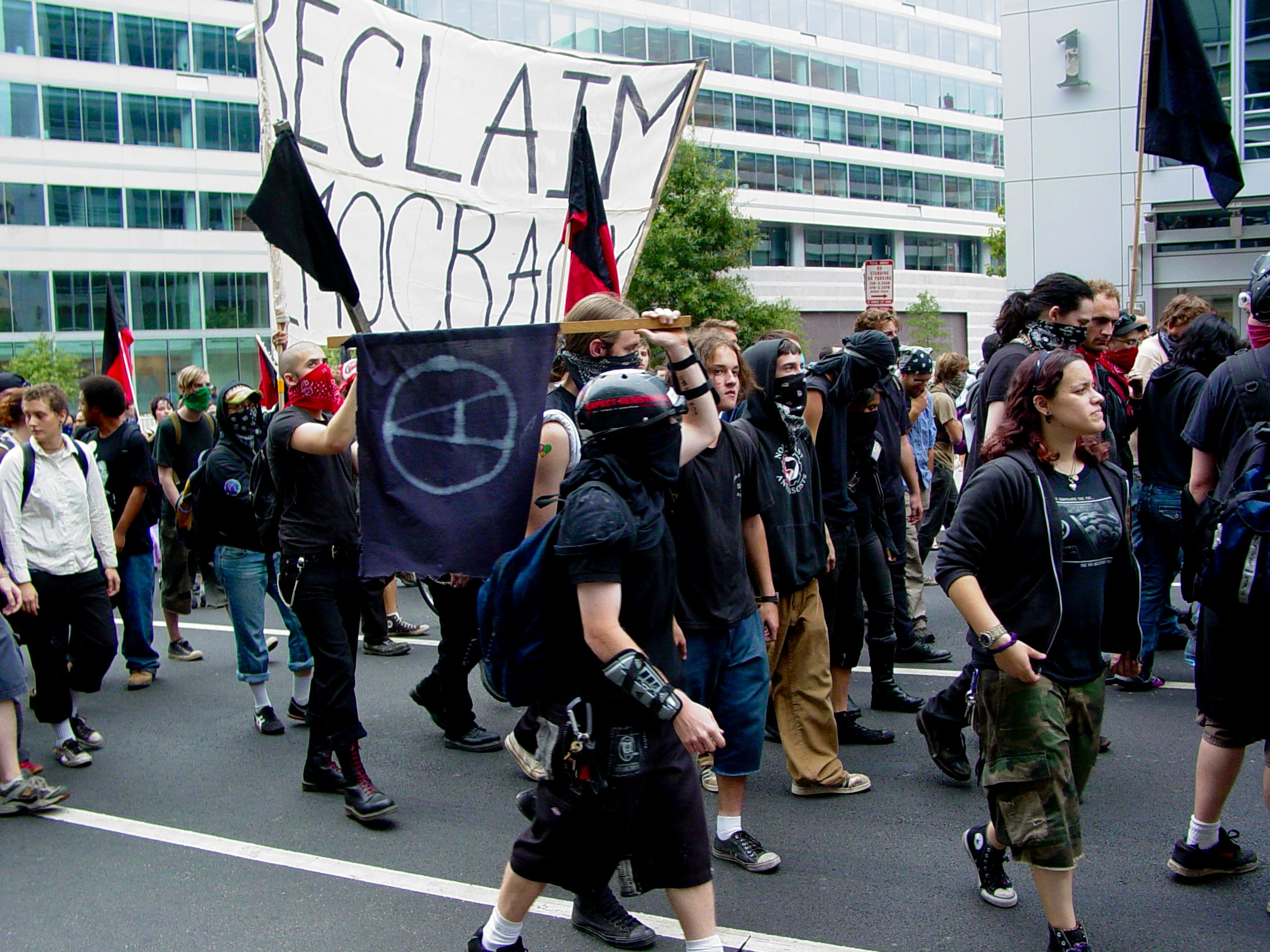
- Date: September 24, 2005

On September 24, 2005, many protests against the 2003 invasion of Iraq and the Iraq War took place. The September 24, 2005, anti-war protest was a significant event in the broader movement opposing the Iraq War. Recent reflections and analyses offer deeper insights into the impact and legacy of these protests: Global Protests Against the Iraq War: A collection of photographs showcases the worldwide demonstrations against the Iraq War, highlighting the global scale of opposition during that period.

== United States ==
=== Washington, D.C. ===
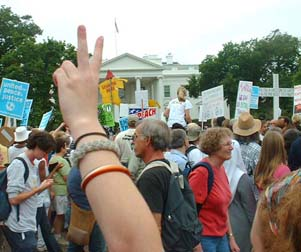
An anti-war protester shows a peace sign to the White House

Protesters from around the country joined the march in Washington, D.C. organized by ANSWER Coalition and United for Peace and Justice to promote peace and an end to the war in Iraq. Organizers claim that around 300,000 people attended the demonstration. Police said that 150,000 was "as good a guess as any". The demonstration route was chosen to be close to the White House, though President George W. Bush was away at the time.

Representative Cynthia McKinney, George Galloway, Carlos Arredondo, Cindy Sheehan, Jesse Jackson, and former U.S. Attorney General Ramsey Clark attended the rally.

The September 24 March also included over 300 members of Military Families Speak Out, which represents about 2,500 military families.

==== World Bank/IMF feeder march ====
In addition to the main rally and march sponsored by ANSWER and United for Peace and Justice, the Mobilization for Global Justice sponsored a feeder march to protest the policies of the World Bank and International Monetary Fund (IMF), held to coincide with the fall meetings of the World Bank and IMF, which were happening on the same weekend.

The feeder march met at Dupont Circle. In addition to more mainstream demonstrators, a large black bloc had gathered. This march from Dupont Circle did not have a march permit from the D.C. government, and as such, details of the actual march route were not disclosed until the last minute. Along with the crowd that had initially gathered, a second feeder march protesting the School of the Americas joined the World Bank/IMF group at Dupont Circle.

The Mobilization for Global Justice's feeder march ran from Dupont Circle down Connecticut Avenue and past Farragut Square, reaching Murrow Park and the World Bank. After marching west along H Street as far as 19th Street NW, encountering police barricades on three sides, the march did an about-face and marched east along H Street to Lafayette Square, joining the main march sponsored by ANSWER and UFPJ.

==== Black bloc breakaway march ====
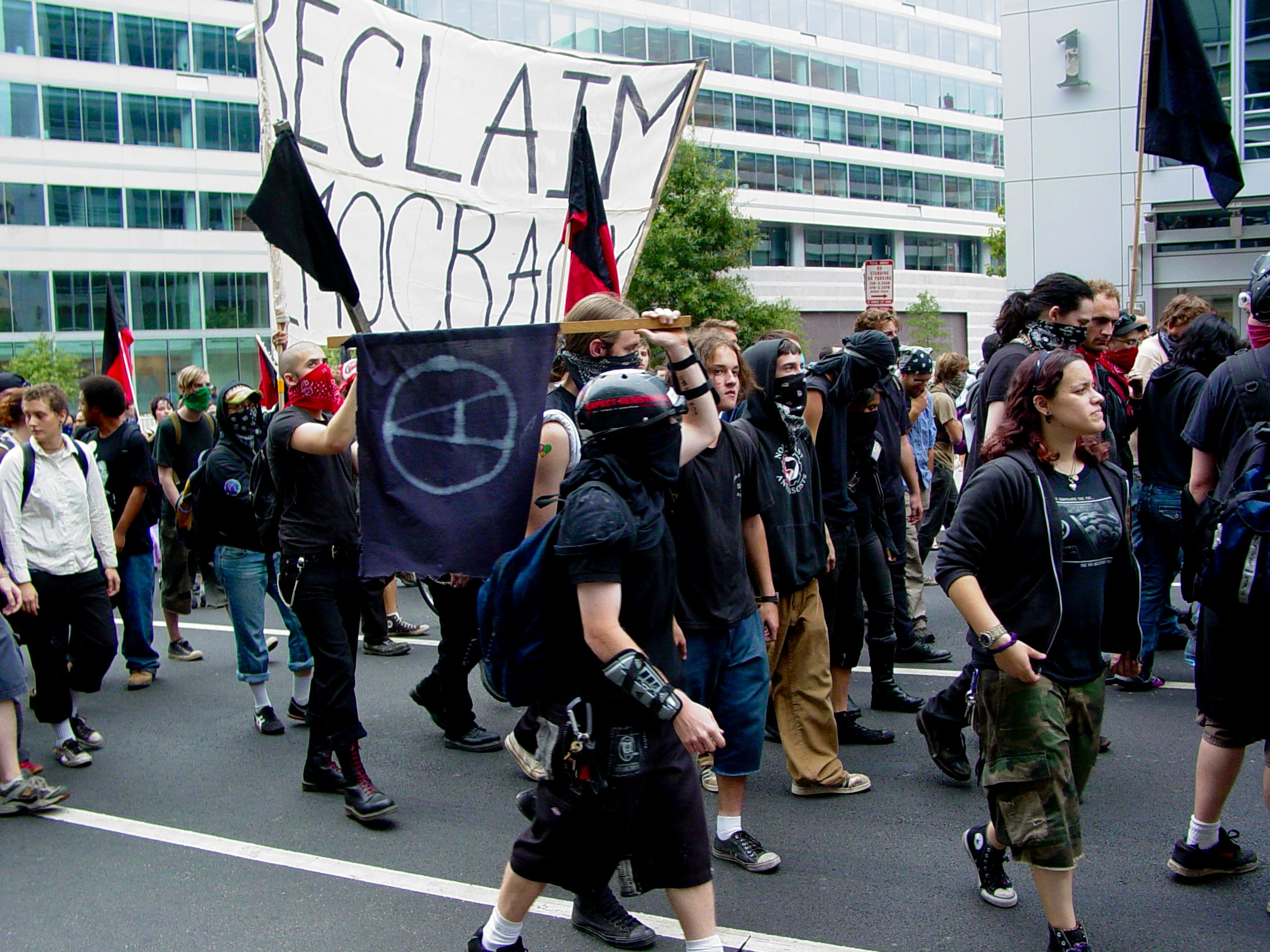
Participants in the Black Bloc breakaway march near the World Bank

Following the Mobilization for Global Justice's feeder march to the World Bank and then the White House, the Black Bloc began a separate, quite circuitous march through the streets of Washington, headed for the nearest recruitment center. Reaching the recruitment center, police began backfiring their motorcycle engines. A number of demonstrators unfamiliar with the tactic assumed that rubber bullets were being fired, and much of the Black Bloc scattered, seeking cover. With the main bloc reduced to around sixty people, the Black Bloc retreated, with many scattering newspaper boxes and trash receptacles in an attempt to slow police. The retreat ended when police charged through the group at 11th and K Streets NW.

=== Other U.S. cities ===
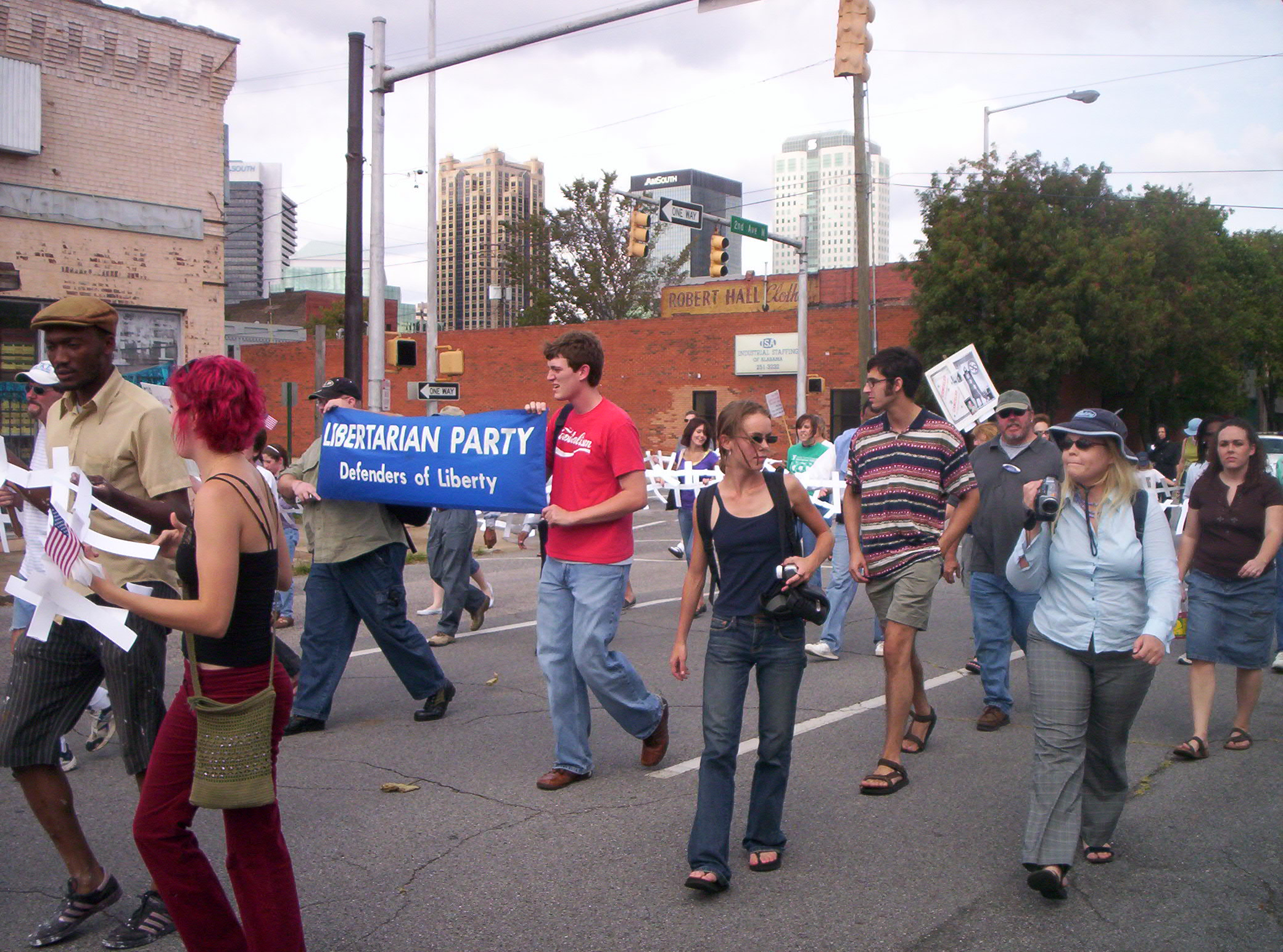
Anti-war protesters, including Libertarian Alabama gubernatorial candidate Loretta Nall, marching in Birmingham, Alabama

Several thousand attended a rally in Dolores Park in San Francisco and rallies were also held in Los Angeles, Seattle, and Birmingham, Alabama.

== United Kingdom ==
Thousands joined a march from Parliament Square to Hyde Park. Police estimate that 10,000 took part but organizers put the figure at 100,000. The demonstration was organised by the Stop the War Coalition, the Campaign for Nuclear Disarmament (CND) and the Muslim Association of Britain (MAB). The protest was organized to coincide with the protest in Washington, and to occur just before the beginning of that year's Labour Party Conference.

== Influence on Subsequent Protests ==
The momentum from the September 24 protest carried forward into other significant demonstrations. Notably, in March 2006, coordinated protests marked the third anniversary of the Iraq invasion, with major events in cities like Baghdad, London, New York, and Washington, D.C. These protests underscored the sustained public opposition to the war and the growing organizational capabilities of the anti-war movement.

== Media Representation and Public Perception ==
Media portrayal played a crucial role in shaping public perception of the anti-war protests. Some analyses suggest that mainstream media often framed these demonstrations within narratives of 'disorder' and 'spectacle,' potentially undermining the legitimacy of the protesters' messages. This framing highlights the challenges faced by the anti-war movement in conveying their stance to a broader audience.

== Strategic Evolution of the Anti-War Movement ==
In the aftermath of the September 24 protest, organizations like United for Peace and Justice (UFPJ) reflected on their strategies to enhance the effectiveness of their campaigns. Emphasizing the importance of building broad-based coalitions and forging alliances with military veterans and families, the movement sought to diversify its support base. Notably, a 2005 survey indicated that approximately 23% of Americans identified with the anti-war movement, translating to around 56 million individuals over the age of 16.

== Academic Perspectives on Protest Dynamics ==
Scholars have examined the internal dynamics of the anti-war protests, exploring themes such as desire and violence. For instance, Andrew Culp's work suggests 'queering' direct action to overcome the limitations of traditional rhetorical politics, offering a nuanced understanding of the motivations and strategies within the movement. The September 24, 2005, anti-war protest in Washington, D.C., stands as one of the most significant demonstrations against the Iraq War, with estimates suggesting that over 100,000 activists participated. This event not only showcased widespread public dissent but also highlighted the challenges and dynamics within the anti-war movement.

== Coalition Dynamics and Organizational Challenges ==
The protest was co-organized by prominent groups such as the ANSWER Coalition and United for Peace and Justice (UFPJ). Despite their shared goals, these organizations faced internal disagreements that sometimes hindered unified action. Research indicates that while both groups aimed to "Stop the War on Iraq" and "Bring the Troops Home Now," differing strategies and priorities occasionally led to coalition dissolution, affecting the movement's overall cohesion and effectiveness.

== Influence of Historical Protest Traditions ==
The 2005 protest drew inspiration from the rich legacy of 1960s activism. While the turnout was substantial, it was smaller compared to the massive anti-Vietnam War demonstration on November 15, 1969, which attracted over 250,000 activists. This comparison underscores both the enduring nature of protest traditions and the evolving contexts in which they occur.

== The Legacy of Anti-Iraq War Protests ==
An analysis discusses how the global protests against the Iraq War demonstrated the isolation of the Bush administration's policies and later influenced decisions to prevent conflicts in Iran in 2007 and Syria in 2013. These perspectives underscore the enduring significance of the anti-war protests and their influence on subsequent political and military decisions. The September 24, 5, anti-war protest was a pivotal moment in the broader movement opposing the Iraq War. This demonstration not only highlighted public dissent but also influenced subsequent anti-war strategies and actions.

== Law Enforcement and Protester Interactions ==
The Metropolitan Police Department's approach to the 2005 protests reflected a commitment to upholding First Amendment rights. A report by the Office of Police Complaints noted that the police force was well-prepared and adhered to standards that respected the demonstrators' rights, indicating a maturation in handling large-scale protests.

== Protesters' Demographics and Motivations ==
Surveys conducted during the September 24, 2005, protest revealed a diverse participant base, including both partisan and nonpartisan individuals. This diversity suggests that opposition to the Iraq War transcended traditional political affiliations, uniting a broad spectrum of citizens concerned about the war's implications. The September 24, 2005, anti-war protest in Washington, D.C., was a significant event in the broader movement opposing the Iraq War. This demonstration not only highlighted widespread public dissent but also influenced subsequent anti-war strategies and actions.

== Media Representation and Public Perception ==
Media portrayal played a crucial role in shaping public perception of the anti-war protests. Some analyses suggest that mainstream media often framed these demonstrations within narratives of 'disorder' and 'spectacle,' potentially undermining the legitimacy of the protesters' messages. This framing highlights the challenges faced by the anti-war movement in conveying their stance to a broader audience.

== Worldwide ==
Demonstrations were held in Florence, Rome, Paris and Madrid.

== See also ==
- Protests against the 2003 Iraq war
- List of protest marches on Washington, D.C.
- ANSWER Coalition
- United for Peace and Justice
- Veterans for Peace
- Iraq Veterans Against the War
