= Hal Nash =

American law enforcement officer

Chair of the Alabama Board of Pardons and Paroles
- Incumbent
- Assumed office July 14, 2025
- Appointed by: Kay Ivey
- Governor: Kay Ivey
- Preceded by: Leigh Gwathney

Personal details
- Born: 1951 or 1952 (age 73–74)

Hal Nash (born 1951 or 1952) is an American law enforcement officer who has served as the Chair of the Alabama Board of Pardons and Paroles since 2025. He previously worked with the Jackson County Sheriff's Office and the DeKalb County Sheriff's Office.

== Career ==
Nash worked in construction prior to attending the police academy in Chattanooga, Tennessee. He worked in various levels of law enforcement, serving as the chief corrections deputy of the Jackson County Sheriff’s Office when he was appointed by Kay Ivey to be the next chair of the Alabama Board of Pardons and Paroles. He was one of five names that was submitted by leaders in the Alabama Legislature. He succeeded Leigh Gwathney, who had received criticism for the low parole rate in the state. Steve Marshall recommended her reappointment, but Ivey selected Nash to serve as the next chair. Nash was officially sworn in on July 14, 2025.

The first board meetings held after his appointment saw an increase in the number of approved parole requests. Nash told AL.com that he wished to be a fair leader, and would not vote on cases that he was not familiar with. One of his stated goals is to expand the availability of parole for inmates. He was confirmed by the Alabama Senate in a unanimous vote on January 29, 2025, ensuring that he would continue in his role until the end of his term.
