= Riley Seibenhener =

American politician

Member of the Alabama House of Representatives from the 87th district
- In office November 9, 1994 – November 6, 2002
- Preceded by: Nathan Mathis
- Succeeded by: Warren Beck

Personal details
- Born: March 12, 1949 (age 77)
- Party: Republican

Riley Seibenhener (born March 12, 1949) is an American politician who served in the Alabama House of Representatives from the 87th district from 1994 to 2002.
