= Steve Windom =

American politician

27th Lieutenant Governor of Alabama
- In office January 18, 1999 – January 20, 2003
- Governor: Don Siegelman
- Preceded by: Don Siegelman
- Succeeded by: Lucy Baxley

Member of the Alabama Senate from the 35th district
- In office March 1989 – November 4, 1998
- Preceded by: Bill Menton
- Succeeded by: George Callahan

Personal details
- Born: Stephen Ralph Windom; November 6, 1949 (age 77) Florence, South Carolina, U.S.
- Party: Republican (1997–present); Democratic (until 1997)
- Spouses: Cathy Conditt; Mary Becker
- Children: 2
- Education: University of Alabama (BS, JD)

Stephen Ralph Windom (born November 6, 1949) is an American attorney and politician who served as member of the Alabama State Senate from 1989 to 1998 and as the 27th lieutenant governor of Alabama from 1999 to 2003.

Windom's political career began in the Alabama State Senate, where he served for two terms and an initial partial term decided by a special election. In 1997, he switched his party affiliation from Democratic to Republican.

In 1998, Windom was elected Lieutenant Governor, becoming the first Republican Lieutenant Governor of Alabama since Reconstruction. He served under Democratic Governor Don Siegelman as Alabama's Governor and Lieutenant Governor are elected separately. He did not run for re-election in 2002, instead running for Governor. He lost in the Republican primary to Congressman Bob Riley and subsequently returned to the private sector.

== Early life and education ==
Windom was born in Florence, South Carolina. He graduated from Sidney Lanier High School. He then received his B.S. and J.D. degrees from the University of Alabama. In 1974, he moved near Mobile, Alabama and began to practice law.

== Career ==
=== State Senate ===
He was first elected as a Democrat to the Alabama State Senate in 1989. During his time in the Senate, he was selected to be the Banking and Insurance Committee chairman for 8 years. Although his first two terms were as a Democrat, he switched to the Republican Party in 1997 for his last term as a legislator.

He was a delegate for Bill Clinton at the 1992 Democratic National Convention. He was a delegate for George Bush at the 2000 Republican National Convention, and served as co-chair of the Alabama Bush-Cheney campaign.

While in office, Windom was selected Conservation Legislator of the Year by the Alabama Wildlife Federation in 1995, Legislator of the Year by the National Federation of Independent Business in 1996, and Legislator of the Year in 1997 by the Independent Insurance Agents. After his career in the Senate, he joined the Sirote Permutt lawfirm. He also ran for the position of Lieutenant Governor.

=== Lieutenant governor ===
Windom's 1998 campaign for Lieutenant Governor was marked by scandal when false allegations involving a prostitute were made against him by supporters of his opponent. Garve Ivey, an Alabama plaintiffs' attorney, was eventually convicted of witness tampering and criminal defamation for conspiring with private investigator Wes Chappell to defame Windom. A former call girl, who had been paid to make false allegations, testified at the trial. Despite the efforts to publicly malign him, Windom was elected. He thus became the first Republican Lieutenant Governor of Alabama since Reconstruction. The last Republican to hold the office was Alexander McKinstry, who served from 1872 to 1874.

Windom gained notoriety in 1999 for discreetly urinating into a jug behind his desk while presiding over the Senate, purportedly to avoid being stripped of most of his powers as presiding officer by the Democratic majority while going to the bathroom.

Windom did not run for reelection in 2002, instead running for Governor. He was defeated in the 2002 primary by then-Congressman Bob Riley in a landslide. Riley went on to defeat Governor Siegelman by a very narrow margin.

=== Subsequent career ===
After leaving public office, Windom opened a legal and lobbying practice, Steve Windom, LLC. In the Republican primary on June 3, 2008, Windom's wife, Mary Becker Windom, was elected to a seat on the Alabama Court of Criminal Appeals. She became the Court's Presiding Judge in 2012.

== Personal life ==
Windom and his first wife Cathy Conditt Windom have two sons Robert and Thomas. He and his second wife, Mary Becker, have no children

== Electoral history ==
2002 Republican Primary: Governor

Candidate	Votes Received	Percentage
Bob Riley	262,851	73.5%
Steve Windom	63,775	17.8%
Tim James	30,871	8.6%

1998 General Election: Lieutenant Governor

Candidate	Votes Received	Percentage
Steve Windom (R)	652,465	50.3%
Dewayne Freeman (D)	644,818	49.7%

1998 Republican Primary: Lieutenant Governor

Candidate	Votes Received	Percentage
Steve Windom	178,065	52.8%
John Amari	159,006	47.2%

Party political offices
Preceded by Charles Graddick	Republican nominee for Lieutenant Governor of Alabama; 1998	Succeeded by Bill Armistead
Political offices
Preceded by Don Siegelman	Lieutenant Governor of Alabama; 1999–2003	Succeeded by Lucy Baxley
