= Alabama Bureau of Pardons and Paroles =

Government Agency in Alabama, US

Agency overview
- Agency executive: Cam Ward, Director
- Website: paroles.alabama.gov

The Alabama Bureau of Pardons and Paroles is a department of the government of Alabama. Cam Ward currently serves as director of the organization. It manages the Alabama Board of Pardons and Paroles, which is currently chaired by Hal Nash.

The Bureau has been nationally recognized for its work to reduce recidivism.
