= Alabama's 14th Senate district =

Alabama's 14th State Senate district
Senator
April Weaver; R–Pelham
- Demographics: 73.4% White; 14.4% Black; 7.8% Hispanic; 1.1% Asian
- Population (2022): 141,911

Alabama's 14th Senate district is one of 35 districts in the Alabama Senate. The district has been represented by April Weaver since a special election in 2021.

== Geography ==
Election	Map	Counties in District
2026; 2022		Bibb, portions of Chilton, Shelby
2018		Bibb, portions of Chilton, Shelby
2014		Bibb, portions of Chilton, Hale, Jefferson, Shelby
2010; 2006; 2002		Chilton, portions of Bibb, Jefferson, Shelby

== Election history ==
=== Elections in the 2020s ===
Alabama Senate election, 2022: Senate District 14
Party	Candidate	Votes	%	±%
Republican	April Weaver (Incumbent)	31,917	97.40	+17.15
Write-in		852	2.60	+2.46
Majority		31,065	94.80	+34.15
Turnout		32,769		
Republican hold				

Alabama Senate District 14 special election - 13 July 2021
Party	Candidate	Votes	%	±%
Republican	April Weaver	6,234	80.25	+7.68
Democratic	Virginia Teague Applebaum	1,523	19.61	−7.74
Write-in		11	0.14	+0.06
Majority		4,711	60.65	+15.43
Turnout		7,768		
Republican hold				

=== Elections in the 2010s ===
Alabama Senate election, 2018: Senate District 14
Party	Candidate	Votes	%	±%
Republican	Cam Ward (Incumbent)	34,957	72.57	−25.84
Democratic	Jerry McDonald	13,173	27.35	+27.35
Write-in		39	0.08	-1.51
Majority		21,784	45.22	−51.60
Turnout		48,169		
Republican hold				

Alabama Senate election, 2014: Senate District 14
Party	Candidate	Votes	%	±%
Republican	Cam Ward (Incumbent)	25,724	98.41	−0.52
Write-in		415	1.59	+0.52
Majority		25,309	96.82	−1.04
Turnout		26,139		
Republican hold				

Alabama Senate election, 2010: Senate District 14
Party	Candidate	Votes	%	±%
Republican	Cam Ward	42,511	98.93	+1.45
Write-in		460	1.07	-1.45
Majority		42,051	97.86	+2.90
Turnout		42,971		
Republican hold				

=== Elections in the 2000s ===
Alabama Senate election, 2006: Senate District 14
Party	Candidate	Votes	%	±%
Republican	Hank Erwin (Incumbent)	30,820	97.48	−1.19
Write-in		797	2.52	+1.19
Majority		30,023	94.96	−2.37
Turnout		31,617		
Republican hold				

Alabama Senate election, 2002: Senate District 14
Party	Candidate	Votes	%	±%
Republican	Hank Erwin	33,936	98.67	+23.95
Write-in		459	1.33	+1.26
Majority		33,477	97.33	
Turnout		34,395		
Republican hold				

=== Elections in the 1990s ===
Alabama Senate election, 1998: Senate District 14
Party	Candidate	Votes	%	±%
Republican	Bill Armistead (Incumbent)	33,491	74.72	+10.50
Democratic	Carl R. Robinson	11,301	25.21	−10.51
Write-in		29	0.07	+0.01
Majority		22,190	49.51	+21.02
Turnout		44,821		
Republican hold				

Alabama Senate election, 1994: Senate District 14
Party	Candidate	Votes	%	±%
Republican	Bill Armistead	25,536	64.22	−4.67
Democratic	Walter Owens	14,206	35.72	+4.69
Write-in		23	0.06	-0.02
Majority		11,330	28.49	
Turnout		39,765		
Republican hold				

Alabama Senate election, 1990: Senate District 14
Party	Candidate	Votes	%	±%
Republican	Frank Ellis Jr. (Incumbent)	30,254	68.89	+68.89
Democratic	Sonny Moore	13,625	31.03	−68.97
Write-in		36	0.08	+0.08
Majority		16,629	37.87	−62.13
Turnout		43,915		
Republican gain from Democratic				

=== Elections in the 1980s ===
Alabama Senate election, 1986: Senate District 14
Party	Candidate	Votes	%	±%
Democratic	Frank Ellis Jr. (Incumbent)	24,414	100.00	+37.13
Majority		24,414	100.00	+74.26
Turnout		24,414		
Democratic hold				

Ellis joined the Republican Party in 1989.

Alabama Senate election, 1983: Senate District 14
Party	Candidate	Votes	%	±%
Democratic	Frank Ellis Jr.	8,354	62.87	−37.13
Republican	Don Murphy	4,934	37.13	+37.13
Majority		3,420	25.74	−74.26
Turnout		13,288		
Democratic hold				

Alabama Senate election, 1982: Senate District 14
Party	Candidate	Votes	%	±%
Democratic	Mac Parsons (Incumbent)	20,561	100.00	
Majority		20,561	100.00	
Turnout		20,561		
Democratic hold				

== District officeholders ==
Senators take office at midnight on the day of their election.

- April Weaver (2021–present)
- Cam Ward (2010–2020)
- Hank Erwin (2002–2010)
- Bill Armistead (1994–2002)
- Frank Ellis Jr. (1983–1994)
- Mac Parsons (1978–1983)
- Robert Ellis Jr. (1974–1978)
- Walter C. Givhan (1966–1974)
- B. G. Robison Jr. (1962–1966)
- Aubrey Green (1958–1962)
- Albert Davis (1954–1958)
