= Terry Lathan =

American politician

Chair of the Alabama Republican Party
- In office February 21, 2015 – February 27, 2021
- Preceded by: Bill Armistead
- Succeeded by: John Wahl

Personal details
- Party: Republican
- Education: Auburn University, Montgomery (BA)

Terry Lathan is an American political activist, strategist and former teacher. She served as chair of the Alabama Republican Party from 2015 to 2021.

== Early life ==
Lathan worked as a public school teacher in Mobile, Alabama. She served on the board of directors of the Boys and Girls Club of Greater South Alabama.

== Political positions ==
=== LGBT rights ===
Lathan opposes same-sex marriage.

=== Abortion ===
Lathan opposes abortion and supports pro-life legislation. In 2013, she endorsed a bill which would have regulated abortion clinics.

== Personal life ==
She is married to Jerry Lathan, the former Finance Chair of the Alabama Republican Party. They have a son and a daughter. They attend Christ United Methodist Church.

Party political offices
| Preceded by Bill Armistead | Chair of the Alabama Republican Party; 2015–2021 | Succeeded by John Wahl |
