= 2006 Alabama gubernatorial election =

- November 7, 2006
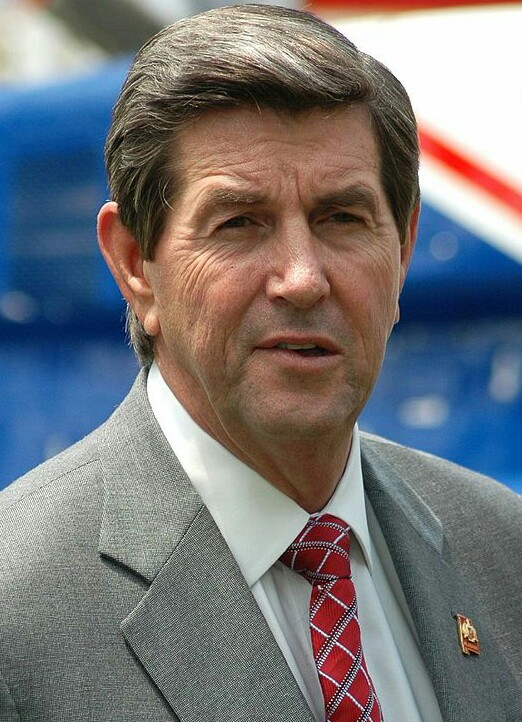

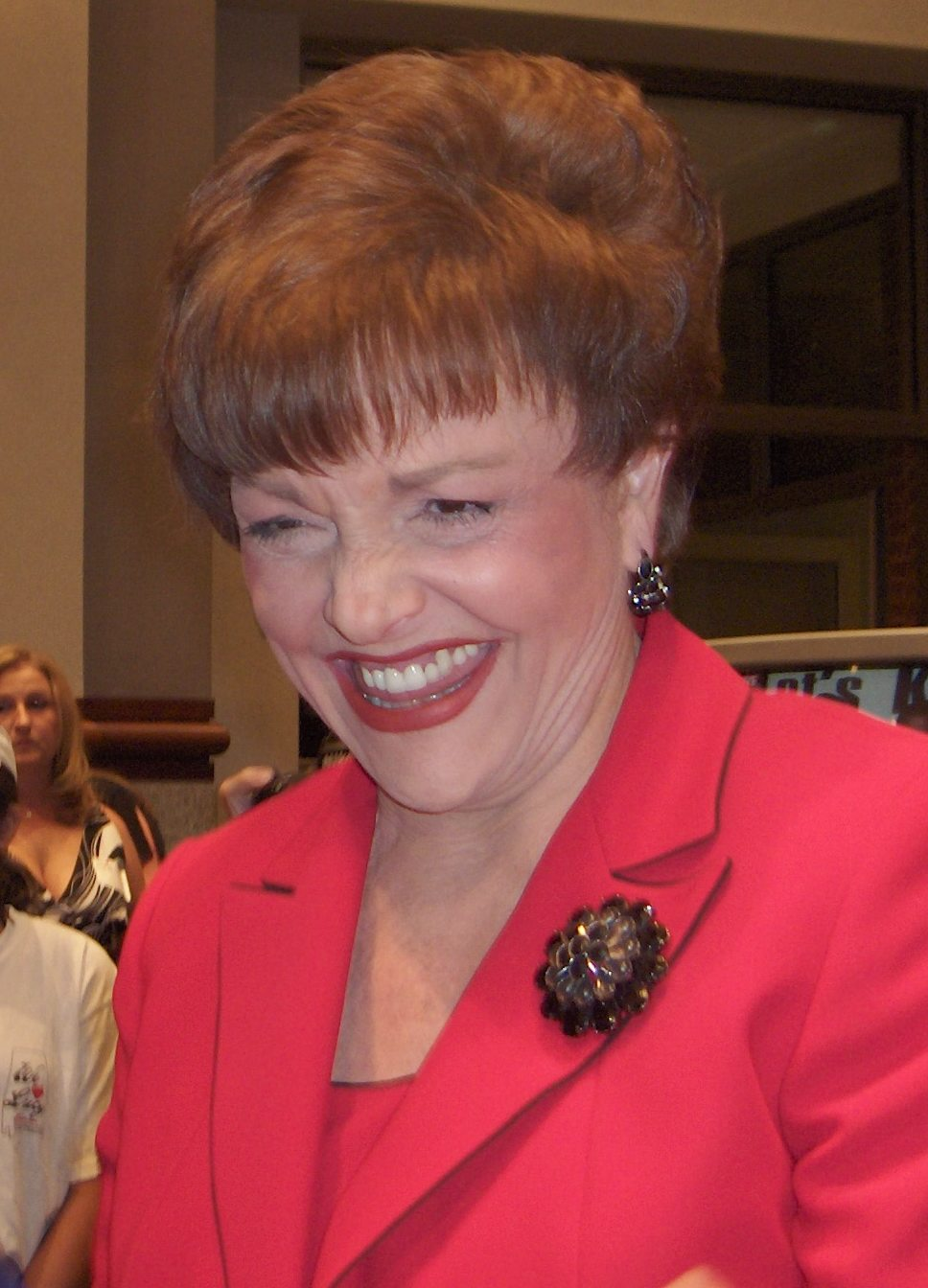
Nominee	Bob Riley	Lucy Baxley
Party	Republican	Democratic
Popular vote	718,327	519,827
Percentage	57.45%	41.57%
- County results Riley: 40–50% 50–60% 60–70% 70–80% Baxley: 40–50% 50–60% 60–70% 70–80%
Governor before election
Bob Riley
Republican
Elected Governor
Bob Riley
Republican

The 2006 Alabama gubernatorial election occurred on November 7, 2006. Incumbent Republican Governor Bob Riley defeated Democratic Lieutenant Governor Lucy Baxley. Riley garnered 21% of African Americans' votes.

Riley was the first Republican to carry the counties Bibb, Cherokee, Etowah, Jackson, and Lauderdale since Reconstruction. This is the last time gubernatorial nominee and a lieutenant gubernatorial nominee of different political parties were elected in Alabama.

== Primary elections ==
=== Republican Party ===
- Bob Riley, incumbent Governor of Alabama
- Roy Moore, former Chief Justice of the Alabama Supreme Court

==== Polling ====
Source	Date	Bob Riley	Roy Moore
Survey USA	June 5, 2006	64%	33%
Survey USA	May 25, 2006	64%	33%
Press-Register/University of South Alabama Poll	May 24, 2006	69%	20%
Survey USA	May 2, 2006	66%	30%

==== Results ====
Republican primary results by county Riley: 50–60%; 60–70%; 70–80%; 80–90%; Moore: 50–60%; 60–70%

Republican primary results
Party	Candidate	Votes	%
Republican	Bob Riley (incumbent)	306,665	66.66%
Republican	Roy Moore	153,354	33.34%
Total votes		460,019	100.00%

=== Democratic Party ===
- Lucy Baxley, Lieutenant Governor
- Don Siegelman, former Governor
- Joe Copeland, teacher
- Nathan Mathis, former State Representative
- Katherine Mack, minister
- James Potts, financial advisor
- Harry Lyon, perennial candidate

==== Polling ====
Source	Date	Don Siegelman	Lucy Baxley
Survey USA	June 5, 2006	41%	46%
Press-Register/University of South Alabama Poll	May 28, 2006	27%	45%
Survey USA	May 25, 2006	43%	43%
Survey USA	May 2, 2006	47%	39%

==== Results ====
Democratic primary results by county Baxley: 40–50%; 50–60%; 60–70%; 70–80%; Siegelman: 50–60%; 60–70%

Democratic primary results
Party	Candidate	Votes	%
Democratic	Lucy Baxley	279,165	59.84%
Democratic	Don Siegelman	170,016	36.44%
Democratic	Joe Copeland	4,141	0.89%
Democratic	Nathan Mathis	4,000	0.86%
Democratic	Katherine Mack	3,392	0.73%
Democratic	James Potts	3,333	0.71%
Democratic	Harry Lyon	2,490	0.53%
Total votes		466,537	100.00%

== General election ==
=== Candidates ===
- Bob Riley (Republican), incumbent Governor of Alabama
- Lucy Baxley (Democratic), Lieutenant Governor of Alabama, former Alabama State Treasurer
- Loretta Nall (Libertarian; write-in), founder of the United States Marijuana Party
- Nathan Mathis (write-in), former State Representative
- Michael A. Polemeni (write-in), Huntsville/Madison County Chapter President of Alabama Family Rights Association

=== Predictions ===
Source	Ranking	As of
The Cook Political Report	Solid R	November 6, 2006
Sabato's Crystal Ball	Safe R	November 6, 2006
Rothenberg Political Report	Safe R	November 2, 2006
Real Clear Politics	Safe R	November 6, 2006

=== Polling ===
Source	Date	Lucy Baxley (D)	Bob Riley (R)
Survey USA	November 1, 2006	39%	54%
Survey USA	October 18, 2006	36%	57%
Survey USA	September 28, 2006	38%	54%
Rasmussen	August 8, 2006	35%	55%
Survey USA	July 26, 2006	38%	52%
Rasmussen	June 22, 2006	40%	54%
Survey USA	June 20, 2006	40%	51%
Press-Register/University of South Alabama poll	June 18, 2006	25%	53%
Rasmussen	May 9, 2006	37%	49%
Rasmussen	April 17, 2006	40%	47%
Rasmussen	February 27, 2006	37%	53%
Rasmussen	February 8, 2006	40%	47%

=== Endorsements ===
Lucy Baxley (D)

Individuals

- Wesley Clark, General, 2004 democratic presidential candidate

=== Results ===
2006 Alabama gubernatorial election
Party	Candidate	Votes	%	±%
Republican	Bob Riley (incumbent)	718,327	57.45%	+8.27%
Democratic	Lucy Baxley	519,827	41.57%	−7.37%
Write-in		12,247	0.98%	N/A
Total votes		1,250,401	100.00%	N/A
Republican hold				

==== Counties that flipped from Democratic to Republican ====
- Cherokee (Largest city: Centre)
- Etowah (Largest city: Gadsden)
- Pickens (Largest city: Aliceville)
- Washington (Largest city: Chatom)
- Tuscaloosa (largest city: Tuscaloosa)
- Jackson (Largest city: Scottsboro)
- Jefferson (largest city: Birmingham)
- Montgomery (Largest city: Montgomery)
- Calhoun (largest city: Oxford)
- Lauderdale (Largest city: Florence)
- Bibb (largest city: Brent)
- Fayette (Largest city: Fayette)

== See also ==
- 2006 United States gubernatorial elections
- State of Alabama
- Governors of Alabama
