= John Sophocleus =

American economist

John Peter Sophocleus

Personal details
- Party: Libertarian

John Peter Sophocleus is an American economist and libertarian political activist.

== Career in economics ==
Sophocleus has taught economics at Clemson University, Auburn University, and Auburn University Montgomery. He has been twice nominated to the Who's Who Among American Teachers. He is an adjunct faculty member of the Mises Institute and occasionally lectures there, usually on United States tariff history. Sophocleus generally teaches the principles of microeconomics.

His 1988 article "The Social Cost of Rent-seeking" with David Laband, published in Public Choice, has been cited by Peter Leeson, Gordon Tullock and others.

== Political efforts ==
In 1996, he was the Libertarian Party candidate for U.S. House of Representatives in Alabama's 3rd congressional district, opposing Republican Bob Riley.

In 2002, Sophocleus entered the Alabama gubernatorial race on the Libertarian Party of Alabama's ticket against incumbent Don Siegelman and previous opponent Bob Riley. In the 2002 race, which was one of the closest in Alabama's history, Sophocleus received 23,242 votes (~2%), a number which was greater than the margin of victory in the race.

According to a 16 November 2002 New York Times editorial by John J. Miller:

The only reason the governor's race in Alabama was so close this year as to be disputed beyond election night was that the Libertarian candidate, John Sophocleus, attracted 23,000 votes.

On 8 June 2006, in the wake of Stephen P. Gordon's acceptance of a position with the national Libertarian Party and subsequent resignation from the LPA Executive Committee, Sophocleus was named Vice-Chairman of the Libertarian Party of Alabama.

In May 2022, Sophocleus was nominated by the Libertarian Party for the 2022 United States Senate election in Alabama after the party gained ballot access in the general election.

== Eminent domain conflict ==
Beginning in 1998, Sophocleus was involved in litigation with the State of Alabama, the Alabama Department of Transportation, and others over the eminent domain seizure of his US Highway 280 home, near The Bottle, Alabama. Sophocleus contended that the state acted improperly by evicting him and allowing highway workers to live in his house for several months (while he still held legal title to the home) rather than immediately demolishing it as was stated would happen in United States district court.

== Notes ==
Party political offices
Preceded by Henry Klingler	Libertarian Party nominee for Governor of Alabama; 2002 (3rd)	Succeeded by Loretta Nall
