= George Wallace Jr. =

American politician

Alabama Public Service Commission (Seat 2)
- In office 1999–2007
- Preceded by: Charles B. Martin
- Succeeded by: Susan Parker

36th Alabama State Treasurer
- In office 1987–1995
- Governor: H. Guy Hunt; Jim Folsom Jr.
- Preceded by: Annie Laurie Gunter
- Succeeded by: Lucy Baxley

Personal details
- Born: George Corley Wallace III; October 17, 1951 (age 74) Eufaula, Alabama, U.S.
- Party: Republican (1998–present)
- Other political affiliations: Democratic (before 1998)
- Spouse(s): 1 previous marriage (divorced) Kelley Wallace (divorced) Angela Dawn Shoemaker (m. 1990; div. 1991) Elizabeth Grimes Maynor (m. 2000)
- Children: 2
- Parent(s): George Wallace; Lurleen Burns
- Education: Huntingdon College; Auburn University
- Occupation: College administrator

George Corley Wallace III, generally known as George Wallace Jr., (born October 17, 1951) is an American politician from the U.S. state of Alabama. He is the only son of George and Lurleen Wallace, both of whom served as governor of Alabama.

== Early life and education ==
Wallace was born in Eufaula in Barbour County in southeastern Alabama as the only son of George and Lurleen Wallace, future governors of Alabama. His sisters are Bobbi Jo Wallace Parsons, Peggy Sue Wallace Kennedy, and Janie Lee Wallace Dye. His father was a noted segregationist who ran for President of the United States on four occasions. His mother succeeded her husband as governor following his first term, and served as a surrogate for him until her death from uterine cancer in 1968.

Wallace lived in the Alabama Governor's Mansion in Montgomery during his parents' terms as governor from 1963 to 1968, after which he lived with relatives. In the seventh grade, he was clipped playing football and sustained an injury for which he was hospitalized. He graduated in 1970 from Sidney Lanier High School in Montgomery, completed a bachelor's degree in history at Huntingdon College in Montgomery in 1976, and did graduate work in political science and public administration at Auburn University in Auburn.

== Personal life ==
Wallace had two sons from his second marriage, to Kelley Wallace: George Corley Wallace IV and Robert Kelly Wallace. George IV died on May 12, 2009, at the age of 25 from a self-inflicted gunshot wound. Beforehand, Wallace was married for less than a year to an unknown woman. In June 1990, he married Angela Dawn Shoemaker, only to divorce in less than 11 months. After marrying Elizabeth Grimes Maynor in 2000, Wallace gained two stepdaughters.

== Career ==
From 1978 to 1987, Wallace worked at Troy University in Troy, Alabama. He was the director of financial aid and alumni affairs from 1978 to 1982. From 1983 to 1987, he was vice president of development and alumni affairs. During part of the time he was at Troy, the faculty included Max Rafferty, former California Superintendent of Public Instruction, and former Governor John Malcolm Patterson, an intraparty opponent of both of his parents.

In 1986, Wallace was elected Alabama State Treasurer, narrowly winning the Democratic Party primary and runoff over Jim Zeigler and facing no opposition in the general election. He was easily reelected in 1990. In 1992, midway through his second term, Wallace ran for the U.S. House of Representatives in Alabama's 2nd congressional district, his family's home district, to succeed retiring 28-year Republican incumbent Bill Dickinson. He narrowly missed avoiding a runoff in the primary, but prevailed over state welfare commissioner Faye Baggiano, who had nearly toppled Dickinson in the 1990 election.

The district had been made more Republican on paper after most of its African-American constituents had been drawn into the black-majority 7th district after the 1990 census in accordance with the Voting Rights Act of 1965. However, Wallace's chances got a significant boost after his expected Republican opponent, State Senator Larry Dixon, lost his primary to Terry Everett, a newspaper publisher from the Wiregrass region who had never run for office before. In November, Wallace lost the election in an upset to Everett by just 3,571 votes, less than 1 percent.

In 1994, while wrapping up his second term as state treasurer, Wallace ran for lieutenant governor, but finished third behind Don Siegelman and Ryan DeGraffenried Jr. (DeGraffenried's father, Ryan DeGraffenried Sr., was defeated in the 1962 Democratic gubernatorial runoff by Wallace's father). After leaving the treasurer's office, Wallace worked at the Center for Government and Public Affairs at Auburn University Montgomery.

In 1998, Wallace switched affiliations to the GOP and was elected in 1998 to the Alabama Public Service Commission (Position 2), having defeated incumbent Democrat Charles B. Martin. He was reelected commissioner in 2002 but did not run again in 2006, when the Republicans nominated former state Representative Perry Hooper Jr., of Montgomery. Hooper defeated former state Senator John Amari of Trussville in the Republican primary but then lost the general election to Democrat Susan Parker.

In June 2005 Wallace opened the annual national convention of the Council of Conservative Citizens (CofCC), a white nationalist organization. This was not Wallace's first interaction with the CofCC; he gave speeches to the CofCC once in 1998 and twice in 1999. He has also appeared as a guest on The Political Cesspool, a radio talk show that is affiliated with the Tennessee chapter of the CofCC.

Wallace instead sought in 2006 the Republican nomination for lieutenant governor and entered a runoff election with Birmingham attorney Luther Strange. Wallace lost by ten points despite appearances on his behalf from U.S. Senator John McCain of Arizona. Strange, in turn, lost the general election to Democratic nominee Jim Folsom Jr. of Cullman, a son of former Governor Jim Folsom who had previously served as both lieutenant governor and governor. In 2010, Wallace ran in the Republican primary to reclaim his old office of state treasurer, but lost the nomination to banker Young Boozer by nearly thirty points.

Party political offices
Preceded by Annie Laurie Gunter	Democratic nominee for Alabama State Treasurer; 1986, 1990	Succeeded by Lucy Baxley
Political offices
Preceded by Annie Laurie Gunter	Alabama State Treasurer; 1987–1995	Succeeded by Lucy Baxley
Preceded by Charles B. Martin	Alabama Public Service Commission (Seat 2); 1999–2007	Succeeded by Susan Parker
