= Lucy Baxley =

American politician (1937–2016)

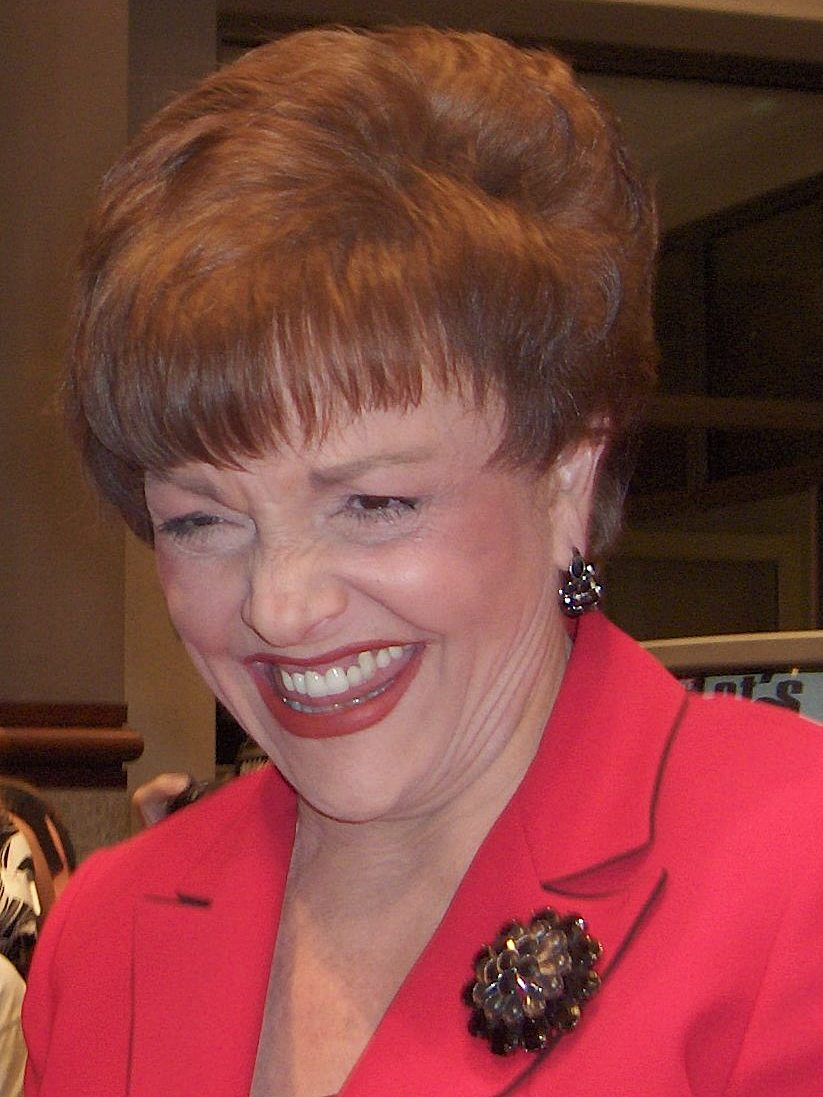
- Baxley in 2006

President of the Alabama Public Service Commission
- In office November 5, 2008 – November 7, 2012
- Governor: Bob Riley; Robert J. Bentley
- Preceded by: Jim Sullivan
- Succeeded by: Twinkle Andress Cavanaugh

28th Lieutenant Governor of Alabama
- In office January 20, 2003 – January 15, 2007
- Governor: Bob Riley
- Preceded by: Steve Windom
- Succeeded by: Jim Folsom

37th Treasurer of Alabama
- In office January 16, 1995 – January 20, 2003
- Governor: Fob James; Don Siegelman
- Preceded by: George Wallace Jr.
- Succeeded by: Kay Ivey

Second Lady of Alabama
- In office January 17, 1983 – January 19, 1987
- Preceded by: Ann Louise Dial McMillan
- Succeeded by: Marsha Guthrie Folsom

Personal details
- Born: Lucy Mae Bruner; December 21, 1937 Pansey, Alabama, U.S.
- Died: October 14, 2016 (aged 78) Birmingham, Alabama, U.S.
- Party: Democratic
- Spouses: Bill Baxley (m. 1974; div. 1987) Jim Smith (m. 1996)
- Children: 2
- Education: Auburn University, Montgomery

Lucy Mae Bruner Baxley Smith (December 21, 1937 – October 14, 2016) was an American politician who served from 2003 to 2007 as the 28th lieutenant governor of Alabama and from 2008 to 2012 as president of the Alabama Public Service Commission. She was the first woman to hold the state's office of lieutenant governor. In 2006, she was the unsuccessful Democratic nominee for governor. In 2008, Baxley was elected President of the Alabama Public Service Commission, and was the only Democrat to win statewide that year. Until Doug Jones's swearing in after winning a 2017 U.S. Senate special election, Baxley had been the last Democrat to hold statewide office in Alabama. Baxley is the last statewide Democratic candidate to win over 50% of the vote.

== Early life ==
Baxley was born Lucy Mae Bruner in 1937 near rural Pansey, located near the larger city of Dothan in Houston County in southeastern Alabama. Baxley attended Auburn University at Montgomery but did not graduate.

== Political career ==
In 1994, Baxley was elected Alabama State Treasurer, in which capacity she pursued office modernization, including the first personal computers for staffers. She worked for expansion of the Prepaid Affordable College Tuition Program. In 1998, Baxley was re-elected to that post. In 2002, Baxley defeated Bill Armistead in the election as elected lieutenant governor, having received more votes than either candidate for governor that year. She also served as a delegate to the 1996 Democratic National Convention, which met in Chicago to renominate the Clinton-Gore ticket, which lost in Alabama.

In 2005, Baxley announced plans to run for governor in 2006. Her main opponent in the primary was former Governor Don Siegelman. In large part because of Siegelman's indictment for bribery and racketeering, she was able to secure important endorsements from the Alabama Democratic Conference, the New South Coalition, and the Alabama State Employees Association. Despite running a relatively low-profile campaign, she coasted to a win in the primary election on June 6 with 60 percent of the vote. Baxley was an underdog in the general election, however, against incumbent Republican Bob Riley, trailing by as much as 30 points in some polls. Baxley proposed a raise in the minimum wage of $1 per hour, which generated some criticism from her opponents. She was heavily outspent in the campaign by Riley and pointed to Riley's receipt of large contributions from recipients of industrial development subsidies. Baxley lost to Riley, 58-42 percent.

Baxley's term as lieutenant governor ended in 2007, and she was succeeded by fellow Democrat and former Governor Jim Folsom, Jr., of Cullman. Making a political comeback in 2008, Baxley defeated Republican Twinkle A. Cavanaugh to become president of the Alabama Public Service Commission. She replaced the retiring Jim Sullivan. She was then defeated by Cavanaugh in 2012 during her bid for reelection.

In each of her campaigns for office, Baxley utilized media bearing the title of the iconic CBS situation comedy starring Lucille Ball, I Love Lucy.

== Stroke and recovery ==
Baxley was admitted to UAB hospital in Birmingham on November 23, 2006, Thanksgiving Day. She had become ill Wednesday evening, while visiting her family in Birmingham. Doctors kept her for tests and observations. A spokeswoman for UAB announced that Baxley had suffered a mild stroke, but was expected to fully recover. A statement was issued via her family that asked Alabamians to keep Baxley in their prayers. No further details of her condition were given at the time.

She was discharged from UAB on November 29 and then moved to Lakeshore Rehabilitation Center in Birmingham. She remained there until being released December 29. The cause of Baxley's stroke has not been determined. Following the advice of her neurologist, Baxley did not return to Montgomery to preside over the opening of the Senate, her last official duty as lieutenant governor. According to Senator Lowell Barron, a Democrat from Fyffe, "Lucy's situation is serious." It was difficult for her to move her left leg and "she was unable to move her left arm." Following her discharge, she underwent outpatient rehabilitation.

== Personal life and death ==
Baxley first married at the age of eighteen; later, she married Bill Baxley, who from 1971 to 1979 was the state attorney general and later from 1983 to 1987 the lieutenant governor. Bill Baxley became involved with another woman in a widely publicized affair, and the couple divorced in 1987. From 1996 until her death in 2016, Baxley was married to Jim Smith.

A licensed real estate broker, Baxley opened a real estate practice in suburban Birmingham after leaving the office of lieutenant governor in 2007. She died at her home in Birmingham, Alabama on October 14, 2016 at age 78.

== Electoral history ==
2012 General Election: Alabama Public Service Commission

Candidate	Votes Received	Percentage
**Twinkle Cavanaugh** (R)	1,078,108	54.17%
*Lucy Baxley (D)	909,323	45.69%
Write-in	2,890	0.15%

2008 General Election: Alabama Public Service Commission

Candidate	Votes Received	Percentage
**Lucy Baxley** (D)	1,014,091	50.25%
Twinkle Cavanaugh (R)	1,001,643	49.64%
Write-in	2,199	0.11%

2006 General Election: Governor

Candidate	Votes Received	Percentage
***Bob Riley** (R)	718,327	57.45%
Lucy Baxley (D)	519,827	41.57%
Write-in	12,247	0.98%

2006 Democratic Primary: Governor

Candidate	Votes Received	Percentage
**Lucy Baxley**	279,165	59.84%
Don Siegelman	170,016	36.44%
Joe Copeland	4,141	0.89%
Nathan Mathis	4,000	0.86%
Katherine Mack	3,392	0.73%
James Potts	3,333	0.71%
Harry Lyon	2,490	0.53%

2002 General Election: Lieutenant Governor

Candidate	Votes Received	Percentage
**Lucy Baxley** (D)	694,442	51.48%
Bill Armistead (R)	630,839	46.76%
Lyn Curtis Adams (L)	21,884	1.62%
Write-in	1,873	0.14%

1998 General Election: State Treasurer

Candidate	Votes Received	Percentage
***Lucy Baxley** (D)	810,746	64.59%
Tom Davis (R)	443,901	35.37%
Write-in	496	0.04%

1994 General Election: State Treasurer

Candidate	Votes Received	Percentage
**Lucy Baxley** (D)	562,733	50.03%
James Martin (R)	561,701	49.93%
Write-in	444	0.03%

1994 Democratic Primary: State Treasurer

Candidate	Votes Received	Percentage
**Lucy Baxley**	313,154	55.20%
Elizabeth Alexander	157,184	27.71%
Steven R. Phelps, Sr.	96,958	17.09%

* = Incumbent

Bold = Winner

Note: All votes are official results from the Alabama Secretary of State website.

== See also ==
- List of female lieutenant governors in the United States

Political offices
Preceded by George Wallace Jr.	Treasurer of Alabama; 1995–2003	Succeeded by Kay Ivey
Preceded by Steve Windom	Lieutenant Governor of Alabama; 2003–2007	Succeeded by Jim Folsom
Preceded by Jim Sullivan	Chair of the Alabama Public Service Commission; 2009–2012	Succeeded by Twinkle Cavanaugh
Party political offices
Preceded by George Wallace Jr.	Democratic nominee for Alabama State Treasurer; 1994, 1998	Succeeded by Stephen Black
Preceded by Dewayne Freeman	Democratic nominee for Lieutenant Governor of Alabama; 2002	Succeeded by Jim Folsom
Preceded by Don Siegelman	Democratic nominee for Governor of Alabama; 2006	Succeeded by Ron Sparks
