= Hank Erwin =

American politician

Member of the Alabama Senate from the 14th district
- In office 2002–2010

Personal details
- Born: Henry Eugene Erwin Jr. April 2, 1949 (age 77) Birmingham, Alabama, U.S.
- Party: Republican
- Spouse: Shelia Joyce Erwin
- Profession: Talk show host

Henry Eugene "Hank" Erwin Jr. (born April 2, 1949) is an American evangelical Christian. Erwin was a broadcaster and a former Republican State Senator from Alabama, representing the 14th District, from 2002 until 2010. He represented portions of Jefferson, Shelby, Bibb and Chilton counties.

== Biography ==
Erwin was the son of Henry Eugene "Red" Erwin Sr., a U.S. Army Air Forces sergeant who earned the Medal of Honor in World War II. He was born in Birmingham, Alabama, and graduated from Ensley High School in 1967, before going on to earn degrees at Troy State University (1972), Southeastern Bible College (1974), and the Dallas Seminary (1981).

Erwin broke into broadcasting in the 1970s and served radio and TV stations in Dallas, Texas, and Birmingham, Alabama, for almost 35 years. He was elected to the Alabama Senate in 2002 and re-elected in 2006.

Erwin and his wife, Shelia, have two sons, filmmakers Andrew and Jon Erwin.

He received national media coverage in 2005 when he claimed that Hurricane Katrina was "the judgment of God" for "gambling, sin and wickedness" in New Orleans and along the Gulf Coast.

== 2010 Lt. Governor campaign ==
In April 2009, Erwin announced his plans to seek the position of Alabama Lieutenant Governor against then-incumbent Jim Folsom Jr.

Kay Ivey announced a switch from the governor's race to the lieutenant governor's race on March 31, 2010. Ivey defeated both Erwin and Daphne schoolteacher Gene Ponder by a significant margin in the June 1, 2010 primary. Ivey went on to be elected as lieutenant governor and was sworn in as governor in 2017 after Governor Robert J. Bentley's resignation.
