= Bob Riley =

Governor of Alabama from 2003 to 2011

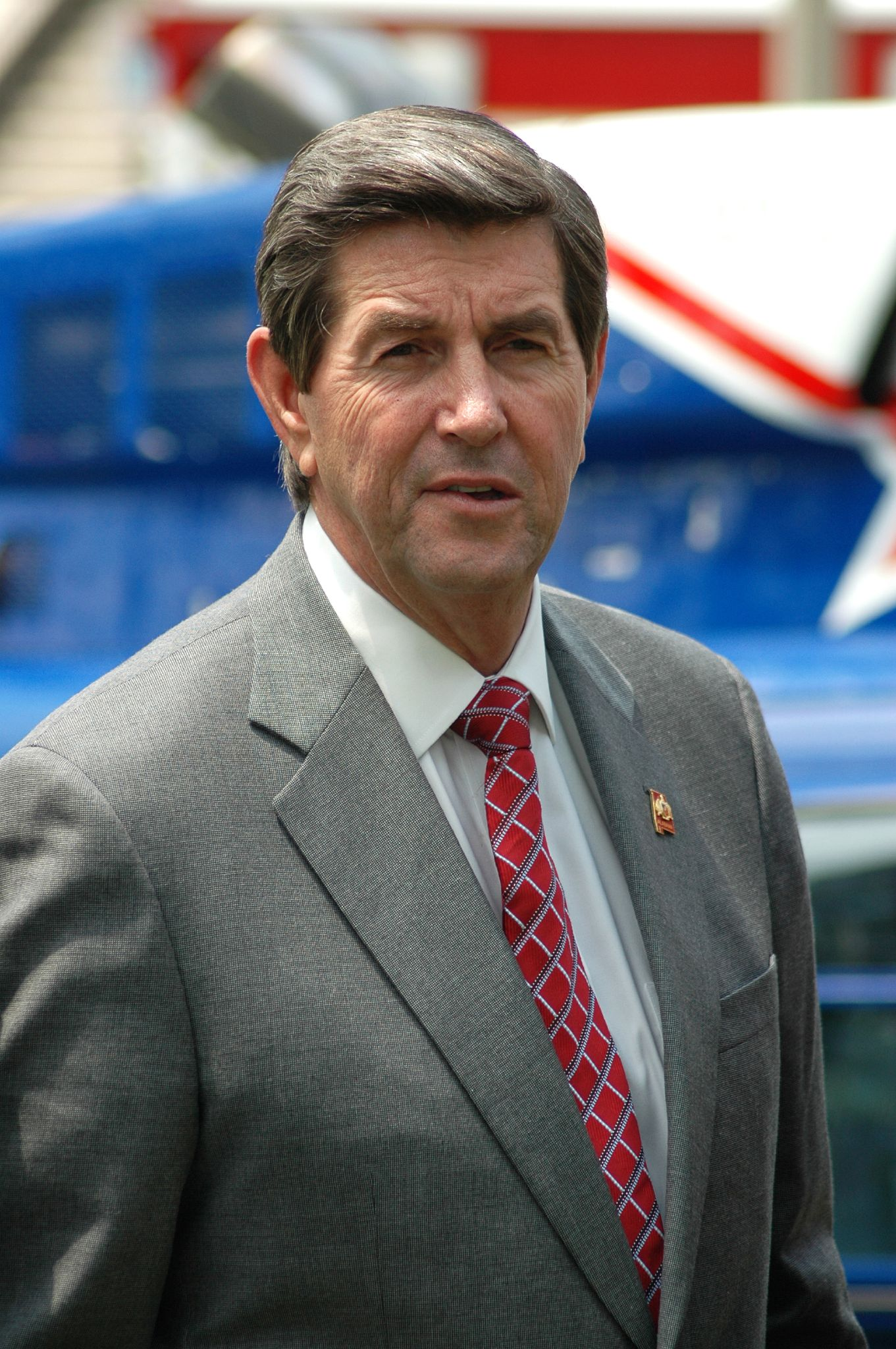
- Riley in 2005

52nd Governor of Alabama
- In office January 20, 2003 – January 17, 2011
- Lieutenant: Lucy Baxley; Jim Folsom Jr.
- Preceded by: Don Siegelman
- Succeeded by: Robert J. Bentley

Member of the U.S. House of Representatives from Alabama's 3rd district
- In office January 3, 1997 – January 3, 2003
- Preceded by: Glen Browder
- Succeeded by: Mike Rogers

Personal details
- Born: Robert Renfroe Riley; October 3, 1944 (age 81) Ashland, Alabama, U.S.
- Party: Republican
- Spouse: Patsy Adams (m. 1964)
- Children: 4
- Education: University of Alabama (BA)

Robert Renfroe Riley (born October 3, 1944) is an American retired politician and businessman who served as the 52nd governor of Alabama from 2003 to 2011. A member of the Republican Party, he was the U.S. representative for Alabama's 3rd congressional district from 1997 to 2003.

== Early life, education ==
Riley was born in Ashland, Alabama, a small town in Clay County where his family ranched and farmed for six generations. Riley attended the University of Alabama, where he was a brother of Phi Kappa Sigma fraternity and graduated with a degree in business administration.

== Early career ==
Prior to being elected to the U.S. House in 1996, Riley had led a number of businesses. He owned a car dealership and trucking company, and had also been a cattleman and commercial and residential realtor.

== U.S. House of Representatives ==
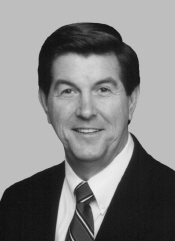
Rep Bob Riley house portrait

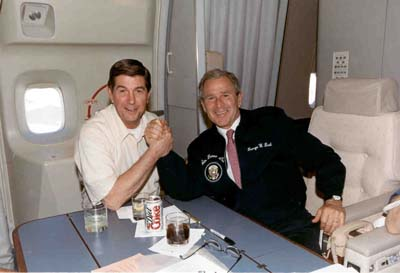
Riley with President George W. Bush

Riley was first elected to the U.S. House of Representatives in 1996, defeating his Democratic opponent, State Senator T.D. "Ted" Little (Auburn) and Libertarian John Sophocleus. It was his first run for elected office. He won by just over 6,000 votes to become only the second Republican to represent Alabama's 3rd district since Reconstruction. The first was Glenn Andrews, who held it from 1965 to 1967, when it was numbered as the 4th District.

Riley was reelected in 1998 with somewhat less difficulty, taking 58% of the vote over Democrat Joe Turnham. In 2000, he only faced a Libertarian candidate.

== Governor of Alabama ==
=== 2002 election ===
Riley did not run for re-election to the House in November 2002 (as a supporter of term limits, he imposed a three-term limit on himself), instead running for governor of Alabama and defeating the Democratic incumbent Don Siegelman by approximately 3,000 votes - the narrowest margin in the state's history for a gubernatorial race. The result was controversial, as the initial election night count showed a 2,000-plus vote victory for Siegelman.

Alabama gubernatorial election, 2002
Party	Candidate	Votes	%	±%
Republican	Bob Riley	672,225	49.2	+8.1
Democratic	Don Siegelman (incumbent)	669,105	48.9	−8.1
Libertarian	John Sophocleus	23,272	1.7	−−

=== First term ===
==== Approval ratings ====
On May 10, 2005, Riley's approval ratings were 36% approving and 52% disapproving of his job as governor. By September 20, 2005, Riley's approval ratings had increased substantially to 58% approving and 38% disapproving. Analysis of this increase seems to indicate that it may be attributed to the public's perception of Riley's response to Hurricane Katrina. By February 14, 2006, Riley's approval ratings had slightly decreased, with 52% approving and 43% disapproving of his job as governor. By August 2006, his approval rating was at 62% with a disapproval rating of 35%.

==== Supreme Court ====
In 2003, Alabama state politics gained national attention when the chief justice of the Alabama Supreme Court, Roy Moore, refused to remove a monument of the Ten Commandments from the rotunda of the court building. Riley reportedly supported Moore, but ultimately did not play a large role in the dispute. Riley stated there was nothing he could do to prevent Moore from being removed from office by a judicial ethics panel. Moore challenged Riley in the June 6, 2006, GOP primary.

==== Property taxes ====
Property tax appraisals became a major campaign issue with Riley's opponents claiming that Riley, acting through his revenue commissioner, ordered that property tax appraisals be made annually, rather than the quadrennial reappraisals that were established practice. Because property values tend to increase over time, making appraisals more frequent has the indirect effect of increasing the taxes paid by property owners. Riley's opponents claimed that by doing so, he raised taxes without a vote of either the Legislature or the people. Riley claims he is merely following the language of the law, and the advice of his attorneys.

==== Amendment One ====
In the first year of his administration, Riley proposed "Amendment One", which would have made swift changes to the state's tax system. The plan essentially consisted of income tax breaks for lower brackets, offset by various tax hikes on consumption, property and income from higher brackets. Part of the problem that this plan sought to address was the strong dependence the Alabama tax system placed upon sales tax, which makes the state budget dependent upon the economy in the state. The plan was estimated to yield an overall state revenue increase of $1.2 billion per year. The plan also included accountability reforms, including changes to teacher tenure policies, accountability for school systems, and bans on pass-through pork. This plan also included provisions for a scholarship program for Alabama students to attend college and funding of other education initiatives.

Both support and opposition to this plan came from traditionally opposing forces in Alabama, crossing party lines. This included support from pro-business organizations, including the Business Council of Alabama and many Chambers of Commerce, as well as prominent education organizations, including the Alabama Education Association. Other progressively-minded non-profit groups supported this plan, including many organizations that had sought changes in the Alabama tax system for many years. These organizations saw this as an opportunity for Alabama to invest in the future of the state through investments in education and governmental reforms. Riley also presented this plan using Christian terms, building upon language already present in the state to argue that the Alabama tax system placed the heaviest burden upon the poorest citizens of the state. Opponents to the plan included the Alabama chapter of the Christian Coalition (splitting with the national Christian Coalition who endorsed the plan), and the Alabama Farmers Federation (ALFA). A number of those who opposed this plan, including both organizations mentioned, had strongly supported Riley for governor in 2002. These opponents based a campaign upon a criticism of the state legislature and used the complexity of the plans to claim that taxes would go up on people in the state. While proponents had pointed to studies of the plan showing the majority of Alabamians seeing a lower overall tax burden, polls indicated that most citizens - likely influenced by the proposed property tax increase - believed their personal taxes would be higher under the plan.

Amendment One was rejected by voters on September 9, 2003, with 68% opposed. While Riley's Amendment One was soundly rejected by Alabama voters, it did gain him national recognition. For his leadership in addressing the state's fiscal crisis, Governor Riley was named the "Public Official of the Year" by Governing magazine in 2003, and Time magazine hailed him for being one of the nation's "most courageous politicians".

The overwhelming rejection of this plan forced Riley to mend fences within his own base and seek to do some reforms without the broad tax increases that Amendment One sought. Some parts of the proposal have been enacted, such as efforts to raise the minimum tax threshold in Alabama.

==== Industrial development ====
Riley has claimed credit for helping to spur economic development in Alabama. Riley points to the opening of an aeronautics engineering facility in Mobile by EADS, the parent company of Airbus, which may ripen into an aircraft assembly plant if EADS secures future contracts. Riley's critics have pointed out that Riley has failed to emulate the success of predecessors, such as Siegelman – during whose administration the Hyundai plant was successfully recruited – and Jim Folsom, Jr., in securing automotive manufacturing plants. Specifically, when Kia announced in March 2006 it would build a maunfucturing plant in Georgia, Riley was criticized by Siegelman, for Alabama's failure to mount a serious bid for the plant.

Under Riley's administration, unemployment in Alabama fell from 5.3% in January 2003 when Riley took office to 3.3% in March 2006. This rate was the lowest ever recorded since statistics began being tracked in 1976 and was among the nations lowest.

==== Hurricanes ====
In 2005, Governor Riley was criticized by some Mobile County residents after issuing that area of the state a "mandatory" evacuation order in advance of Hurricane Dennis' landfall. Residents felt the issue was better addressed during Hurricane Katrina using a layered approach with sections of the county evacuated instead of the entire county.

On August 28, 2005, Governor Riley declared a state of emergency for the approaching Hurricane Katrina. On the same day, he requested president George W. Bush to declare "expedited major disaster declaration" for six counties of south Alabama, which was approved by the evening of August 29. 350 national guardsmen were called on duty as of August 30.

Aruba local government

On November 9, 2005, Riley called for a citizens' boycott of Aruba, alleging that the local government was engaged in a cover-up of the disappearance of Alabama native Natalee Holloway.

==== Abramoff scandal ====
In November 2005, Riley was linked to the Jack Abramoff scandal when his former Congressional press secretary, Michael Scanlon, pleaded guilty to conspiracy in the matter. It further emerged that, as a Congressman, Riley signed a letter on behalf of the U.S. Family Network, opposing expansion of casino gambling in Alabama. The U.S. Family Network was revealed to be an Abramoff front, funded by the Mississippi Band of Choctaw Indians, which operated competing casinos. Riley has denied knowing the source of this funding.

=== 2006 election ===
Riley defeated Democratic Lieutenant Governor Lucy Baxley easily as his approval ratings made a comeback.

Alabama gubernatorial election, 2006
Party	Candidate	Votes	%	±%
Republican	Bob Riley (Incumbent)	717,287	58.03	+8.83
Democratic	Lucy Baxley	518,750	41.97	−6.93

=== Second term ===
==== Economy ====
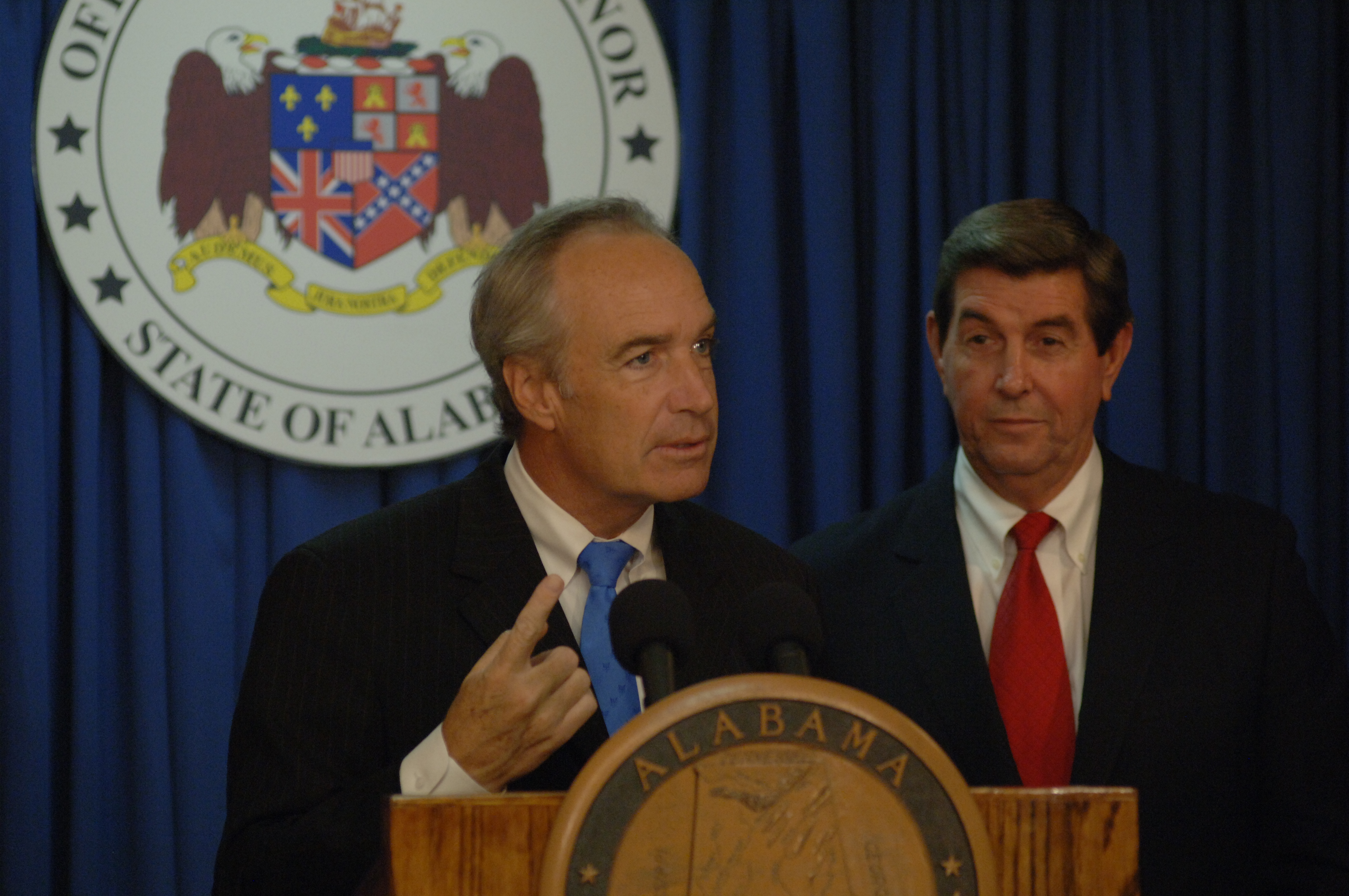
Governor Bob Riley with Secretary of the Interior Dirk Kempthorne addressing inter-state water issues in October 2007.

In April 2007, the unemployment rate once again reached 3.3%. However, recent labor statistics provided by the Alabama Department of Industrial Relations indicate that under Governor Riley, Alabama's unemployment nearly tripled to a seasonally adjusted rate of 8.4% in February 2009. The rates for seasonally adjusted and unadjusted range from 7.8–8.9% for January and February 2009.

Under Governor Riley, Alabama's unemployment has continued to climb, and Alabama Department of Industrial Relations Director Tom Surtees issued a press release dated June 19, 2009, which indicated that Alabama's unemployment rate for May rose to 9.8%, an increase from April's rate of 9.0%, and is Alabama's highest unemployment rate in 25 years.

Critics have claimed that recent developments are a consequence of national economic recovery and pointed to the loss of thousands of Alabama's historic textile jobs under Riley. Nevertheless, the state under Riley's administration was recognized as "State of the Year" by Southern Business and Development magazine four years in a row and received other awards for competitiveness, job creation and economic development.

Among other honors, Worldwide Interactive Network named the Alabama Office of Workforce Development the No. 1 U.S. employee development agency and Expansion Management magazine has ranked Alabama Industrial Development Training No. 1 among workforce training programs. Riley's Alabama Bureau of Tourism & Travel received the National Council of State Tourism Directors' annual Mercury Award recognizing its "Year of Alabama Food" as the nation's top tourism campaign.

In May 2007, Riley announced that ThyssenKrupp would build a $4.2 billion state-of-the-art steel mill north of Mobile, Alabama, the largest economic announcement in Alabama's history, and largest corporate project in U.S. history. The mill, now in operation, employs 2,700 workers

==== Transparency ====
As part of his plan to provide open government, Riley has posted on the Governor's website the monthly expenditures from the Governor's Contingency Fund and the quarterly flight logs from all state airplanes.

==== Death penalty ====
As governor, Riley oversaw 25 executions in Alabama, more than any of his predecessors since 1983 (see Capital punishment in Alabama).

==== Apology for slavery ====
In 2007, Riley signed a resolution passed by the legislature apologizing for slavery in the state.

== 2012 presidential speculation ==
An editorial by The Washington Times and separate piece in the paper on August 13, 2009, in what was deemed to be an open endorsement of Bob Riley as a potential 2012 presidential candidate instantly threw the governor's name into the political field of possible nominees as state and national media jumped on the story. Governor Riley during an interview the same day denied he was considering a future presidential run. On February 2, 2011, both the Birmingham News and the Decatur Daily also ran stories speculating that Riley was considering running for president. In the end, Riley did not run.

== Personal life ==
Riley is married to Patsy Adams, also from Clay County. The Rileys have four children, Rob, Jenice, Minda and Krisalyn. Jenice, the Rileys' eldest daughter and the campaign's fundraiser, died in August 2001. The Rileys have three granddaughters and three grandsons. He is an alumni brother of Phi Kappa Sigma.

On June 26, 2011, Riley was on a cross-country trip on his Harley-Davidson motorcycle when he crashed on the Dalton Highway in Fairbanks, Alaska and sustained serious injuries.

== Electoral history ==
Alabama's 3rd congressional district election, 1996
Party	Candidate	Votes	%
Republican	Bob Riley	98,353	50.4
Democratic	Ted Little	92,325	47.3
Natural Law	Lucy Lawrence	2,335	1.2
Libertarian	Ralph Stokes	1,983	1.0
Write-in		51	0.0
Total votes		195,047	100.0
Republican gain from Democratic			

Alabama's 3rd congressional district election, 1998
Party	Candidate	Votes	%
Republican	Bob Riley (incumbent)	101,731	58.1
Democratic	Joe Turnham	73,357	41.9
Write-in		129	0.1
Total votes		175,217	100.0
Republican hold			

Alabama's 3rd congressional district election, 2000
Party	Candidate	Votes	%
Republican	Bob Riley (incumbent)	147,317	86.9
Libertarian	John Sophocleus	21,119	12.5
Write-in		1,083	0.6
Total votes		169,519	100.0
Republican hold			

Alabama Republican gubernatorial primary, 2002
Party	Candidate	Votes	%
Republican	Bob Riley	262,851	73.5
Republican	Steve Windom	63,775	17.8
Republican	Tim James	30,871	8.6
Total votes		357,497	100.0

Alabama gubernatorial election, 2002
Party	Candidate	Votes	%
Republican	Bob Riley	672,225	49.2
Democratic	Don Siegelman (incumbent)	669,105	49.0
Libertarian	John Sophocleus	23,272	1.7
Write-in		2,451	0.2
Total votes		1,367,053	100.0
Republican gain from Democratic			

Alabama Republican gubernatorial primary, 2006
Party	Candidate	Votes	%
Republican	Bob Riley (incumbent)	306,665	66.7
Republican	Roy Moore	153,354	33.3
Total votes		460,019	100.0

Alabama gubernatorial election, 2006
Party	Candidate	Votes	%
Republican	Bob Riley (incumbent)	718,327	57.5
Democratic	Lucy Baxley	519,827	41.6
Write-in		12,247	1.0
Total votes		1,250,401	100.0
Republican hold			

== See also ==
U.S. House of Representatives
Preceded by Glen Browder	Member of the U.S. House of Representatives from Alabama's 3rd congressional district 1997–2003	Succeeded by Mike Rogers
Party political offices
Preceded by Fob James	Republican nominee for Governor of Alabama; 2002, 2006	Succeeded by Robert Bentley
Political offices
Preceded by Don Siegelman	Governor of Alabama; 2003–2011	Succeeded by Robert Bentley
U.S. order of precedence (ceremonial)
Preceded by Don Siegelman as Former Governor	Order of precedence of the United States	Succeeded by Robert Bentley as Former Governor
