= Political party strength in Alabama =

Politics in the US state of Alabama

The following table displays, by color, the parties of elected officials in the U.S. state of Alabama from 1817 to the current year. As such, it may indicate the political party strength at any given time. The officers listed include:

- Governor
- Lieutenant governor
- Secretary of State
- Attorney general
- Comptroller of Public Accounts/State Auditor (Note: With the adoption of the state Constitution of 1819, the auditor became the comptroller of public accounts elected annually by a joint vote of both houses of the General Assembly. The Constitution of 1868 changed the title of the office to auditor and established a process by which the officeholder would be chosen by the electors of the state every four years.)
- State treasurer
- Commissioner of Agriculture and Industries

The table also indicates the historical party composition in the:

- State Senate
- State House of Representatives
- State delegation to the U.S. Senate
- State delegation to the U.S. House of Representatives

For years in which a presidential election was held, the table indicates which party's nominees received the state's electoral votes.

== 1817–1882 ==
Year	Executive offices						General Assembly		United States Congress			Electoral votes
Year	Governor	Lt. Governor	Secretary of State	Attorney General	Auditor	Treasurer	State Senate	State House	U.S. Senate (Class II)	U.S. Senate (Class III)	U.S. House	Electoral votes
1817	William W. Bibb (NP) (Note: Governor of Alabama Territory appointed by President James Monroe.)	no such office	no such office	no such office		Jack Ross (Note: Treasurer of Alabama Territory.)	no such bodies		no such offices		John; Crowell (DR) (Note: Delegate from Alabama Territory.)	no electoral votes
1818	William W. Bibb (NP)	no such office	Henry Hitchcock (DR) (Note: Secretary of Alabama Territory.)	no such office		Jack Ross	[?]	D majority	no such offices		John; Crowell (DR)	no electoral votes
1819	William W. Bibb (DR) (Note: Died in office.)	no such office	Thomas A. Rodgers	Henry Hitchcock (DR)	Samuel Pickens	Jack Ross	[?]	W majority	William R. King (DR)	John Williams Walker (DR)	John; Crowell (DR)	no electoral votes
1820	William W. Bibb (DR)	no such office	Thomas A. Rodgers	Henry Hitchcock (DR)	Samuel Pickens	Jack Ross	[?]	D majority	William R. King (DR)	John Williams Walker (DR)	John; Crowell (DR)	Monroe/ Tompkins (DR) ✓
1820	Thomas Bibb (DR) (Note: As president of the state senate, filled unexpired term.)	no such office	Thomas A. Rodgers	Henry Hitchcock (DR)	Samuel Pickens	Jack Ross	[?]	D majority	William R. King (DR)	John Williams Walker (DR)	John; Crowell (DR)	Monroe/ Tompkins (DR) ✓
1821	Thomas Bibb (DR)	no such office	James J. Pleasants (W)	Henry Hitchcock (DR)	Samuel Pickens	Jack Ross	[?]	W majority	William R. King (DR)	John Williams Walker (DR)	Gabriel; Moore (DR)	Monroe/ Tompkins (DR) ✓
1822	Israel Pickens (DR)	no such office	James J. Pleasants (W)	Henry Hitchcock (DR)	Samuel Pickens	John C. Perry	[?]	W majority	William R. King (DR)	William Kelly (DR)	Gabriel; Moore (DR)	Monroe/ Tompkins (DR) ✓
1823	Israel Pickens (DR)	no such office	James J. Pleasants (W)	Thomas White	Samuel Pickens	John C. Perry	[?]	D majority	William R. King (DR)	William Kelly (DR)	3DR	Monroe/ Tompkins (DR) ✓
1824	Israel Pickens (DR)	no such office	James Innes Thornton (Note: Resigned.)	Thomas White	Samuel Pickens	John C. Perry	[?]	D majority	William R. King (DR)	William Kelly (DR)	3DR	Jackson/ Calhoun (DR) ✗
1825	Israel Pickens (DR)	no such office	James Innes Thornton	Constantine Perkins	Samuel Pickens	John C. Perry	[?]	D majority	William R. King (J)	Henry H. Chambers (J)	3J	Jackson/ Calhoun (DR) ✗
1826	John Murphy (J)	no such office	James Innes Thornton	Constantine Perkins	Samuel Pickens	John C. Perry	[?]	D majority	William R. King (J)	Israel Pickens (J)	3J	Jackson/ Calhoun (DR) ✗
1827	John Murphy (J)	no such office	James Innes Thornton	Constantine Perkins	Samuel Pickens	John C. Perry	[?]	D majority	William R. King (J)	John McKinley (J)	3J	Jackson/ Calhoun (DR) ✗
1828	John Murphy (J)	no such office	James Innes Thornton	Constantine Perkins	Samuel Pickens	John C. Perry	[?]	D majority	William R. King (J)	John McKinley (J)	3J	Jackson/ Calhoun (D) ✓
1829	John Murphy (J)	no such office	James Innes Thornton	Constantine Perkins	George W. Crabb (W)	Hardin Perkins	[?]	D majority	William R. King (J)	John McKinley (J)	3J	Jackson/ Calhoun (D) ✓
1830	Gabriel Moore (J) (Note: Resigned to take an elected seat in the United States Senate.)	no such office	James Innes Thornton	Constantine Perkins	George W. Crabb (W)	Hardin Perkins	[?]	D majority	William R. King (J)	John McKinley (J)	3J	Jackson/ Calhoun (D) ✓
1831	Samuel B. Moore (D)	no such office	James Innes Thornton	Constantine Perkins	George W. Crabb (W)	Hardin Perkins	[?]	D majority	William R. King (J)	Gabriel Moore (J)	3J	Jackson/ Calhoun (D) ✓
1832	John Gayle (D)	no such office	James Innes Thornton	Peter Martin (Note: Resigned following appointment to the Circuit Court bench.)	George W. Crabb (W)	Hardin Perkins	[?]	D majority	William R. King (J)	Gabriel Moore (J)	3J	Jackson/ Van Buren (D) ✓
1833	John Gayle (D)	no such office	James Innes Thornton	Peter Martin	George W. Crabb (W)	Hardin Perkins	[?]	D majority	William R. King (J)	Gabriel Moore (NR)	4J, 1N	Jackson/ Van Buren (D) ✓
1834	John Gayle (D)	no such office	Edmund A. Webster	Peter Martin	George W. Crabb (W)	William Hawn	[?]	D majority	William R. King (J)	Gabriel Moore (NR)	4J, 1N	Jackson/ Van Buren (D) ✓
1835	John Gayle (D)	no such office	Edmund A. Webster	Peter Martin	George W. Crabb (W)	William Hawn	[?]	D majority	William R. King (J)	Gabriel Moore (NR)	3J, 1N, 1NR	Jackson/ Van Buren (D) ✓
1836	Clement Comer Clay (D)	no such office	Thomas B. Tunstall	Alexander Meek (D) (Note: Appointed to fill a vacancy.)	Jefferson C. Van Dyke	William Hawn	[?]	D majority	William R. King (J)	Gabriel Moore (NR)	3J, 1N, 1NR	Van Buren/ Johnson (D) ✓
1837	Clement Comer Clay (D)	no such office	Thomas B. Tunstall	John Dennis Phelan (D)	Jefferson C. Van Dyke	William Hawn	18W, 12D, 3?	46W, 44D, 10?	William R. King (D)	John McKinley (D)	3D, 2W	Van Buren/ Johnson (D) ✓
1837	Hugh McVay (D)	no such office	Thomas B. Tunstall	John Dennis Phelan (D)	Jefferson C. Van Dyke	William Hawn	18W, 12D, 3?	46W, 44D, 10?	William R. King (D)	Clement Comer Clay (D)	3D, 2W	Van Buren/ Johnson (D) ✓
1838	Arthur P. Bagby (D)	no such office	Thomas B. Tunstall	Lincoln Clarke	Jefferson C. Van Dyke	William Hawn	[?]	45D, 33W, 22?	William R. King (D)	Clement Comer Clay (D)	3D, 2W	Van Buren/ Johnson (D) ✓
1839	Arthur P. Bagby (D)	no such office	Thomas B. Tunstall	Matthew W. Lindsay (W)	Jefferson C. Van Dyke	William Hawn	19D, 9W, 5?	66D, 31W, 3?	William R. King (D)	Clement Comer Clay (D)	3D, 2W	Van Buren/ Johnson (D) ✓
1840	Arthur P. Bagby (D)	no such office	William Garrett (D)	Matthew W. Lindsay (W)	Jefferson C. Van Dyke	Samuel Frierson	23D, 10W	67D, 33W	William R. King (D)	Clement Comer Clay (D)	3D, 2W	Van Buren/ Johnson (D) ✗
1841	Arthur P. Bagby (D)	no such office	William Garrett (D)	Matthew W. Lindsay (W)	Jefferson C. Van Dyke	Samuel Frierson	20D, 13W	54D, 46W	William R. King (D)	Clement Comer Clay (D)	5D	Van Buren/ Johnson (D) ✗
1842	Benjamin Fitzpatrick (D)	no such office	William Garrett (D)	Matthew W. Lindsay (W)	Jefferson C. Van Dyke	Samuel Frierson	20D, 13W	52D, 48W	William R. King (D)	Arthur P. Bagby (D)	5D	Van Buren/ Johnson (D) ✗
1843	Benjamin Fitzpatrick (D)	no such office	William Garrett (D)	Thomas D. Clarke	Jefferson C. Van Dyke	Samuel Frierson	21D, 12W	67D, 33W	William R. King (D)	Arthur P. Bagby (D)	6D, 1W	Van Buren/ Johnson (D) ✗
1844	Benjamin Fitzpatrick (D)	no such office	William Garrett (D)	Thomas D. Clarke	Jefferson C. Van Dyke	Samuel Frierson	19D, 14W	62D, 38W	Dixon H. Lewis (D)	Arthur P. Bagby (D)	6D, 1W	Polk/ Dallas (D) ✓
1845	Benjamin Fitzpatrick (D)	no such office	William Garrett (D)	Thomas D. Clarke	Jefferson C. Van Dyke	Samuel Frierson	D majority	D majority	Dixon H. Lewis (D)	Arthur P. Bagby (D)	6D, 1W	Polk/ Dallas (D) ✓
1846	Joshua L. Martin (ID) (Note: Democrat who opposed party leaders and ran as an independent.)	no such office	William Garrett (D)	Thomas D. Clarke	Jefferson C. Van Dyke	William Graham	20D, 13W	61D, 37W, 2?	Dixon H. Lewis (D)	Arthur P. Bagby (D)	6D, 1W	Polk/ Dallas (D) ✓
1847	Joshua L. Martin (ID)	no such office	William Garrett (D)	William H. Martin	Jefferson C. Van Dyke	William Graham	20D, 13W	61D, 37W, 2?	Dixon H. Lewis (D)	Arthur P. Bagby (D)	5D, 2W	Polk/ Dallas (D) ✓
1848	Reuben Chapman (D)	no such office	William Garrett (D)	Marion A. Baldwin	Joel Riggs	William Graham	17D, 16W	65D, 35W	Benjamin Fitzpatrick (D)	William R. King (D)	5D, 2W	Cass/ Butler (D) ✗
1849	Reuben Chapman (D)	no such office	William Garrett (D)	Marion A. Baldwin	Joel Riggs	William Graham	17D, 16W	65D, 35W	Jeremiah Clemens (D)	William R. King (D)	5D, 2W	Cass/ Butler (D) ✗
1850	Henry W. Collier (D)	no such office	William Garrett (D)	Marion A. Baldwin	Joel Riggs	William Graham	17W, 16D	57D, 43W	Jeremiah Clemens (D)	William R. King (D)	5D, 2W	Cass/ Butler (D) ✗
1851	Henry W. Collier (D)	no such office	William Garrett (D)	Marion A. Baldwin	Joel Riggs	William Graham	17W, 16D	57D, 43W	Jeremiah Clemens (D)	William R. King (D)	4D, 2W, 1U	Cass/ Butler (D) ✗
1852	Henry W. Collier (D)	no such office	Vincent M. Benham (D)	Marion A. Baldwin	Joel Riggs	William Graham	22U, 11SR	62U, 38SR	Jeremiah Clemens (D)	William R. King (D)	4D, 2W, 1U	Pierce/ King (D) ✓
1853	Henry W. Collier (D)	no such office	Vincent M. Benham (D)	Marion A. Baldwin	Joel Riggs	William Graham	22U, 11SR	62U, 38SR	Clement Claiborne Clay (D)	Benjamin Fitzpatrick (D)	6D, 1W	Pierce/ King (D) ✓
1854	John A. Winston (D)	no such office	Vincent M. Benham (D)	Marion A. Baldwin	Joel Riggs	William Graham	20D, 13W	59D, 41W	Clement Claiborne Clay (D)	Benjamin Fitzpatrick (D)	6D, 1W	Pierce/ King (D) ✓
1855	John A. Winston (D)	no such office	Vincent M. Benham (D)	Marion A. Baldwin	William J. Greene	William Graham	20D, 13W	59D, 41W	Clement Claiborne Clay (D)	Benjamin Fitzpatrick (D)	5D, 2KN	Pierce/ King (D) ✓
1856	John A. Winston (D)	no such office	James H. Weaver	Marion A. Baldwin	William J. Greene	William Graham	20D, 13KN	61D, 39KN	Clement Claiborne Clay (D)	Benjamin Fitzpatrick (D)	5D, 2KN	Buchanan/ Breckinridge (D) ✓
1857	John A. Winston (D)	no such office	James H. Weaver	Marion A. Baldwin	William J. Greene	William Graham	20D, 13KN	61D, 39KN	Clement Claiborne Clay (D)	Benjamin Fitzpatrick (D)	7D	Buchanan/ Breckinridge (D) ✓
1858	Andrew B. Moore (D)	no such office	James H. Weaver	Marion A. Baldwin	William J. Greene	William Graham	27D, 6KN	84D, 16KN	Clement Claiborne Clay (D)	Benjamin Fitzpatrick (D)	7D	Buchanan/ Breckinridge (D) ✓
1859	Andrew B. Moore (D)	no such office	James H. Weaver	Marion A. Baldwin	William J. Greene	William Graham	27D, 6KN	84D, 16KN	Clement Claiborne Clay (D)	Benjamin Fitzpatrick (D)	7D	Buchanan/ Breckinridge (D) ✓
1860	Andrew B. Moore (D)	no such office	Patrick Henry Brittan (D)	Marion A. Baldwin	William J. Greene	Duncan Graham (D)	27D, 6O	85D, 15O	Clement Claiborne Clay (D)	Benjamin Fitzpatrick (D)	7D	Breckinridge/ Lane (SD) ✗
1861	Andrew B. Moore (D)	no such office	Patrick Henry Brittan (D)	Marion A. Baldwin	William J. Greene	Duncan Graham (D)	27D, 6O	85D, 15O	vacant		vacant	Breckinridge/ Lane (SD) ✗
1862	John Gill Shorter (D)	no such office	Patrick Henry Brittan (D)	Marion A. Baldwin	William J. Greene	Duncan Graham (D)	American Civil War		vacant		vacant	Breckinridge/ Lane (SD) ✗
1863	John Gill Shorter (D)	no such office	Patrick Henry Brittan (D)	Marion A. Baldwin	William J. Greene	Duncan Graham (D)	American Civil War		vacant		vacant	Breckinridge/ Lane (SD) ✗
1864	Thomas H. Watts (W) (Note: Arrested by Union forces soon after the American Civil War ended in May 1865; was released a few weeks later.)	no such office	Patrick Henry Brittan (D)	Marion A. Baldwin	William J. Greene	Duncan Graham (D)	American Civil War		vacant		vacant	no electoral votes
1865	Thomas H. Watts (W)	no such office	Albert Stanhope Elmore (Note: Initially appointed to fill vacancy, later elected in his own right.)	John W. A. Sanford Jr. (D)	Malcolm A. Chisholm	Lyd Saxon (D)	American Civil War		vacant		vacant	no electoral votes
1865	Lewis E. Parsons (R) (Note: Provisional governor appointed by the Union occupation; between Watts's arrest and Parsons' appointment, Alabama had no governor, instead being under direct rule of General George Henry Thomas.)	no such office	Albert Stanhope Elmore	John W. A. Sanford Jr. (D)	Malcolm A. Chisholm	Lyd Saxon (D)	American Civil War		vacant		vacant	no electoral votes
1866	Robert M. Patton (W) (Note: The United States Congress stripped Patton of most of his authority in March 1867, after which time the state was effectively under the control of Major General Wager Swayne.)	no such office	David L. Dalton (D)	John W. A. Sanford Jr. (D)	Malcolm A. Chisholm	Lyd Saxon (D)	33NP	100NP	vacant		vacant	no electoral votes
1867	Robert M. Patton (W)	no such office	Micah Taul (D)	John W. A. Sanford Jr. (D)	Malcolm A. Chisholm	Lyd Saxon (D)	33NP	100NP	vacant		6R	no electoral votes
1867	Wager Swayne (M) (Note: Military governor appointed during Reconstruction; though Patton was still officially governor, he was mostly a figurehead. The term start date given is the date of the first of the Reconstruction Acts, which placed Alabama into the Third Military District; all references only say "March 1867.")	no such office	Micah Taul (D)	John W. A. Sanford Jr. (D)	Malcolm A. Chisholm	Lyd Saxon (D)	33NP	100NP	vacant		6R	no electoral votes
1868	Wager Swayne (M)	no such office	Charles A. Miller (R)	Joshua Morse (R)	Malcolm A. Chisholm	Arthur Bingham (R)	33NP	100NP	vacant		6R	Grant/ Colfax (R) ✓
1868	William Hugh Smith (R) (Note: Robert Lindsay was sworn into office on November 26, 1870, but William H. Smith refused to leave his seat for two weeks, claiming Lindsay was fraudulently elected, finally leaving office on December 8, 1870, when a court so ordered.)	no such office	Charles A. Miller (R)	Joshua Morse (R)	Malcolm A. Chisholm	Arthur Bingham (R)	33NP	100NP	Willard Warner (R)	George E. Spencer (R)	6R	Grant/ Colfax (R) ✓
1868	William Hugh Smith (R)	Andrew J. Applegate (R)	Charles A. Miller (R)	Joshua Morse (R)	Malcolm A. Chisholm	Arthur Bingham (R)	33NP	100NP	Willard Warner (R)	George E. Spencer (R)	6R	Grant/ Colfax (R) ✓
1869	William Hugh Smith (R)	Andrew J. Applegate (R)	Charles A. Miller (R)	Joshua Morse (R)	Robert M. Reynolds (R)	Arthur Bingham (R)	32R, 1D	97R, 3D	Willard Warner (R)	George E. Spencer (R)	4R, 2D	Grant/ Colfax (R) ✓
1870	William Hugh Smith (R)	Andrew J. Applegate (R)	Jabez J. Parker (D)	John W. A. Sanford Jr. (D)	Robert M. Reynolds (R)	James Grant	32R, 1D	97R, 3D	Willard Warner (R)	George E. Spencer (R)	4R, 2D	Grant/ Colfax (R) ✓
1871	Robert B. Lindsay (D)	Edward H. Moren (D)	Jabez J. Parker (D)	John W. A. Sanford Jr. (D)	Robert M. Reynolds (R)	James Grant	32R, 1D	65D, 35R	George Goldthwaite (D)	George E. Spencer (R)	3R, 3D	Grant/ Colfax (R) ✓
1872	Robert B. Lindsay (D)	Edward H. Moren (D)	Patrick Ragland (R)	Benjamin Gardner (R)	Robert T. Smith (R)	Arthur Bingham (R)	32R, 1D	65D, 35R	George Goldthwaite (D)	George E. Spencer (R)	3R, 3D	Grant/ Wilson (R) ✓
1873	David P. Lewis (R)	Alexander McKinstry (R)	Neander H. Rice (R)	Benjamin Gardner (R)	Robert T. Smith (R)	Arthur Bingham (R)	17R, 16D (Note: Initial returns showed a 19-14 Democratic majority, but was overturned in a series of contests through March 1873.)	51R, 49D (Note: Initial returns showed a 54-46 Democratic majority, but was overturned in a series of contests through March 1873.)	George Goldthwaite (D)	George E. Spencer (R)	6R, 2D	Grant/ Wilson (R) ✓
1874	David P. Lewis (R)	Alexander McKinstry (R)	Rufus K. Boyd (D)	John W. A. Sanford (D)	Robert T. Smith (R)	Daniel Crawford	17R, 16D	51R, 49D	George Goldthwaite (D)	George E. Spencer (R)	6R, 2D	Grant/ Wilson (R) ✓
1875	George S. Houston (D)	Robert F. Ligon (D)	Rufus K. Boyd (D)	John W. A. Sanford (D)	Robert T. Smith (R)	Daniel Crawford	20D, 13R	60D, 40R	George Goldthwaite (D)	George E. Spencer (R)	6D, 2R	Grant/ Wilson (R) ✓
1876	George S. Houston (D)	Robert F. Ligon (D)	Rufus K. Boyd (D)	John W. A. Sanford (D)	Willis Brewer (D)	Daniel Crawford	20D, 13R	60D, 40R	George Goldthwaite (D)	George E. Spencer (R)	6D, 2R	Tilden/ Hendricks (D) ✗
1877	George S. Houston (D)	no such office (Note: Position of lieutenant governor was eliminated in 1875, effective at the end of the then-present term in November 1876, and was reestablished upon the adoption of the Alabama Constitution in 1901.)	Rufus K. Boyd (D)	John W. A. Sanford (D)	Willis Brewer (D)	Daniel Crawford	33D	80D, 20R	John T. Morgan (D)	George E. Spencer (R)	8D	Tilden/ Hendricks (D) ✗
1878	George S. Houston (D)	no such office	William W. Screws (D)	Henry Tompkins (D)	Willis Brewer (D)	Isaac Vincent (D)	33D	80D, 20R	John T. Morgan (D)	George E. Spencer (R)	8D	Tilden/ Hendricks (D) ✗
1879	Rufus W. Cobb (D)	no such office	William W. Screws (D)	Henry Tompkins (D)	Willis Brewer (D)	Isaac Vincent (D)	31D, 2R	91D, 4ID, 3R, 2GB	John T. Morgan (D)	George S. Houston (D)	7D, 1GB	Tilden/ Hendricks (D) ✗
1880	Rufus W. Cobb (D)	no such office	William W. Screws (D)	Henry Tompkins (D)	J. Malcolm Carmichael	Isaac Vincent (D)	31D, 2R	91D, 4ID, 3R, 2GB	John T. Morgan (D)	Luke Pryor (D)	7D, 1GB	Hancock/ English (D) ✗
1881	Rufus W. Cobb (D)	no such office	William W. Screws (D)	Henry Tompkins (D)	J. Malcolm Carmichael	Isaac Vincent (D)	33D	94D, 4ID, 1R, 1GB	John T. Morgan (D)	James L. Pugh (D)	8D	Hancock/ English (D) ✗
1882	Rufus W. Cobb (D)	no such office	Ellis Phelan (D)	Henry Tompkins (D)	J. Malcolm Carmichael	Isaac Vincent (D)	33D	94D, 4ID, 1R, 1GB	John T. Morgan (D)	James L. Pugh (D)	7D, 1GB	Hancock/ English (D) ✗

== 1883–present ==
Year	Executive offices							State Legislature		United States Congress			Electoral votes
Year	Governor	Lt. Governor	Secretary of State	Attorney General	Auditor	Treasurer	Ag. Comm.	State Senate	State House	U.S. Senate (Class II)	U.S. Senate (Class III)	U.S. House	Electoral votes
1883	Edward A. O'Neal (D)	no such office (Note: Position of lieutenant governor was eliminated in 1875, effective at the end of the then-present term in November 1876, and was reestablished upon the adoption of the Alabama Constitution in 1901.)	Ellis Phelan (D)	Henry Tompkins (D)	J. Malcolm Carmichael	Frederick Smith	Edward C. Betts (D)	31D, 2R	77D, 17I, 5R, 1GB	John T. Morgan (D)	James L. Pugh (D)	8D	
1884	Edward A. O'Neal (D)	no such office	Ellis Phelan (D)	Thomas McClellan (D)	Malcolm C. Burke	Frederick Smith	Edward C. Betts (D)	31D, 2R	77D, 17I, 5R, 1GB	John T. Morgan (D)	James L. Pugh (D)	7D, 1R	Cleveland/ Hendricks (D) ✓
1885	Edward A. O'Neal (D)	no such office	Charles C. Langdon (D)	Thomas McClellan (D)	Malcolm C. Burke	Frederick Smith	Edward C. Betts (D)	30D, 3R	93D, 7R	John T. Morgan (D)	James L. Pugh (D)	8D	Cleveland/ Hendricks (D) ✓
1886	Edward A. O'Neal (D)	no such office	Charles C. Langdon (D)	Thomas McClellan (D)	Malcolm C. Burke	Frederick Smith	Edward C. Betts (D)	30D, 3R	93D, 7R	John T. Morgan (D)	James L. Pugh (D)	8D	Cleveland/ Hendricks (D) ✓
1887	Thomas Seay (D)	no such office	Charles C. Langdon (D)	Thomas McClellan (D)	Malcolm C. Burke	Frederick Smith	Reuben Kolb (D)	32D, 1R	83D, 17R	John T. Morgan (D)	James L. Pugh (D)	8D	Cleveland/ Hendricks (D) ✓
1888	Thomas Seay (D)	no such office	Charles C. Langdon (D)	Thomas McClellan (D)	Cyrus D. Hogue	John Cobbs (D)	Reuben Kolb (D)	32D, 1R	83D, 17R	John T. Morgan (D)	James L. Pugh (D)	8D	Cleveland/ Thurman (D) ✗
1889	Thomas Seay (D)	no such office	Charles C. Langdon (D)	William L. Martin (D)	Cyrus D. Hogue	John Cobbs (D)	Reuben Kolb (D)	32D, 1R	92D, 8R	John T. Morgan (D)	James L. Pugh (D)	8D	Cleveland/ Thurman (D) ✗
1890	Thomas Seay (D)	no such office	Joseph D. Barron (D)	William L. Martin (D)	Cyrus D. Hogue	John Cobbs (D)	Reuben Kolb (D)	32D, 1R	92D, 8R	John T. Morgan (D)	James L. Pugh (D)	7D, 1R	Cleveland/ Thurman (D) ✗
1891	Thomas G. Jones (D)	no such office	Joseph D. Barron (D)	William L. Martin (D)	Cyrus D. Hogue	John Cobbs (D)	Hector D. Lane (D)	33D	97D, 3R	John T. Morgan (D)	James L. Pugh (D)	8D	Cleveland/ Thurman (D) ✗
1892	Thomas G. Jones (D)	no such office	Joseph D. Barron (D)	William L. Martin (D)	John Purifoy (D)	J. Craig Smith (D)	Hector D. Lane (D)	33D	97D, 3R	John T. Morgan (D)	James L. Pugh (D)	8D	Cleveland/ Stevenson (D) ✓
1893	Thomas G. Jones (D)	no such office	Joseph D. Barron (D)	William L. Martin (D)	John Purifoy (D)	J. Craig Smith (D)	Hector D. Lane (D)	26D, 7Pop	61D, 38Pop, 1R	John T. Morgan (D)	James L. Pugh (D)	9D	Cleveland/ Stevenson (D) ✓
1894	Thomas G. Jones (D)	no such office	James K. Jackson (D)	William C. Fitts (D)	John Purifoy (D)	J. Craig Smith (D)	Hector D. Lane (D)	26D, 7Pop	61D, 38Pop, 1R	John T. Morgan (D)	James L. Pugh (D)	9D	Cleveland/ Stevenson (D) ✓
1895	William C. Oates (D)	no such office	James K. Jackson (D)	William C. Fitts (D)	John Purifoy (D)	J. Craig Smith (D)	Hector D. Lane (D)	24D, 8Pop, 1R	65D, 34Pop, 1R	John T. Morgan (D)	James L. Pugh (D)	8D, 1Pop	Cleveland/ Stevenson (D) ✓
1896	William C. Oates (D)	no such office	James K. Jackson (D)	William C. Fitts (D)	Walter S. White	George Ellis (D)	Issac F. Culver (D)	24D, 8Pop, 1R	65D, 34Pop, 1R	John T. Morgan (D)	James L. Pugh (D)	5D, 2Pop, 2R	Bryan/ Sewall (D) ✗
1897	Joseph F. Johnston (D)	no such office	James K. Jackson (D)	William C. Fitts (D)	Walter S. White	George Ellis (D)	Issac F. Culver (D)	22D, 9Pop, 2R	74D, 23Pop, 3R	John T. Morgan (D)	Edmund Pettus (D)	8D, 1Pop	Bryan/ Sewall (D) ✗
1898	Joseph F. Johnston (D)	no such office	Robert P. McDavid (D)	Charles G. Brown	Walter S. White	George Ellis (D)	Issac F. Culver (D)	22D, 9Pop, 2R	74D, 23Pop, 3R	John T. Morgan (D)	Edmund Pettus (D)	7D, 1Pop, 1R	Bryan/ Sewall (D) ✗
1899	Joseph F. Johnston (D)	no such office	Robert P. McDavid (D)	Charles G. Brown	Walter S. White	George Ellis (D)	Issac F. Culver (D)	28D, 5Pop	89D, 10Pop, 1R	John T. Morgan (D)	Edmund Pettus (D)	9D	Bryan/ Sewall (D) ✗
1900	Joseph F. Johnston (D)	no such office	Robert P. McDavid (D)	Charles G. Brown	Thomas L. Sowell (D)	J. Craig Smith (D)	Robert R. Poole (D)	28D, 5Pop	89D, 10Pop, 1R	John T. Morgan (D)	Edmund Pettus (D)	9D	Bryan/ Stevenson (D) ✗
1900	William D. Jelks (D) (Note: Acting governor for 26 days. Jelks was president of the state Senate when William J. Samford was out of state at the start of his term seeking medical treatment.)	no such office	Robert P. McDavid (D)	Charles G. Brown	Thomas L. Sowell (D)	J. Craig Smith (D)	Robert R. Poole (D)	28D, 5Pop	89D, 10Pop, 1R	John T. Morgan (D)	Edmund Pettus (D)	8D, 1R	Bryan/ Stevenson (D) ✗
1901	William J. Samford (D)	no such office	Robert P. McDavid (D)	Charles G. Brown	Thomas L. Sowell (D)	J. Craig Smith (D)	Robert R. Poole (D)	32D, 1Pop	92D, 6Pop, 2R	John T. Morgan (D)	Edmund Pettus (D)	9D	Bryan/ Stevenson (D) ✗
1901	William D. Jelks (D) (Note: As president of the state Senate, filled unexpired term and was subsequently elected in his or her own right.) (Note: Gubernatorial terms were increased from two to four years during Jelks' governorship; his first term was filling out Samford's two-year term, and he was subsequently elected in 1902 for a four-year term.)	no such office	Robert P. McDavid (D)	Charles G. Brown	Thomas L. Sowell (D)	J. Craig Smith (D)	Robert R. Poole (D)	32D, 1Pop	92D, 6Pop, 2R	John T. Morgan (D)	Edmund Pettus (D)	9D	Bryan/ Stevenson (D) ✗
1902	William D. Jelks (D)	no such office	Robert P. McDavid (D)	Charles G. Brown	Thomas L. Sowell (D)	J. Craig Smith (D)	Robert R. Poole (D)	32D, 1Pop	92D, 6Pop, 2R	John T. Morgan (D)	Edmund Pettus (D)	9D	Bryan/ Stevenson (D) ✗
1903	William D. Jelks (D)	Russell McWhortor; Cunningham (D) (Note: Acting governor from April 25, 1904 until March 5, 1905 while Jelks was out of state for medical treatment.)	J. Thomas Heflin (D)	Massey Wilson (D)	Thomas L. Sowell (D)	J. Craig Smith (D)	Robert R. Poole (D)	35D	103D, 2R	John T. Morgan (D)	Edmund Pettus (D)	9D	Bryan/ Stevenson (D) ✗
1904	William D. Jelks (D)	Russell McWhortor; Cunningham (D)	Edmund R. McDavid (D)	Massey Wilson (D)	Thomas L. Sowell (D)	J. Craig Smith (D)	Robert R. Poole (D)	35D	103D, 2R	John T. Morgan (D)	Edmund Pettus (D)	9D	Parker/ Davis (D) ✗
1905	William D. Jelks (D)	Russell McWhortor; Cunningham (D)	Edmund R. McDavid (D)	Massey Wilson (D)	J. Malcolm Carmichael	J. Craig Smith (D)	Robert R. Poole (D)	35D	103D, 2R	John T. Morgan (D)	Edmund Pettus (D)	9D	Parker/ Davis (D) ✗
1906	William D. Jelks (D)	Russell McWhortor; Cunningham (D)	Edmund R. McDavid (D)	Massey Wilson (D)	J. Malcolm Carmichael	J. Craig Smith (D)	Robert R. Poole (D)	35D	103D, 2R	John T. Morgan (D)	Edmund Pettus (D)	9D	Parker/ Davis (D) ✗
1907	B. B. Comer (D)	Henry B. Gray (D)	Frank N. Julian (D)	Alexander M. Garber (D)	William W. Brandon (D)	Walter D. Seed Sr. (D)	Joseph A. Wilkinson (D)	34D, 1R	104D, 2R	John H. Bankhead (D)	Joseph F. Johnston (D)	9D	Parker/ Davis (D) ✗
1908	B. B. Comer (D)	Henry B. Gray (D)	Frank N. Julian (D)	Alexander M. Garber (D)	William W. Brandon (D)	Walter D. Seed Sr. (D)	Joseph A. Wilkinson (D)	34D, 1R	104D, 2R	John H. Bankhead (D)	Joseph F. Johnston (D)	9D	Bryan/ Kern (D) ✗
1909	B. B. Comer (D)	Henry B. Gray (D)	Frank N. Julian (D)	Alexander M. Garber (D)	William W. Brandon (D)	Walter D. Seed Sr. (D)	Joseph A. Wilkinson (D)	34D, 1R	104D, 2R	John H. Bankhead (D)	Joseph F. Johnston (D)	9D	Bryan/ Kern (D) ✗
1910	B. B. Comer (D)	Henry B. Gray (D)	Cyrus B. Brown (D)	Alexander M. Garber (D)	William W. Brandon (D)	Walter D. Seed Sr. (D)	Joseph A. Wilkinson (D)	34D, 1R	104D, 2R	John H. Bankhead (D)	Joseph F. Johnston (D)	9D	Bryan/ Kern (D) ✗
1911	Emmet O'Neal (D)	Walter D. Seed Sr. (D)	Cyrus B. Brown (D)	Robert Brickell (D)	Charles Brooks Smith (D)	John Purifoy (D)	Reuben Kolb (D)	34D, 1R	103D, 3R	John H. Bankhead (D)	Joseph F. Johnston (D)	9D	Bryan/ Kern (D) ✗
1912	Emmet O'Neal (D)	Walter D. Seed Sr. (D)	Cyrus B. Brown (D)	Robert Brickell (D)	Charles Brooks Smith (D)	John Purifoy (D)	Reuben Kolb (D)	34D, 1R	103D, 3R	John H. Bankhead (D)	Joseph F. Johnston (D)	9D	Wilson/ Marshall (D) ✓
1913	Emmet O'Neal (D)	Walter D. Seed Sr. (D)	Cyrus B. Brown (D)	Robert Brickell (D)	Charles Brooks Smith (D)	John Purifoy (D)	Reuben Kolb (D)	34D, 1R	103D, 3R	John H. Bankhead (D)	Joseph F. Johnston (D)	10D	Wilson/ Marshall (D) ✓
1914	Emmet O'Neal (D)	Walter D. Seed Sr. (D)	Cyrus B. Brown (D)	Robert Brickell (D)	Charles Brooks Smith (D)	John Purifoy (D)	Reuben Kolb (D)	34D, 1R	103D, 3R	John H. Bankhead (D)	Francis S. White (D)	10D	Wilson/ Marshall (D) ✓
1915	Charles Henderson (D)	Thomas Kilby (D)	John Purifoy (D)	William Logan Martin (D)	Miles C. Allgood (D)	William Lancaster (D)	James A. Wade (D)	34D, 1R	104D, 2R	John H. Bankhead (D)	Oscar Underwood (D)	10D	Wilson/ Marshall (D) ✓
1916	Charles Henderson (D)	Thomas Kilby (D)	John Purifoy (D)	William Logan Martin (D)	Miles C. Allgood (D)	William Lancaster (D)	James A. Wade (D)	34D, 1R	104D, 2R	John H. Bankhead (D)	Oscar Underwood (D)	10D	Wilson/ Marshall (D) ✓
1917	Charles Henderson (D)	Thomas Kilby (D)	John Purifoy (D)	William Logan Martin (D)	Miles C. Allgood (D)	William Lancaster (D)	James A. Wade (D)	34D, 1R	104D, 2R	John H. Bankhead (D)	Oscar Underwood (D)	10D	Wilson/ Marshall (D) ✓
1918	Charles Henderson (D)	Thomas Kilby (D)	John Purifoy (D)	F. Lloyd Tate	Miles C. Allgood (D)	William Lancaster (D)	James A. Wade (D)	34D, 1R	104D, 2R	John H. Bankhead (D)	Oscar Underwood (D)	10D	Wilson/ Marshall (D) ✓
1918	Charles Henderson (D)	Thomas Kilby (D)	John Purifoy (D)	Emmet S. Thigpen	Miles C. Allgood (D)	William Lancaster (D)	James A. Wade (D)	34D, 1R	104D, 2R	John H. Bankhead (D)	Oscar Underwood (D)	10D	Wilson/ Marshall (D) ✓
1919	Thomas Kilby (D)	Nathan Lee Miller (D)	William Peyton Cobb (D)	J. Q. Smith (D)	Henry F. Lee (D)	Robert Bradley	Miles C. Allgood (D)	34D, 1R	100D, 5R, 1?	John H. Bankhead (D)	Oscar Underwood (D)	10D	Wilson/ Marshall (D) ✓
1920	Thomas Kilby (D)	Nathan Lee Miller (D)	William Peyton Cobb (D)	J. Q. Smith (D)	Henry F. Lee (D)	Robert Bradley	Miles C. Allgood (D)	34D, 1R	100D, 5R, 1?	B. B. Comer (D)	Oscar Underwood (D)	10D	Cox/ Roosevelt (D) ✗
1921	Thomas Kilby (D)	Nathan Lee Miller (D)	William Peyton Cobb (D)	Harwell Goodwin Davis (D)	Henry F. Lee (D)	Robert Bradley	Miles C. Allgood (D)	34D, 1R	100D, 5R, 1?	J. Thomas Heflin (D)	Oscar Underwood (D)	10D	Cox/ Roosevelt (D) ✗
1922	Thomas Kilby (D)	Nathan Lee Miller (D)	William Peyton Cobb (D)	Harwell Goodwin Davis (D)	Henry F. Lee (D)	Robert Bradley	Miles C. Allgood (D)	34D, 1R	100D, 5R, 1?	J. Thomas Heflin (D)	Oscar Underwood (D)	10D	Cox/ Roosevelt (D) ✗
1923	William W. Brandon (D)	Charles S. McDowell (D) (Note: Acting governor for two days—July 10 and 11, 1924—while Brandon was out of state for 21 days as a delegate to the 1924 Democratic National Convention.)	Sidney H. Blan (D)	Harwell Goodwin Davis (D)	William B. Allgood (D)	George Ellis (D)	James Monroe Moore (D)	35D	105D, 1R	J. Thomas Heflin (D)	Oscar Underwood (D)	10D	Cox/ Roosevelt (D) ✗
1924	William W. Brandon (D)	Charles S. McDowell (D)	Sidney H. Blan (D)	Harwell Goodwin Davis (D)	William B. Allgood (D)	George Ellis (D)	James Monroe Moore (D)	35D	105D, 1R	J. Thomas Heflin (D)	Oscar Underwood (D)	10D	Davis/ Bryan (D) ✗
1925	William W. Brandon (D)	Charles S. McDowell (D)	Sidney H. Blan (D)	Harwell Goodwin Davis (D)	William B. Allgood (D)	George Ellis (D)	James Monroe Moore (D)	35D	105D, 1R	J. Thomas Heflin (D)	Oscar Underwood (D)	10D	Davis/ Bryan (D) ✗
1926	William W. Brandon (D)	Charles S. McDowell (D)	Sidney H. Blan (D)	Harwell Goodwin Davis (D)	William B. Allgood (D)	George Ellis (D)	James Monroe Moore (D)	35D	105D, 1R	J. Thomas Heflin (D)	Oscar Underwood (D)	10D	Davis/ Bryan (D) ✗
1927	Bibb Graves (D)	William C. Davis (D)	John Marvin Brandon (D)	Charlie C. McCall (D)	Sidney H. Blan (D)	William B. Allgood (D)	Samuel Dunwoody (D)	35D	104D, 2R	J. Thomas Heflin (D)	Hugo Black (D)	10D	Davis/ Bryan (D) ✗
1928	Bibb Graves (D)	William C. Davis (D)	John Marvin Brandon (D)	Charlie C. McCall (D)	Sidney H. Blan (D)	William B. Allgood (D)	Samuel Dunwoody (D)	35D	104D, 2R	J. Thomas Heflin (D)	Hugo Black (D)	10D	Smith/ Robinson (D) ✗
1929	Bibb Graves (D)	William C. Davis (D)	John Marvin Brandon (D)	Charlie C. McCall (D)	Sidney H. Blan (D)	William B. Allgood (D)	Samuel Dunwoody (D)	35D	104D, 2R	J. Thomas Heflin (D)	Hugo Black (D)	10D	Smith/ Robinson (D) ✗
1930	Bibb Graves (D)	William C. Davis (D)	John Marvin Brandon (D)	Charlie C. McCall (D)	Sidney H. Blan (D)	William B. Allgood (D)	Samuel Dunwoody (D)	35D	104D, 2R	J. Thomas Heflin (D)	Hugo Black (D)	10D	Smith/ Robinson (D) ✗
1931	Benjamin M. Miller (D)	Hugh Davis Merrill (D)	Pete Bryant Jarman Jr. (D)	Thomas E. Knight Jr. (D)	John Marvin Brandon (D)	Sidney H. Blan (D)	Seth Paddock Storrs (D)	35D	103D, 3R	John H. Bankhead II (D)	Hugo Black (D)	10D	Smith/ Robinson (D) ✗
1932	Benjamin M. Miller (D)	Hugh Davis Merrill (D)	Pete Bryant Jarman Jr. (D)	Thomas E. Knight Jr. (D)	John Marvin Brandon (D)	Sidney H. Blan (D)	Seth Paddock Storrs (D)	35D	103D, 3R	John H. Bankhead II (D)	Hugo Black (D)	10D	Roosevelt/ Garner (D) ✓
1933	Benjamin M. Miller (D)	Hugh Davis Merrill (D)	Pete Bryant Jarman Jr. (D)	Thomas E. Knight Jr. (D)	John Marvin Brandon (D)	Sidney H. Blan (D)	Seth Paddock Storrs (D)	35D	103D, 3R	John H. Bankhead II (D)	Hugo Black (D)	9D	Roosevelt/ Garner (D) ✓
1934	Benjamin M. Miller (D)	Hugh Davis Merrill (D)	Pete Bryant Jarman Jr. (D)	Thomas E. Knight Jr. (D)	John Marvin Brandon (D)	Sidney H. Blan (D)	Seth Paddock Storrs (D)	35D	103D, 3R	John H. Bankhead II (D)	Hugo Black (D)	9D	Roosevelt/ Garner (D) ✓
1935	Bibb Graves (D)	Thomas E. Knight	David Howell Turner (D)	Albert A. Carmichael (D)	Charles E. McCall (D)	John Marvin Brandon (D)	Robert James Goode (D)	35D	105D, 1R	John H. Bankhead II (D)	Hugo Black (D)	9D	Roosevelt/ Garner (D) ✓
1936	Bibb Graves (D)	Thomas E. Knight	David Howell Turner (D)	Albert A. Carmichael (D)	Charles E. McCall (D)	John Marvin Brandon (D)	Robert James Goode (D)	35D	105D, 1R	John H. Bankhead II (D)	Hugo Black (D)	9D	Roosevelt/ Garner (D) ✓
1937	Bibb Graves (D)	Thomas E. Knight	David Howell Turner (D)	Albert A. Carmichael (D)	Charles E. McCall (D)	John Marvin Brandon (D)	Robert James Goode (D)	35D	105D, 1R	John H. Bankhead II (D)	Dixie Bibb Graves (D)	9D	Roosevelt/ Garner (D) ✓
1938	Bibb Graves (D)	Thomas E. Knight	David Howell Turner (D)	Albert A. Carmichael (D)	Charles E. McCall (D)	John Marvin Brandon (D)	Robert James Goode (D)	35D	105D, 1R	John H. Bankhead II (D)	J. Lister Hill (D)	9D	Roosevelt/ Garner (D) ✓
1939	Frank M. Dixon (D)	Albert A. Carmichael (D)	John Marvin Brandon (D)	Thomas S. Lawson (D)	David Howell Turner (D)	Charles E. McCall (D)	Haygood Paterson (D)	35D	105D, 1R	John H. Bankhead II (D)	J. Lister Hill (D)	9D	Roosevelt/ Garner (D) ✓
1940	Frank M. Dixon (D)	Albert A. Carmichael (D)	John Marvin Brandon (D)	Thomas S. Lawson (D)	David Howell Turner (D)	Charles E. McCall (D)	Haygood Paterson (D)	35D	105D, 1R	John H. Bankhead II (D)	J. Lister Hill (D)	9D	Roosevelt/ Wallace (D) ✓
1941	Frank M. Dixon (D)	Albert A. Carmichael (D)	John Marvin Brandon (D)	Thomas S. Lawson (D)	David Howell Turner (D)	Walter Lusk	Haygood Paterson (D)	35D	105D, 1R	John H. Bankhead II (D)	J. Lister Hill (D)	9D	Roosevelt/ Wallace (D) ✓
1942	Frank M. Dixon (D)	Albert A. Carmichael (D)	John Marvin Brandon (D)	Thomas S. Lawson (D)	David Howell Turner (D)	Walter Lusk	Haygood Paterson (D)	35D	105D, 1R	John H. Bankhead II (D)	J. Lister Hill (D)	9D	Roosevelt/ Wallace (D) ✓
1943	Chauncey Sparks (D)	Leven H. Ellis (D)	David Howell Turner (D)	William N. McQueen (D)	John Marvin Brandon (D)	Walter Lusk	Joseph N. Poole	35D	105D, 1R	John H. Bankhead II (D)	J. Lister Hill (D)	9D	Roosevelt/ Wallace (D) ✓
1944	Chauncey Sparks (D)	Leven H. Ellis (D)	Sibyl Pool (D)	William N. McQueen (D)	John Marvin Brandon (D)	Walter Lusk	Joseph N. Poole	35D	105D, 1R	John H. Bankhead II (D)	J. Lister Hill (D)	9D	Roosevelt/ Truman (D) ✓
1945	Chauncey Sparks (D)	Leven H. Ellis (D)	Sibyl Pool (D)	William N. McQueen (D)	John Marvin Brandon (D)	Walter Lusk	Joseph N. Poole	35D	105D, 1R	John H. Bankhead II (D)	J. Lister Hill (D)	9D	Roosevelt/ Truman (D) ✓
1946	Chauncey Sparks (D)	Leven H. Ellis (D)	Sibyl Pool (D)	William N. McQueen (D)	John Marvin Brandon (D)	Walter Lusk	Joseph N. Poole	35D	105D, 1R	George R. Swift (D)	J. Lister Hill (D)	9D	Roosevelt/ Truman (D) ✓
1947	Jim Folsom (D)	James C. Inzer (D)	Sibyl Pool (D)	Albert A. Carmichael (D)	Daniel H. Thomas Sr.	John Marvin Brandon (D)	Haygood Paterson (D)	35D	105D, 1R	John Sparkman (D)	J. Lister Hill (D)	9D	Roosevelt/ Truman (D) ✓
1948	Jim Folsom (D)	James C. Inzer (D)	Sibyl Pool (D)	Albert A. Carmichael (D)	Daniel H. Thomas Sr.	John Marvin Brandon (D)	Haygood Paterson (D)	35D	105D, 1R	John Sparkman (D)	J. Lister Hill (D)	9D	Thurmond/ Wright (Dix) ✗
1949	Jim Folsom (D)	James C. Inzer (D)	Sibyl Pool (D)	Albert A. Carmichael (D)	Daniel H. Thomas Sr.	John Marvin Brandon (D)	Haygood Paterson (D)	35D	105D, 1R	John Sparkman (D)	J. Lister Hill (D)	9D	Thurmond/ Wright (Dix) ✗
1950	Jim Folsom (D)	James C. Inzer (D)	Sibyl Pool (D)	Albert A. Carmichael (D)	Daniel H. Thomas Sr.	John Marvin Brandon (D)	Haygood Paterson (D)	35D	105D, 1R	John Sparkman (D)	J. Lister Hill (D)	9D	Thurmond/ Wright (Dix) ✗
1951	Gordon Persons (D)	James Allen (D)	Agnes Baggett (D)	Si Garrett (D)	John Marvin Brandon (D)	Sibyl Pool (D)	Frank M. Stewart (D)	35D	105D, 1R	John Sparkman (D)	J. Lister Hill (D)	9D	Thurmond/ Wright (Dix) ✗
1952	Gordon Persons (D)	James Allen (D)	Agnes Baggett (D)	Si Garrett (D)	John Marvin Brandon (D)	Sibyl Pool (D)	Frank M. Stewart (D)	35D	105D, 1R	John Sparkman (D)	J. Lister Hill (D)	9D	Stevenson/ Sparkman (D) ✗
1953	Gordon Persons (D)	James Allen (D)	Agnes Baggett (D)	Si Garrett (D)	John Marvin Brandon (D)	Sibyl Pool (D)	Frank M. Stewart (D)	35D	105D, 1R	John Sparkman (D)	J. Lister Hill (D)	9D	Stevenson/ Sparkman (D) ✗
1954	Gordon Persons (D)	James Allen (D)	Agnes Baggett (D)	Si Garrett (D)	John Marvin Brandon (D)	Sibyl Pool (D)	Frank M. Stewart (D)	35D	105D, 1R	John Sparkman (D)	J. Lister Hill (D)	9D	Stevenson/ Sparkman (D) ✗
1955	Jim Folsom (D)	William G. Hardwick (D)	Mary Texas Hurt Garner (D)	John M. Patterson (D)	Agnes Baggett (D)	John Marvin Brandon (D)	A. W. Todd (D)	35D	105D, 1R	John Sparkman (D)	J. Lister Hill (D)	9D	Stevenson/ Sparkman (D) ✗
1956	Jim Folsom (D)	William G. Hardwick (D)	Mary Texas Hurt Garner (D)	John M. Patterson (D)	Agnes Baggett (D)	John Marvin Brandon (D)	A. W. Todd (D)	35D	105D, 1R	John Sparkman (D)	J. Lister Hill (D)	9D	Stevenson/ Kefauver (D) ✗
1957	Jim Folsom (D)	William G. Hardwick (D)	Mary Texas Hurt Garner (D)	John M. Patterson (D)	Agnes Baggett (D)	John Marvin Brandon (D)	A. W. Todd (D)	35D	105D, 1R	John Sparkman (D)	J. Lister Hill (D)	9D	Stevenson/ Kefauver (D) ✗
1958	Jim Folsom (D)	William G. Hardwick (D)	Mary Texas Hurt Garner (D)	John M. Patterson (D)	Agnes Baggett (D)	John Marvin Brandon (D)	A. W. Todd (D)	35D	105D, 1R	John Sparkman (D)	J. Lister Hill (D)	9D	Stevenson/ Kefauver (D) ✗
1959	John M. Patterson (D)	Albert Boutwell (D)	Bettye Frink (D)	MacDonald Gallion (D)	Mary Texas Hurt Garner (D)	Agnes Baggett (D)	Robert Bamberg (D)	35D	106D	John Sparkman (D)	J. Lister Hill (D)	9D	Stevenson/ Kefauver (D) ✗
1960	John M. Patterson (D)	Albert Boutwell (D)	Bettye Frink (D)	MacDonald Gallion (D)	Mary Texas Hurt Garner (D)	Agnes Baggett (D)	Robert Bamberg (D)	35D	106D	John Sparkman (D)	J. Lister Hill (D)	9D	6 – Byrd/ Thurmond (Dix) ✗ 5 – Kennedy/ Johnson (D) ✓
1961	John M. Patterson (D)	Albert Boutwell (D)	Bettye Frink (D)	MacDonald Gallion (D)	Mary Texas Hurt Garner (D)	Agnes Baggett (D)	Robert Bamberg (D)	35D	106D	John Sparkman (D)	J. Lister Hill (D)	9D	6 – Byrd/ Thurmond (Dix) ✗ 5 – Kennedy/ Johnson (D) ✓
1962	John M. Patterson (D)	Albert Boutwell (D)	Bettye Frink (D)	MacDonald Gallion (D)	Mary Texas Hurt Garner (D)	Agnes Baggett (D)	Robert Bamberg (D)	35D	106D	John Sparkman (D)	J. Lister Hill (D)	9D	6 – Byrd/ Thurmond (Dix) ✗ 5 – Kennedy/ Johnson (D) ✓
1963	George Wallace (D)	James Allen (D)	Agnes Baggett (D)	Richmond Flowers Sr. (D)	Bettye Frink (D)	Mary Texas Hurt Garner (D)	A. W. Todd (D)	35D	104D, 2R	John Sparkman (D)	J. Lister Hill (D)	8D	6 – Byrd/ Thurmond (Dix) ✗ 5 – Kennedy/ Johnson (D) ✓
1964	George Wallace (D)	James Allen (D)	Agnes Baggett (D)	Richmond Flowers Sr. (D)	Bettye Frink (D)	Mary Texas Hurt Garner (D)	A. W. Todd (D)	35D	104D, 2R	John Sparkman (D)	J. Lister Hill (D)	8D	Goldwater/ Miller (R) ✗
1965	George Wallace (D)	James Allen (D)	Agnes Baggett (D)	Richmond Flowers Sr. (D)	Bettye Frink (D)	Mary Texas Hurt Garner (D)	A. W. Todd (D)	35D	104D, 2R	John Sparkman (D)	J. Lister Hill (D)	5R, 3D	Goldwater/ Miller (R) ✗
1966	George Wallace (D)	James Allen (D)	Agnes Baggett (D)	Richmond Flowers Sr. (D)	Bettye Frink (D)	Mary Texas Hurt Garner (D)	A. W. Todd (D)	35D	104D, 2R	John Sparkman (D)	J. Lister Hill (D)	5R, 3D	Goldwater/ Miller (R) ✗
1967	Lurleen Wallace (D)	Albert Brewer (D) (Note: Wallace left the state for 20 days for medical treatment; as lieutenant governor, Brewer became acting governor on July 25, 1967. Wallace returned to the state later that day.)	Mabel Sanders Amos (D)	MacDonald Gallion (D)	Melba Till Allen (D)	Agnes Baggett (D)	Richard Beard (D)	34D, 1R	106D	John Sparkman (D)	J. Lister Hill (D)	5D, 3R	Goldwater/ Miller (R) ✗
1968	Lurleen Wallace (D)	Albert Brewer (D)	Mabel Sanders Amos (D)	MacDonald Gallion (D)	Melba Till Allen (D)	Agnes Baggett (D)	Richard Beard (D)	34D, 1R	106D	John Sparkman (D)	J. Lister Hill (D)	5D, 3R	Wallace/ LeMay (AI) ✗
1968	Albert Brewer (D) (Note: As lieutenant governor, filled unexpired term.)	vacant	Mabel Sanders Amos (D)	MacDonald Gallion (D)	Melba Till Allen (D)	Agnes Baggett (D)	Richard Beard (D)	34D, 1R	106D	John Sparkman (D)	J. Lister Hill (D)	5D, 3R	Wallace/ LeMay (AI) ✗
1969	Albert Brewer (D)	vacant	Mabel Sanders Amos (D)	MacDonald Gallion (D)	Melba Till Allen (D)	Agnes Baggett (D)	Richard Beard (D)	34D, 1R	106D	John Sparkman (D)	James Allen (D)	5D, 3R	Wallace/ LeMay (AI) ✗
1970	Albert Brewer (D)	vacant	Mabel Sanders Amos (D)	MacDonald Gallion (D)	Melba Till Allen (D)	Agnes Baggett (D)	Richard Beard (D)	34D, 1R	106D	John Sparkman (D)	James Allen (D)	5D, 3R	Wallace/ LeMay (AI) ✗
1971	George Wallace (D)	Jere Beasley (D) (Note: Acting governor for 32 days, from June 5 until July 7, 1972. Beasley was lieutenant governor when Wallace spent 52 days in Maryland for medical treatment following an assassination attempt while campaigning for president of the United States.)	Mabel Sanders Amos (D)	Bill Baxley (D)	Melba Till Allen (D)	Agnes Baggett (D)	Richard Beard (D)	35D	104D, 2R	John Sparkman (D)	James Allen (D)	5D, 3R	Wallace/ LeMay (AI) ✗
1972	George Wallace (D)	Jere Beasley (D)	Mabel Sanders Amos (D)	Bill Baxley (D)	Melba Till Allen (D)	Agnes Baggett (D)	Marion Gilmer (D)	35D	104D, 2R	John Sparkman (D)	James Allen (D)	5D, 3R	Nixon/ Agnew (R) ✓
1973	George Wallace (D)	Jere Beasley (D)	Mabel Sanders Amos (D)	Bill Baxley (D)	Melba Till Allen (D)	Agnes Baggett (D)	Marion Gilmer (D)	35D	104D, 2R	John Sparkman (D)	James Allen (D)	4D, 3R	Nixon/ Agnew (R) ✓
1974	George Wallace (D)	Jere Beasley (D)	Mabel Sanders Amos (D)	Bill Baxley (D)	Melba Till Allen (D)	Agnes Baggett (D)	McMillan Lane (D)	35D	104D, 2R	John Sparkman (D)	James Allen (D)	4D, 3R	Nixon/ Agnew (R) ✓
1975	George Wallace (D)	Jere Beasley (D)	Agnes Baggett (D)	Bill Baxley (D)	Bettye Frink (D)	Melba Till Allen (D)	McMillan Lane (D)	35D	105D	John Sparkman (D)	James Allen (D)	4D, 3R	Nixon/ Agnew (R) ✓
1976	George Wallace (D)	Jere Beasley (D)	Agnes Baggett (D)	Bill Baxley (D)	Bettye Frink (D)	Melba Till Allen (D)	McMillan Lane (D)	35D	105D	John Sparkman (D)	James Allen (D)	4D, 3R	Carter/ Mondale (D) ✓
1977	George Wallace (D)	Jere Beasley (D)	Agnes Baggett (D)	Bill Baxley (D)	Bettye Frink (D)	Melba Till Allen (D)	McMillan Lane (D)	34D, 1I (Note: Independent Oscar Peden was elected in a February 1977 special election.)	105D	John Sparkman (D)	James Allen (D)	4D, 3R	Carter/ Mondale (D) ✓
1978	George Wallace (D)	Jere Beasley (D)	Agnes Baggett (D)	Bill Baxley (D)	Bettye Frink (D)	Annie Laurie Gunter (D)	McMillan Lane (D)	34D, 1I	105D	John Sparkman (D)	Maryon Pittman Allen (D)	4D, 3R	Carter/ Mondale (D) ✓
1979	Fob James (D)	George McMillan (D)	Don Siegelman (D)	Charles Graddick (D)	Bettye Frink (D)	Annie Laurie Gunter (D)	McMillan Lane (D)	35D	101D, 4R	Howell Heflin (D)	Donald Stewart (D)	4D, 3R	Carter/ Mondale (D) ✓
1980	Fob James (D)	George McMillan (D)	Don Siegelman (D)	Charles Graddick (D)	Bettye Frink (D)	Annie Laurie Gunter (D)	McMillan Lane (D)	35D	101D, 4R	Howell Heflin (D)	Donald Stewart (D)	4D, 3R	Reagan/ Bush (R) ✓
1981	Fob James (D)	George McMillan (D)	Don Siegelman (D)	Charles Graddick (D)	Bettye Frink (D)	Annie Laurie Gunter (D)	McMillan Lane (D)	35D	101D, 4R	Howell Heflin (D)	Jeremiah Denton (R)	4D, 3R	Reagan/ Bush (R) ✓
1982	Fob James (D)	George McMillan (D)	Don Siegelman (D)	Charles Graddick (D)	Bettye Frink (D)	Annie Laurie Gunter (D)	McMillan Lane (D)	35D	101D, 4R	Howell Heflin (D)	Jeremiah Denton (R)	4D, 3R	Reagan/ Bush (R) ✓
1983	George Wallace (D)	Bill Baxley (D)	Don Siegelman (D)	Charles Graddick (D)	Jan Cook (D)	Annie Laurie Gunter (D)	Albert McDonald (D)	32D, 3R	97D, 8R	Howell Heflin (D)	Jeremiah Denton (R)	5D, 2R	Reagan/ Bush (R) ✓
1983	George Wallace (D)	Bill Baxley (D)	Don Siegelman (D)	Charles Graddick (D)	Jan Cook (D)	Annie Laurie Gunter (D)	Albert McDonald (D)	32D, 4R (Note: Larry Dixon switched from the Democratic Party to the Republican Party in advance of the 1983 special election.)	97D, 8R	Howell Heflin (D)	Jeremiah Denton (R)	5D, 2R	Reagan/ Bush (R) ✓
1984	George Wallace (D)	Bill Baxley (D)	Don Siegelman (D)	Charles Graddick (D)	Jan Cook (D)	Annie Laurie Gunter (D)	Albert McDonald (D)	29D, 4R, 2I	87D, 18R	Howell Heflin (D)	Jeremiah Denton (R)	5D, 2R	Reagan/ Bush (R) ✓
1985	George Wallace (D)	Bill Baxley (D)	Don Siegelman (D)	Charles Graddick (D)	Jan Cook (D)	Annie Laurie Gunter (D)	Albert McDonald (D)	29D, 4R, 2I	87D, 18R	Howell Heflin (D)	Jeremiah Denton (R)	5D, 2R	Reagan/ Bush (R) ✓
1986	George Wallace (D)	Bill Baxley (D)	Don Siegelman (D)	Charles Graddick (D)	Jan Cook (D)	Annie Laurie Gunter (D)	Albert McDonald (D)	29D, 4R, 2I	87D, 18R	Howell Heflin (D)	Jeremiah Denton (R)	5D, 2R	Reagan/ Bush (R) ✓
1987	H. Guy Hunt (R) (Note: Removed from office upon being convicted of illegally using campaign and inaugural funds to pay personal debts; he was later pardoned by the state parole board based on innocence.)	Jim Folsom Jr. (D)	Glen Browder (D)	Don Siegelman (D)	Jan Cook (D)	George Wallace Jr. (D)	Albert McDonald (D)	30D, 5R	89D, 16R	Howell Heflin (D)	Richard Shelby (D)	5D, 2R	Reagan/ Bush (R) ✓
1988	H. Guy Hunt (R)	Jim Folsom Jr. (D)	Glen Browder (D)	Don Siegelman (D)	Jan Cook (D)	George Wallace Jr. (D)	Albert McDonald (D)	30D, 5R	89D, 16R	Howell Heflin (D)	Richard Shelby (D)	5D, 2R	Bush/ Quayle (R) ✓
1989	H. Guy Hunt (R)	Jim Folsom Jr. (D)	Fred Crawford (R)	Don Siegelman (D)	Jan Cook (D)	George Wallace Jr. (D)	Albert McDonald (D)	27D, 8R (Note: Sens. John Amari, Frank "Butch" Ellis, and John Rice switched parties from Democratic to Republican.)	82D, 23R	Howell Heflin (D)	Richard Shelby (D)	5D, 2R	Bush/ Quayle (R) ✓
1990	H. Guy Hunt (R)	Jim Folsom Jr. (D)	Perry A. Hand (R)	Don Siegelman (D)	Jan Cook (D)	George Wallace Jr. (D)	Albert McDonald (D)	27D, 8R	82D, 23R	Howell Heflin (D)	Richard Shelby (D)	5D, 2R	Bush/ Quayle (R) ✓
1991	H. Guy Hunt (R)	Jim Folsom Jr. (D)	Billy Joe Camp (D)	Jimmy Evans (D)	Terry Ellis (D)	George Wallace Jr. (D)	A. W. Todd (D)	28D, 7R	82D, 23R	Howell Heflin (D)	Richard Shelby (D)	5D, 2R	Bush/ Quayle (R) ✓
1992	H. Guy Hunt (R)	Jim Folsom Jr. (D)	Billy Joe Camp (D)	Jimmy Evans (D)	Terry Ellis (D)	George Wallace Jr. (D)	A. W. Todd (D)	28D, 7R	82D, 23R	Howell Heflin (D)	Richard Shelby (D)	5D, 2R	Bush/ Quayle (R) ✗
1993	H. Guy Hunt (R)	Jim Folsom Jr. (D)	Billy Joe Camp (D)	Jimmy Evans (D)	Terry Ellis (D)	George Wallace Jr. (D)	A. W. Todd (D)	27D, 8R	82D, 23R	Howell Heflin (D)	Richard Shelby (D)	4D, 3R	Bush/ Quayle (R) ✗
1993	Jim Folsom Jr. (D)	vacant	James R. Bennett (D)	Jimmy Evans (D)	Terry Ellis (D)	George Wallace Jr. (D)	A. W. Todd (D)	27D, 8R	82D, 23R	Howell Heflin (D)	Richard Shelby (D)	4D, 3R	Bush/ Quayle (R) ✗
1994	Jim Folsom Jr. (D)	vacant	James R. Bennett (D)	Jimmy Evans (D)	Terry Ellis (D)	George Wallace Jr. (D)	A. W. Todd (D)	27D, 8R	82D, 23R	Howell Heflin (D)	Richard Shelby (D)	4D, 3R	Bush/ Quayle (R) ✗
1995	Fob James (R)	Don Siegelman (D)	James R. Bennett (D)	Jeff Sessions (R) (Note: Resigned to accept U.S. Senate seat.)	Pat Duncan (R)	Lucy Baxley (D)	Jack Thompson (R)	23D, 12R	73D, 32R	Howell Heflin (D)	Richard Shelby (R) (Note: Switched parties from Democratic to Republican in November 1994.)	4D, 3R	Bush/ Quayle (R) ✗
1996	Fob James (R)	Don Siegelman (D)	James R. Bennett (D)	Jeff Sessions (R)	Pat Duncan (R)	Lucy Baxley (D)	Jack Thompson (R)	23D, 12R	73D, 32R	Howell Heflin (D)	Richard Shelby (R)	4D, 3R	Dole/ Kemp (R) ✗
1997	Fob James (R)	Don Siegelman (D)	James R. Bennett (D)	William H. Pryor Jr. (R)	Pat Duncan (R)	Lucy Baxley (D)	Jack Thompson (R)	23D, 12R	71D, 34R (Note: Reps. H. Mac Gipson and Ronald "Ron" Johnson switch parties from Democratic to Republican.)	Jeff Sessions (R) (Note: Resigned to become United States Attorney General.)	Richard Shelby (R)	5R, 2D	Dole/ Kemp (R) ✗
1998	Fob James (R)	Don Siegelman (D)	James R. Bennett (D)	William H. Pryor Jr. (R)	Pat Duncan (R)	Lucy Baxley (D)	Jack Thompson (R)	21D, 14R (Note: Sens. Chip Bailey and Steve Windom switched parties from Democratic to Republican before the 1998 session.)	68D, 37R (Note: Reps. Gerald Allen, Steve Flowers, and Tim Parker Jr. switch parties from Democrat to Republican.)	Jeff Sessions (R)	Richard Shelby (R)	5R, 2D	Dole/ Kemp (R) ✗
1999	Don Siegelman (D)	Steve Windom (R)	James R. Bennett (R) (Note: Bennett ran as a Democrat in 1994 and as a Republican in 1998. He might have switched parties between those elections.)	William H. Pryor Jr. (R)	Susan Parker (D)	Lucy Baxley (D)	Charles Bishop (D)	23D, 12R	69D, 36R	Jeff Sessions (R)	Richard Shelby (R)	5R, 2D	Dole/ Kemp (R) ✗
2000	Don Siegelman (D)	Steve Windom (R)	James R. Bennett (R)	William H. Pryor Jr. (R)	Susan Parker (D)	Lucy Baxley (D)	Charles Bishop (D)	24D, 11R (Note: Sen. Jeff Enfinger switched parties from Republican to Democratic.)	69D, 36R	Jeff Sessions (R)	Richard Shelby (R)	5R, 2D	Bush/ Cheney (R) ✓
2001	Don Siegelman (D)	Steve Windom (R)	James R. Bennett (R)	William H. Pryor Jr. (R)	Susan Parker (D)	Lucy Baxley (D)	Charles Bishop (D)	24D, 11R	68D, 37R (Note: A Republican won a special election, flipping a seat from the Democrats.)	Jeff Sessions (R)	Richard Shelby (R)	5R, 2D	Bush/ Cheney (R) ✓
2002	Don Siegelman (D)	Steve Windom (R)	James R. Bennett (R)	William H. Pryor Jr. (R)	Susan Parker (D)	Lucy Baxley (D)	Charles Bishop (D)	24D, 11R	67D, 38R (Note: Rep. Blaine Galliher switched parties from Democratic to Republican.)	Jeff Sessions (R)	Richard Shelby (R)	5R, 2D	Bush/ Cheney (R) ✓
2003	Bob Riley (R)	Lucy Baxley (D)	Nancy Worley (D)	William H. Pryor Jr. (R)	Beth Chapman (R)	Kay Ivey (R)	Ron Sparks (D)	25D, 10R	63D, 42R (Note: Rep. Johnny Ford switched parties from Democratic to Republican right after the election, becoming the first black Republican legislator in Alabama in over a century. He resigned in 2004 and was succeeded by Democrat Pebblin Warren before the 2005 session. At the same time, Republican Nick Williams succeed longtime Democratic Rep. Jeff Dolbare in a special election, leaving the overall House partisan composition unchanged.)	Jeff Sessions (R)	Richard Shelby (R)	5R, 2D	Bush/ Cheney (R) ✓
2004	Bob Riley (R)	Lucy Baxley (D)	Nancy Worley (D)	William H. Pryor Jr. (R)	Beth Chapman (R)	Kay Ivey (R)	Ron Sparks (D)	25D, 10R	63D, 42R	Jeff Sessions (R)	Richard Shelby (R)	5R, 2D	Bush/ Cheney (R) ✓
2004	Bob Riley (R)	Lucy Baxley (D)	Nancy Worley (D)	Troy King (R)	Beth Chapman (R)	Kay Ivey (R)	Ron Sparks (D)	25D, 10R	63D, 42R	Jeff Sessions (R)	Richard Shelby (R)	5R, 2D	Bush/ Cheney (R) ✓
2005	Bob Riley (R)	Lucy Baxley (D)	Nancy Worley (D)	Troy King (R)	Beth Chapman (R)	Kay Ivey (R)	Ron Sparks (D)	25D, 10R	63D, 42R	Jeff Sessions (R)	Richard Shelby (R)	5R, 2D	Bush/ Cheney (R) ✓
2006	Bob Riley (R)	Lucy Baxley (D)	Nancy Worley (D)	Troy King (R)	Beth Chapman (R)	Kay Ivey (R)	Ron Sparks (D)	25D, 10R	62D, 43R (Note: Democratic Rep. Jack Venable died, and was succeeded by Republican Barry Mask, flipping the seat from Democratic to Republican.)	Jeff Sessions (R)	Richard Shelby (R)	5R, 2D	Bush/ Cheney (R) ✓
2007	Bob Riley (R)	Jim Folsom Jr. (D)	Beth Chapman (R)	Troy King (R)	Samantha Shaw (R)	Kay Ivey (R)	Ron Sparks (D)	23D, 12R	62D, 43R	Jeff Sessions (R)	Richard Shelby (R)	5R, 2D	Bush/ Cheney (R) ✓
2008	Bob Riley (R)	Jim Folsom Jr. (D)	Beth Chapman (R)	Troy King (R)	Samantha Shaw (R)	Kay Ivey (R)	Ron Sparks (D)	22D, 13R (Note: Sen. Jimmy Holley switched parties from Democratic to Republican.)	62D, 43R	Jeff Sessions (R)	Richard Shelby (R)	5R, 2D	McCain/ Palin (R) ✗
2009	Bob Riley (R)	Jim Folsom Jr. (D)	Beth Chapman (R)	Troy King (R)	Samantha Shaw (R)	Kay Ivey (R)	Ron Sparks (D)	21D, 13R, 1I (Note: Paul Sanford succeeded Parker Griffith after he resigned to take a Congressional seat, flipping a seat from Democratic to Republican. Sen. Harri Anne Smith was thrown out by the Republicans and became an independent at around the same time after crossing party lines to endorse Democrat Bobby Bright in his successful run for Congress.)	62D, 43R	Jeff Sessions (R)	Richard Shelby (R)	4R, 3D	McCain/ Palin (R) ✗
2010	Bob Riley (R)	Jim Folsom Jr. (D)	Beth Chapman (R)	Troy King (R)	Samantha Shaw (R)	Kay Ivey (R)	Ron Sparks (D)	20D, 14R, 1I (Note: Sen. Jim Preuitt switched parties from Democratic to Republican in the lead-up to the general election.)	60D, 45R (Note: Democratic Reps. Sue Schmitz and Lea Fite resigned and died, and were succeeded in special elections by Republicans Phil Williams and K. L. Brown, respectively, before the 2010 session.)	Jeff Sessions (R)	Richard Shelby (R)	5R, 2D (Note: Rep. Parker Griffith switched parties from Democratic to Republican.)	McCain/ Palin (R) ✗
2011	Robert J. Bentley (R) (Note: Resigned per the terms of a plea deal after being convicted of using state resources to facilitate and conceal an extramarital affair with a former staffer.)	Kay Ivey (R)	Beth Chapman (R)	Luther Strange (R)	Samantha Shaw (R)	Young Boozer (R)	John McMillan (R)	22R, 12D, 1I	66R, 39D (Note: Four representatives, Alan Boothe, Steve Hurst, Mike Millican, and Lesley Vance, switched parties from Democratic to Republican right after the election. Between the 2011 and 2012 sessions Rep. Daniel Boman switched parties from Republican to Democratic, and Rep. Alan Harper switched parties from Democratic to Republican, leaving the partisan composition of the House overall the same.)	Jeff Sessions (R)	Richard Shelby (R)	6R, 1D	McCain/ Palin (R) ✗
2012	Robert J. Bentley (R)	Kay Ivey (R)	Beth Chapman (R)	Luther Strange (R)	Samantha Shaw (R)	Young Boozer (R)	John McMillan (R)	22R, 12D, 1I	66R, 39D	Jeff Sessions (R)	Richard Shelby (R)	6R, 1D	Romney/ Ryan (R) ✗
2013	Robert J. Bentley (R)	Kay Ivey (R)	Beth Chapman (R)	Luther Strange (R)	Samantha Shaw (R)	Young Boozer (R)	John McMillan (R)	23R, 11D, 1I (Note: Sen. Jerry Fielding switched parties from Democratic to Republican.)	66R, 38D, 1I (Note: Rep. Richard Laird switched parties from Democratic to Independent, and caucused with the Republicans.)	Jeff Sessions (R)	Richard Shelby (R)	6R, 1D	Romney/ Ryan (R) ✗
2013	Robert J. Bentley (R)	Kay Ivey (R)	James R. Bennett (R)	Luther Strange (R)	Samantha Shaw (R)	Young Boozer (R)	John McMillan (R)	23R, 11D, 1I	66R, 38D, 1I	Jeff Sessions (R)	Richard Shelby (R)	6R, 1D	Romney/ Ryan (R) ✗
2014	Robert J. Bentley (R)	Kay Ivey (R)	James R. Bennett (R)	Luther Strange (R)	Samantha Shaw (R)	Young Boozer (R)	John McMillan (R)	23R, 11D, 1I	67R, 37D, 1I (Note: Rep. Charles Newton switched parties from Democratic to Republican.)	Jeff Sessions (R)	Richard Shelby (R)	6R, 1D	Romney/ Ryan (R) ✗
2015	Robert J. Bentley (R)	Kay Ivey (R)	John Merrill (R)	Luther Strange (R)	Jim Zeigler (R)	Young Boozer (R)	John McMillan (R)	26R, 8D, 1I	72R, 33D	Jeff Sessions (R)	Richard Shelby (R)	6R, 1D	Romney/ Ryan (R) ✗
2016	Robert J. Bentley (R)	Kay Ivey (R)	John Merrill (R)	Luther Strange (R)	Jim Zeigler (R)	Young Boozer (R)	John McMillan (R)	26R, 8D, 1I	72R, 33D	Jeff Sessions (R)	Richard Shelby (R)	6R, 1D	Trump/ Pence (R) ✓
2017	Robert J. Bentley (R)	Kay Ivey (R)	John Merrill (R)	Steve Marshall (R)	Jim Zeigler (R)	Young Boozer (R)	John McMillan (R)	26R, 8D, 1I	72R, 33D	Luther Strange (R)	Richard Shelby (R)	6R, 1D	Trump/ Pence (R) ✓
2017	Kay Ivey (R)	vacant	John Merrill (R)	Steve Marshall (R)	Jim Zeigler (R)	Young Boozer (R)	John McMillan (R)	26R, 8D, 1I	72R, 33D	Luther Strange (R)	Richard Shelby (R)	6R, 1D	Trump/ Pence (R) ✓
2018	Kay Ivey (R)	vacant	John Merrill (R)	Steve Marshall (R)	Jim Zeigler (R)	Young Boozer (R)	John McMillan (R)	26R, 8D, 1I	72R, 33D	Doug Jones (D) (Note: Winner of the special election to fill the remainder of Jeff Sessions's term)	Richard Shelby (R)	6R, 1D	Trump/ Pence (R) ✓
2019	Kay Ivey (R)	Will Ainsworth (R)	John Merrill (R)	Steve Marshall (R)	Jim Zeigler (R)	John McMillan (R)	Rick Pate (R)	27R, 8D	77R, 28D	Doug Jones (D)	Richard Shelby (R)	6R, 1D	Trump/ Pence (R) ✓
2020	Kay Ivey (R)	Will Ainsworth (R)	John Merrill (R)	Steve Marshall (R)	Jim Zeigler (R)	John McMillan (R)	Rick Pate (R)	27R, 8D	77R, 28D	Doug Jones (D)	Richard Shelby (R)	6R, 1D	Trump/ Pence (R) ✗
2021	Kay Ivey (R)	Will Ainsworth (R)	John Merrill (R)	Steve Marshall (R)	Jim Zeigler (R)	John McMillan (R)	Rick Pate (R)	27R, 8D	77R, 28D	Tommy Tuberville (R)	Richard Shelby (R)	6R, 1D	Trump/ Pence (R) ✗
2022	Kay Ivey (R)	Will Ainsworth (R)	John Merrill (R)	Steve Marshall (R)	Jim Zeigler (R)	Young Boozer (R)	Rick Pate (R)	27R, 8D	77R, 28D	Tommy Tuberville (R)	Richard Shelby (R)	6R, 1D	Trump/ Pence (R) ✗
2023	Kay Ivey (R)	Will Ainsworth (R)	Wes Allen (R)	Steve Marshall (R)	Andrew Sorrell (R)	Young Boozer (R)	Rick Pate (R)	27R, 8D	77R, 28D	Tommy Tuberville (R)	Katie Britt (R)	6R, 1D	Trump/ Pence (R) ✗
2024	Kay Ivey (R)	Will Ainsworth (R)	Wes Allen (R)	Steve Marshall (R)	Andrew Sorrell (R)	Young Boozer (R)	Rick Pate (R)	27R, 8D	76R, 29D (Note: Republican Rep. David Cole resigned and was succeeded by Democratic Rep. Marilyn Lands following a special election, flipping the seat from Republican to Democratic.)	Tommy Tuberville (R)	Katie Britt (R)	6R, 1D	Trump/ Vance (R) ✓
2025	Kay Ivey (R)	Will Ainsworth (R)	Wes Allen (R)	Steve Marshall (R)	Andrew Sorrell (R)	Young Boozer (R)	Rick Pate (R)	27R, 8D	76R, 29D	Tommy Tuberville (R)	Katie Britt (R)	5R, 2D	Trump/ Vance (R) ✓
2026	Kay Ivey (R)	Will Ainsworth (R)	Wes Allen (R)	Steve Marshall (R)	Andrew Sorrell (R)	Young Boozer (R)	Rick Pate (R)	27R, 8D	76R, 29D	Tommy Tuberville (R)	Katie Britt (R)	5R, 2D	Trump/ Vance (R) ✓
2027	Tommy Tuberville (R)	John Wahl (R)	Caroleene Dobson (R)	Katherine Robertson (R)	Andrew Sorrell (R)	Young Boozer (R)	Corey Hill (R)	24R, 10D, 1I	74R, 31D	Barry Moore (R)	Katie Britt (R)	5R, 2D	Trump/ Vance (R) ✓

Key to party colors and abbreviations for members of the U.S. Congress and other politicians or officials
Alaskan Independence (AKIP) Know Nothing (KN) American Labor (AL) Anti-Jacksonian (Anti-J); National Republican (NR) Anti-Administration (AA) Anti-Masonic (Anti-M) Conservative (Con) Covenant (Cov)	Democratic (D) Democratic–Farmer–Labor (DFL) Democratic–NPL (D-NPL) Dixiecrat (Dix), States' Rights (SR) Democratic-Republican (DR) Farmer–Labor (FL) Federalist (F); Pro-Administration (PA)	Free Soil (FS) Fusion (Fus) Greenback (GB) Independence (IPM) Jacksonian (J) Liberal (Lib) Libertarian (L) National Union (NU)	Nonpartisan League (NPL) Nullifier (N) Opposition Northern (O); Opposition Southern (O) Populist (Pop) Progressive (Prog) Prohibition (Proh) Readjuster (Rea)	Republican (R) Silver (Sv) Silver Republican (SvR) Socialist (Soc) Union (U) Unconditional Union (UU) Vermont Progressive (VP) Whig (W)	Independent (I) Nonpartisan (NP)
