= 1966 Alabama State Treasurer election =

1966 Alabama state election

- November 8, 1966
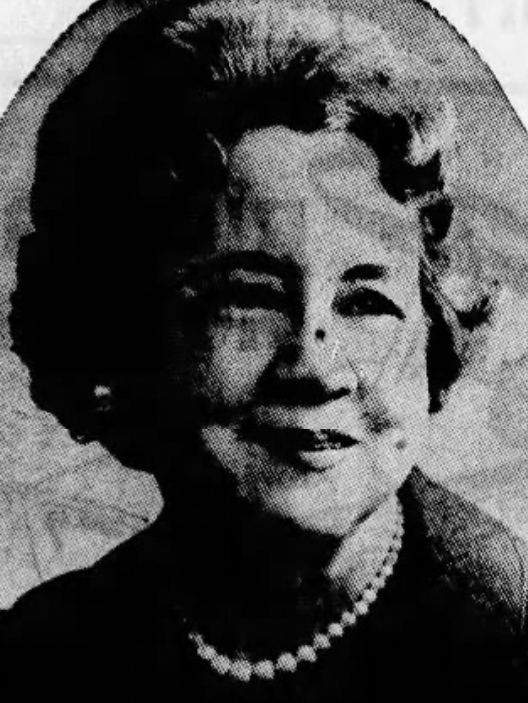

| Candidate | Agnes Baggett | Jack Callaway |
| Party | Democratic | Republican |
| Popular vote | 559,884 | 201,078 |
| Percentage | 73.6% | 26.4% |
State Treasurer before election
Bettye Frink
Democratic
Elected State Treasurer
Agnes Baggett
Democratic

The 1966 Alabama State Treasurer election was held on November 8, 1966, to elect the Alabama State Treasurer to a four-year term. The primary election was held on May 3, 1966, and the primary runoff was held on May 31, 1966.

== Democratic primary ==
=== Candidates ===
==== Nominee ====
- Agnes Baggett, incumbent Secretary of State of Alabama

==== Eliminated in runoff ====
- Bettye Frink, incumbent State Treasurer

==== Eliminated in primary ====
- Wyatt (Ruth Johnson) Owens, businesswoman

=== Results ===
Democratic primary
| Party | Candidate | Votes | % |
|---|---|---|---|
| Democratic | Bettye Frink | 332,459 | 46.89 |
| Democratic | Mrs. Agnes Baggett | 281,027 | 39.64 |
| Democratic | Mrs. Wyatt (Ruth Johnson) Owens | 95,519 | 13.47 |
| Total votes | | 709,005 | 100.00 |

=== Runoff ===
==== Results ====
Democratic primary runoff
| Party | Candidate | Votes | % |
|---|---|---|---|
| Democratic | Mrs. Agnes Baggett | 276,866 | 53.93 |
| Democratic | Bettye Frink | 236,547 | 46.07 |
| Total votes | | 513,413 | 100.00 |

== Republican Party ==
=== Nominee ===
- Jack Callaway, businessman

== General election ==
=== Results ===
1966 Alabama State Treasurer election
| Party | Candidate | Votes | % |
|---|---|---|---|
| Democratic | Mrs. Agnes Baggett | 559,884 | 73.58 |
| Republican | Jack Callaway | 201,078 | 26.42 |
| Total votes | | 760,962 | 100.00 |
