= 1946 Alabama State Treasurer election =

- November 5, 1946
Candidate	John Brandon	I. R. Ensey
Party	Democratic	Republican
Popular vote	164,318	22,358
Percentage	88.0%	12.0%
State Treasurer before election
Walter Lusk
Democratic
Elected State Treasurer
John Brandon
Democratic

The 1946 Alabama State Treasurer election was held on November 5, 1946, to elect the State Treasurer of Alabama to a four-year term. The primary election was held on May 7, 1946.

== Democratic primary ==
=== Candidates ===
==== Nominee ====
- John Brandon, former State Auditor of Alabama

==== Eliminated in primary ====
- Thomas H. Maxwell, member of the State Democratic Executive Committee and perennial candidate for Alabama's 6th congressional district

=== Results ===
Democratic primary
Party	Candidate	Votes	%
Democratic	John Brandon	168,641	65.71
Democratic	T. H. Maxwell	87,993	34.29
Total votes		256,634	100.00

== Republican convention ==
=== Candidates ===
==== Nominee ====
- I. R. Ensey

== General election ==
=== Results ===
1946 Alabama State Treasurer election
Party	Candidate	Votes	%
Democratic	John Brandon	164,318	88.02
Republican	I. R. Ensey	22,358	11.98
Total votes		186,676	100.00
