= 2018 Alabama State Auditor election =

- November 6, 2018
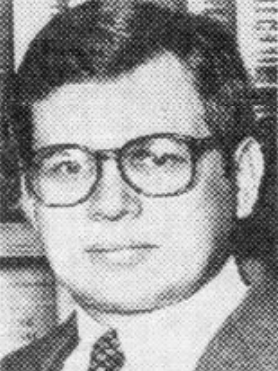

Nominee	Jim Zeigler	Miranda Joseph
Party	Republican	Democratic
Popular vote	1,018,466	665,679
Percentage	60.42%	39.49%
- County results Zeigler: 50–60% 60–70% 70–80% 80–90% Joseph: 50–60% 60–70% 70–80% 80–90%
Auditor before election
Jim Zeigler
Republican
Elected Auditor
Jim Zeigler
Republican

The 2018 Alabama State Auditor election took place on November 6, 2018, to elect the state auditor of Alabama. Incumbent Republican State Auditor Jim Zeigler was re-elected to a second term in office, defeating Democratic challenger Miranda Joseph in a landslide.

Primary elections were held on June 5.

== Republican primary ==
=== Candidates ===
==== Nominee ====
- Jim Zeigler, incumbent state auditor (2015–2023)

==== Eliminated in primary ====
- Stan Cooke, pastor
- Elliott Lipinsky, Wilcox County deputy district attorney

==== Results ====
Results by county Zeigler: 40–50%; 50–60%; 60–70%; 70–80%; Cooke: 40–50%

Republican primary results
Party	Candidate	Votes	%
Republican	Jim Zeigler (incumbent)	262,153	55.62%
Republican	Stan Cooke	153,578	32.58%
Republican	Elliott Lipinski	55,624	11.80%
Total votes		471,355	100.00%

== Democratic primary ==
=== Candidates ===
==== Nominee ====
- Miranda Joseph, private auditor

== General election ==
=== Results ===
2018 Alabama State Auditor election
Party	Candidate	Votes	%	±%
Republican	Jim Zeigler (incumbent)	1,018,466	60.42%	–2.51%
Democratic	Miranda Joseph	665,679	39.49%	+2.51%
Write-in		1,362	0.08%	–0.01%
Total votes		1,685,507	100.00%	N/A

==== By county ====
County	Jim Zeigler Republican		Miranda Joseph Democratic		Write-in Various		Margin		Total
County	#	%	#	%	#	%	#	%	Total
Autauga	13,640	70.15%	5,787	29.76%	18	0.09%	7,853	40.39%	19,445
Baldwin	57,404	74.70%	19,385	25.22%	61	0.08%	38,019	49.47%	76,850
Barbour	4,126	50.32%	4,068	49.62%	5	0.06%	58	0.71%	8,199
Bibb	5,211	76.39%	1,608	23.57%	3	0.04%	3,603	52.81%	6,822
Blount	17,067	88.56%	2,196	11.40%	8	0.04%	14,871	77.17%	19,271
Bullock	871	24.08%	2,744	75.86%	2	0.06%	-1,873	-51.78%	3,617
Butler	4,423	56.50%	3,399	43.42%	7	0.09%	1,024	13.08%	7,829
Calhoun	24,480	67.28%	11,872	32.63%	31	0.09%	12,608	34.65%	36,383
Chambers	6,383	57.68%	4,678	42.27%	6	0.05%	1,705	15.41%	11,067
Cherokee	6,820	82.48%	1,446	17.49%	3	0.04%	5,374	64.99%	8,269
Chilton	11,156	82.46%	2,362	17.46%	11	0.08%	8,794	65.00%	13,529
Choctaw	3,145	54.17%	2,656	45.75%	5	0.09%	489	8.42%	5,806
Clarke	6,161	56.29%	4,781	43.68%	3	0.03%	1,380	12.61%	10,945
Clay	4,166	79.64%	1,062	20.30%	3	0.06%	3,104	59.34%	5,231
Cleburne	3,883	89.39%	458	10.54%	3	0.07%	3,425	78.84%	4,344
Coffee	11,911	75.31%	3,895	24.63%	9	0.06%	8,016	50.69%	15,815
Colbert	12,612	62.83%	7,443	37.08%	19	0.09%	5,169	25.75%	20,074
Conecuh	2,369	49.33%	2,430	50.60%	3	0.06%	-61	-1.27%	4,802
Coosa	2,764	65.31%	1,466	34.64%	2	0.05%	1,298	30.67%	4,232
Covington	9,738	82.16%	2,108	17.79%	6	0.05%	7,630	64.38%	11,852
Crenshaw	3,714	71.24%	1,496	28.70%	3	0.06%	2,218	42.55%	5,213
Cullman	24,541	86.63%	3,772	13.32%	14	0.05%	20,769	73.32%	28,327
Dale	10,238	72.54%	3,868	27.41%	8	0.06%	6,370	45.13%	14,114
Dallas	4,607	31.04%	10,213	68.82%	20	0.13%	-5,606	-37.78%	14,840
DeKalb	16,842	81.34%	3,851	18.60%	13	0.06%	12,991	62.74%	20,706
Elmore	21,344	73.27%	7,765	26.65%	23	0.08%	13,579	46.61%	29,132
Escambia	7,934	67.13%	3,879	32.82%	5	0.04%	4,055	34.31%	11,818
Etowah	24,102	71.24%	9,700	28.67%	28	0.08%	14,402	42.57%	33,830
Fayette	5,512	77.49%	1,591	22.37%	10	0.14%	3,921	55.12%	7,113
Franklin	6,131	74.41%	2,104	25.53%	5	0.06%	4,027	48.87%	8,240
Geneva	7,643	86.25%	1,215	13.71%	3	0.03%	6,428	72.54%	8,861
Greene	649	15.87%	3,441	84.13%	0	0.00%	-2,792	-68.26%	4,090
Hale	2,384	37.62%	3,952	62.36%	1	0.02%	-1,568	-24.74%	6,337
Henry	4,535	69.66%	1,971	30.28%	4	0.06%	2,564	39.39%	6,510
Houston	22,695	71.31%	9,111	28.63%	21	0.07%	13,584	42.68%	31,827
Jackson	11,915	78.40%	3,278	21.57%	5	0.03%	8,637	56.83%	15,198
Jefferson	109,160	43.08%	143,949	56.81%	273	0.11%	-34,789	-13.73%	253,382
Lamar	4,421	83.78%	854	16.18%	2	0.04%	3,567	67.60%	5,277
Lauderdale	20,186	66.96%	9,946	32.99%	15	0.05%	10,240	33.97%	30,147
Lawrence	7,963	69.41%	3,506	30.56%	3	0.03%	4,457	38.85%	11,472
Lee	28,326	58.36%	20,177	41.57%	37	0.08%	8,149	16.79%	48,540
Limestone	22,853	69.43%	10,050	30.53%	13	0.04%	12,803	38.90%	32,916
Lowndes	1,355	27.66%	3,541	72.29%	2	0.04%	-2,186	-44.63%	4,898
Macon	1,173	16.41%	5,970	83.54%	3	0.04%	-4,797	-67.13%	7,146
Madison	74,893	53.99%	63,704	45.92%	121	0.09%	11,189	8.07%	138,718
Marengo	4,003	46.36%	4,625	53.56%	7	0.08%	-622	-7.20%	8,635
Marion	8,096	85.08%	1,412	14.84%	8	0.08%	6,684	70.24%	9,516
Marshall	22,009	82.51%	4,654	17.45%	12	0.04%	17,355	65.06%	26,675
Mobile	69,593	52.99%	61,585	46.90%	143	0.11%	8,008	6.10%	131,321
Monroe	4,794	55.18%	3,888	44.75%	6	0.07%	906	10.43%	8,688
Montgomery	26,194	34.54%	49,553	65.35%	84	0.11%	-23,359	-30.80%	75,831
Morgan	28,454	73.22%	10,386	26.73%	19	0.05%	18,068	46.50%	38,859
Perry	1,042	24.88%	3,146	75.12%	0	0.00%	-2,104	-50.24%	4,188
Pickens	4,664	57.42%	3,455	42.53%	4	0.05%	1,209	14.88%	8,123
Pike	5,894	57.84%	4,292	42.12%	4	0.04%	1,602	15.72%	10,190
Randolph	5,697	76.32%	1,766	23.66%	2	0.03%	3,931	52.66%	7,465
Russell	6,778	45.59%	8,079	54.35%	9	0.06%	-1,301	-8.75%	14,866
Shelby	58,283	70.39%	24,434	29.51%	80	0.10%	33,849	40.88%	82,797
St. Clair	23,959	80.77%	5,688	19.17%	17	0.06%	18,271	61.59%	29,664
Sumter	1,236	23.40%	4,043	76.56%	2	0.04%	-2,807	-53.15%	5,281
Talladega	15,777	60.59%	10,245	39.34%	18	0.07%	5,532	21.24%	26,040
Tallapoosa	10,805	69.85%	4,658	30.11%	6	0.04%	6,147	39.74%	15,469
Tuscaloosa	36,993	54.80%	30,450	45.10%	68	0.10%	6,543	9.69%	67,511
Walker	18,062	80.19%	4,442	19.72%	21	0.09%	13,620	60.47%	22,525
Washington	4,599	69.43%	2,019	30.48%	6	0.09%	2,580	38.95%	6,624
Wilcox	1,411	30.58%	3,201	69.38%	2	0.04%	-1,790	-38.79%	4,614
Winston	6,677	87.96%	910	11.99%	4	0.05%	5,767	75.97%	7,591
Totals	1,018,466	60.42%	665,679	39.49%	1,362	0.08%	352,787	20.93%	1,685,507

Counties that flipped from Democratic to Republican

- Barbour (largest city: Eufaula)
