= 1986 Alabama State Auditor election =

- November 4, 1986
Candidate	Jan Cook
Party	Democratic
Popular vote	713,653
Percentage	100.0%
- County results Cook: 90-100%
State Auditor before election
Jan Cook
Democratic
Elected State Auditor
Jan Cook
Democratic

The 1986 Alabama State Auditor election was held on November 4, 1986, to elect the State Auditor of Alabama to a four-year term. Incumbent auditor Jan Cook was re-elected to a second term.

== Democratic primary ==
=== Candidates ===
==== Nominee ====
- Jan Cook, incumbent auditor

==== Eliminated in primary ====
- Richard L. "Dick" Ahlgren
- Sonja Stacey

=== Results ===
Democratic primary
Party	Candidate	Votes	%
Democratic	Jan Cook	539,786	73.86
Democratic	Richard L. "Dick" Ahlgren	112,848	15.44
Democratic	Sonja Stacey	78,225	10.70
Total votes		730,859	100.00

== General election ==
=== Results ===
1986 Alabama State Auditor election
Party	Candidate	Votes	%
Democratic	Jan Cook	713,653	100.00
Total votes		713,653	100.00
