= 1946 Alabama Secretary of State election =

- November 5, 1946
Candidate	Sibyl Pool	Cyrus Kitchens
Party	Democratic	Republican
Popular vote	164,849	22,739
Percentage	88.9%	12.1%
Secretary of State before election
Sibyl Pool
Democratic
Elected Secretary of State
Sibyl Pool
Democratic

The 1946 Alabama Secretary of State election was held on November 5, 1946, to elect the Secretary of State of Alabama to a four-year term. The primary election was held on May 7, 1946.

== Democratic primary ==
=== Candidates ===
==== Nominee ====
- Sibyl Pool, incumbent secretary of state

==== Eliminated in primary ====
- Ben A. Hudson, former coach and teacher

=== Results ===
Democratic primary
Party	Candidate	Votes	%
Democratic	Sibyl Pool	170,658	60.53
Democratic	Ben A. Hudson	111,288	39.47
Total votes		281,946	100.00

== Republican convention ==
=== Candidates ===
==== Nominee ====
- Cyrus Kitchens, reverend

== General election ==
=== Results ===
1946 Alabama Secretary of State election
Party	Candidate	Votes	%
Democratic	Sibyl Pool	164,849	87.88
Republican	Cyrus Kitchens	22,739	12.12
Total votes		187,588	100.00
