= Sidney Herbert Blan =

American politician

25th Alabama State Treasurer
- In office 1931–1935
- Governor: Benjamin M. Miller
- Preceded by: William Allgood
- Succeeded by: Charles McCall

State Auditor of Alabama
- In office 1927–1931
- Governor: Bibb Graves
- Preceded by: William B. Allgood
- Succeeded by: John M. Brandon

31st Secretary of State of Alabama
- In office 1923–1927
- Governor: William W. Brandon
- Preceded by: William Peyton Cobb
- Succeeded by: John Marvin Brandon

Personal details
- Born: March 26, 1877 Troy, Alabama, US
- Died: April 20, 1963 (aged 86) Montgomery, Alabama, US
- Party: Democratic
- Spouse: Ethel Barr (m. 1901)

Sidney Herbert Blan (March 26, 1877 – April 20, 1963) was a politician from Alabama. He served as Secretary of State of Alabama from 1923 to 1927, State Auditor of Alabama from 1927 to 1931, and Alabama State Treasurer from 1931 to 1935.

Before being elected for public office, Blan served as a Presidential Elector in the 1916 and 1920 Presidential Elections.

== Biography ==
Sidney Herbert Blan was born in Troy, Alabama on March 26, 1877.

He married Ethel Barr on June 21, 1901, and had two children. He died in Montgomery on April 20, 1963.
