= 1960 Alabama Democratic presidential primary =

- May 3, 1960; May 31, 1960 (runoff)

58 Democratic National Convention delegates (56 pledged, 2 unpledged)

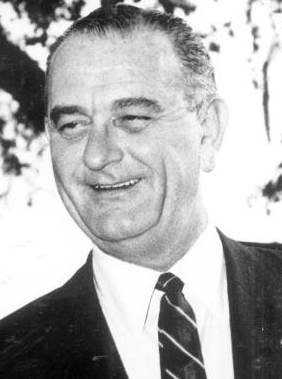

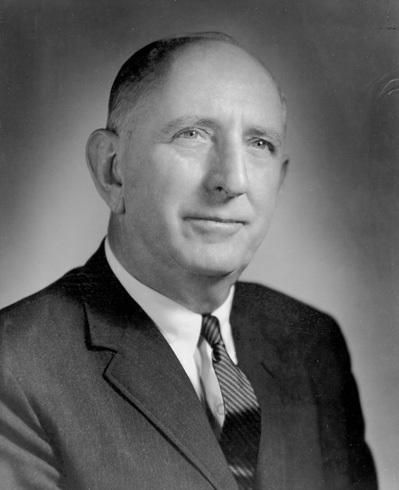

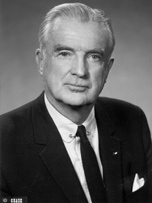
Candidate	Uncommitted	Lyndon B. Johnson
Home state	—	Texas
Delegate count	22	21
First round (at-large)	142,762; 73.93%	84,237; 43.62%
Runoff (at-large)	105,036; 58.25%	111,866; 62.03%
Candidate	Richard Russell Jr.	Stuart Symington
Home state	Georgia	Missouri
Delegate count	10	3
First round (at-large)	107,747; 55.79%	61,735; 31.97%
Runoff (at-large)	97,298; 53.95%	No candidate
- Allegiance of highest-voted delegate candidate in the at-large runoff by county Johnson Uncommitted Russell Jr. Stevenson II

A presidential primary was held in the U.S. state of Alabama on May 3, 1960, with runoff elections on May 31, to elect delegates representing Alabama to the 1960 Democratic National Convention. Fifty-six delegates were to be elected, four from each of the state's nine congressional districts, with twenty at-large delegates to be elected. The fifty-six delegates were worth 29 votes: district and at-large delegates received a half vote each, with national committee members having a full vote. On June 3, 1960, days after the runoff, the Associated Press determined that of the fifty-six elected delegates, twenty-one would go to Lyndon B. Johnson, ten to Richard Russell Jr., and three to Stuart Symington. At the convention roll call, forty Alabama delegates voted for Johnson (worth 20 votes), seven each for Kennedy and Symington (3½ votes each), and four for four other candidates (½ vote each).

== At-large delegates ==
=== First round ===
First round results (at-large, 20 to be elected)
Pledge	Delegate	Votes	%
Uncommitted	MacDonald Gallion	142,762	73.93%
Uncommitted	William G. Hardwick	136,424	70.64%
Uncommitted	J. C. Henderson	118,271	61.24%
Uncommitted	T. C. "Cliff" Almon	115,718	59.92%
Uncommitted	Dorothy S. Carmichael	114,591	59.34%
Uncommitted	Fred H. Davis	108,248	56.05%
Russell Jr.	Frank E. Dixon	107,747	55.79%
Uncommitted	John F. Britton	106,644	55.22%
Uncommitted	Bettye Frink	106,631	55.22%
Uncommitted	Joe Elliott	97,967	50.73%
Uncommitted	James C. Inzer Jr. →	93,722	48.53%
Uncommitted	Ralph Smith →	92,489	47.89%
Uncommitted	Robert H. King →	91,761	47.52%
Russell Jr.	James E. Simpson →	91,179	47.21%
Johnson	J. H. Kelly →	84,237	43.62%
Uncommitted	H. Coleman Long →	83,770	43.38%
Russell Jr.	Raymond Weeks →	83,746	43.37%
Uncommitted	Neil Metcalf →	80,654	41.76%
Uncommitted	Sonny Hornsby →	79,005	40.91%
Russell Jr.	Sim A. Thomas →	75,994	39.35%
Uncommitted	Ed Beasley →	75,365	39.03%
Russell Jr.	Charles F. Belew →	72,094	37.33%
Uncommitted	William J. O'Neal →	70,282	36.39%
Uncommitted	Benjamin Grady Wilson →	69,764	36.13%
Johnson	Lewis W. Fowler →	69,592	36.04%
Russell Jr.	F. L. "Hello" Ferrell →	68,623	35.53%
Uncommitted	O. S. (Tigger) Burke →	67,211	34.80%
Uncommitted	Gary F. Burns →	66,314	34.34%
Russell Jr.	Edwin H. "Ed" Estes →	66,190	34.27%
Uncommitted	S. Ty Russell →	65,439	33.89%
Kennedy	Newt Rains	65,254	33.79%
Uncommitted	Billy Walker	62,880	32.56%
Uncommitted	M. J. Williams Jr.	62,199	32.21%
Symington	Bowling G. Bufford	61,735	31.97%
Johnson	Horace R. Batchelor	57,228	29.63%
Russell Jr.	Frank P. Walls	56,161	29.08%
Kennedy	Wallace Powell Pruitt Jr.	55,188	28.58%
Uncommitted	Bob P. Schwenn	54,740	28.35%
Uncommitted	Charles Reynolds	54,007	27.97%
Uncommitted	Ralph "Shorty" Price	53,797	27.86%
Stevenson II	L. R. Johnston	52,559	27.22%
Uncommitted	George J. Rivers	52,545	27.21%
Uncommitted	Dick F. DeVan	52,277	27.07%
Uncommitted	Waymon E. Benson	50,834	26.32%
Johnson	F. Jerry Cook	50,576	26.19%
Uncommitted	F. Raymond Ingram	49,983	25.88%
Johnson	Stephen Radford Batson	48,263	24.99%
Uncommitted	John T. Nichols	46,878	24.27%
Uncommitted	Chas. H. Adderhold	46,335	23.99%
Kennedy	Tom Hickman	45,966	23.80%
Uncommitted	Glynn N. C. Jones Sr.	41,886	21.69%
Uncommitted	Lee Rigsby	38,605	19.99%
Total		3,862,330	100.00%

=== Runoff round ===
Runoff results (at-large, 10 to be elected)
Pledge	Delegate	Votes	%
Johnson	James C. Inzer Jr.	111,866	62.03%
Uncommitted	Ralph Smith	105,036	58.25%
Johnson	Robert H. King	99,555	55.21%
Russell Jr.	Ed Beasley	97,298	53.95%
Johnson	Jack H. Kelly	96,991	53.78%
Russell Jr.	Raymond Weeks	96,671	53.61%
Uncommitted	James E. Simpson	96,495	53.51%
Uncommitted	William J. O'Neal	94,782	52.56%
Uncommitted	Sonny Hornsby	93,010	51.58%
Uncommitted	H. Coleman Long	91,267	50.61%
Stevenson II	Ed H. Estes	89,159	49.44%
Johnson	Lewis W. Fowler	88,356	49.00%
Uncommitted	Neil Metcalf	88,031	48.82%
Russell Jr.	Sim A. Thomas	85,912	47.64%
Russell Jr.	Charles F. Belew	84,182	46.68%
Johnson	Gary F. Burns	80,853	44.84%
Johnson	F. L. "Hello" Ferrell	80,732	44.77%
Johnson	Benjamin Grady Wilson	76,048	42.17%
Uncommitted	S. Ty Russell	73,908	40.98%
Uncommitted	O. S. "Tigger" Burke	73,173	40.58%
Total		1,803,325	100.00%

== See also ==
- 1960 Democratic Party presidential primaries
- 1960 United States presidential election
- 1960 United States presidential election in Alabama
- 1960 United States elections
