= John Marvin Brandon =

American politician (1888–1960)

28th & 30th Alabama State Treasurer
- In office 1955–1959
- Governor: Jim Folsom
- Preceded by: Sibyl Pool
- Succeeded by: Agnes Baggett
- In office 1947–1951
- Governor: Jim Folsom
- Preceded by: Walter Lusk
- Succeeded by: Sibyl Pool

State Auditor of Alabama
- In office 1951–1955
- Governor: Gordon Persons
- Preceded by: Daniel H. Thomas, Sr.
- Succeeded by: Agnes Baggett
- In office 1943–1947
- Governor: Chauncey Sparks
- Preceded by: David H. Turner
- Succeeded by: Daniel H. Thomas, Sr.
- In office 1931–1935
- Governor: Benjamin M. Miller
- Preceded by: Sidney H. Blan
- Succeeded by: Charles E. McCall

32nd & 35th Secretary of State of Alabama
- In office 1939–1943
- Governor: Jim Folsom
- Preceded by: David Howell Turner
- Succeeded by: David Howell Turner
- In office 1927–1931
- Governor: Bibb Graves
- Preceded by: Sidney Herbert Blan
- Succeeded by: Pete Jarman

Personal details
- Born: May 8, 1888 Tuscaloosa, Alabama, U.S.
- Died: September 16, 1960 (aged 72)
- Party: Democratic
- Spouse: George Lamar Baggett (m. 1926; died 1949)

John Marvin Brandon (May 8, 1888 – September 16, 1960) was a politician from Alabama. He served as State Auditor of Alabama from 1931 to 1935, 1943 to 1947 and 1951 to 1955. He also served as Alabama State Treasurer from 1947 to 1951 and 1955 to 1959 and served as Secretary of State of Alabama from 1927 to 1931 and 1939 to 1943.

Brandon began his business career in the State Auditor's office in Montgomery, July 1908 and in January 1923, he was appointed Secretary of the Alabama Public Service Commission.

He married in June 1915 and had one child. He died on September 16, 1960.
