= John Purifoy =

American politician

29th Secretary of State of Alabama
- In office 1915–1919
- Governor: Charles Henderson
- Preceded by: Cyrus B. Brown
- Succeeded by: William Peyton Cobb

20th Alabama State Treasurer
- In office 1911–1915
- Governor: Emmet O'Neal
- Preceded by: Walter D. Seed Sr.
- Succeeded by: William Lancaster

State Auditor of Alabama
- In office 1892–1896
- Governor: Thomas G. Jones; William C. Oates
- Preceded by: Cyrus D. Hogue
- Succeeded by: Walter S. White

Personal details
- Born: March 21, 1842
- Died: July 17, 1927 (aged 85)
- Party: Democratic

John Purifoy (March 21, 1842 – July 17, 1927) was a politician from Alabama. He served as secretary of state of Alabama from 1915 to 1919, Alabama state treasurer 1911 to 1915 and state auditor of Alabama from 1892 to 1896.

He was born on March 21, 1842. He went to Tennessee University where he left in April 1861 to join the Confederate Army. Following the end of the Civil War, he was a schoolteacher for several years and engaged in farming. Purifoy was elected Probate Judge of Wilcox County, Alabama in 1880 and, ten years later, was elected to the Alabama House of Representatives.

In 1915, during his time as secretary of state of Alabama, the Alabama House of Representatives considered impeaching Purifoy over allegations that he paid an opponent in his 1914 election to withdraw from the Democratic Party primary election. The House, however, rejected impeachment.

His son James L. Purifoy died in 1939.

== Additional sources ==
- alabama.gov
