= David Howell Turner =

Alabama politician

34th & 36th Secretary of State of Alabama
- In office 1943–1944
- Governor: Chauncey Sparks
- Preceded by: John Marvin Brandon
- Succeeded by: Sibyl Pool
- In office 1935–1939
- Governor: Bibb Graves
- Preceded by: Pete Jarman
- Succeeded by: John Marvin Brandon

State Auditor of Alabama
- In office 1939–1943
- Governor: Frank M. Dixon
- Preceded by: Charles E. McCall
- Succeeded by: John M. Brandon

Personal details
- Born: May 10, 1885
- Died: May 11, 1957 (aged 72)
- Political party: Democratic

David Howell Turner (May 10, 1885 – May 11, 1957) was a politician from Alabama. He was Secretary of State of Alabama from 1935 to 1939 and 1943 to 1944. He also served as State Auditor of Alabama from 1939 to 1943.

He was born on May 10, 1885, in Camden, AL. He attended the University of Alabama. In 1944, he resigned as Secretary of State to accept an appointment as chairman of the Board of Pardons and Paroles.

He married on December 18, 1913, and had three children. He died on May 11, 1957.
