= Pete Jarman =

American politician (1892–1955)

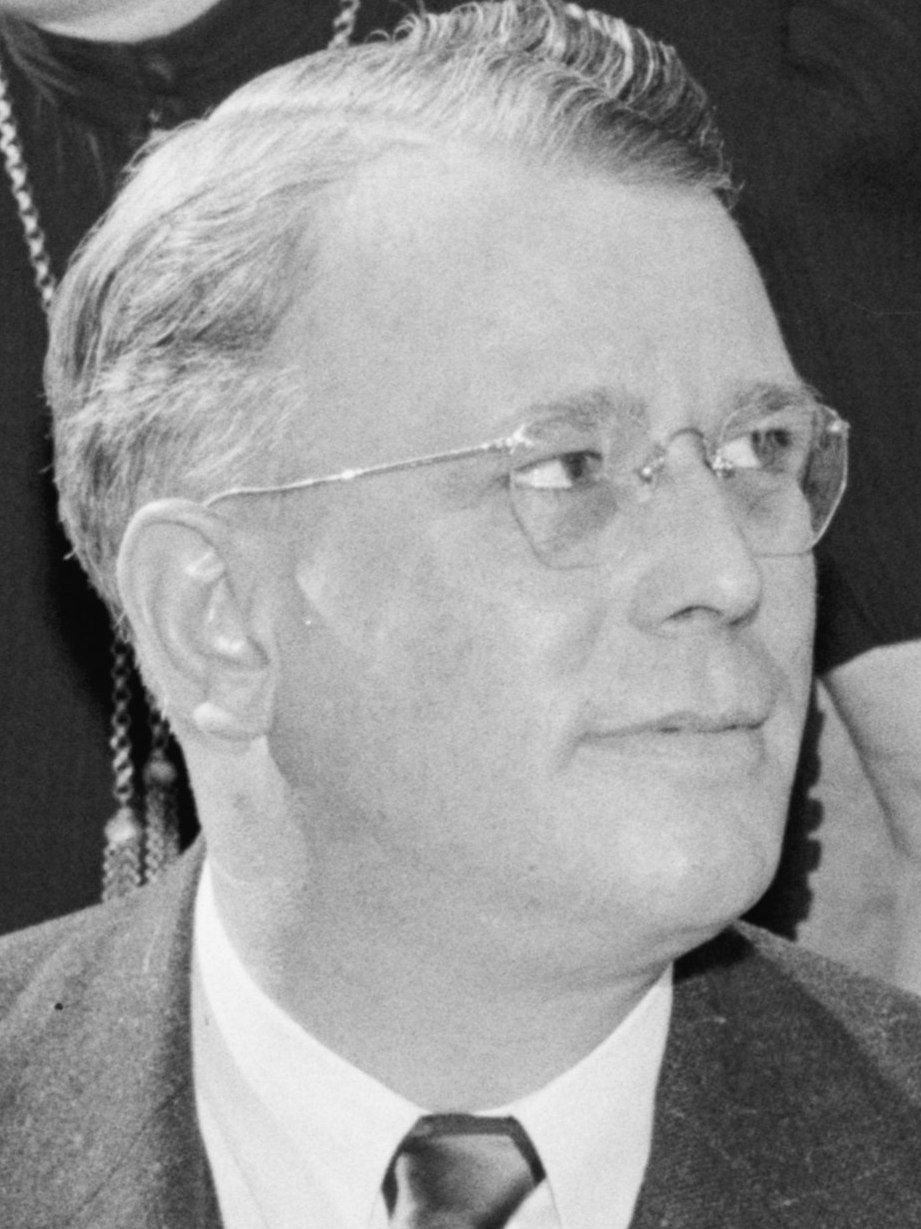
- Pete Jarman (1939)

Member of the U.S. House of Representatives from Alabama's 6th district
- In office January 3, 1937 – January 3, 1949
- Preceded by: William B. Oliver
- Succeeded by: Edward deGraffenried

5th United States Ambassador to Australia
- In office June 8, 1949 – July 31, 1953
- President: Harry S. Truman
- Preceded by: Myron M. Cowen
- Succeeded by: Amos J. Peaslee

33rd Secretary of State of Alabama
- In office 1931–1935
- Governor: Benjamin M. Miller
- Preceded by: John Marvin Brandon
- Succeeded by: David Howell Turner

Personal details
- Born: Peterson Bryant Jarman; October 31, 1892 Greensboro, Alabama, U.S.
- Died: February 17, 1955 (aged 62) Washington, D.C., U.S.
- Resting place: Arlington National Cemetery
- Party: Democratic
- Education: University of Alabama

Military service
- Allegiance: United States
- Branch/service: United States Army; Alabama National Guard
- Rank: Lieutenant colonel
- Unit: 327th Infantry Regiment; 31st Infantry Division
- Battles/wars: World War I

Peterson Bryant ″Pete″ Jarman (October 31, 1892 – February 17, 1955) was a U.S. representative from Alabama.

== Early life ==
Born in Greensboro, Alabama, Jarman attended the public schools, the Normal College, Livingston, Alabama, and Southern University, Greensboro, Alabama. He graduated from the University of Alabama in 1913, and attended the university of Montpellier, France, in 1919, after which he served as clerk in probate office in Sumter County, Alabama, from 1913 to 1917.

== Military career ==
During the First World War, Jarman served overseas as second and first lieutenant in the 327th Infantry Regiment. He served in the Alabama National Guard as inspector general with rank of major in 1922–1924, and as division inspector of the 31st Infantry Division with rank of lieutenant colonel in 1924–1940.

== Political career ==
Jarman served as assistant State examiner of accounts in 1919–1930, and as Secretary of State of Alabama in 1931–1934. He served as assistant State comptroller in 1935 and 1936. He was a member of the State Democratic executive committee of Alabama in 1927–1930.

Jarman was elected as a Democrat to the Seventy-fifth and to the five succeeding Congresses (January 3, 1937 – January 3, 1949). He served as chairman of the Committee on Memorials (Seventy-fifth Congress). He was an unsuccessful candidate for renomination in 1948.

A confidential 1943 analysis of the House Foreign Affairs Committee by Isaiah Berlin for the British Foreign Office described Jarman as

A big, good-natured Rotarian type of man who has always supported the Administration's foreign policies to the full. Is reputedly pro-British and is likely to back any international post-war attempts by the Administration, although he is no out-and-out New Dealer.

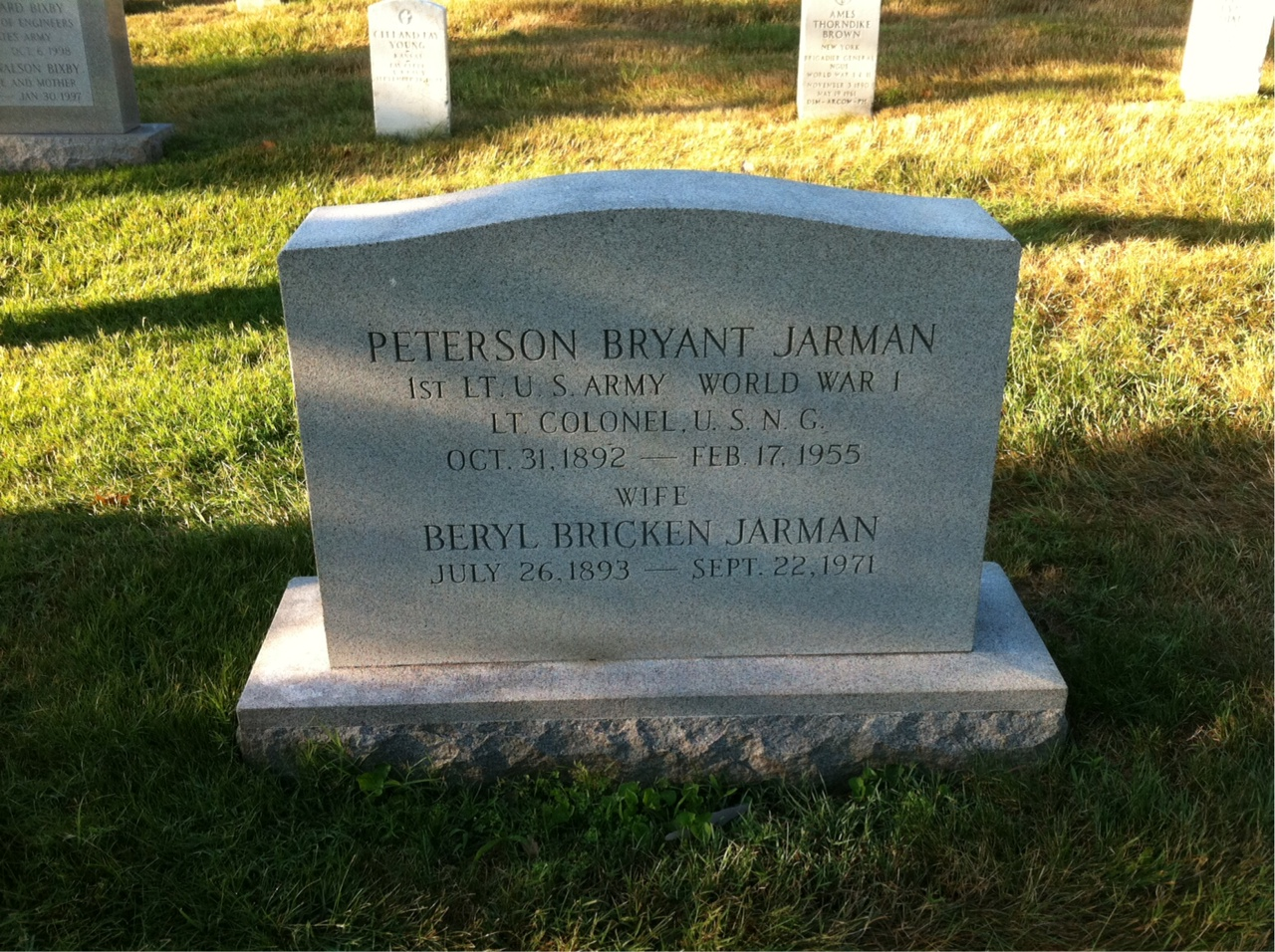
Grave of Jarman at Arlington National Cemetery

He was appointed by President Harry S. Truman as Ambassador to Australia on June 8, 1949, and served until July 31, 1953. He died in Washington, D.C., on February 17, 1955, and was interred in Arlington National Cemetery.

Political offices
Preceded by John Marvin Brandon	Secretary of State of Alabama; 1931–1935	Succeeded by David Howell Turner
U.S. House of Representatives
Preceded by William B. Oliver	Member of the U.S. House of Representatives from Alabama's 6th congressional district 1937-1949	Succeeded by Edward deGraffenried
Diplomatic posts
Preceded by Myron M. Cowen	United States Ambassador to Australia; 1949–1953	Succeeded by Amos J. Peaslee
