= Mary Texas Hurt Garner =

American politician

32nd Alabama State Treasurer
- In office 1963–1967
- Governor: George Wallace
- Preceded by: Agnes Baggett
- Succeeded by: Agnes Baggett

State Auditor of Alabama
- In office 1959–1963
- Governor: John M. Patterson
- Preceded by: Agnes Baggett
- Succeeded by: Bettye Frink

39th Secretary of State of Alabama
- In office 1955–1959
- Governor: Jim Folsom
- Preceded by: Agnes Baggett
- Succeeded by: Bettye Frink

Personal details
- Born: October 3, 1928 Scottsboro, Alabama U.S.
- Died: July 1, 1997 (aged 68)
- Party: Democratic
- Spouse: William E. Garner (m. 1956)
- Children: 2

Mary Texas Hurt Garner (October 3, 1928 – July 1, 1997) was a politician from Alabama. She served as Alabama State Treasurer from 1963 to 1967, State Auditor of Alabama from 1959 to 1963 and Secretary of State of Alabama from 1955 to 1959.

She received a degree from George Washington University and was admitted to the Alabama Bar Association by examination and practiced law one year in Scottsboro before becoming a member of the state Attorney General's office. She resigned this position to become a candidate for the office of Secretary of State in 1954 and was elected State Auditor in 1958 and State Treasurer in 1962.

According to the Centreville Press (Centreville, AL): "Before entering law school, Miss Hurt was the Manager for the Bocanita Theatre in Scottsboro and at the age of 12 was credited with being the 'world's youngest theatre manager.'"

She married William E. Garner on November 3, 1956, and had two children. She died on July 1, 1997.

Party political offices
Preceded by Agnes Baggett	Democratic nominee for Alabama State Treasurer; 1962	Succeeded by Agnes Baggett
