= Annie Laurie Gunter =

American politician

35th Treasurer of Alabama
- In office June 13, 1978 – January 19, 1987
- Governor: George Wallace; Fob James
- Preceded by: Melba Till Allen
- Succeeded by: George Wallace Jr.

Personal details
- Born: June 23, 1919; North Carolina, US
- Died: July 9, 2005 (aged 86); Montgomery, Alabama, US
- Political party: Democratic

Annie Laurie Gunter (born Annie Laurie Cain; June 23, 1919 – July 9, 2005) was an American politician who served as the Treasurer of Alabama from 1978 to 1987.

She died of heart failure on July 9, 2005, in Montgomery, Alabama at age 86.

Party political offices
Preceded by Melba Till Allen	Democratic nominee for Alabama State Treasurer; 1978, 1982	Succeeded by George Wallace Jr.
