= Melba Till Allen =

American politician (1933–1989)

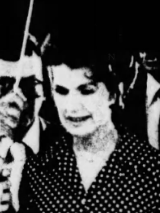
- Allen in 1978

34th Treasurer of Alabama
- In office January 21, 1975 – June 8, 1978
- Governor: George Wallace
- Preceded by: Agnes Baggett
- Succeeded by: Annie Laurie Gunter

Auditor of Alabama
- In office January 17, 1967 – January 21, 1975
- Governor: Lurleen Wallace; Albert Brewer; George Wallace
- Preceded by: Bettye Frink
- Succeeded by: Bettye Frink

Personal details
- Born: March 3, 1933 Butler County, Alabama
- Died: October 20, 1989 (aged 56) Montgomery, Alabama
- Party: Democratic

Melba Till Allen (March 3, 1933 – October 20, 1989) was an American politician who served as the Auditor of Alabama from 1967 to 1975 and as the Treasurer of Alabama from 1975 to 1978. In 1972, she challenged incumbent Senator John Sparkman in the Democratic primary; she earned 29.48% of the vote and nearly forced Sparkman into a run-off, but was defeated.

Allen was convicted in 1978 of using her office to obtain favorable bank loans for several personal businesses including a religious theme park. She failed to disclose these business ventures and a full disclosure of her personal finances. She was sentenced to six years in jail and three and a half years of probation.

She died of cancer on October 20, 1989, in Montgomery, Alabama at age 56.

Party political offices
Preceded by Bettye Frink	Democratic nominee for State Auditor of Alabama; 1966, 1970	Succeeded by Bettye Frink
Preceded by Agnes Baggett	Democratic nominee for Alabama State Treasurer; 1974	Succeeded by Annie Laurie Gunter
