= Samantha Shaw =

American politician

39th State Auditor of Alabama
- In office January 15, 2007 – January 19, 2015
- Governor: Bob Riley; Robert Bentley
- Preceded by: Beth Chapman
- Succeeded by: Jim Zeigler

Personal details
- Born: February 10, 1957 (age 69) Homewood, Alabama, U.S.
- Party: Republican
- Spouse: Greg Shaw
- Children: 2
- Education: Auburn University

Samantha Slimp Shaw (born February 10, 1957) is an American politician. She is a Republican who served as State Auditor of Alabama from 2007 to 2015. She was also a member of the Executive Committee of the Alabama Republican Party.

== Biography ==
Shaw was born in Homewood, Alabama to June Daly and William M. 'Bill' Slimp. She graduated from Auburn University and was employed as an accountant for the Shaw Oil Company, for a branch of La-Z-Boy Furniture Gallery, and for Alabama Steel Supply. She has also worked as a bookkeeper and office manager. In 1980, she married attorney Gregory Shaw. The couple have lived in Montgomery, Alabama for over 23 years, and have two sons.

== Political career ==
In 2000, she was manager of her husband's successful campaign for Judge of the Alabama Court of Criminal Appeals, and in 2006 was manager of his successful re-election campaign. Gregory Shaw was elected to the Alabama Supreme Court in 2008.

In 2002, Shaw was the Deputy Finance Director for the re-election campaign of U.S. Senator Jeff Sessions.

In 2006, Shaw ran for State Auditor. She finished second of four candidates in the Republican primary, with 26.4% of the vote, and won the run-off with 50.8%. She won in the general election with 54.1%.

In 2010, Shaw was elected to a second term as State Auditor, winning with 62.7% of the vote.

Party political offices
Preceded by Beth Chapman	Republican nominee for State Auditor of Alabama; 2006, 2010	Succeeded by Jim Zeigler
Political offices
Preceded by Beth Chapman	State Auditor of Alabama; 2007–2015	Succeeded by Jim Zeigler
