= William Peyton Cobb =

American politician (1880–1963)

30th Secretary of State of Alabama
- In office 1919–1923
- Governor: Thomas Kilby
- Preceded by: John Purifoy
- Succeeded by: Sidney Herbert Blan

Personal details
- Born: January 1, 1880
- Died: July 23, 1963 (aged 83)
- Party: Democratic

William Peyton Cobb (1880–1963) served as the 30th Secretary of State of Alabama from 1919 to 1923.

Cobb was born on January 1, 1880. In 1900, he graduated from Troy Normal College, now known as Troy University and graduated from Law School at the University of Alabama in 1905.

He died on July 23, 1963.
