= Jim Zeigler =

American politician (born 1948)

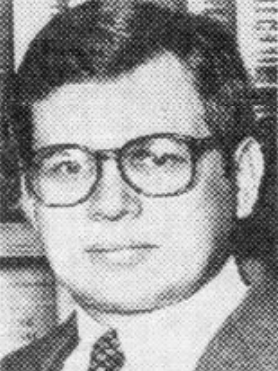
- Zeigler in 1982

40th Auditor of Alabama
- In office January 19, 2015 – January 16, 2023
- Governor: Robert Bentley; Kay Ivey
- Preceded by: Samantha Shaw
- Succeeded by: Andrew Sorrell

Member of the Alabama Public Service Commission for Place 1
- In office January 1975 – January 15, 1979
- Governor: George Wallace
- Preceded by: Jack Owen
- Succeeded by: Pete Matthews

Personal details
- Born: May 23, 1948 (age 78) Sylacauga, Alabama, U.S.
- Party: Democratic (before 1996); Republican (1996–present)
- Education: University of Alabama (BA); Faulkner University (JD)

Jim Zeigler (born May 23, 1948) is an American lawyer and politician who served as state auditor of Alabama from 2015 to 2023. Before becoming state auditor, he served on the Alabama Public Service Commission from 1974 to 1978.

== Early life and education ==
While a student at the University of Alabama, Zeigler served as the president of the Student Government Association (SGA). Zeigler lived at Mallet Hall from 1966 to 1970, and served as SGA president from 1970-71. He was one of the few to be elected to the post in opposition to "The Machine," a semi-secret alignment of fraternities and sororities that historically dominated the university's student government. He graduated from the university in 1972. In 1978, he graduated from the Faulkner University Jones School of Law.

== Early political career ==
Zeigler won a position on the Alabama Public Service Commission in 1974, at the age of 24. He did not run for reelection in 1978.

Zeigler ran for state office unsuccessfully seven times, four as a Democrat, and three as a Republican, losing elections for President of the Public Service Commission in 1976, the Alabama Board of Education in 1978, Supreme Court of Alabama in 1982, State Treasurer of Alabama in 1986, the Alabama Court of Civil Appeals in 1996, Public Service Commission in 1998, and State Auditor of Alabama in 2002. These close losses earned him the nickname "Mr. 49 Percent". In 2006, Zeigler announced the end of his political activism, as he resigned from the Conservative Christians of Alabama and the League of Christian Voters, two political action committees for which he served as chairman.

== State auditor ==
Zeigler ran for state auditor in 2014. In the Republican primary, Zeigler faced Dale Peterson, candidate for Agriculture Commissioner in 2010; Adam Thompson, Deputy Chief of Staff in the Alabama Secretary of State's office; and Hobbie Sealy, former Deputy Conservation Commissioner. Zeigler won a runoff against Peterson, and defeated Miranda Joseph, the Democratic Party nominee, in the general election. In 2015, Zeigler filed lawsuits against Luther Strange, the Attorney General of Alabama, and Baldwin County, Alabama schools to stop them from spending taxpayer money on political campaigns. The suits were dismissed.

Following the Charleston church shooting in June 2015, Zeigler advocated that parishioners take their guns to church. Zeigler gave a speech to the League of the South, termed a hate group by the Southern Poverty Law Center, in September 2015.

In March 2016, Zeigler filed an ethics complaint against Robert J. Bentley, the Governor of Alabama, for allegedly using state funds in an extramarital affair. A year later the Ethics Commission found "probable cause" against Bentley. And three days later, Bentley resigned.

On March 2, 2017, Zeigler became embroiled in nationwide controversy and condemnation when he posted a picture on Twitter comparing Congresswomen dressed in white to the Ku Klux Klan. Zeigler defended his post, saying that when the Congresswomen wore white as a symbol of Women's Suffrage at a speech by President Trump, "when they did that, they opened themselves up to criticisms and questions about that."

In November 2017, following the allegations of child molestation made against Republican Roy Moore, Zeigler was quoted as saying: "Even if you accept the Washington Post's report as being completely true, it's much ado about very little." Zeigler argued that relationships between grown men and teenage girls were acceptable because "take Joseph and Mary. Mary was a teenager and Joseph was an adult carpenter. They became parents of Jesus." Multiple Biblical scholars disputed his defense, noting that the exact ages of Joseph and Mary at the time they were betrothed or married remain uncertain, as they are not included in the Bible. In addition, Jesuit priest Jim Martin tweeted that "...comparing the allegations against Roy Moore in any way to Joseph and Mary is disgusting."

In January 2019, Zeigler came under fire for comments aimed at U.S. Senator Kyrsten Sinema, calling her choice of clothing while on the Senate floor "improperly attired."

In 2019, Zeigler led a successful grassroots movement to block a proposed toll bridge on Interstate 10 across the Mobile Bay.

In the March 3, 2020, Alabama Republican presidential primary, Jim Zeigler lost to Governor Kay Ivey for the Place 1 Delegate at the Republican National Convention.

In February 2020, Jim Zeigler and his wife Jackie successfully teamed up to fight the proposed Amendment One which would have replaced the elected school board, which his wife is a member of, with one appointed by the governor. Amendment One was soundly defeated in the March 2020 primary.

Zeigler was considered a possible candidate for the 2022 Alabama gubernatorial election; he informally campaigned for the position, filed paperwork to run, and formed an exploratory committee, but never officially announced a run. Zeigler announced on January 23, 2022, that he ultimately would not run for governor, citing a lack of funds compared to the leading candidates, including incumbent Governor Kay Ivey, Lynda Blanchard, and Tim James. Three days later, Zeigler announced that he would run for Secretary of State of Alabama in the 2022 election instead, claiming that "national attempts to manipulate honest election procedures" were a major threat. Zeigler won the first round of voting on May 24, 2022, but did not pass the threshold to avoid a runoff. State representative Wes Allen rebounded in the runoff on June 21, defeating Zeigler for the nomination.

Zeigler was term-limited as State Auditor and could not seek re-election in 2022, and was succeeded by Andrew Sorrell. Since leaving office, Zeigler has been a contributor to the Alabama-based conservative news website 1819 News.

== Personal life ==
Zeigler is married to Jackie Zeigler, a member of the Alabama State Board of Education, and has two children.

== Electoral history ==
Alabama Court of Civil Appeals Justice Republican Primary Election, 1996
Party	Candidate	Votes	%
Republican	Bill Thompson	86,545	50.40
Republican	Jim Zeigler	85,161	49.60

Alabama Public Service Commissioner Republican Primary Election, 1998
Party	Candidate	Votes	%
Republican	George Wallace Jr.	184,333	59.05
Republican	Jim Zeigler	94,968	30.42
Republican	(first name not given) Lyon	32,888	10.53

Alabama Auditor Republican Primary Election, 2002
Party	Candidate	Votes	%
Republican	Jim Zeigler	123,279	42.9
Republican	Beth Chapman	82,013	28.6
Republican	Pat Duncan	51,553	18.0
Republican	Meredith Mayes	30,279	10.5

Alabama Auditor Republican Primary Runoff Election, 2002
Party	Candidate	Votes	%
Republican	Beth Chapman	73,118	52.56
Republican	Jim Zeigler	65,983	47.44

Alabama Auditor Republican Primary Election, 2014
Party	Candidate	Votes	%
Republican	Jim Zeigler	164,002	47.07
Republican	Dale Peterson	84,828	24.35
Republican	Adam Thompson	64,688	18.57
Republican	Hobbie Sealy	34,910	10.02

Alabama Auditor Republican Primary Runoff Election, 2014
Party	Candidate	Votes	%
Republican	Jim Zeigler	131,637	65
Republican	Dale Peterson	71,141	35

Alabama Auditor Election, 2014
Party	Candidate	Votes	%
Republican	Jim Zeigler	716,122	62.93
Democratic	Miranda Joseph	420,843	36.98
Write-ins	Write-ins	1,010	0.09

Alabama Auditor Republican Primary Election, 2018
Party	Candidate	Votes	%
Republican	Jim Zeigler	262,153	55.6
Republican	Stan Cooke	153,578	32.6
Republican	Elliott Lipinsky	55,624	11.8

Alabama Auditor Election, 2018
Party	Candidate	Votes	%
Republican	Jim Zeigler	1,010,905	60.6
Democratic	Miranda Joseph	658,272	39.4
Write-ins	Write-ins	1,362	0.10

Party political offices
Preceded by Samantha Shaw	Republican nominee for Auditor of Alabama; 2014, 2018	Succeeded by Andrew Sorrell
Political offices
Preceded by Samantha Shaw	Auditor of Alabama; 2015–2023	Succeeded by Andrew Sorrell
