= Jan Cook =

American politician

34th Auditor of Alabama
- In office 1983–1991
- Preceded by: Bettye Frink
- Succeeded by: Terry Ellis

Personal details
- Party: Democratic
- Profession: Politician

Jan Cook was the Alabama State Auditor from 1983 to 1991. A Democrat, she was the youngest person to ever be elected as State Auditor in Alabama's history.

Party political offices
Preceded by Bettye Frink	Democratic nominee for State Auditor of Alabama; 1982, 1986	Succeeded by Terry Ellis
