= Agnes Baggett =

American politician (1905–1992)

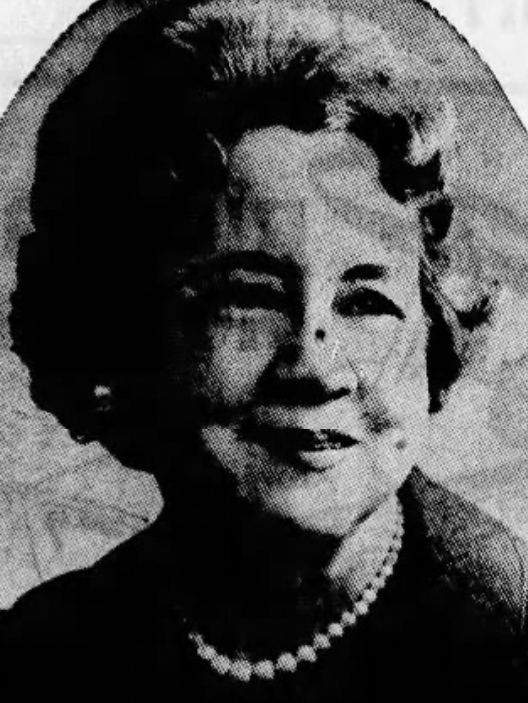

38th, 41st & 43rd Secretary of State of Alabama
- In office 1975–1979
- Governor: George Wallace
- Preceded by: Mabel Sanders Amos
- Succeeded by: Don Siegelman
- In office 1963–1967
- Governor: George Wallace
- Preceded by: Bettye Frink
- Succeeded by: Mabel Sanders Amos
- In office 1951–1955
- Governor: Gordon Persons
- Preceded by: Sibyl Pool
- Succeeded by: Mary Texas Hurt Garner

31st & 33rd Alabama State Treasurer
- In office 1967–1975
- Governor: Lurleen Wallace; Albert Brewer; George Wallace
- Preceded by: Mary Texas Hurt Garner
- Succeeded by: Melba Till Allen
- In office 1959–1963
- Governor: John M. Patterson
- Preceded by: John Brandon
- Succeeded by: Mary Texas Hurt Garner

State Auditor of Alabama
- In office 1955–1959
- Governor: Jim Folsom
- Preceded by: John M. Brandon
- Succeeded by: Mary Texas Hurt Garner

Personal details
- Born: April 9, 1905 Columbus, Georgia, U.S.
- Died: December 15, 1992 (aged 87)
- Party: Democratic
- Spouse: George Lamar Baggett (m. 1926; died 1949)

Agnes Beahn Baggett (April 9, 1905 – December 15, 1992) was an American politician who served in the state of Alabama. She served as Alabama's Secretary of State from 1951 to 1955, 1963–1967 and 1975–1979. She also served as Alabama State Treasurer from 1959–1963 and 1967–1975. She was also the inaugural holder of the position of State Auditor.

== Early life ==
Baggett was born and raised in Columbus, Georgia where she was educated in public schools.

== Career ==
Baggett served as law clerk in the office of the district attorney of the L. & N. Railroad at Montgomery from March 1925 to October 1927, and in the Alabama Secretary of State's office from October 1927 to March 1946. She also served as assistant clerk of the Supreme Court of Alabama from August 15, 1946, until the spring of 1950.

In 1951, Baggett served as the Alabama Secretary of State until 1955. In 1955 Baggett served as the Alabama state auditor until 1959. In 1959, Baggett served as the Alabama State Treasurer again until 1963. In 1963, Baggett served as the Alabama Secretary of State again until 1967. In 1967, Baggett served as the Alabama State Treasurer again until 1975. In 1975, Baggett served as the Alabama Secretary of State again until 1979. Baggett was one of the most elected officials in Alabama history.

Party political offices
Preceded by Bettye Frink	Democratic nominee for Secretary of State of Alabama; 1962	Succeeded by Mabel Sanders Amos
Preceded by Mary Texas Hurt Garner	Democratic nominee for Alabama State Treasurer; 1966, 1970	Succeeded by Melba Till Allen
Preceded by Mabel Sanders Amos	Democratic nominee for Secretary of State of Alabama; 1974	Succeeded by Don Siegelman
