= Bettye Frink =

American politician (1933–2025)

State Auditor of Alabama
- In office 1975–1983
- Governor: George Wallace; Fob James
- Preceded by: Melba Till Allen
- Succeeded by: Jan Cook
- In office 1963–1967
- Governor: George Wallace
- Preceded by: Mary Texas Hurt Garner
- Succeeded by: Melba Till Allen

40th Secretary of State of Alabama
- In office 1959–1963
- Governor: John M. Patterson
- Preceded by: Mary Texas Hurt Garner
- Succeeded by: Agnes Baggett

Personal details
- Born: February 19, 1933
- Died: November 24, 2025 (aged 92)
- Party: Democratic

Bettye Frink (February 19, 1933 – November 24, 2025) was an American politician from Alabama. She served as State Auditor from 1963 to 1967 and 1975 to 1983. She also served as Secretary of State of Alabama from 1959 to 1963.

== Life and career ==
From 1955 to 1957, Frink was employed by the U.S. Treasury Dispersing Office and the Internal Revenue Service. Mrs. Frink was chosen to the first elected State Board of Education and served until 1975. In 1960, she was a delegate, state-at-large to the Democratic National Convention.

Frink was married to William David Frink and they had four children. She died on November 24, 2025, at the age of 92.

Party political offices
Preceded by Mary Texas Hurt Garner	Democratic nominee for Secretary of State of Alabama; 1958	Succeeded by Agnes Baggett
Preceded by Mary Texas Hurt Garner	Democratic nominee for State Auditor of Alabama; 1962	Succeeded by Melba Till Allen
Preceded by Melba Till Allen	Democratic nominee for State Auditor of Alabama; 1974, 1978	Succeeded by Jan Cook
