= Sibyl Pool =

American politician

29th Alabama State Treasurer
- In office 1951–1955
- Governor: Gordon Persons
- Preceded by: John Brandon
- Succeeded by: John Brandon

37th Secretary of State of Alabama
- In office 1944–1951
- Governor: Chauncey Sparks; Jim Folsom
- Preceded by: David Howell Turner
- Succeeded by: Agnes Baggett

Personal details
- Born: 1901
- Died: 1973 (aged 71–72)
- Party: Democratic

Sibyl Murphree Pool (1901–1973) was a politician from Alabama. She was first appointed as the Secretary of State of Alabama in 1944 following the resignation of David Howell Turner. In 1950, she was elected Alabama State Treasurer and served until 1955.

Pool was born in 1901 in York, Alabama. She graduated from Alabama State College for Women, now known as the University of Montevallo. She then went on to attend the Livingston State Teacher's College. In 1936, she was elected to fill in a two-year vacancy in the Alabama House of Representatives. In 1944, Governor Chauncey Sparks appointed Pool to serve as Secretary of State. In 1946, she became the first woman elected to statewide office in Alabama as Secretary of State. She ran for treasurer in 1950 and carried 65 of 67 of Alabama's counties. In 1954, she was elected to the first of four terms on the Alabama Public Service Commission, garnishing the largest percentage of the vote in all 67 counties.

She died in 1973.
