= State Auditor of Alabama =

U.S. state government position

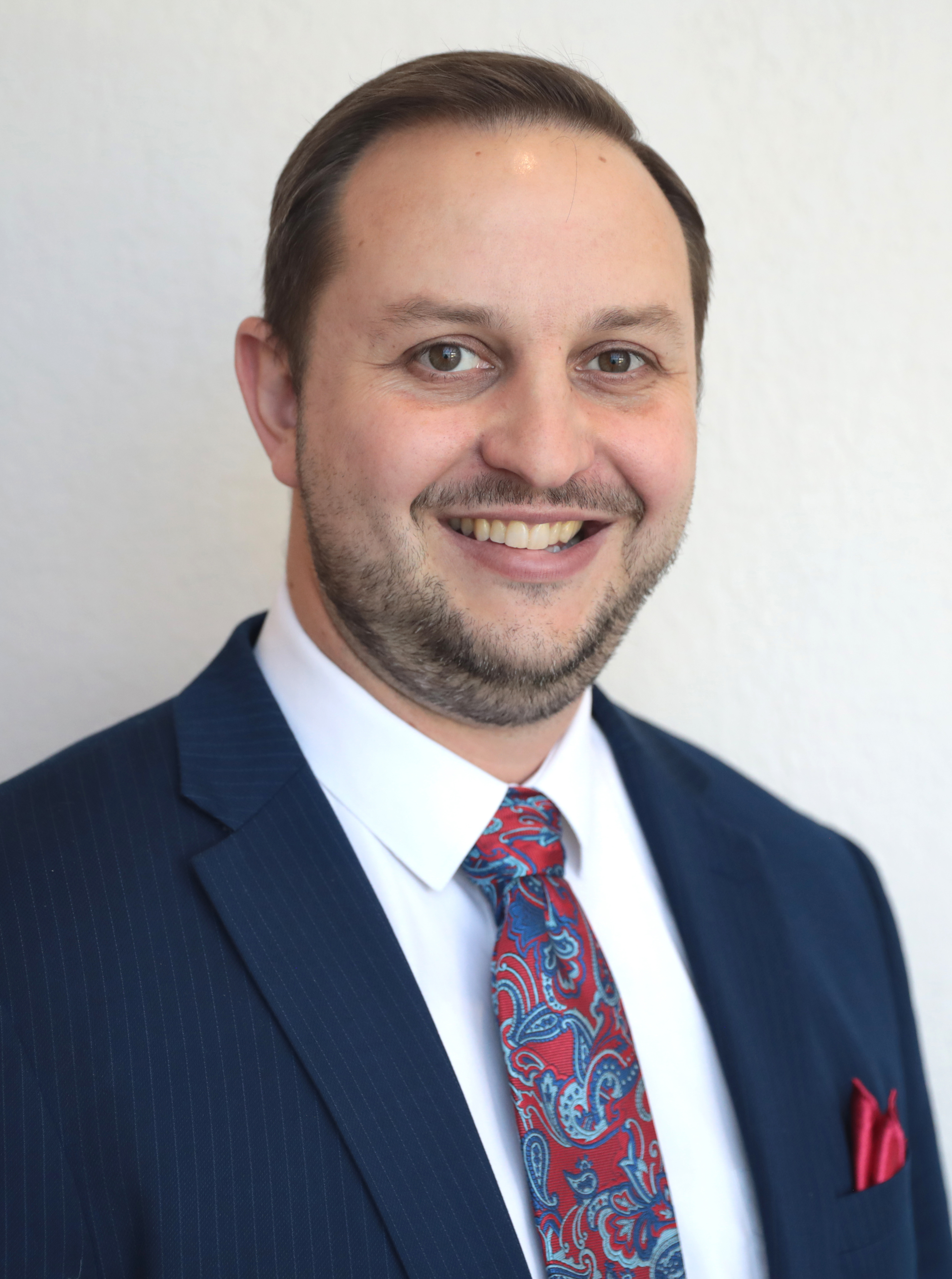
- Incumbent; Andrew Sorrell since January 16, 2023
- Type: State Auditor
- Term length: Two consecutive terms
- Succession: Fifth
- Website: Official website

The state auditor of Alabama is constitutionally required to make a complete report to the governor of Alabama showing the receipts and disbursement of every character, all claims audited and paid out, and all taxes and revenues collected and paid into the treasury. The office also makes other reports to the governor and the Alabama Legislature as the law requires. Since 1969, the office has been responsible for maintaining all property records of all non-consumable property of the State of Alabama. Until 1899 the office was responsible for maintaining all land records of the state when at that time, that function was transferred to the Alabama Forestry Commission. A separate Office of Public Examiners administers audits conducted by the state.

The state auditor also serves as a member of The State Board of Adjustment, The State Board of Appointment for Boards of Registrars, The State Board of Compromise, The Alabama Education Authority (ex officio), and The Penny Trust Fund.

== Election of State Auditor ==
The state auditor is an elected post chosen in partisan elections. It is elected in the same cycle as the other constitutional officers of the U.S. state of Alabama, including the governor, lieutenant governor, attorney general, state treasurer, and secretary of state. State law prohibits any individual from being elected to more than two consecutive terms. Women have traditionally held the office for most of the past sixty years. Nine women have held the post starting with the election of Agnes Baggett in 1954.

The current state auditor is Andrew Sorrell, who took office on January 16, 2023. He was previously a Republican member of the Alabama House of Representatives from the 3rd district. His predecessor as auditor was Jim Zeigler, a fellow Republican who held the office from 2015 to 2023. He was constitutionally ineligible to seek a third term and unsuccessfully ran for Secretary of State of Alabama instead. Sorrell won the Republican primary and general election to succeed Zeigler in 2022.

Listed below are the state auditors for the past several terms:

- Andrew Sorrell (R) (2023–present)
- Jim Zeigler (R) (2015–2023)
- Samantha Shaw (R) (2007–2015)
- Beth Chapman (R) (2003–2007)
- Susan Parker (D) (1999–2003)
- Pat Duncan (R) (1995–1999)
- Terry Ellis (D) (1991–1995)
- Jan Cook (D) (1983–1991)
- Bettye Frink (D) (1975–1983)
- Melba Till Allen (D) (1967–1975)
- Bettye Frink (D) (1963–1967)
- Mary Texas Hurt Garner (D) (1959–1963)
- Agnes Baggett (D) (1955–1959)

== 2006 State Auditor of Alabama election ==
=== Republican primary ===
Republican primary results
Party	Candidate	Votes	%
Republican	Wes Allen	102,520	30.66%
Republican	Samantha Shaw	88,114	26.35%
Republican	Tripp Skipper	74,436	22.26%
Republican	Chess Bedsole	69,321	20.73%
Total votes		334,391	100%

=== Runoff results ===
Republican primary runoff results
Party	Candidate	Votes	%
Republican	Samantha Shaw	83,176	50.76%
Republican	Wes Allen	80,671	49.24%
Total votes		163,847	100%

=== Democratic primary ===
Democratic primary results
Party	Candidate	Votes	%
Democratic	Janie Baker Clarke	194,283	51.24%
Democratic	Charley Baker	116,624	30.76%
Democratic	Wayne Sowell	68,223	18.00%
Total votes		379,130	100%

=== General election ===
Results by county Shaw: 50–60%; 60–70%; 70–80%; Clarke: 50–60%; 60–70%; 70–80%; 80–90%

2006 Alabama State Auditor election
Party	Candidate	Votes	%
Republican	Samantha Shaw	627,424	54.08%
Democratic	Janie Baker Clarke	531,717	45.83%
Write-in		946	0.09%
Total votes		1,160,087	100%
Republican hold			

== 2002 State Auditor of Alabama election ==
=== Republican primary ===
Republican primary results
Party	Candidate	Votes	%
Republican	Jim Zeigler	123,279	42.94%
Republican	Beth Chapman	82,013	28.56%
Republican	Pat Duncan	51,553	17.95%
Republican	Meredith Mayes	30,279	10.55%
Total votes		287,124	100%

=== Runoff results ===
Republican primary runoff results
Party	Candidate	Votes	%
Republican	Beth Chapman	73,118	52.56%
Republican	Jim Zeigler	65,983	47.44%
Total votes		139,101	100%

=== Democratic primary ===
Democratic primary results
Party	Candidate	Votes	%
Democratic	Carolyn Gibson	158,850	44.86%
Democratic	Debbie Tucker Corbett	75,534	21.33%
Democratic	Karen Haiden Jackson	54,113	15.28%
Democratic	Jerry Morgan Nelson, Jr.	39,734	11.22%
Democratic	Earl Mack "Choo-Choo" Gavin	25,886	7.31%
Total votes		354,117	100%

=== Runoff results ===
Democratic primary runoff results
Party	Candidate	Votes	%
Democratic	Carolyn Gibson	158,707	64.35%
Democratic	Debbie Tucker Corbett	87,940	35.65%
Total votes		246,647	100%

=== General election ===
Results by county Chapman: 40–50%; 50–60%; 60–70%; 70–80%; Gibson: 40–50%; 50–60%; 60–70%; 70–80%; 80–90%

2002 Alabama State Auditor election
Party	Candidate	Votes	%
Republican	Beth Chapman	655,189	51.28%
Democratic	Carolyn Gibson	579,899	45.39%
Libertarian	Franklin Reeves	41,397	3.24%
Write-in		1,178	0.09%
Total votes		1,277,663	100%
Republican gain from Democratic			
