= 1902 Alabama Secretary of State election =

- November 4, 1902
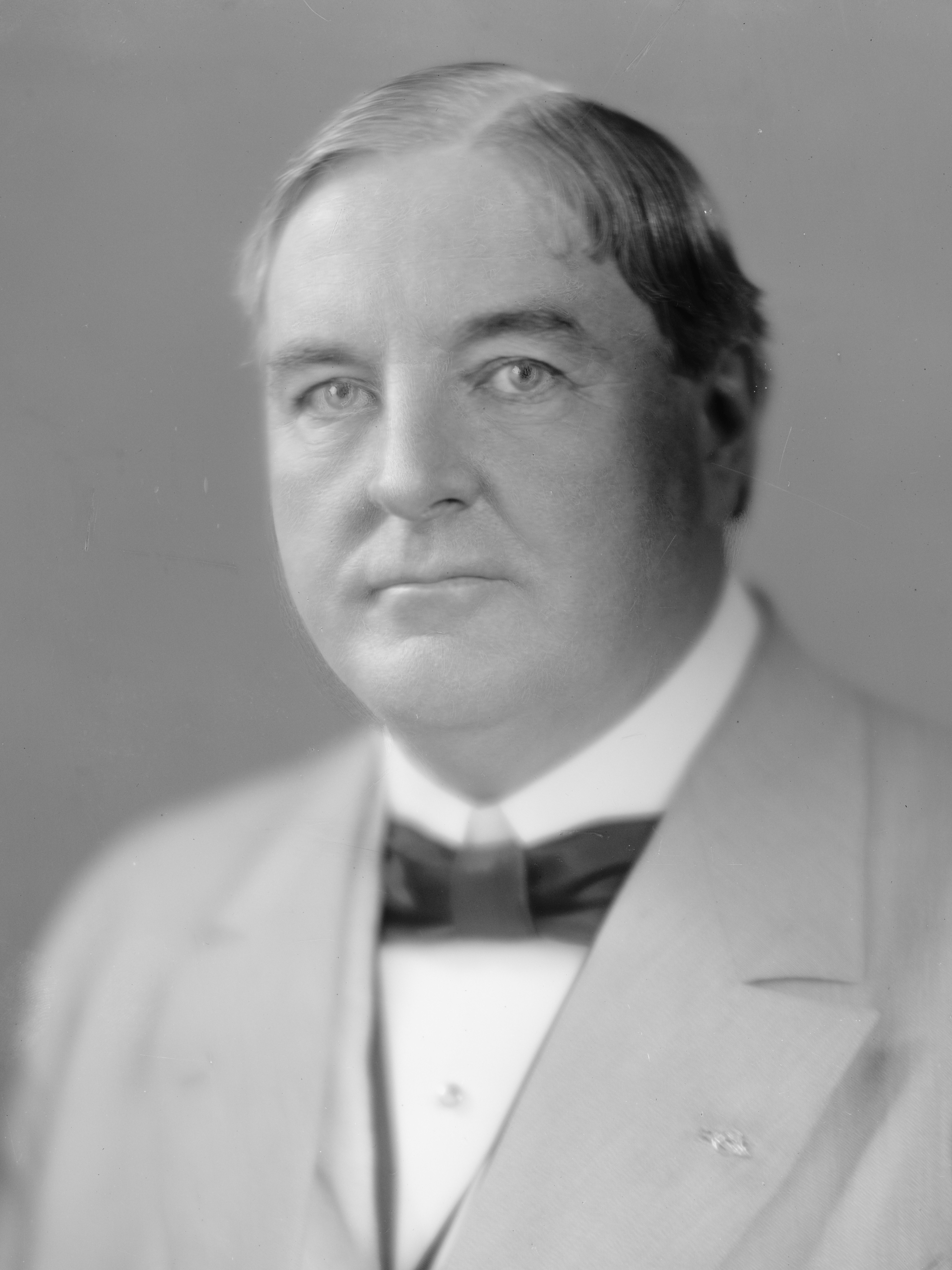

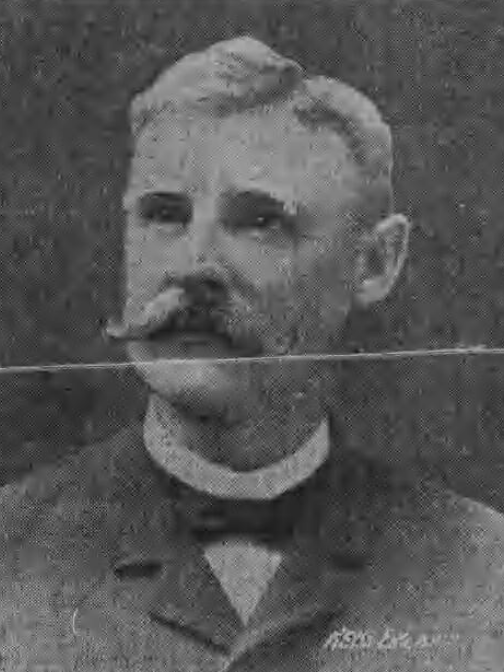
Candidate	J. Thomas Heflin	J. H. Karter
Party	Democratic	Republican
Popular vote	65,771	22,248
Percentage	74.7%	25.3%
Secretary of State before election
Robert P. McDavid
Democratic
Elected Secretary of State
J. Thomas Heflin
Democratic

The 1902 Alabama Secretary of State election was held on November 4, 1902, to elect the Secretary of State of Alabama to a four-year term. Democratic nominee J. Thomas Heflin was elected.

== Nominees ==
- J. H. Karter (Republican)
- J. Thomas Heflin (Democratic)

== Results ==
1902 Alabama Secretary of State election
Party	Candidate	Votes	%
Democratic	J. Thomas Heflin	65,771	74.72
Republican	J. H. Karter	22,248	25.27
Prohibition	W. D. Witherspoon (write-in)	10	0.01
Total votes		88,029	100.00
