= McDavid =

McDavid is a surname. Notable people with the surname include:

- Connor McDavid (born 1997), Canadian ice hockey player
- David McDavid, (Born 1942), American businessman
- Edmund R. McDavid (1870–1948), American politician
- Eric McDavid (born 1977), American green anarchist
- Herbert Gladstone McDavid, (1898–1966), British businessman
- O.C. McDavid, (1911-1998), American journalist
- Raven I. McDavid, Jr. (1911–1984), American linguist
- Ray McDavid (born 1971), American baseball player
- Robert P. McDavid, (1867-1915), American businessman and politician

== See also ==
- 17185 Mcdavid, main-belt asteroid
- McDavid, Florida, unincorporated community
- Murray McDavid, Scotch whisky bottling company
- MacDavid, an Israeli hamburger restaurant chain
