= Dave Thomas (politician) =

American politician

Mayor of Springville, Alabama
- In office November 2, 2020 – November 3, 2025
- Preceded by: William "Butch" Isley
- Succeeded by: Austin Phillips

Member of the Alabama House of Representatives from the 49th district
- In office 1994–2002
- Preceded by: Tony Petelos
- Succeeded by: Cam Ward

Personal details
- Born: May 12, 1965 (age 61) St. Petersburg, Florida, U.S.
- Party: Republican
- Spouse: Bonnie Thomas
- Children: 2
- Education: University of Montevallo (BBA)

Dave Thomas (born May 12, 1965) is an American politician and businessman. He was the mayor of Springville, Alabama, from 2020 to 2025. A former state legislator, he served in the Alabama House of Representatives from 1994 to 2002, representing the 49th district, which includes parts of St. Clair County. He was also the Republican Party's nominee for Alabama Secretary of State in 2002 but lost to Nancy Worley. He was a candidate for the Republican primary in the 2022 Alabama gubernatorial election.

== Early life and education ==
Born on May 12, 1965, in St. Petersburg, Florida, Thomas graduated from the University of Montevallo with a BBA. He began residing in Springville, Alabama, in 1991, where he was the president of the town's parent-teacher organization.

== Political career ==
Due to his experience with the Springville parent-teacher organization, Thomas initially considered a campaign for the Alabama Board of Education, but he was convinced by his friend Jack Williams to run for the state legislature instead. Thomas was first elected to the Alabama House of Representatives in 1994. He served two terms until 2002. During Thomas' re-election campaign in 1998, absentee ballots at the St. Clair County Courthouse were tampered with, which necessitated a recount. Thomas won re-election by a thin margin of around one percent. He later stated that this incident led him to run for Alabama Secretary of State in 2002.

In 2002, Thomas ran for the Republican Party's nomination for the Alabama Secretary of State election. Thomas was engaged in a fierce primary battle against Troy King and Dean Young, the latter of whom he went to a run-off with and won against. Thomas received the endorsement of The Tuscaloosa News during the primary. As the nominee, Thomas supported voter ID efforts in the state, attempting to quell voter irregularity. Thomas raised and spent $90,000 without using television commercials but was defeated in the general election by Nancy Worley.

After his defeat, Thomas founded and served as president of Alabama's Premier Service Company (APSCO), a commercial pressure washing business. His other business ventures include TB & Associates Inc., of which APSCO is a subsidiary, as well as a for-profit primitive campground known as the Little Canoe Creek Campground. He returned to politics in 2020, when he ran for mayor of Springville, Alabama. He defeated incumbent mayor William "Butch" Isley in a landslide. Thomas later described his victory in the election as "hand[ing] Butch Isley his head on a platter". He stated that he hoped to attract small business entrepreneurship to the town, and turn it into "the Mountain Brook of St. Clair County".

During his tenure as mayor, Thomas appointed Lieutenant Wayne Walton as Springville's chief of police. Thomas walked out of a city council meeting on March 1, 2021, self-declaring an adjournment after a disagreement with city council members over them requesting separate legal representation from the mayor. Thomas apologized at the next meeting, stating "I kind of lost sight of what I had tried to teach my children growing up; if you lose your head you lose the argument". On October 18, 2021, the city leadership approved a new contract with EcoSouth for garbage services, replacing Waste Management, as well as an $11 million budget.

In January 2022, Thomas announced that he would seek the Republican nomination for governor in the 2022 election. Thomas gained attention for his support of marijuana legalization, uncommon for the Republican Party. Thomas admitted that he personally smokes marijuana in interviews that month, stating that he was an example of achieving success while a marijuana user. Thomas also expressed support for school choice and described himself as a free market economist. After Thomas' admission of marijuana use, the Springville city council said it had received numerous calls regarding his comments. At the same meeting on January 25, 2022, the city council issued a proclamation expressing support for law enforcement, though not mentioning Thomas by name.

In the May 24 primary, Thomas finished in seventh place out of nine candidates on the ballot in the gubernatorial race. He received 0.5% of the vote.

In the August 2025 municipal elections, Thomas ran for reelection as mayor of Springville but was defeated in a major landslide; he lost to city councilman Austin Phillips, who received around 84% of the vote. Thomas was succeeded as mayor by Phillips after a swearing-in that November.

== Personal life ==
Thomas has been married to his wife Bonnie Thomas since he was 17, and he first became a father at 18. The couple have two children and four grandchildren. He is an attendee of the First Baptist Church in Springville. He is also an enthusiast of skydiving and bagpipe playing. Thomas has performed at weddings and funerals, wearing a kilt as he plays the bagpipes.

== Electoral history ==
2025 Springville, Alabama, mayoral election
Party	Candidate	Votes	%
Nonpartisan	Austin Phillips	1,069	84.5%
Nonpartisan	Dave Thomas (incumbent)	137	10.8%
Nonpartisan	Russell Starnes	59	4.7%
Total votes		1,265	100.0%

2022 Alabama gubernatorial election, Republican primary results
Party	Candidate	Votes	%
Republican	Kay Ivey (incumbent)	356,347	54.46%
Republican	Lynda Blanchard	125,915	19.24%
Republican	Tim James	105,936	16.19%
Republican	Lew Burdette	42,803	6.54%
Republican	Dean Odle	11,720	1.79%
Republican	Donald Trent Jones	3,906	0.58%
Republican	Dave Thomas	2,879	0.44%
Republican	Stacy Lee George	2,539	0.39%
Republican	Dean Young	2,344	0.36%
Total votes		654,290	100%

2020 Springville, Alabama, mayoral election
Party	Candidate	Votes	%
Nonpartisan	Dave Thomas	883	66.9%
Nonpartisan	William "Butch" Isley (incumbent)	437	33.1%
Total votes		1,320	100.0%

2002 Alabama Secretary of State, general election results
Party	Candidate	Votes	%
Democratic	Nancy Worley	632,852	49.0%
Republican	Dave Thomas	630,863	48.9%
Libertarian	Mark Bodenhausen	25,386	2.0%
Write-in		1,179	0.1%
Total votes		1,290,280	100.0%

1998 Alabama House of Representatives, 49th district, general election results
Party	Candidate	Votes	%
Republican	Dave Thomas (incumbent)	7,473	50.5%
Democratic	Blair	7,321	49.4%
Write-in		17	0.1%
Total votes		14,811	100.0%

1994 Alabama House of Representatives, 49th district, general election results
Party	Candidate	Votes	%
Republican	Dave Thomas	6,614	52.9%
Democratic	H. Holliday	5,872	47.0%
Write-in		7	0.1%
Total votes		12,493	100.0%

Party political offices
Preceded by James R. Bennett	Republican nominee for Secretary of State of Alabama; 2002	Succeeded by Beth Chapman
