= Glenn Andrews =

American politician (1909–2008)

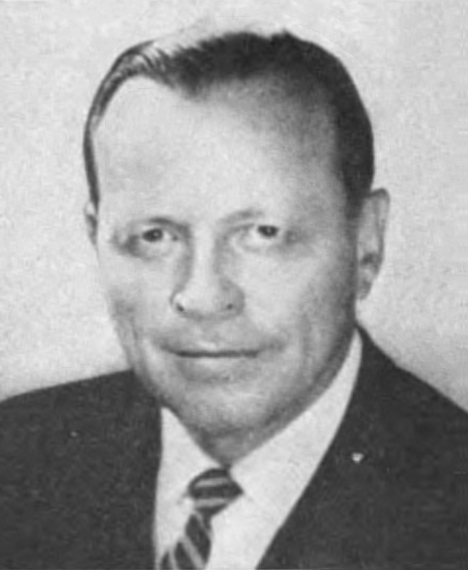

Member of the U.S. House of Representatives from Alabama's 4th district
- In office January 3, 1965 – January 3, 1967
- Preceded by: Kenneth A. Roberts (redistricting)
- Succeeded by: Bill Nichols

Personal details
- Born: Arthur Glenn Andrews; January 15, 1909 Anniston, Alabama, U.S.
- Died: September 25, 2008 (aged 99) White Plains, Alabama, U.S.
- Party: Republican
- Spouse: Ethel Standish Jackson
- Education: Princeton University (A.B.)

Arthur Glenn Andrews (January 15, 1909 – September 25, 2008) was an American politician and a United States representative from Alabama.

== Biography ==
Andrews was born in Anniston in Calhoun County in North Alabama, a son of Roger Lee Andrews and the former Beryl Elizabeth Jones. He attended public schools in Birmingham and attended John Herbert Phillips High School there. He then graduated from Mercersburg Academy, a boarding school in Mercersburg, Pennsylvania. Andrews graduated from Princeton University with an A.B. in politics in 1931 after completing an 83-page long senior thesis titled "Mr. Charles Evans Hughes. A Study of his Early Life, and Some of His Economic Opinions." He married Ethel Standish Jackson in 1937.

== Career ==
Associated with National City Bank of New York, from 1931 to 1933, Andrews was then with International Business Machines (IBM), from 1933 to 1936. He became district manager of an Eastman Kodak subsidiary, from 1936 to 1946; and was an advertising executive, from 1946 to 1970, excluding his single term in Congress.

An Alabama Republican, Andrews represented Alabama's 4th congressional district, since mainly the 3rd district, in the United States House of Representatives. The district centered on Andrews' birthplace of Anniston. Andrews was one of five Republicans elected to Congress in 1964, the first time Alabama had sent any Republicans to Congress since the end of Reconstruction. The others were Jack Edwards, William L. Dickinson, John H. Buchanan Jr., and James D. Martin.

Andrews served only in the 89th Congress from January 3, 1965, to January 3, 1967. He and other Alabama members opposed the Voting Rights Act of 1965, which passed after the landmark African American-led March from Selma to the state capital at Montgomery. In 1966, Andrews was defeated for reelection by about the same margin that he had won in 1964. He was unseated by the Democratic State Senator Bill Nichols. Nichols received 54,515 votes (58.7 percent) to Andrews' 38,402 (41.3 percent).

For a time, Andrews chaired the Alabama Fourth Congressional District Republican Executive Committee. He sought to return to Congress in the 1970 general election, when George Wallace ran unopposed for a second term as governor. He was overwhelmingly defeated by Nichols, who won 77,701 votes (83.7 percent) to Andrews' 13,217 (14.2 percent). President Richard Nixon appointed Andrews a trustee in bankruptcy court, a position which he held from 1973 to 1985.

== Death ==
Andrews died in White Plains, Calhoun County, Alabama, on September 25, 2008, and was the last living former U.S. representative born in the 1900s decade. He was cremated, and his ashes are interred at Grace Episcopal Church Columbarium, in Anniston, Alabama. Andrews became the oldest former member on November 10, 2007, with the death of former U.S. Representative Augustus Hawkins, a California Democrat. At the time of his death he was the oldest living former member of the United States Congress. Upon Andrews' death, William H. Avery, the Republican governor of Kansas from 1965 to 1967, became the oldest living former member of Congress.

Party political offices
Preceded by	Republican nominee for Secretary of State of Alabama; 1958	Vacant Title next held by Peggy Noel
U.S. House of Representatives
Preceded by Kenneth A. Roberts	Member of the U.S. House of Representatives from Alabama's 4th congressional district 1965–1967	Succeeded by Bill Nichols
Honorary titles
Preceded by Augustus F. Hawkins	Oldest living United States representative (Sitting or former); November 10, 2007 – September 25, 2008	Succeeded by William H. Avery
