= Cody Sigler =

American football player

No. 94 – Auburn Tigers
- Position: Defensive tackle
- Class: Redshirt Senior

Personal information
- Listed height: 6 ft 2 in (1.88 m)
- Listed weight: 308 lb (140 kg)

Career information
- High school: New Hope (New Hope, Alabama)
- College: West Alabama (2022–2024); Arkansas State (2025); Auburn (2026–present)

Awards and highlights
- Second-team All-Sun Belt (2025)
- Stats at ESPN

Cody Sigler is an American college football defensive tackle for the Auburn Tigers. He previously played for the Arkansas State Red Wolves and West Alabama Tigers.

== Early life ==
Sigler attended New Hope High School in New Hope, Alabama. He committed to play college football for the West Alabama Tigers.

== College career ==
In three years at West Alabama from 2022 to 2024, Sigler totaled 41 tackles with 12 for loss, six sacks, three pass deflections, and a fumble recovery in 21 games. After the 2024 season, he entered the NCAA transfer portal.

Sigler transferred to play for the Arkansas State Red Wolves. In 2025, he posted 35 tackles with seven for loss, five sacks, six pass deflections, and a fumble recovery, earning second-team All-Sun Belt honors. After the season, he once again entered the NCAA transfer portal.

Sigler transferred to play for the Auburn Tigers. In Week 7 of the 2026 season, he forced a fumble late in the fourth quarter in an upset win over No. 1 Georgia.
