= Howard Cross =

American football player (born 1967)

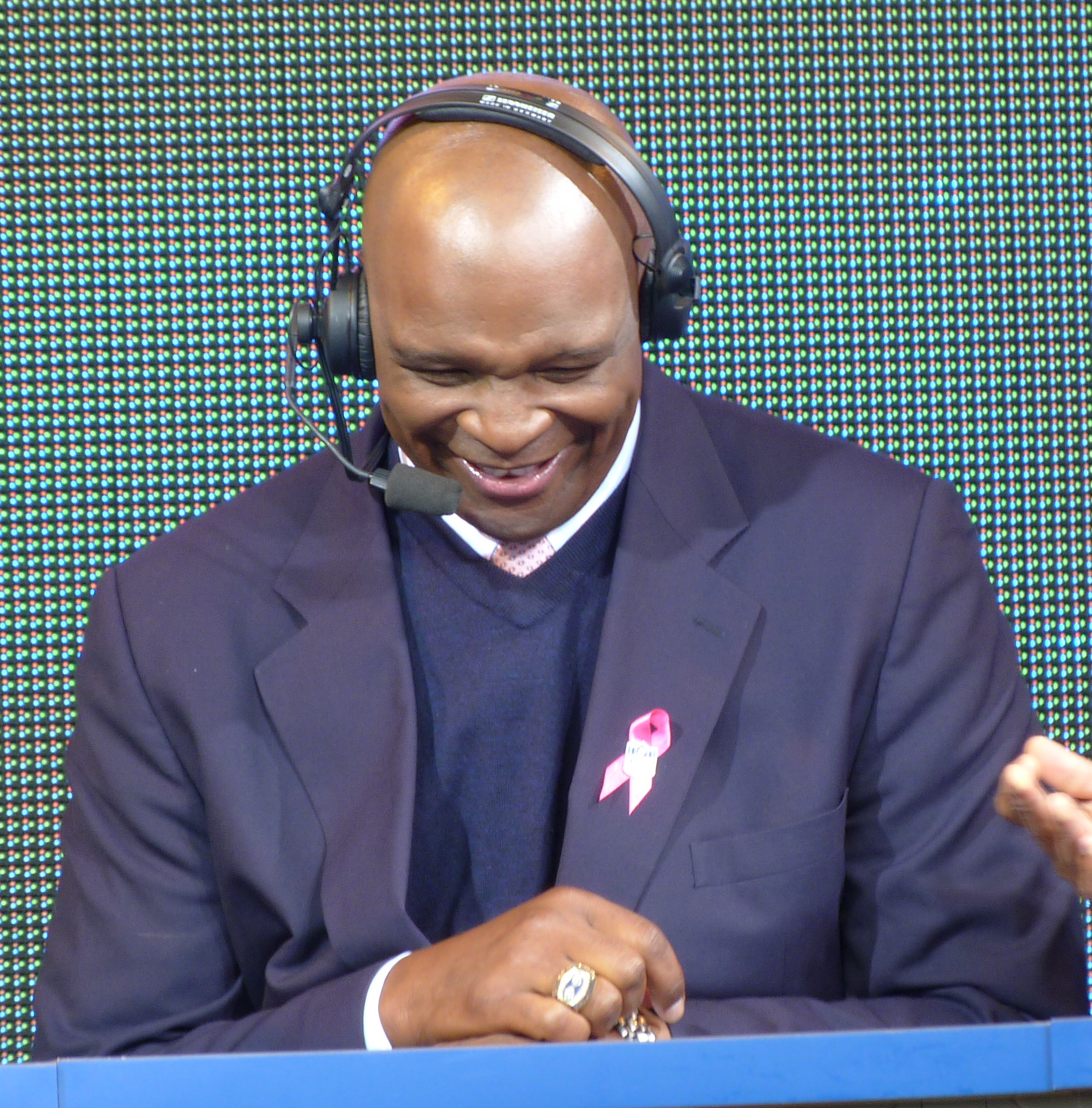
- Cross on the Giants' post-game show in 2012

No. 87
- Position: Tight end

Personal information
- Born: August 8, 1967 (age 59); Huntsville, Alabama, U.S.
- Listed height: 6 ft 5 in (1.96 m)
- Listed weight: 270 lb (122 kg)

Career information
- High school: New Hope
- College: Alabama
- NFL draft: 1989: 6th round, 158th overall pick

Career history
- New York Giants (1989–2001)

Awards and highlights
- Super Bowl champion (XXV); 88th greatest New York Giant of all-time; Jacobs Blocking Trophy (1988)

Career NFL statistics
- Receptions: 201
- Receiving yards: 2,194
- Receiving touchdowns: 17
- Stats at Pro Football Reference

Howard Edward Cross Jr. (born August 8, 1967) is an American retired professional football player and current radio/tv broadcaster. He spent 13 seasons as a tight end for the New York Giants in the National Football League (NFL), and was a member of two Super Bowl teams, Super Bowl XXV in 1991 and appearing in Super Bowl XXXV in 2001. Since 2007, he has served as a broadcaster for the New York Giants radio network, and a broadcaster for the YES Network.

== Early life ==
Cross played football at New Hope High School in New Hope, Alabama. In college, he was a member of the Fellowship of Christian Athletes. He was drafted out of the University of Alabama in the 1989 NFL draft by the New York Giants in the sixth round.

== Career ==
Pre-draft measurables
Height	Weight	40-yard dash	10-yard split	20-yard split	20-yard shuttle	Vertical jump	Broad jump	Bench press
6 ft 5 1/4 in (1.96 m)	251 lb (114 kg)	5.17 s	1.74 s	3.01 s	4.63 s	31.5 in (0.80 m)	9 ft 1 in (2.77 m)	9 reps

Over his career, Cross played in a total of 207 games as a Giant, trailing only Michael Strahan's 216 games, and Eli Manning’s 236 games. Cross won a Super Bowl ring with the Giants in Super Bowl XXV when they defeated the Buffalo Bills 20–19. He was the only player on both the 1990 Giants team as well as the 2000 team that lost Super Bowl XXXV to the Baltimore Ravens 34–7.

Although he was known more for his blocking expertise, he finished his career with 201 receptions for 2,194 yards and 17 touchdowns.

== NFL career statistics ==
Legend
	Won the Super Bowl
**Bold**	Career high

=== Regular season ===
Year	Team	Games		Receiving				
Year	Team	GP	GS	Rec	Yds	Avg	Lng	TD
1989	NYG	16	4	6	107	**17.8**	27	1
1990	NYG	16	8	8	106	13.3	21	0
1991	NYG	16	16	20	283	14.2	30	2
1992	NYG	16	16	27	357	13.2	29	2
1993	NYG	16	16	21	272	13.0	32	**5**
1994	NYG	16	16	**31**	**364**	11.7	**40**	4
1995	NYG	15	15	18	197	10.9	26	0
1996	NYG	16	16	22	178	8.1	19	1
1997	NYG	16	16	21	150	7.1	26	2
1998	NYG	16	16	13	90	6.9	22	0
1999	NYG	16	15	9	55	6.1	12	0
2000	NYG	16	11	4	30	7.5	18	0
2001	NYG	16	6	1	5	5.0	5	0
Career		207	171	201	2,194	10.9	40	17

=== Playoffs ===
Year	Team	Games		Receiving				
Year	Team	GP	GS	Rec	Yds	Avg	Lng	TD
1989	NYG	1	0	0	0	0.0	0	0
1990	NYG	3	1	**5**	**44**	8.8	13	**1**
1993	NYG	2	2	4	43	**10.8**	**23**	0
1997	NYG	1	1	0	0	0.0	0	0
2000	NYG	3	1	1	7	7.0	7	0
Career		10	5	10	94	9.4	23	1

== Post-playing career ==
After retiring from football in 2002, Cross moved into broadcasting. He has co-hosted the YES Network's This Week in Football, as well as serving as color commentator alongside John Sterling on the network's Ivy League football telecasts. Cross is also a sideline reporter for the New York Giants Radio Network as well as an analyst on Giants First and 10. He has spent a great deal of time working with youth to help ensure that they stay in school. He currently resides in Northern New Jersey and is a commercial real estate broker in NY/NJ for Cushman & Wakefield; where he works closely with Global Chairman Bruce Mosler. His son, Howard Cross III, plays for the Cincinnati Bengals, and his daughter, Bella Cross, attends The University of Alabama Honors College.
