= Hezekiah Wagstaff =

American political consultant (1951–2016)

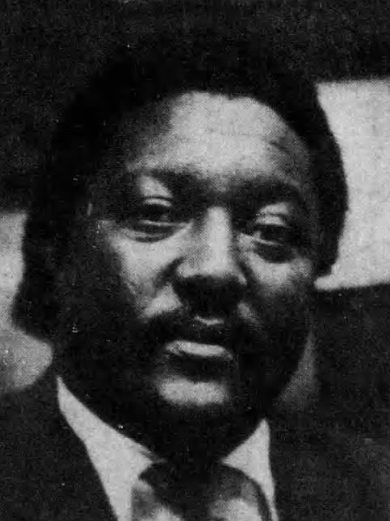
- Wagstaff in 1985

Assistant Press Secretary to the Governor of Alabama
- In office January 30, 1983 – November 14, 1985 (Note: Wagstaff officially left office on November 14. He was fired on October 28 and had been on paid leave for his final weeks in office.)
- Governor: George Wallace
- Press Secretary: Billy Joe Camp
- Succeeded by: Frank Mastin Jr.

Personal details
- Born: February 3, 1951 Uniontown, Alabama, U.S.
- Died: July 7, 2016 (aged 65) Alabama, U.S.
- Party: Democratic
- Education: Alabama A&M University

Hezekiah Wagstaff (February 3, 1951 - July 7, 2016) was an American political consultant and activist from the state of Alabama. A member of the Democratic Party, he is most known for having served as Governor George Wallace's assistant press secretary from 1983 until his dismissal in 1985. Wagstaff was replaced by Montgomery reporter Frank Mastin Jr. after a series of scandals and criticism of Governor Wallace.

== Biography ==
In the 1970s, Wagstaff was the Alabama director of the Emergency Land Fund, a privately owned non-profit organization founded in 1971 to prevent the loss of minority-owned land to banks and corporations. While working as a political consultant in 1980, he befriended Billy Joe Camp, then campaigning to become a commissioner on the Alabama Public Service Commission. Upon Camp's election, Wagstaff became his administrative assistant.

He became embroiled in controversy in 1982 for submitting a $393.95 meal and accommodation expense voucher despite meals being included in a convention registration fee. A district attorney subpoenaed records, and Wagstaff repaid $186 to the state.

Governor George Wallace appointed Wagstaff as assistant press secretary on January 30, 1983, upon Camp's recommendation. In September 1984, it was revealed he had been convicted of driving without a license in 1980, 1981, and 1982, with his license suspended since 1977 for speeding. On October 28, 1985, he was fired after accusing Governor Wallace of covering up disputes and attempting to transfer to the Alabama Office of Minority Affairs.

== Personal life ==
Wagstaff married Altress Faye Rice on June 18, 1979, in Montgomery, Alabama. In 1986 Rice accused Wagstaff of stabbing and beating her, leading him to be charged with third degree assault. In 1993, he served jail time for writing bad checks.
