= Patrick Ragland =

American politician

16th Secretary of State of Alabama
- In office 1872–1873
- Governor: David P. Lewis
- Preceded by: Jabez J. Parker
- Succeeded by: Neander H. Rice

Personal details
- Party: Republican

Patrick Ragland served as the 16th Secretary of State of Alabama from 1872 to 1873.

Before Ragland was Secretary of State, he was librarian of the Alabama Supreme Court Library from 1868 to 1872.
