= Fred Crawford (Alabama politician) =

American politician

46th Secretary of State of Alabama
- In office 1989
- Governor: H. Guy Hunt
- Preceded by: Glen Browder
- Succeeded by: Perry Hand

Personal details
- Party: Republican

Fred Crawford was appointed Alabama's 46th Secretary of State in 1989 and became the first Republican Secretary of State of Alabama since Reconstruction.

Crawford served as National President of the University of Montevallo's Alumni Association and on the Alumni Board. He also has been on the Board of the American Village, Advisory Board for the Michael E. Stevens College of Business, Alabama Council of Association Management, the USS Alabama Battleship Memorial Park and other organizations.

Crawford is an alumnus of the University of Montevallo, then known as Alabama College, where he graduated in 1968 with a Bachelor of Science.
