= Bill Nichols (politician) =

U.S. representative

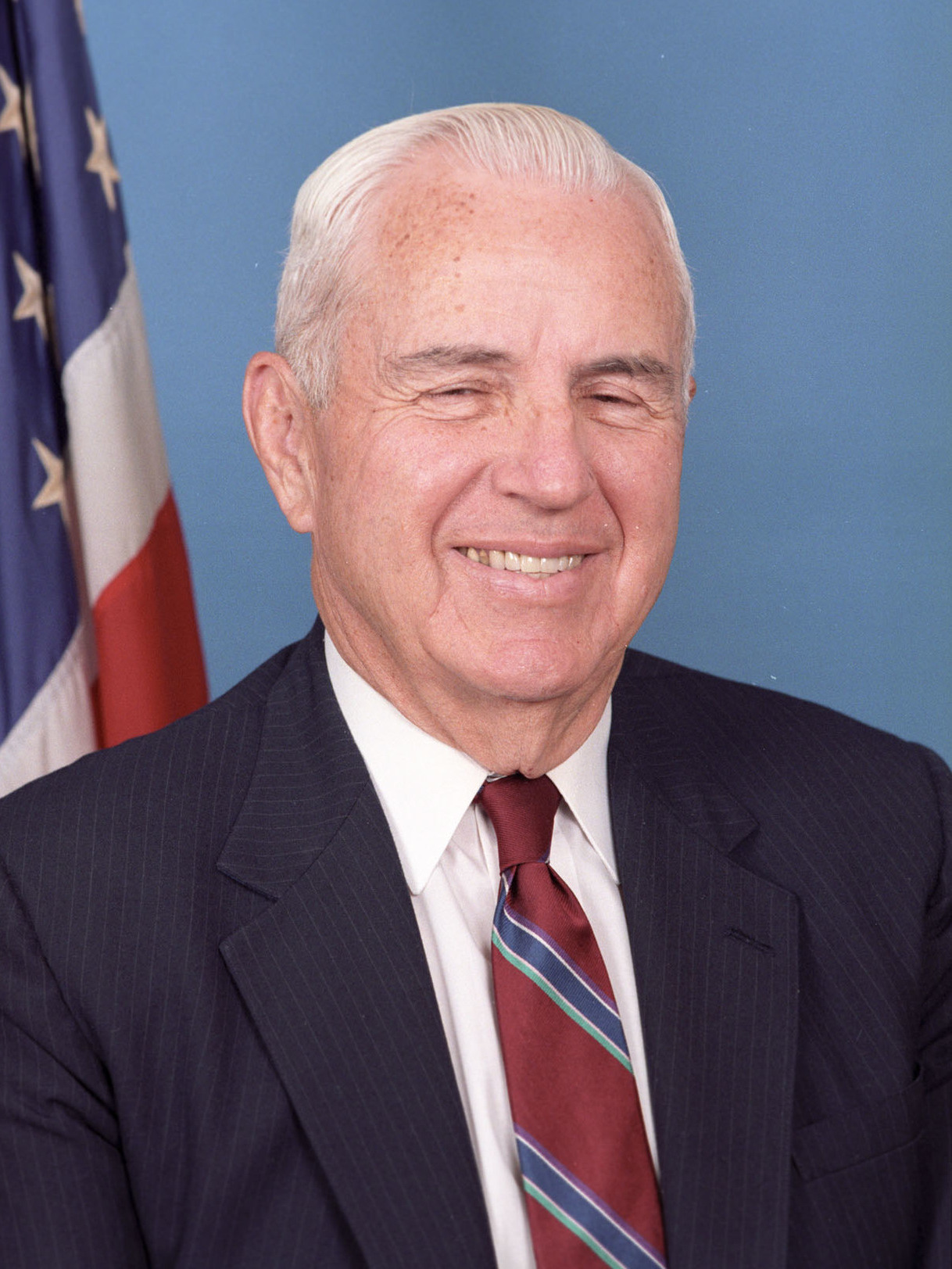
- Official portrait, 1986

Member of the U.S. House of Representatives from Alabama
- In office January 3, 1967 – December 13, 1988
- Preceded by: Glenn Andrews (4th); Elizabeth B. Andrews (3rd)
- Succeeded by: Tom Bevill (4th); Glen Browder (3rd)
- Constituency: 4th district (1967–1973); 3rd district (1973–1988)

Member of the Alabama Senate from the 8th district
- In office November 7, 1962 – November 9, 1966

Member of the Alabama House of Representatives
- In office November 5, 1958 – November 7, 1962

Personal details
- Born: William Flynt Nichols; October 16, 1918 Monroe County, Mississippi, U.S.
- Died: December 13, 1988 (aged 70) Washington, D.C., U.S.
- Party: Democratic
- Spouse: Maude Carolyn Funderburk (m. 1943)
- Children: 3
- Education: Auburn University (BS, MS)

Military service
- Allegiance: United States
- Branch/service: United States Army
- Years of service: 1942–1947
- Rank: Captain
- Unit: 8th Infantry Division
- Battles/wars: Battle of Hürtgen Forest (WIA)
- Awards: Bronze Star; Purple Heart

William Flynt Nichols (October 16, 1918 – December 13, 1988) was an American politician. A member of the Democratic Party, he served in the United States House of Representatives for Alabama's 4th congressional district from 1967 to 1973 and Alabama's 3rd congressional district from 1973 until his death in 1988.

== Life ==
Nichols was born on October 16, 1918. On January 30, 1942, Nichols married Maude Carolyn Funderburk. He was a Methodist, having served on the Board of Stewards of Sylacauga's First Methodist Church.

Nichols died of a heart attack on December 13, 1988.

== Education ==
Nichols received a bachelor's degree in Agriculture in 1939 from the Alabama Polytechnic Institute (now Auburn University) and a master's degree in Agronomy from the same institution in 1941.

== Military service ==
Nichols enlisted in the United States Army in 1942 and served five years in the European Theatre. He was wounded at the Battle of Hürtgen Forest, losing a leg in a land mine explosion. He was awarded the Bronze Star Medal and the Purple Heart, and retired with the rank of Captain in 1947. Following his retirement, he lived in Sylacauga, Alabama, where he is also buried.

== Business career ==
After military service, Nichols was employed by the Parker Fertilizer Company, and would later become president of the associated Parker Gin Company.

== Politics ==
=== Service in the Alabama Legislature ===
Prior to his congressional service, he served over an eight-year period in both houses of the Alabama Legislature, having been elected to the Alabama House of Representatives in 1958 and the Alabama Senate in 1962.

=== Congressional service ===
Nichols was elected to congress in 1966 and was reelected each year until his death in 1988.

In 1986, with retiring Republican U.S. Senator Barry Goldwater of Arizona, Nichols co-authored the Goldwater–Nichols Act, the far-reaching reorganization of the United States Department of Defense command structure.

Nichols voted for the Abandoned Shipwrecks Act of 1987. The Act asserts United States title to certain abandoned shipwrecks located on or embedded in submerged lands under state jurisdiction, and transfers title to the respective state, thereby empowering states to manage these cultural and historical resources more efficiently, with the goal of preventing treasure hunters and salvagers from damaging them. President Ronald Reagan signed it into law on April 28, 1988.

== See also ==
- List of members of the United States Congress who died in office (1950–1999)

U.S. House of Representatives
Preceded by Glenn Andrews	Member of the U.S. House of Representatives from Alabama's 4th congressional district 1967–1973	Succeeded by Tom Bevill
Preceded by Elizabeth B. Andrews	Member of the U.S. House of Representatives from Alabama's 3rd congressional district 1973–1988	Succeeded by Glen Browder
