= William W. Screws =

American politician

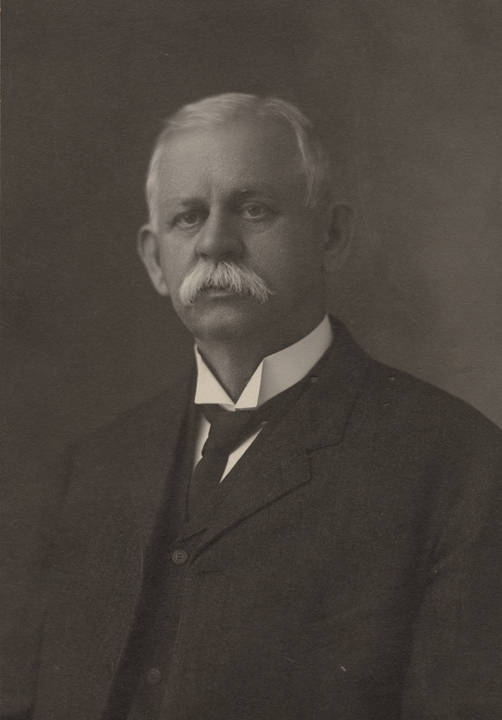

19th Secretary of State of Alabama
- In office 1878–1882
- Governor: Rufus W. Cobb
- Preceded by: Rufus King Boyd
- Succeeded by: Ellis Phelan

Personal details
- Born: February 25, 1839
- Died: August 7, 1913 (aged 74)
- Party: Democratic

William Wallace Screws (1839–1913) served as the 19th Secretary of State of Alabama from 1878 to 1882.

== Biography ==
He was born on February 25, 1839, at Jernigan, Barbour, now Russell County, Alabama to Benjamin Screws and Mourning Jones Drake.

He received his education in the village schools in Glenville, Alabama until he was sixteen. He did not go to college and instead read law under Thomas H. Watts. He was admitted to the Montgomery County Bar on June 15, 1859, and entered the practice of law.

== Civil War ==
He opposed the secession but enlisted as a volunteer into Hilliard's Alabama Legion at the outbreak of the American Civil War. He served in Tennessee and Kentucky and took part in the Battle of Chickamauga. In November 1963 he was commissioned as the first lieutenant in the 59th Alabama Infantry Regiment. Screws ended the war as major serving on the staff of Gen. James T. Holtzclaw. He published letters from the front in the Montgomery Advertiser describing his war experiences.

== Later life ==
After the war Montgomery Advertiser publisher Samuel Graham Reid, Sr., hired Screws as an associate editor in July 1865 and then in November of the same year sold him a half interest in the newspaper. For the next forty-eight years Screws maintained to a varying degree an editorial connection with the Advertiser.

In 1878–1882, he served as the Secretary of State of Alabama.

Screws received an honorary degree from the University of Alabama in 1906.

He died August 7, 1913, at Coosada, Alabama.

Governor Thomas G. Jones pronounced in his eulogy for William W. Screws the following,

No man ever lived in Alabama who labored more unselfishly for the good of the State or set a finer example in his career of devotion to the things that make for the uplift of man. His convictions always marked out his pathway, whether it was followed by few or many, and he never hesitated to differ with and argue against the opinions of the majority, if he felt them wrong or believed that their success would not redound to the good of society. He felt that his position as the head of a great newspaper was a sacred trust, and not a mere personal possession.

== Family ==
On April 25, 1867, he married Emily Frances and they had four children.
