= Beth Chapman (politician) =

American politician from Alabama

51st Secretary of State of Alabama
- In office January 15, 2007 – July 31, 2013
- Governor: Bob Riley; Robert J. Bentley
- Preceded by: Nancy Worley
- Succeeded by: James R. Bennett

38th Auditor of Alabama
- In office January 20, 2003 – January 15, 2007
- Governor: Don Siegelman; Bob Riley
- Preceded by: Susan Parker
- Succeeded by: Samantha Shaw

Personal details
- Born: Beth Killough; April 6, 1962 (age 64) Greenville, Alabama
- Party: Republican
- Spouse: James Chapman (died 2011)
- Children: 2
- Education: Fort Dale Academy; University of Montevallo; University of Alabama at Birmingham

Beth Killough Chapman (born April 6, 1962) is an American politician from Alabama. A member of the Republican Party, she served as the state's 51st secretary of state from 2007 until she resigned on July 31, 2013 in order to accept a position with the Alabama Farmers Federation.

== Early life ==
Beth Killough was born in Greenville, Alabama. Following graduation from Fort Dale Academy, she earned a B.S. from the University of Montevallo, and a master's degree from the University of Alabama at Birmingham.

== Political career ==
From 1995 to 1996, Chapman served as Appointments Secretary in the Cabinet of Governor Fob James, becoming the first woman to serve in that post. During the 2000 presidential election season, she served as a delegate pledged to George W. Bush at the Republican National Convention in Philadelphia, and as a member of Alabama's delegation to the Electoral College later that year. Following a stint in the private sector, she served as Press Secretary for Lieutenant Governor Steve Windom from 2000 to 2001.

Resigning from Lt. Governor Windom's staff in November 2001, she entered the 2002 race for State Auditor of Alabama, scoring an upset victory in the Republican primary, before winning the general election, capturing a seat previously held by Democrat Susan Parker. She served as State Auditor from 2003 to 2007. She was elected as Secretary of State in November 2006, defeating incumbent Nancy Worley by a margin of 57% to 43%. She assumed that office in January 2007. Chapman was mentioned as a possible candidate for Governor of Alabama in the 2010 election.

In early 2008, Chapman became the subject of attacks by Mark Montiel, a Republican former judge. Montiel sought to have the Alabama Ethics Commission and the Attorney General review tens of thousands of dollars paid by Chapman's 2006 campaign to her husband and sons. Attorney General Troy King, a fellow Republican, announced the complaint against Chapman does not appear to raise any violations of the law. He also wrote that state law does not prohibit a candidate from hiring family members to work in a campaign. Chapman was cleared by the Ethics Commission on the complaint.

In May 2008, Chapman again made headlines when an Associated Press story revealed that Chapman's personal consulting firm was paid nearly $50,000 annually by a private charity that receives funding from the state government. Democratic critics attacked Chapman, and Alabama Republicans generally, for engaging in such deals while attacking Democratic legislators holding state jobs. Chapman denied wrongdoing, and stated that the charity's funds paid to her firm come from fundraising, not its state grants. The Birmingham News, which had endorsed Chapman in her 2006 campaign, rejected these arguments and sharply criticized her over the issue.

On April 6, 2009, Chapman announced she would seek reelection as Alabama Secretary of State in 2010, and was successful in her bid.

== Lobbying career ==
In 2025, surveillance company Flock Safety hired Chapman as a lobbyist.

== Personal life ==
In 1988, Killough married James Chapman, with whom she has two sons, Taylor and Thatcher. Her husband, James Chapman died on April 3, 2011, of acute respiratory distress syndrome (ARDS) at the age of 50. The family lives in Hoover, Alabama.

Party political offices
Preceded by Pat Duncan	Republican nominee for State Auditor of Alabama; 2002	Succeeded by Samantha Shaw
Preceded by Dave Thomas	Republican nominee for Secretary of State of Alabama; 2006, 2010	Succeeded by John Merrill
Political offices
Preceded by Nancy Worley	Secretary of State of Alabama; 2007–2013	Succeeded by James R. Bennett
