= Thomas B. Tunstall =

American politician

6th Secretary of State of Alabama
- In office 1836–1840
- Governor: Clement Comer Clay; Hugh McVay; Arthur P. Bagby
- Preceded by: Edmund A. Webster
- Succeeded by: William Garrett

Personal details
- Born: 1788
- Died: 1842 (aged 53–54)

Thomas B. Tunstall (1788–1842) served as the sixth Secretary of State of Alabama from 1836 to 1840.

In addition, he served as clerk of the Alabama House of Representatives.
