= Louina, Alabama =

Unincorporated community in Alabama, United States

Louina
- Unincorporated community
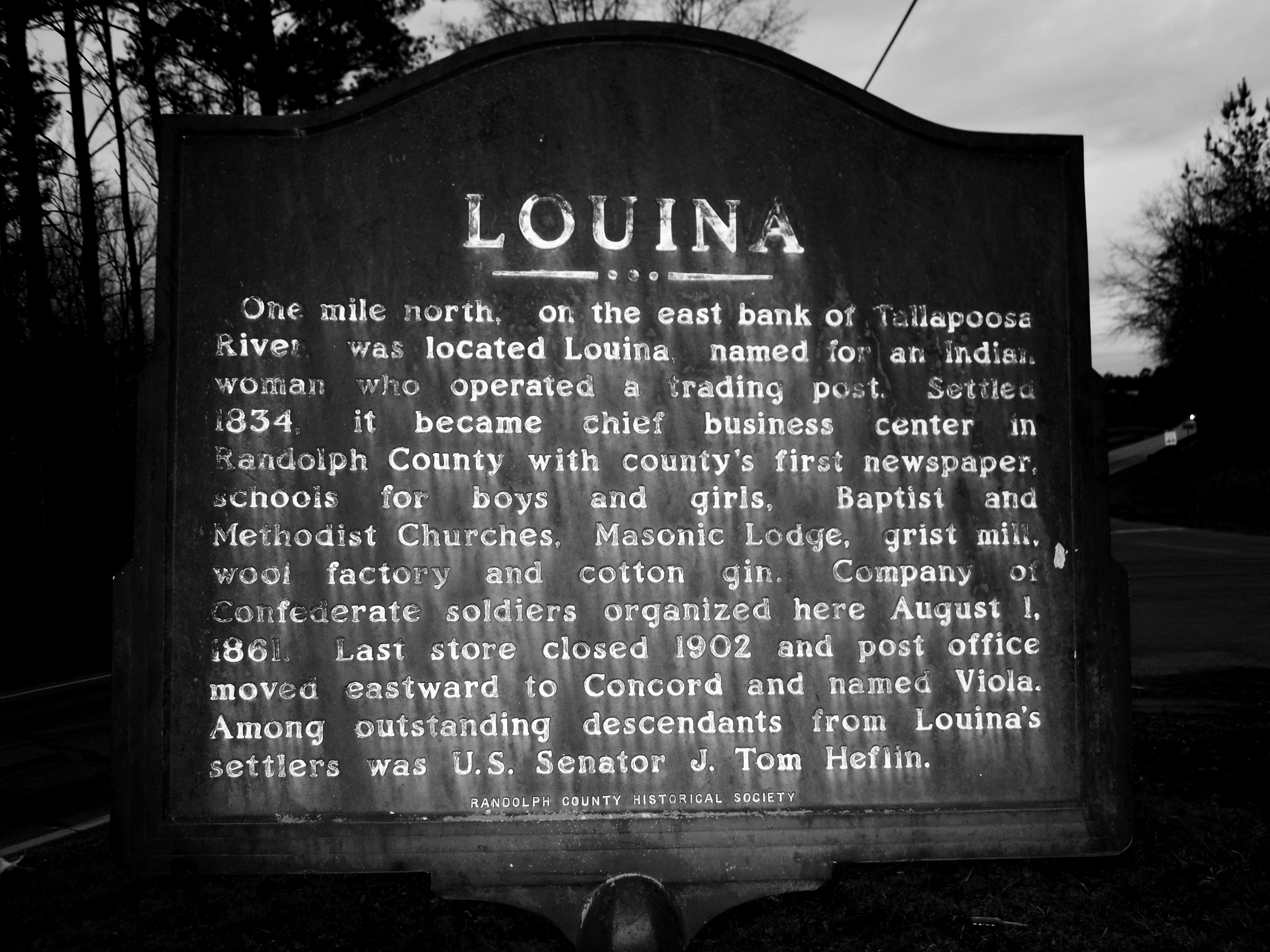

- Location in Alabama.
- Coordinates: 33°07′28″N 85°33′08″W
- Country: United States
- State: Alabama
- County: Randolph
- Elevation: 682 ft (208 m)
- Time zone: UTC-6 (Central (CST))
  - Summer (DST): UTC-5 (CDT)
- Area code: 334
- GNIS feature ID: 156631

Louina, sometimes Ole Louina, is a ghost town located 14 miles west of Roanoke and about one mile east of Wadley in Randolph County, Alabama, United States.

== History ==
Ole Louina was a community during early settlement of Randolph County which was settled after the Battle of Horseshoe Bend in 1814 when the Creek Indians were defeated by General Andrew Jackson.

The town was founded in 1834 and lasted until about 1905, and at one time was largest town in Randolph County with two churches, several stores, and a gristmill.

== Demographics ==
Historical population
Census	Pop.	Note	%±
1880	148		—
U.S. Decennial Census

Louina appeared on the 1880 U.S. Census with a population of 148 residents. It was the only time it appeared on census rolls.

== Notable person ==
- James Thomas Heflin, a leading proponent of white supremacy who served as a Democratic Congressman and United States Senator

== Gallery ==
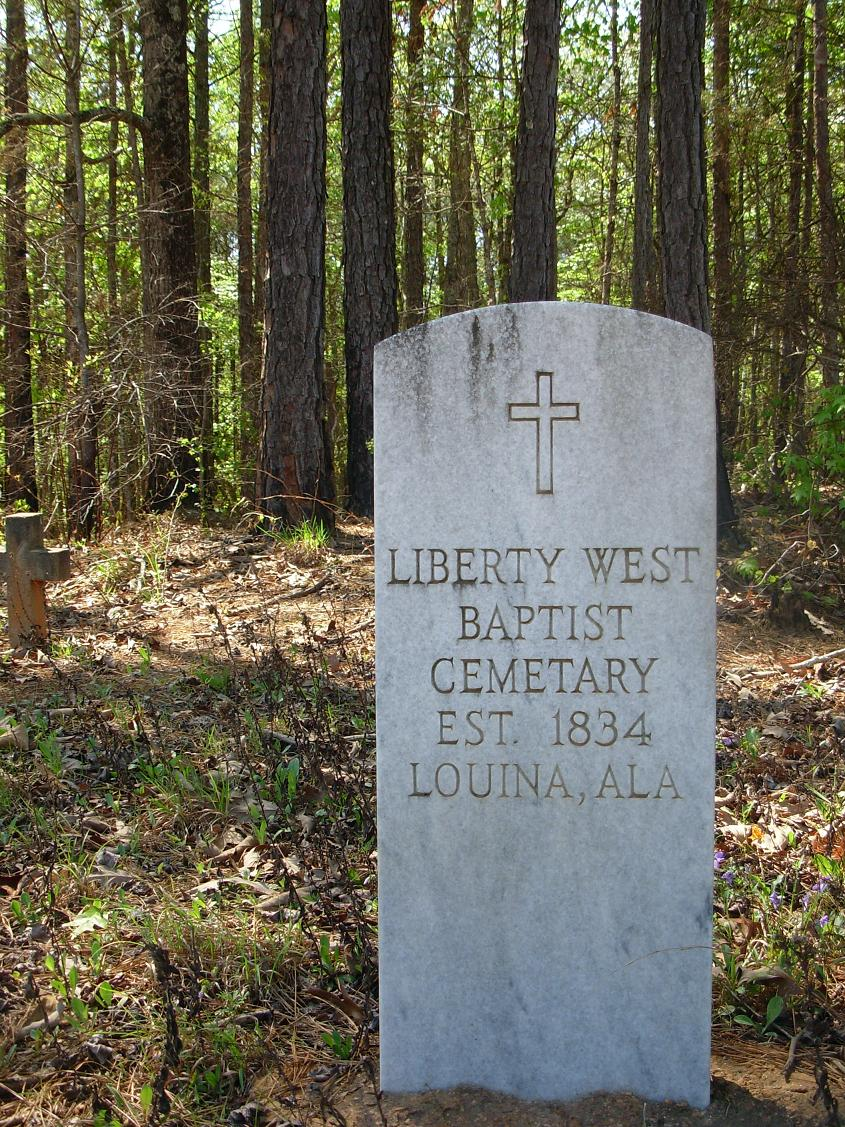
The "Liberty West Baptist Cemetery" is one of the last remaining vestiges of Louina, Alabama.

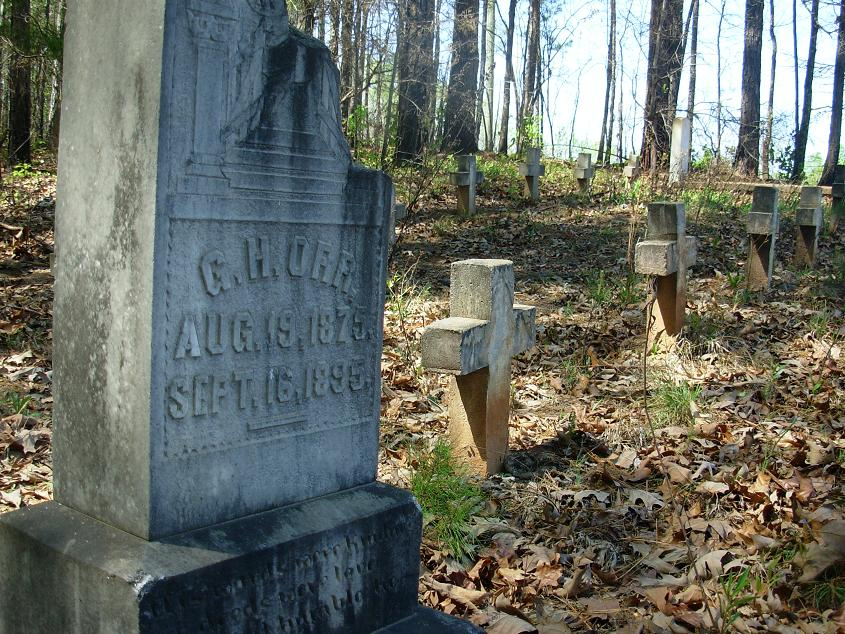

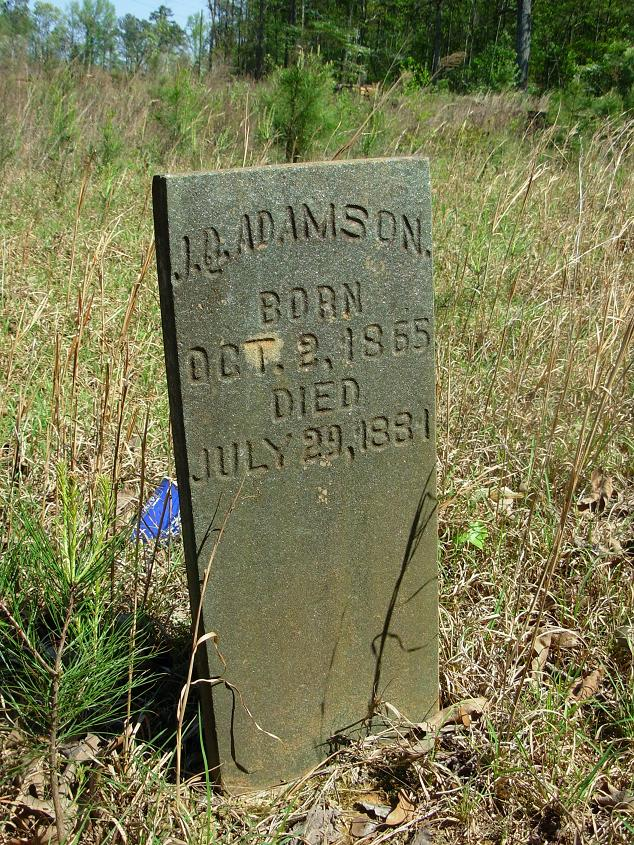

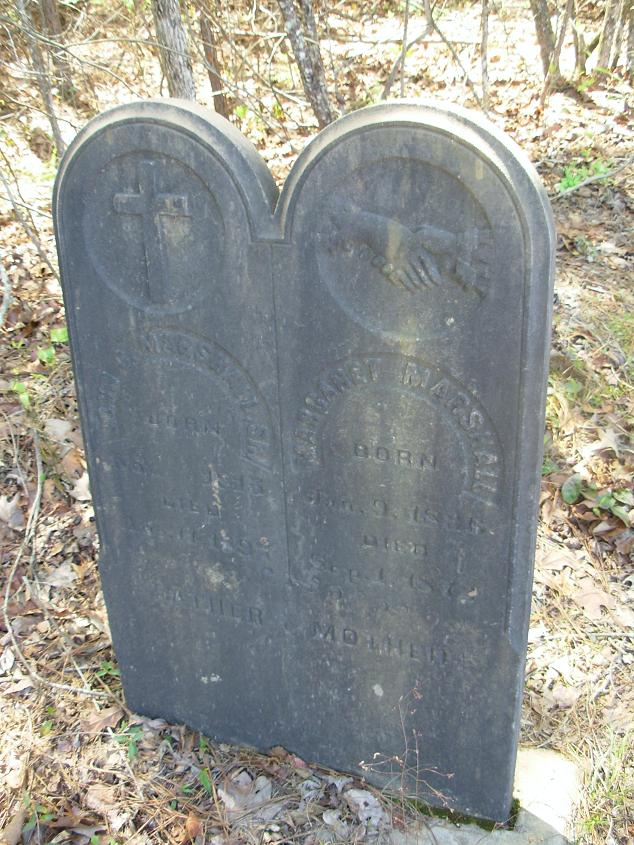

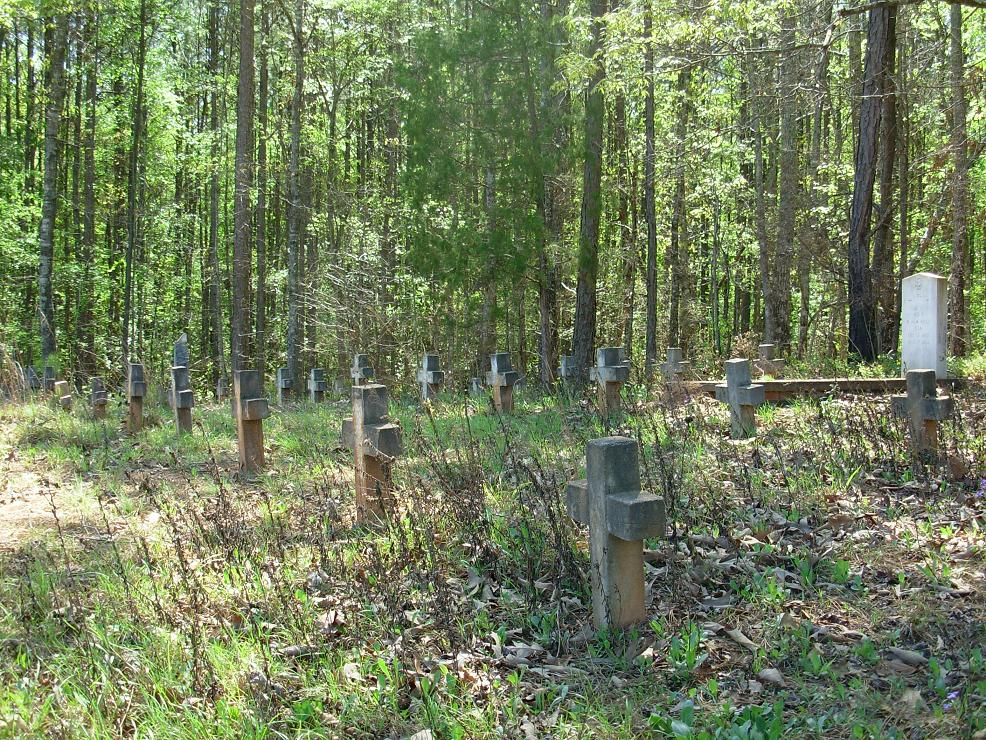

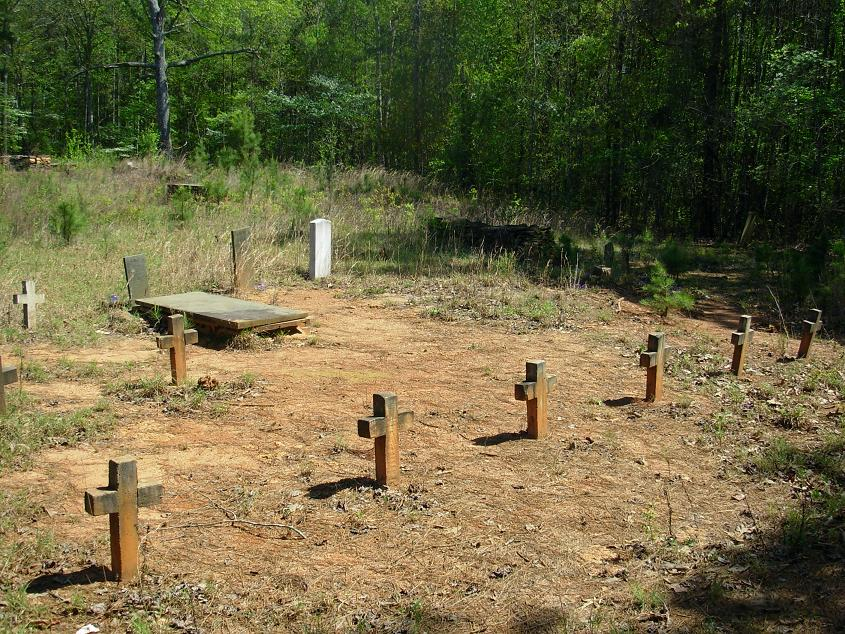

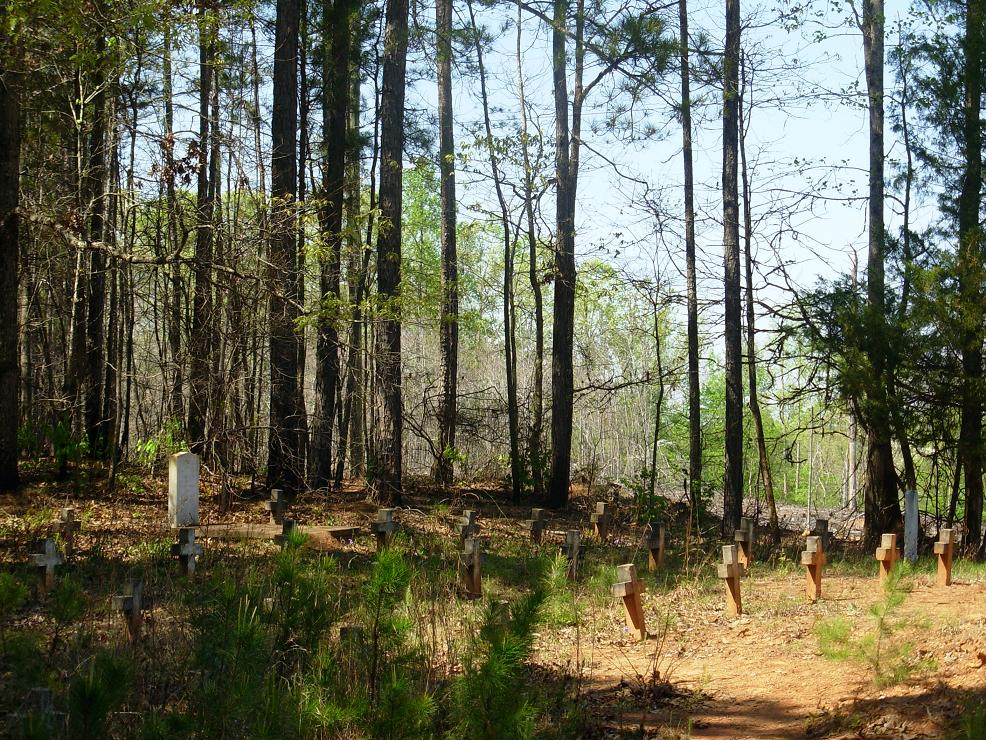
