= Micah Taul (Alabama politician) =

American politician

13th Secretary of State of Alabama
- In office 1867–1868
- Governor: Robert M. Patton; Wager Swayne
- Preceded by: David D. Dalton
- Succeeded by: Charles A. Miller

Personal details
- Born: November 25, 1832
- Died: February 13, 1873 (aged 40)
- Party: Democratic

Micah Taul (November 25, 1832 – February 13, 1873) served as the 13th Secretary of State of Alabama from 1867 to 1868.

Taul was Secretary of the Alabama State Senate from 1856 to 1857. He was also a member of the Alabama Railroad Commission and served until he died in 1873.

He got married in 1854 and had two children.
