= Charles A. Miller (Alabama politician) =

American politician

14th Secretary of State of Alabama
- In office 1868–1870
- Governor: William Hugh Smith
- Preceded by: Micah Taul
- Succeeded by: Jabez J. Parker

Personal details
- Party: Republican

Charles A. Miller served as the 14th Secretary of State of Alabama from 1868 to 1870.
