= James H. Weaver (Alabama politician) =

American politician

9th Secretary of State of Alabama
- In office 1856–1860
- Governor: John A. Winston; Andrew B. Moore
- Preceded by: Vincent M. Benham
- Succeeded by: Patrick Henry Brittan

James H. Weaver was an American politician who served as the ninth Secretary of State of Alabama from 1856 to 1860.

In addition to serving as Secretary of State, he served for a term as Sheriff of Coosa County, Alabama and was elected to the Alabama House of Representatives in 1853.
