= Charles C. Langdon =

21st Secretary of State of Alabama, U.S.

21st Secretary of State of Alabama
- In office 1885–1890
- Governor: Edward A. O'Neal; Thomas Seay
- Preceded by: Ellis Phelan
- Succeeded by: Joseph D. Barron

Personal details
- Party: Democratic

Charles C. Langdon served as the 21st Secretary of State of Alabama from 1885 to 1890.

Langdon was appointed Secretary of State in 1885 and was elected for a full term in 1896. He was elected to the Alabama State Legislature three times and a member of two Constitutional Conventions.

He got married in 1829 and had a total of five children. When he got back from the war, his wife had died from some disease.
