= Rufus King Boyd =

American politician

18th Secretary of State of Alabama
- In office 1874–1878
- Governor: George S. Houston
- Preceded by: Neander H. Rice
- Succeeded by: William W. Screws

Personal details
- Born: 1831 Williamson County, Tennessee
- Died: May 10, 1883 (aged 51–52) Guntersville, Alabama
- Party: Democratic

Rufus King Boyd (1831 – May 10, 1883) served as the 18th Secretary of State of Alabama from 1874 to 1878.

In December 1865, Boyd relocated to Guntersville, Alabama and formed a law firm with Louis Wyeth, a judge, under the name of Wyeth & Boyd.

He got married in 1866.
