= David D. Dalton =

American politician

12th Secretary of State of Alabama
- In office 1865–1867
- Governor: Robert M. Patton
- Preceded by: Albert Stanhope Elmore
- Succeeded by: Micah Taul (Alabama politician)

Personal details
- Born: December 31, 1822
- Died: November 13, 1894 (aged 71)
- Party: Democratic

David Louis Dalton (December 31, 1822 – November 13, 1894) served as the 12th Secretary of State of Alabama from 1865 to 1867.

After his tenure as Secretary of State, he served as private secretary to Governor William Hugh Smith from 1868 to 1870 and as a clerk in the Alabama Department of Education.

He married his second wife Kate Louisa Darby (1822-1901) in June 1845, and had two children.
