= New Hope High School (New Hope, Alabama) =

Public high school in New Hope, Alabama, United States

Location
- 5216 Main Drive; New Hope, Alabama 35760; United States; 34°32′24″N 86°24′13″W

Information
- Funding type: Public
- School district: Madison County Schools
- Superintendent: Kenneth Kubik
- CEEB code: 011975
- Principal: Bryan Gustafson
- Teaching staff: 37.16 (FTE)
- Grades: 9th – 12th
- Enrollment: 605 (2023-2024)
- Student to teacher ratio: 16.28
- Colors: Red, blue, and white
- Mascot: Indians
- Website: newhopehighschool.mcssk12.org

New Hope High School (NHHS) is located in New Hope, Alabama, United States. It is part of the Madison County Schools system. The current principal is Bryan Gustafson. Enrollment as of the end of the 2025 school year is 605 students in grades 7–12.

== Sport programs ==
- Baseball
- Soccer
- Basketball
- Softball
- Cheerleading
- Football
- Golf
- Marching band
- Volleyball
- Color Guard
- Wrestling
- Cross Country
- Tennis
A panorama view of New Hope High School's football field

== Clubs ==
- Future Business Leaders of America (FBLA)
- Fellowship of Christian Students (FCS)
- Future Farmers of America (FFA)
- Anchor Club
- Student Government Association (SGA)
- Yearbook Staff
- Fine Arts Club
- Family, Community, and Career Leaders of America (FCCLA)
- National Honor Society

== Notable alumni ==
- Howard Cross, class of 1985, former professional tight end in the NFL
- Nancy Worley, class of 1969, former Alabama Secretary of State Alabama State Government
- Rudy Ford, class of 2013, safety for the Green Bay Packers
- Ashton Quattlebaum, class of 2017, Wrestling coach for the new hope indians, he is also known as the greatest coach of the new hope wrestling program ever.
