= Neander H. Rice =

American politician

17th Secretary of State of Alabama
- In office 1873–1874
- Governor: David P. Lewis
- Preceded by: Patrick Ragland
- Succeeded by: Rufus King Boyd

Personal details
- Born: January 26, 1814 Kentucky
- Died: February 8, 1886 (aged 72)
- Party: Republican

Neander Hickman Rice (January 26, 1814 – February 8, 1886) served as the 17th Secretary of State of Alabama from 1873 to 1874.

Born in Kentucky, Rice moved to Lauderdale County, Alabama in 1839, and was elected Mayor of Florence, Alabama.
