= Ellis Phelan =

American politician (1843–1897)

20th Secretary of State of Alabama
- In office 1882–1885
- Governor: Edward A. O'Neal
- Preceded by: William W. Screws
- Succeeded by: Charles C. Langdon

Personal details
- Born: August 11, 1843
- Died: August 5, 1897 (aged 53)
- Party: Democratic

Ellis Phelan (1843–1897) served as the 20th Secretary of State of Alabama from 1882 to 1885.

Phelan graduated from the University of Alabama then entered the Confederate States Army. He was clerk of the Alabama House of Representatives from 1870 to 1877 and in 1890, he was elected circuit judge.

He married his first wife in 1870 and married his second wife in 1884.
