= Asbury Automotive Group =

Car dealership corporation

- Company type: Public
- Traded as: NYSE: ABG; S&P 600 component
- Industry: Auto dealership
- Founded: 1995; 31 years ago
- Headquarters: Duluth, Georgia, U.S.
- Key people: David W Hult, CEO; Dan Clara, SVP of Operations; Michael Welch, CFO
- Products: New and used vehicles
- Revenue: ▲US$9.8 billion (2021)
- Operating income: ▲US$791.8 million (2021)
- Net income: ▲US$532.4 million (2021)
- Total assets: ▲US$8,002.6 million (2021)
- Total equity: ▲US$314.5 million (2021)
- Number of employees: 14,200 (2021)
- Website: www.asburyauto.com

Asbury Automotive Group is an American company based in the Atlanta area that operates auto dealerships in various parts of the United States. Founded in 1995, it was ranked No. 242 on the 2025 Fortune 500 list.

With 148 dealerships and 198 franchises representing 31 American, European, and Asian brands, it is the third largest automotive retailer in the United States as of March 2022.

== History ==
Asbury Automotive was formed in 1995 by Tom Gibson, a former vice president with Subaru of America. One of the company's original moves was to form a joint venture with Atlanta-based dealer Jim Nalley before acquiring his 11 dealerships outright in 1997. Nalley oversaw the stores until his retirement in 2004; his sons currently own dealerships across Alabama, Georgia, and Tennessee.

Eventually, Asbury would expand out of the Atlanta area, adding St. Louis–based Plaza Motors while acquiring David McDavid's Texas dealerships, and later the Jacksonville, Florida.–based Coggin Automotive and Tampa, Florida–based Courtesy Automotive in 1998. A joint venture with the North Carolina–based Crown Automotive Group in 1999 saw Asbury eventually take full ownership of those dealerships, while moving into South Carolina with its outright purchase of the Greenville Automotive Group in 2010. It would also purchase dealerships across Arkansas, Mississippi, and Oregon before later divesting to focus on core markets.

Throughout the latter portion of the 2010s and early 2020s, under CEO David Hult, Asbury expanded rapidly, moving into the Indianapolis market with its purchase of Hare Automotive and the Bill Estes Automotive Group in 2017 and 2019, respectively. It would also make several single-point purchases to expand its reach across the area, including Terry Lee Honda in Avon, Ind. (renamed Hare Honda) in 2018 and Kahlo Chrysler Dodge Jeep Ram in Noblesville, Ind. in 2019.

In December 2019, Asbury agreed to buy Texas-based Park Place Dealerships, a collection of luxury vehicle dealerships in the Dallas/Fort Worth area, for $1 billion. On March 24, 2020, the deal was canceled amid concerns due to the COVID-19 pandemic. However, a modified deal was reached on July 6 of that year which closed on August 24.

In December 2020, Asbury unveiled Clicklane, an online new and used vehicle retailing platform. The company rolled out the platform across its existing dealership base while announcing intents to utilize the brand in markets in which it did not currently own stores.

On September 29, 2021, Asbury purchased the Utah-based Larry H. Miller Dealerships for $3.2 billion, along with its Total Care Auto (TCA) vehicle protection plan business. The company divested seven Toyota and Lexus dealerships due to manufacturer guidelines. Asbury announced plans to roll out TCA to its non-Larry H. Miller "legacy" stores, while in a similar fashion integrating the Clicklane platform to the Larry H. Miller dealerships.

In December 2021, Asbury acquired Stevinson Automotive Group in the Denver, Colorado, area.

In December 2022, Asbury divested from its nine Crown Automotive Group locations in Greensboro, Durham, and Fayetteville North Carolina. The locations were sold to South Carolina-based Hudson Automotive Group and included BMW, Honda, Volvo, Nissan, Ford, and Chrysler franchises.

In September 2023, Asbury Automotive acquired Jim Koons automotive dealership group for about $1.2 billion.

== Divisions ==
Name	Locations served
Arapahoe Hyundai	Denver, Colorado (Centennial)
Bill Estes Auto Group	Indianapolis, Indiana (Brownsburg, Lebanon)
Coggin Automotive	Jacksonville, Orlando, Deland, Port St. Lucie, St. Augustine, Florida
Courtesy Automotive	Tampa Bay, Florida (Brandon, Palm Harbor, Tampa)
Crown Automotive	Richmond, Virginia
David McDavid	Dallas/Fort Worth, Austin, Texas
Greenville Automotive	Greenville, South Carolina
Hare Automotive	Indianapolis, Indiana (Noblesville)
Herb Chambers Auto Group	Massachusetts and Rhode Island
Kahlo Chrysler Jeep Dodge Ram	Indianapolis, Indiana (Noblesville)
Larry H. Miller Dealerships	Phoenix, Arizona; Tucson, Arizona; Southern California; Denver, Colorado; Boise, Idaho; Albuquerque, New Mexico; Salt Lake City, Utah; Spokane, Washington
Mike Shaw Chrysler Jeep Dodge Ram	Denver, Colorado (Greeley)
Mike Shaw Subaru	Denver, Colorado (Greeley, Thornton)
Nalley Automotive	Atlanta, Georgia (Alpharetta, Cumming, Decatur, Lithonia, Marietta, Roswell, Smyrna, Union City)
Park Place Dealerships	Dallas/Fort Worth, Texas
Plaza Motors	St. Louis, Missouri (Creve Coeur, O'Fallon)
Stevinson Automotive	Denver, Colorado (Aurora, Lakewood, Littleton, Longmont)

== See also ==
- List of S&P 600 companies
