= William Garrett (Alabama politician) =

American politician (1809–??)

7th Secretary of State of Alabama
- In office 1840–1852
- Governor: Arthur P. Bagby; Benjamin Fitzpatrick; Joshua L. Martin; Reuben Chapman; Henry W. Collier
- Preceded by: Thomas B. Tunstall
- Succeeded by: Vincent M. Benham

Personal details
- Born: May 6, 1809
- Died: Unknown
- Party: Democratic

William Garrett served as the seventh Secretary of State of Alabama from 1840 to 1852.

In addition to his tenure as Secretary of State, he served as assistant clerk to the Alabama House of Representatives from 1838 to 1840 and was elected to the Alabama House of Representatives in 1853.

He first got married in 1830 to Tabitha Taylor. She died in 1835. He married his second wife 1843 and had five children.
