= Edmund A. Webster =

American politician

5th Secretary of State of Alabama
- In office 1834–1836
- Governor: John Gayle; Clement Comer Clay
- Preceded by: James I. Thornton
- Succeeded by: Thomas B. Tunstall

Edmund A. Webster was an American politician. He served as the fifth Secretary of State of Alabama from 1834 to 1836.
