= James K. Jackson =

Former Secretary of the Governor of Alabama (1894-1898)

23rd Secretary of State of Alabama
- In office 1894–1898
- Governor: William C. Oates; Joseph F. Johnston
- Preceded by: Joseph D. Barron
- Succeeded by: James Thomas Heflin

Personal details
- Party: Democratic

James Kirkman Jackson served as the 23rd Secretary of State of Alabama from 1894 to 1898. He was a member of the Alabama State Bar, but never practiced law. In 1883, he was appointed clerk of the Alabama Railroad Commission. He also served as Private Secretary to the Governor under three administrations.

He married in 1900 and had two children.
