= Patrick Henry Brittan =

American politician (1815–1868)

10th Secretary of State of Alabama
- In office 1860–1865
- Governor: Andrew B. Moore; John Gill Shorter; Thomas H. Watts
- Preceded by: James H. Weaver
- Succeeded by: Albert Stanhope Elmore

Personal details
- Born: September 21, 1815
- Died: March 18, 1868 (aged 52)
- Party: Democratic
- Spouse: Ora Williams (m. 1839)
- Children: 9

Patrick Henry Brittan (September 21, 1815 – March 18, 1868) was an American politician and newspaper publisher from Alabama. He served as Secretary of State of Alabama from 1860 to the end of the Civil War.

== Biography ==
Patrick Henry Brittan was born in Thornton Gap, Virginia on September 21, 1815.

He learned printing in Washington, D.C., and then migrated to Columbus, Georgia in 1839 to practice his trade. He married Ora Williams of Morgan County, Georgia in that same year. They would have nine children together. They moved to LaFayette, Alabama in 1843, where he established the LaFayette Tribune.

He relocated again in 1847 to Montgomery, Alabama, where he bought a half-interest in the Montgomery Advertiser. He maintained his interest in the paper throughout several partnerships. In 1853, the Advertiser became the first newspaper in the state to be published using a steam-powered printing press. He started another newspaper, the Montgomery Messenger, in 1856. It was a small daily that he merged with the Confederation in 1858, in a new joint venture with two other partners. It was in this year that his new home at 507 Columbus Street was completed. The Patrick Henry Brittan House is a historic Italianate style house in Montgomery. Completed in 1858, it was added to the National Register of Historic Places on December 13, 1979.

Brittan served as quartermaster general of Alabama from 1857 until 1859. In 1859, he was elected as the 10th Secretary of State of Alabama. He served in this capacity from 1860 until the end of the Civil War.

== Personal life ==
Brittan and his wife had nine children: Kate, Mary, Henry S., Emmett, Grattan, Lizzie B., Lucy, Sallie, and Belle. He died in Montgomery on March 18, 1868. Brittan was the uncle of the sculptor, William Randolph Barbee.

Political offices
Preceded by James H. Weaver	Secretary of State of Alabama; 1860–1865	Succeeded by Albert Stanhope Elmore
