= Albert Stanhope Elmore =

American politician

11th Secretary of State of Alabama
- In office 1865
- Governor: Lewis E. Parsons
- Preceded by: Patrick Henry Brittan
- Succeeded by: David D. Dalton

Personal details
- Born: June 12, 1827
- Died: June 11, 1909 (aged 81)

Albert Stanhope Elmore (1827–1909) served as the 11th Secretary of State of Alabama in 1865.

Before he was appointed Secretary of State, he was elected major of the State militia in 1847 and served as assistant clerk in the Alabama House of Representatives from 1853 to 1854 and from 1855 to 1864.

He got married in 1853 and had seven children.
