= Vincent M. Benham =

American politician

8th Secretary of State of Alabama
- In office 1852–1856
- Governor: Henry W. Collier; John A. Winston
- Preceded by: William Garrett
- Succeeded by: James H. Weaver

Personal details
- Born: Unknown
- Died: 1865
- Party: Democratic

Vincent M. Benham served as the eighth Secretary of State of Alabama from 1852 to 1856.
