= Frank N. Julian =

Secretary of State of Alabama from 1907 to 1910

27th Secretary of State of Alabama
- In office 1907–1910
- Governor: B. B. Comer
- Preceded by: Edmund R. McDavid
- Succeeded by: Cyrus B. Brown

Personal details
- Born: June 18, 1872
- Died: November 30, 1944 (aged 72)
- Party: Democratic

Frank N. Julian (June 18, 1872 – November 30, 1944) served as the 27th Secretary of State of Alabama from 1907 to 1910.

Before entering the political sphere, he worked in the newspaper business working for the North Alabamian and the St. Louis Post Dispatch. He worked as a clerk for various places in the Alabama House of Representatives from 1896 until he was elected Secretary of State.
