= Cyrus B. Brown =

American politician

28th Secretary of State of Alabama
- In office 1910–1915
- Governor: B. B. Comer; Emmet O'Neal
- Preceded by: Frank N. Julian
- Succeeded by: John Purifoy

Mayor of Montgomery
- In office 1941 – August 8, 1944
- Preceded by: William A. Gunter Jr.
- Succeeded by: David E. Dunn

Personal details
- Died: August 8, 1944
- Party: Democratic

Cyrus B. Brown served as the 28th Secretary of State of Alabama from 1910 to 1915. Before being elected Secretary of State, he served in the Air National Guard from 1899 to 1904 and he was clerk of the Legislature of Alabama from 1907 to 1911.

He got married on November 16, 1904.

He served as mayor of Montgomery, Alabama from 1941 until his death on August 8, 1944.
