= William Adams Gunter Jr. =

American politician (1871–1940)

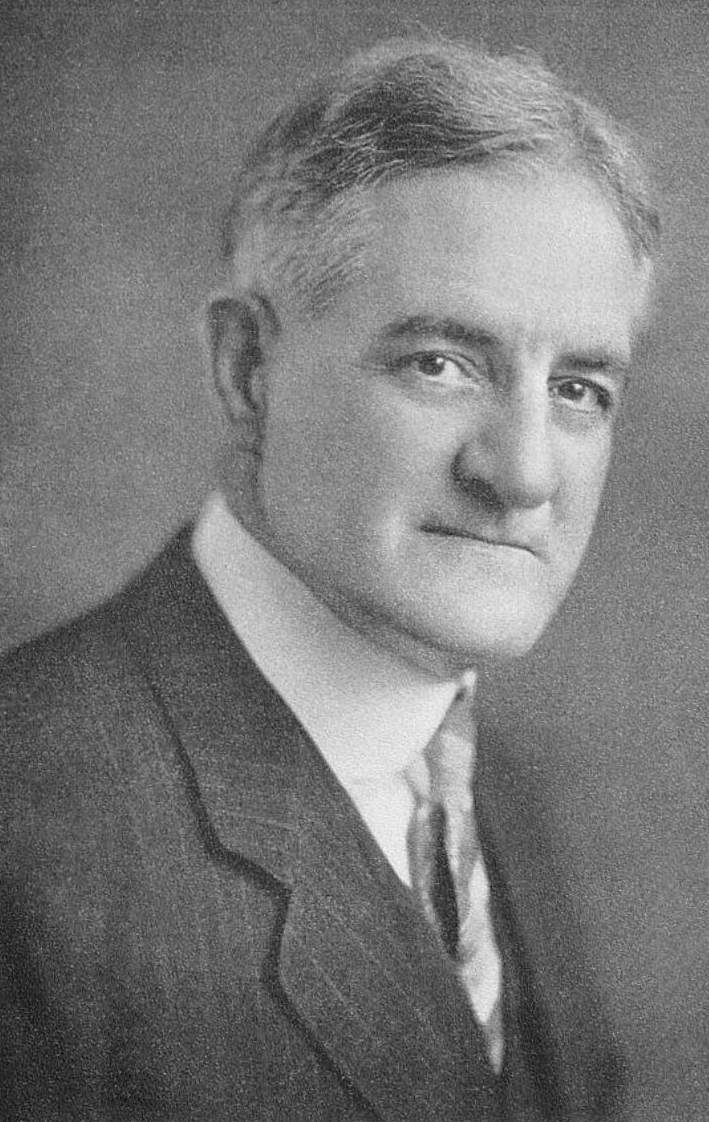
- Born: October 8, 1871; Marengo County, Alabama, US
- Died: December 4, 1940 (aged 69); Troy, Alabama, US
- Occupations: Marion Institute; University of Virginia
- Political party: Democratic
- Spouse: Julia Campbell Scott (m. 1899)

William Adams Gunter Jr. (October 8, 1871 – December 4, 1940) was a long-serving mayor of Montgomery, Alabama. He served as mayor of Montgomery from 1910 to 1915 and from 1923 to 1939. He also served in the Alabama Senate. A Democrat, he was a Knights of Pythias member, Woodman of the World, and Red Man.

He was born in Marengo County. His father William Gunter was a lawyer who served in the Confederate Army and was a state legislator in Alabama. William Gunter Jr. attended Marion Institute and the University of Virginia. He became a lawyer and served as Register of Montgomery County.

In 1899 he married Julia Campbell Scott.

He advocated for Montgomery Municipal Airport. It was used for military pilot training and civilian aviation was relocated. Gunter Air Force Base outside Montgomery is named for him.

He had several daughters and a son, William Gunter III. Cyrus B. Brown succeeded him as Mayor of Montgomery.

He died at his home in Troy, Alabama, on December 4, 1940.

== See also ==
- List of mayors of Montgomery, Alabama
