= Mark Kennedy (judge) =

American judge (1952–2024)

Henry Mark Kennedy (May 5, 1952 – July 17, 2024) was an American jurist. He served as Associate Justice on the Supreme Court of Alabama from 1989 to 1999. Previous to his service on the Supreme Court, Kennedy was appointed judge of the District Court for Montgomery County in 1978 and was elected to that position in 1980. Concurrently, he was assigned as a full-time Family Court and Juvenile Court Judge for the 15th Judicial Circuit. In 1983, he was appointed a circuit judge for the 15th Judicial Circuit and was elected to that position in 1984.

Kennedy succeeded Joe Turnham as chair of the Alabama Democratic Party from 2011 to 2013, when he resigned. He was succeeded by his vice-chair Nancy Worley. Kennedy died on July 17, 2024, at the age of 72.
