= James R. Bennett =

American politician

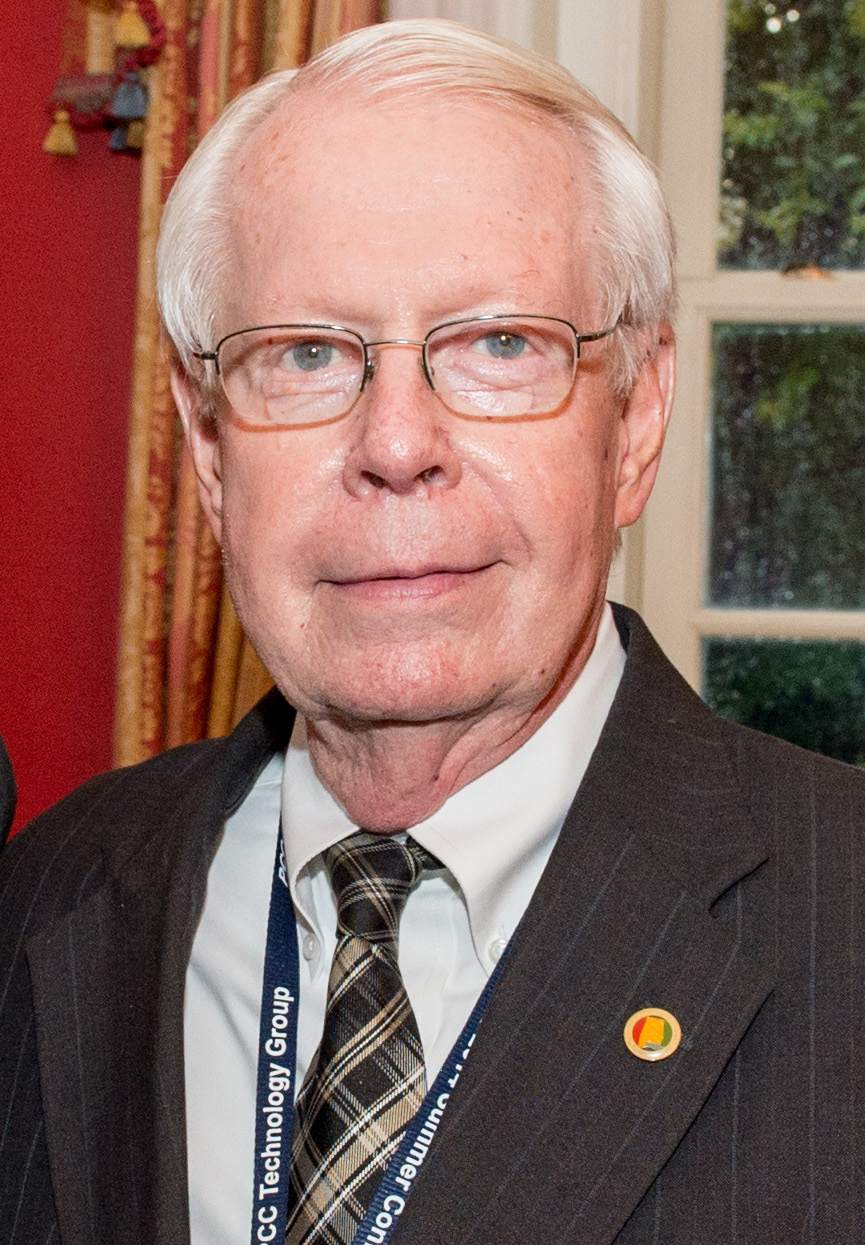
- Bennett in 2014

49th & 52nd Secretary of State of Alabama
- In office July 31, 2013 – January 19, 2015
- Governor: Robert J. Bentley
- Preceded by: Beth Chapman
- Succeeded by: John Merrill
- In office 1993–2003
- Governor: Jim Folsom Jr. Fob James; Don Siegelman
- Preceded by: Billy Joe Camp
- Succeeded by: Nancy Worley

Member of the Alabama Senate
- In office 1982-1992
- Constituency: 19th

Member of the Alabama House of Representatives
- In office 1978-1983

Personal details
- Born: January 3, 1940 Red Oak, Iowa
- Died: August 17, 2016 (aged 76) Birmingham, Alabama
- Party: Republican (1998-2016); Democratic (before 1998)
- Spouse: Andrea Bennett

James R. Bennett (January 3, 1940 – August 17, 2016) was an American Republican politician from Alabama. From 1978 to 1983, he served as a member of the Alabama House of Representatives and as a member of the Alabama Senate between 1982 and 1992. He went on to serve as Secretary of State of Alabama, from 1993 to 2003 and again from 2013 to 2015. He was a Democrat before becoming a Republican in 1997.

== Early life ==
Born in Iowa in 1940, Bennett graduated from Grundy County High School, Tracy City, Tennessee, in 1957. He moved to Alabama shortly after to study at Jacksonville State University, from which he received a Bachelor of Science degree in 1962. He was a member of the Epsilon Nu chapter of Phi Mu Alpha Sinfonia. From 1961 to 1971, Bennett was a reporter for the Birmingham Post-Herald. During his time as a reporter, he found himself in Birmingham in 1963, where he witnessed the use of fire hoses, directed by Bull Connor, on civil rights protesters. In 1969, he was selected for a national award by the American Political Science Association for his reporting on public affairs, before completing his master's degree at the University of Alabama in 1980.

== Political career ==
From 1978 to 1983, he served as a member of the Alabama House of Representatives. Prior to his appointment as Alabama's 49th Secretary of State, he served from 1983 to 1993 as a member of the Alabama Senate. He became secretary of state of Alabama, having been appointed to fill a vacancy in 1993 and subsequently elected to two terms in his own right in 1994, as a Democrat, and 1998, as a Republican.

Following his tenure as secretary of state, he was appointed as commissioner of the Alabama Department of Labor in the Cabinet of Governor Bob Riley in July 2003 and reappointed by Governor Robert Bentley in January 2011. He retired in 2012. After the resignation of Beth Chapman as Secretary of State in 2013, Governor Robert J. Bentley appointed Bennett to replace her, marking the fourth time Bennett served as Alabama's chief elections official.

He was politically active up until his death. His successor John Merrill noted that Bennett secured a position as a presidential elector for the 2016 presidential election the day before his death.

== Personal life ==
In 2006, Bennett was named a Signature Sinfonian by the national fraternity for his public service career. He served as chairman of the board of trustees at Jacksonville State, of which he had been a member since 1985, and was president of the National Association of Secretaries of State from 1999 to 2000. He authored several history books including Historic Birmingham and Jefferson County, published in 2008, and Tannehill and the Growth of the Alabama Iron Industry, published in 1999.

Bennett died of cancer on August 17, 2016. He was survived by his wife, Andrea, and two children.

Party political offices
Preceded by Billy Joe Camp	Democratic nominee for Secretary of State of Alabama; 1994	Succeeded by Nancy Worley
Preceded by Vickie Gavin	Republican nominee for Secretary of State of Alabama; 1998	Succeeded by Dave Thomas
Political offices
Preceded by Billy Joe Camp	Secretary of State of Alabama; 1993–2003	Succeeded by Nancy Worley
Preceded by Beth Chapman	Secretary of State of Alabama; 2013–2015	Succeeded by John Merrill
