= Jabez J. Parker =

American politician

15th Secretary of State of Alabama
- In office 1870–1872
- Governor: Robert B. Lindsay
- Preceded by: Charles A. Miller
- Succeeded by: Patrick Ragland

Personal details
- Party: Democratic

Jabez J. Parker served as the 15th Secretary of State of Alabama from 1870 to 1872.
