= Glen Browder =

American politician

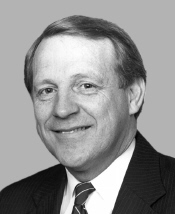

Member of the U.S. House of Representatives from Alabama's 3rd district
- In office April 4, 1989 – January 3, 1997 (Note: Browder's official service begins on the date of the special election, while he was not sworn in until April 18, 1989.)
- Preceded by: William Flynt Nichols
- Succeeded by: Bob Riley

45th Secretary of State of Alabama
- In office January 17, 1987 – January 3, 1989
- Governor: H. Guy Hunt
- Preceded by: Don Siegelman
- Succeeded by: Fred Crawford

Member of the Alabama House of Representatives
- In office 1983-1986

Personal details
- Born: January 15, 1943 (age 83) Sumter, South Carolina, U.S.
- Party: Democratic
- Spouse: Sara Moore
- Children: 1 daughter
- Education: Presbyterian College; Emory University

John Glen Browder (born January 15, 1943) is a former member of the United States House of Representatives from Alabama's 3rd congressional district.

== Early life and education ==
Browder was born in Sumter, South Carolina, and graduated in 1961 from Edmunds High School in Sumter. He earned a Bachelor of Arts in history at Presbyterian College in Clinton, South Carolina, in 1965. He went on to obtain a Master of Arts and a Ph.D. in political science from Emory University in Atlanta, Georgia, in 1971.

Before earning his graduate degrees, Browder served a brief stint in 1966 as a sportswriter for the Atlanta Journal. He worked from 1966 to 1968 as an investigator with the United States Civil Service Commission. After his time at Emory, he became a professor of political science at Jacksonville State University in Jacksonville, Alabama. He served on the faculty from 1971 to 1987. From 1978 to 1987, he was the president of Data Associates in Anniston, Alabama, primarily conducting polls and managing campaigns for candidates for public office.

== Political career ==
=== Alabama House of Representatives ===
Browder's political career began in the Alabama statehouse, where he served in the Alabama House of Representatives from 1983 to 1986. Upon taking office in January 1983, Browder was appointed to the House Judiciary Committee and the Constitution and Elections Committee. At the end of Browder's first year, Governor of Alabama George Wallace appointed him to the Ways and Means Committee. Browder and Wallace worked closely on improving education in Alabama. Following passage of Browder's Education Reform Act in 1984, which provided for the formation of the Governor's Education Reform Commission, Wallace appointed Browder vice chairman of the commission to formulate and implement a series of measures to bring the quality of education in the state up to national standards.

Browder's major accomplishments in the legislature were passing the Browder Education Reform Act of 1984, the Alabama Crime Victims Compensation Act of 1985, and the Alabama Performance-Based Career Incentive Program (Teacher Career Ladder) Act of 1985. His colleagues included him among their Outstanding Legislator ranks in 1985 and 1986, and he received special commendations from crime victims, social workers, and school financial aid administrators.

=== Secretary of State of Alabama ===
After one term in the state legislature, Browder was elected to the office of Alabama Secretary of State, serving from 1987 to 1989.

During Browder's tenure, the Secretary of State's office digitized the state's record-keeping system, established a training system for poll workers, monitored the handling of absentee ballots, purged voter rolls of ineligible — mainly deceased — voters, and registered hundreds of new voters through public outreach. Browder established and chaired the statewide Alabama Elections Reform Commission to recommend and popularize changes to outdated laws governing the state's elections. His main accomplishment as Secretary of State was the passage of his Fair Campaign Practices Act of 1988, which replaced the Corrupt Practices Act of 1915 and remains the basis of campaign finance reporting law in the state.

=== U.S. House of Representatives ===
He was elected as a Democrat to the 101st Congress, by special election, to fill the vacancy caused by the death of United States Representative William F. Nichols, and re-elected to the three succeeding Congresses (April 4, 1989 – January 3, 1997).

In the House, Browder served on the House Armed Services Committee and the House Budget Committee. He focused on military readiness and balancing the federal budget.

He successfully defended Fort McClellan, an Army training base in his district, from three efforts to close it in the early 1990s. (The Army eventually won authorization to close the base in 1995.) In 1992–93, he chaired a two-year special House inquiry, Countering the Chemical and Biological Threat in the Post-Soviet World. He advocated for benefits for veterans returning from Operation Desert Storm and study of a set of symptoms that would come to be known as Gulf War Syndrome.

Browder, a moderate Democrat, was a founding member of the Blue Dog Coalition in late 1994. As chairman of the Blue Dogs' Budget Committee and a member of the House Budget Committee, Browder introduced ideas that would eventually form the basis of bipartisan agreement in the contentious 1996 federal budget. Browder authored the Blue Dogs' budget proposals to use savings from spending cuts to pay down the federal deficit and make tax cuts dependent on meeting deficit-reduction goals.

He did not seek re-election to the House of Representatives in 1996, and his seat went to the Republican Bob Riley. Browder was instead an unsuccessful candidate for election to the United States Senate election in Alabama, 1996, losing in the Democratic primary to Alabama State Senator Roger Bedford, Jr., who also proceeded to lose to Alabama Attorney General (and future U.S. Attorney General) Jeff Sessions.

== After Congress ==
Following his time in the House of Representatives, Browder accepted two academic positions, the first as a distinguished visiting professor in the Department of National Security Affairs at the Naval Postgraduate School (1997–present), with primary responsibility in the area of "Congress and the Pentagon". He later returned to Jacksonville State University in Alabama as Eminent Scholar in American Democracy. He retired from JSU in 2005 as Emeritus Professor of American Democracy.

He has published four books, The Future of American Democracy: A Former Congressman's Unconventional Analysis, University Press of America, 2002; The South's New Racial Politics: Inside the Race Game of Southern History, NewSouth Books, 2009; and Stealth Reconstruction: An Untold Story of Racial Politics in Recent Southern History (with Artemisia Stanberry), NewSouth Books, 2010, and South Carolina's Turkish People: A History and Ethnology, University of South Carolina Press, 2018.

Party political offices
Preceded by Don Siegelman	Democratic nominee for Secretary of State of Alabama; 1986	Succeeded by Billy Joe Camp
Political offices
Preceded by Don Siegelman	Secretary of State of Alabama; 1987–1989	Succeeded by Fred Crawford
U.S. House of Representatives
Preceded by Bill Nichols	Member of the U.S. House of Representatives from Alabama's 3rd congressional district April 4, 1989–January 3, 1997	Succeeded by Bob Riley
U.S. order of precedence (ceremonial)
Preceded by Randy Hultgren as Former US Representative	Order of precedence of the United States as Former US Representative	Succeeded by Artur Davis as Former US Representative
