= Joseph D. Barron =

American politician from Alabama

22rd Secretary of State of Alabama
- In office 1890–1894
- Governor: Thomas G. Jones
- Preceded by: Charles C. Langdon
- Succeeded by: James K. Jackson

Personal details
- Born: March 19, 1833
- Died: June 11, 1910 (aged 77)
- Party: Democratic

Military service
- Allegiance: Confederate States of America
- Branch/service: Confederate States Army
- Rank: Sergeant
- Unit: 6th Regiment Alabama Cavalry
- Battles/wars: American Civil War

Joseph Day Barron (March 19, 1833 – June 11, 1910) was an editorial writer, legislator, and the 22nd Secretary of State of Alabama.

Barron was born in Upson County, Georgia, the son of Hiram and Pheriby Barron. He attended the common schools of Russell County. At the age of sixteen, he began to write for newspapers. In 1856, Barron was editor of the Louina Eagle, afterwards called the Southern Mercury. From 1878 to his death, he was connected with the editorial department of the Montgomery Advertiser.

== The 6th Regiment Alabama Cavalry ==
He served in the American Civil War as a sergeant in the 6th Alabama Cavalry. Later he served as representative from Clay County in the legislature from 1874 until 1876. He served as Chief Clerk in office of Secretary of State, Major William W. Screws, and held this position for nine years (1878–1887). He was then appointed Alabama Secretary of State in 1889 and served until 1894.

== Career ==
He was a Primitive Baptist and author of many poems, essays and short stories. He was a well-informed student of Indian law, traditions and characteristics, and wrote on these subjects, many of which are articles of great historical value.

Political offices
Preceded by Charles C. Langdon	Secretary of State of Alabama; 1894–1898	Succeeded by James K. Jackson
