= White Plains, Calhoun County, Alabama =

White Plains, Alabama
- Census-designated place
- Location within Alabama
- Coordinates: 33°44′50″N 85°41′21″W
- Country: United States
- State: Alabama
- County: Calhoun

Area
  - Total: 12.88 sq mi (33.36 km^{2})
  - Land: 12.79 sq mi (33.13 km^{2})
  - Water: 0.089 sq mi (0.23 km^{2})
- Elevation: 735 ft (224 m)

Population (2020)
  - Total: 877
  - Density: 68.6/sq mi (26.47/km^{2})
- Time zone: UTC-6 (Central (CST))
  - Summer (DST): UTC-5 (CDT)
- Area codes: 256 & 938
- GNIS feature ID: 2582707

White Plains is a census-designated place and unincorporated community in Calhoun County, Alabama, United States. Its population was 877 as of the 2020 census. The community is located in eastern Calhoun County along Alabama Highway 9.

== Demographics ==
Historical population
Census	Pop.	Note	%±
1880	140		—
1890	202		44.3%
2010	811		—
2020	877		8.1%
U.S. Decennial Census

White Plains was first listed as a census designated place in the 2010 U.S. census.

White Plains CDP, Alabama – Racial and ethnic composition Note: the US Census treats Hispanic/Latino as an ethnic category. This table excludes Latinos from the racial categories and assigns them to a separate category. Hispanics/Latinos may be of any race.
Race / Ethnicity (NH = Non-Hispanic)	Pop 2010	Pop 2020	% 2010	% 2020
White alone (NH)	774	799	95.44%	91.11%
Black or African American alone (NH)	14	25	1.73%	2.85%
Native American or Alaska Native alone (NH)	3	3	0.37%	0.34%
Asian alone (NH)	2	4	0.25%	0.46%
Native Hawaiian or Pacific Islander alone (NH)	0	0	0.00%	0.00%
Other race alone (NH)	1	0	0.12%	0.00%
Mixed race or Multiracial (NH)	6	30	0.74%	3.42%
Hispanic or Latino (any race)	11	16	1.36%	1.82%
Total	811	877	100.00%	100.00%

== Education ==
The Calhoun County Schools system operates three schools within the community:

- White Plains High School
- White Plains Middle School
- White Plains Elementary School

White Plains High School's athletic teams are known as the Wildcats and compete in Class 4A of the Alabama High School Athletic Association.
