= Billy Joe Camp =

American politician

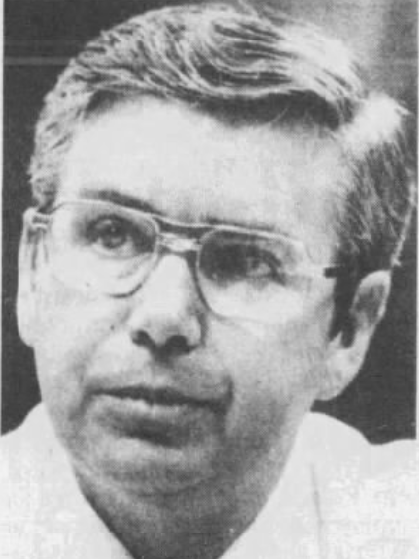
- Camp in 1982

48th Secretary of State of Alabama
- In office 1991–1993
- Governor: H. Guy Hunt
- Preceded by: Perry Hand
- Succeeded by: James R. Bennett

Personal details
- Born: c. 1939 Cullman County, Alabama
- Party: Democratic

Billy Joe Camp (born c. 1939) was elected Alabama's 48th secretary of state in November 1990 and served from January 1991 until 1993.

A Democrat, he had previously served as a commissioner on the Alabama Public Service Commission and as a gubernatorial press secretary as well as State Development Officer. In 1986 he ran for governor of the state.

Camp is an alumnus of the University of North Alabama.

Party political offices
Preceded by Glen Browder	Democratic nominee for Secretary of State of Alabama; 1990	Succeeded by James R. Bennett
Political offices
Preceded by Perry Hand	Secretary of State of Alabama; 1991–1993	Succeeded by James R. Bennett
