= David McDavid =

American businessman (born 1942)

David McDavid (born February 16, 1942) is an American businessman and investor from Texas. McDavid is most known for building the auto empire David McDavid Automotive Group, comprising 17 dealerships across Texas, which he started at the age of 19. McDavid sold his dealership empire in 1997 to Asbury Automotive Group for $380 million according to sources.

McDavid has also been involved in professional sports teams investments; he was a part of the group (headed by Ross Perot, Jr.) that purchased the NBA’s Dallas Mavericks from original owner Don Carter in 1996 and sold to Mark Cuban in 2000. He also negotiated with Turner Broadcasting System in 2003 to buy the Atlanta Hawks and Atlanta Thrashers, but was unsuccessful in purchasing the teams. In 2008, a jury ruled that Turner Broadcasting System Inc. had breached contract with McDavid awarding him $281 million verdict over the failed deal. The trial case is McDavid v. Turner Broadcasting System Inc., 2005-cv-101902, Fulton County Superior Court (Atlanta). McDavid also has involvement in the horse industry. In 2001, McDavid purchased the stallion Hes a Peptospoonful for a reported $1.5 million. However, the cutting horse, ranking No. 8 sire of the Top Sires in the Equi-Stat Cutting Statistics of 2011, died of an unknown cause in 2012.

David McDavid is married to Stacie McDavid. They have one child together, Sterling McDavid. David also has two sons, David McDavid Jr. and Jimmy McDavid, from a previous marriage.
