= New Hope, Alabama =

City in Alabama, United States

- City
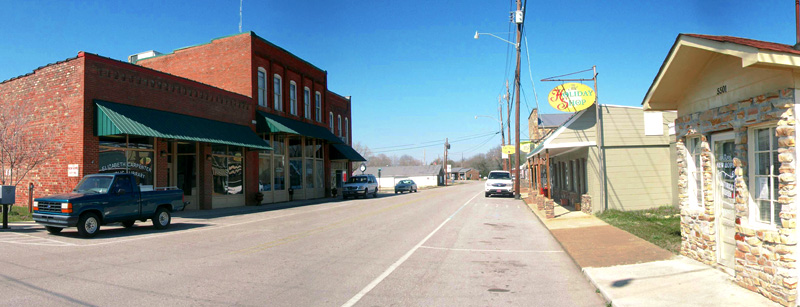
- New Hope's Main Street

- Location in Madison County, Alabama
- Coordinates: 34°32′13″N 86°24′46″W
- Country: United States
- State: Alabama
- County: Madison
- Incorporated: September 5, 1956

Area
  - Total: 8.715 sq mi (22.572 km^{2})
  - Land: 8.658 sq mi (22.423 km^{2})
  - Water: 0.058 sq mi (0.149 km^{2})
- Elevation: 614 ft (187 m)

Population (2020)
  - Total: 2,889
  - Estimate (2023): 2,927
  - Density: 333/sq mi (128.5/km^{2})
- Time zone: UTC−6 (Central (CST))
  - Summer (DST): UTC−5 (CDT)
- ZIP Code: 35760
- Area codes: 256 and 938
- FIPS code: 01-54168
- GNIS feature ID: 2404361
- Website: newhopeal.gov

New Hope is a city in Madison County, Alabama, United States, and is included in the Huntsville-Decatur Combined Statistical Area. The population was 2,889 at the 2020 census.

== History ==
Originally named "Cloud's Town" in 1829 by its founder, William Cloud, it was incorporated in 1832 under the name of "Vienna". Lieutenant Colonel Alfred Reed of the 12th Indiana Cavalry seized the town on May 29, 1864, during the American Civil War. Vienna was burned by the Union Army on December 15, 1864, because of the constant skirmishes with the guerrilla fighters in the area. All that remained were the post office and Masonic Lodge. Since there was already a post office called Vienna in southern Alabama and rules were that there could not be two post offices with the same name at that time, the rebuilt city was incorporated in 1883 as "New Hope", taking its name from the New Hope Methodist Church. The settlement known as Cloud's Town was actually settled in what is now known as Cloud's Cove just off Hobbs Island Road, and is a few miles from the town of New Hope.

== Geography ==
New Hope is located in southeastern Madison County along U.S. Route 431. It is 19 miles (31 km) southeast of the center of Huntsville and the same distance northwest of Guntersville

According to the United States Census Bureau, the city has a total area of 8.715 square miles (22.57 km^{2}), of which 8.658 square miles (22.42 km^{2}) is land and 0.057 square miles (0.15 km^{2}), is water.

== Demographics ==
Historical population
Census	Pop.	Note	%±
1880	146		—
1900	208		—
1910	301		44.7%
1920	315		4.7%
1930	446		41.6%
1960	953		—
1970	1,300		36.4%
1980	1,546		18.9%
1990	2,248		45.4%
2000	2,539		12.9%
2010	2,810		10.7%
2020	2,889		2.8%
2023 (est.)	2,927	▲	1.3%
U.S. Decennial Census; 2020 Census

Note that New Hope did not appear on the 1890 and 1940-1950 U.S. Censuses. In the case of the latter two years, it is likely their incorporation charter lapsed and was not renewed until prior to its reappearance on the 1960 U.S. Census.

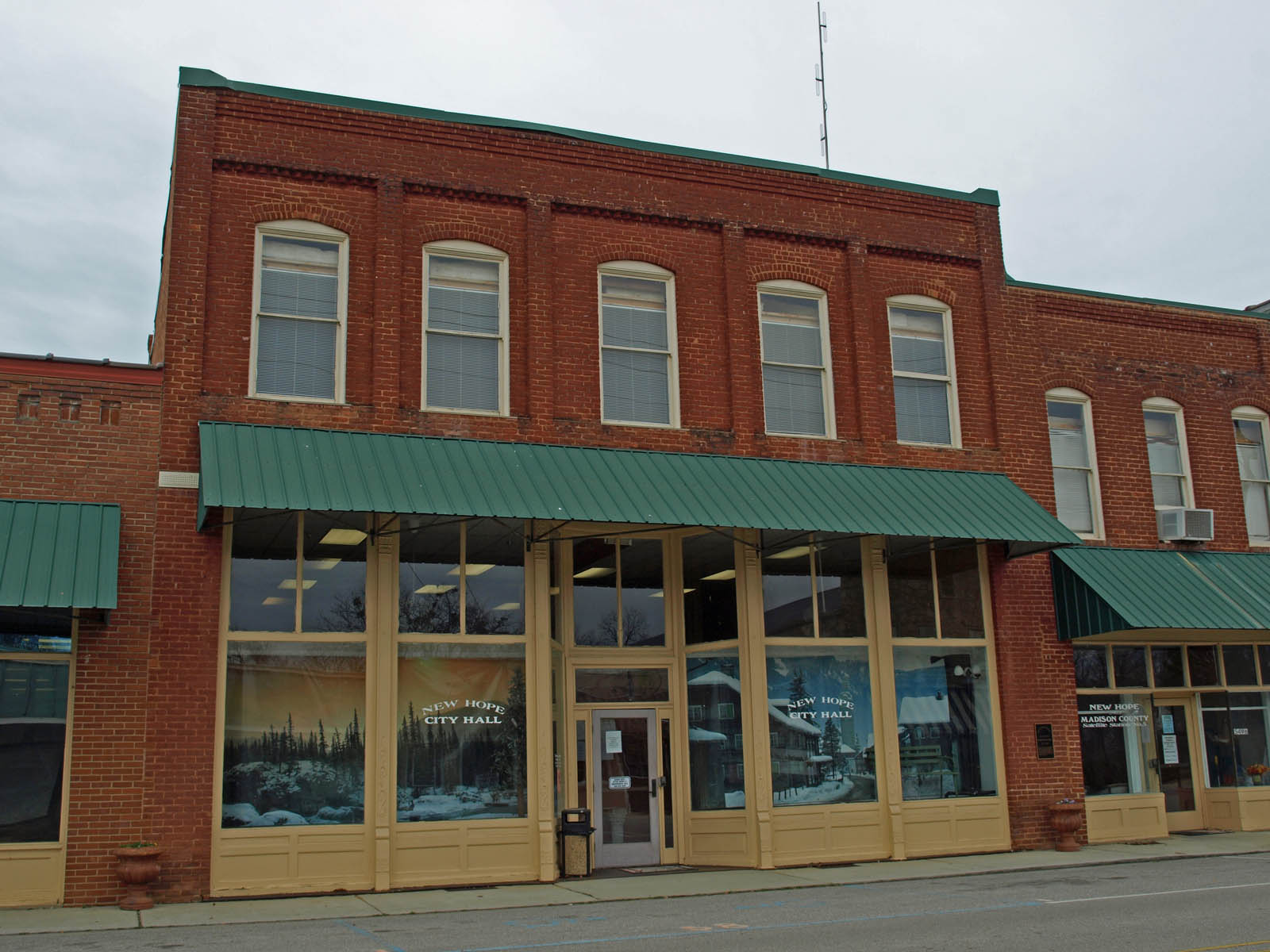
Butler's Store, which now serves as New Hope's City Hall, was listed on the National Register of Historic Places on August 31, 1992.

=== 2020 census ===
As of the 2020 census, New Hope had a population of 2,889. The median age was 40.3 years. 22.5% of residents were under the age of 18 and 17.9% were 65 years of age or older. For every 100 females there were 97.5 males, and for every 100 females age 18 and over there were 94.0 males. 0.0% of residents lived in urban areas, while 100.0% lived in rural areas.

There were 1,177 households, including 795 families, in the city. Of all households, 29.8% had children under the age of 18 living in them, 51.8% were married-couple households, 17.6% had a male householder and no spouse or partner present, and 26.1% had a female householder and no spouse or partner present. About 27.8% of all households were made up of individuals, and 11.6% had someone living alone who was 65 years of age or older.

There were 1,286 housing units, of which 8.5% were vacant. The homeowner vacancy rate was 2.3% and the rental vacancy rate was 3.4%.

New Hope racial composition
Race	Number	Percent
White (non-Hispanic)	2,541	87.95%
Black or African American (non-Hispanic)	38	1.32%
Native American	60	2.08%
Asian	6	0.21%
Pacific Islander	3	0.1%
Other/Mixed	150	5.19%
Hispanic or Latino	91	3.15%

=== 2010 census ===
As of the 2010 census, there were 2,810 people in 1,143 households, including 795 families, in the city. The population density was 325 inhabitants per square mile (125/km^{2}). There were 1,258 housing units at an average density of 146.3 per square mile (56.5/km^{2}). The racial makeup of the city was 93.7% White, 0.2% Black or African American, 2.5% Native American, 0.3% Asian, 0.7% from other races, and 2.5% from two or more races. 1.4% of the population were Hispanic or Latino of any race.

Of the 1,143 households 30.0% had children under the age of 18 living with them, 51.8% were married couples living together, 12.5% had a female householder with no husband present, and 30.4% were non-families. 25.5% of households were one person and 11.0% were one person aged 65 or older. The average household size was 2.46 and the average family size was 2.93.

The age distribution was 23.5% under the age of 18, 8.5% from 18 to 24, 27.6% from 25 to 44, 27.7% from 45 to 64, and 12.7% 65 or older. The median age was 38.2 years. For every 100 females, there were 96.5 males. For every 100 females age 18 and over, there were 95.7 males.

The median household income was $38,423 and the median family income was $47,396. Males had a median income of $33,135 versus $24,167 for females. The per capita income for the city was $19,104. About 5.7% of families and 11.5% of the population were below the poverty line, including 15.3% of those under age 18 and 9.8% of those age 65 or over.

=== 2000 census ===
As of the 2000 census, there were 2,539 people in 1,033 households, including 729 families, in the city. The population density was 287.6 inhabitants per square mile (111.0/km^{2}). There were 1,124 housing units at an average density of 127.3 per square mile (49.2/km^{2}). The racial makeup of the city was 94.80% White, 0.39% Black or African American, 1.81% Native American, 0.24% Asian, 0.67% from other races, and 2.09% from two or more races. 0.95% of the population were Hispanic or Latino of any race.

Of the 1,033 households 34.2% had children under the age of 18 living with them, 54.1% were married couples living together, 12.3% had a female householder with no husband present, and 29.4% were non-families. 26.8% of households were one person and 11.3% were one person aged 65 or older. The average household size was 2.46 and the average family size was 2.97.

The age distribution was 26.0% under the age of 18, 8.5% from 18 to 24, 30.8% from 25 to 44, 21.4% from 45 to 64, and 13.3% 65 or older. The median age was 36 years. For every 100 females, there were 90.5 males. For every 100 females age 18 and over, there were 89.5 males.

The median household income was $31,458 and the median family income was $39,427. Males had a median income of $30,852 versus $20,263 for females. The per capita income for the city was $15,655. About 8.2% of families and 11.4% of the population were below the poverty line, including 14.4% of those under age 18 and 15.1% of those age 65 or over.

== Education ==
The local school district is Madison County Schools.

- New Hope Elementary School (K-6)
- New Hope High School (7–12)

== Transportation ==
Dial-a-ride transit service is provided by Transportation for Rural Areas of Madison County (TRAM).

== Notable people ==
- Ernest Hinds, US Army major general
- Jim Tabor, professional baseball player
- Nancy Worley, 50th Secretary of State of Alabama
