= Robert P. McDavid =

American businessman and politician

24th Secretary of State of Alabama
- In office 1898–1903
- Governor: Joseph F. Johnston; William D. Jelks; William J. Samford; William D. Jelks
- Preceded by: James K. Jackson
- Succeeded by: James Thomas Heflin

Personal details
- Born: April 16, 1867 Huntsville, Alabama
- Died: August 20, 1915 (aged 48)
- Party: Democratic

Robert Patton McDavid (April 16, 1867 – August 20, 1915) was an American businessman and politician who served as the 24th Secretary of State of Alabama from 1898 to 1903.

He was born on April 16, 1867, in Huntsville, Alabama, to John Jackson McDavid and Mary (Patton) McDavid. He was the grandson of Alabama governor Robert M. Patton. Before he was elected Secretary of State, he worked in the newspaper business. He worked for the Evening Chronicle then went on to work for the Age-Herald where he rose from police reporter to managing editor. He was also a clerk in the Alabama House of Representatives for three legislative sessions.

He married Virginia Irene Smith in 1890 and had five children. He died on August 20, 1915.
