= Edmund R. McDavid =

Former secretary of the state of Alabama

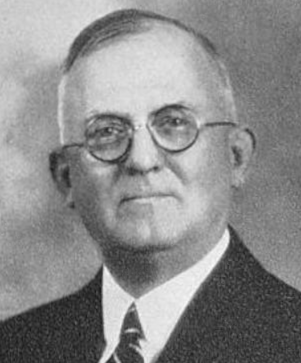

26th Secretary of State of Alabama
- In office 1904–1907
- Governor: William D. Jelks
- Preceded by: James Thomas Heflin
- Succeeded by: Frank N. Julian

Personal details
- Born: February 2, 1870 Huntsville, Alabama, US
- Died: December 6, 1948 (aged 78) Birmingham, Alabama, US
- Resting place: Elmwood Cemetery
- Party: Democratic
- Spouse: Mittie Rose Owen (m. 1891)

Edmund Richardson McDavid (1870–1948) served as the 26th Secretary of State of Alabama from 1904 to 1907.

== Biography ==
Edmund R. McDavid was born in Huntsville, Alabama on February 2, 1870.

Before he became Secretary of State he was in the insurance industry. He worked for Southern Mutual Fire Insurance Company and the Birmingham Underwriters' Agency. He was appointed Secretary of State by Governor William D. Jelks.

He married writer Mitylene "Mittie" Rose Owen on June 30, 1891.

He died in Birmingham, Alabama on December 6, 1948, and was buried at Elmwood Cemetery.
