= Nancy Worley =

American politician (1951–2021)

Chair of the Alabama Democratic Party
- In office April 22, 2013 – November 2, 2019; Acting: April 22, 2013 – October 5, 2013
- Preceded by: Mark Kennedy
- Succeeded by: Christopher J. England

50th Secretary of State of Alabama
- In office January 20, 2003 – January 15, 2007
- Governor: Bob Riley
- Preceded by: James R. Bennett
- Succeeded by: Beth Chapman

Personal details
- Born: November 7, 1951; New Hope, Alabama, U.S.
- Died: December 29, 2021 (aged 70); Montgomery, Alabama, U.S.
- Political party: Democratic
- Education: University of Montevallo (BA); Jacksonville State University (MA)

Nancy Worley (November 7, 1951 – December 29, 2021) was an American Democratic politician who served as Secretary of State of Alabama from 2003 to 2007 and Chairwoman of the Alabama Democratic Party from 2013 to 2019.

== Early life and education ==
Worley was born in New Hope, Alabama on November 7, 1951.

She received a B.A. degree from the University of Montevallo and an M.A. from Jacksonville State University.

== Career ==
Worley served on many commissions across the state of Alabama as an advocate for educators and women. She taught for 25 years in the Decatur School System, and served two terms as the president of the Alabama Education Association (AEA) from 1983-1984 and 1995-1997. She won various teaching awards including Teacher of the Year; a Teacher Hall of Fame nominee; honored by the Alabama Jaycees as Alabama’s Outstanding Young Educator; and Good Housekeeping’s "100 Young Women of Promise."

She served as Alabama Secretary of State from 2003 to 2007. In the 2006 general election, she was defeated for re-election by then-State Auditor Beth Chapman. Worley's tenure as Secretary of State included substantial reforms, including longer and uniform polling hours, voter identification, and automatic recounts in close races.

She was elected in 2013 by the Alabama Democratic Party to be chairwoman of the party in the Republican-dominated state, having previously served as interim Chair since April 2013 and Vice Chair since January 2007.

In July 2015, Worley, five other former AEA presidents, and former AEA Associate Executive Secretary Joe L. Reed, accused the National Education Association of violating its bylaws and overstepping its role in regards to the AEA.

=== Legal issues and removal as chair ===
Worley was indicted by a Montgomery County grand jury in March 2007 on five misdemeanor and one felony charge. The charges, resulting from an investigation by Alabama Attorney General Troy King, accused Worley of soliciting support from five of her employees during her unsuccessful re-election campaign in 2006. A few days after the trial started, the presiding judge dropped the felony charge, and indefinitely postponed the trial of related misdemeanor charges. In October 2012, Worley pleaded guilty via a "best interest" plea on one misdemeanor count and agreed to pay a $100 fine. Worley's lawyers revealed a letter, sent by State Treasurer Kay Ivey to her employees, soliciting campaign contributions for the 2008 presidential campaign of former Massachusetts Governor Mitt Romney. Ivey was the Alabama chairwoman of Romney's campaign. Worley's lawyers pointed out that King had not prosecuted fellow Republican Ivey, as he had Worley.

In August 2019, Worley and Randy Kelley, state party's deputy chair, were stripped of their credentials as members of the Democratic National Committee for not complying with DNC demands for revisions to the Alabama Democratic Party's bylaws. On November 2, 2019, Worley was removed as the chair with a unanimous vote.

== Death ==
On December 20, 2021, it was reported that Worley was gravely ill and on life support in a Montgomery hospital. She died on December 29, at the age of 70.

Political offices
Preceded by James R. Bennett	Secretary of State of Alabama; 2003–2007	Succeeded by Beth Chapman
Party political offices
Preceded by James R. Bennett	Democratic nominee for Secretary of State of Alabama; 1998, 2002, 2006	Succeeded by Scott Gilliland
Preceded by Mark Kennedy	Chair of the Alabama Democratic Party; 2013–2019	Succeeded by Christopher J. England
