= J. Thomas Heflin =

American politician (1869–1951)

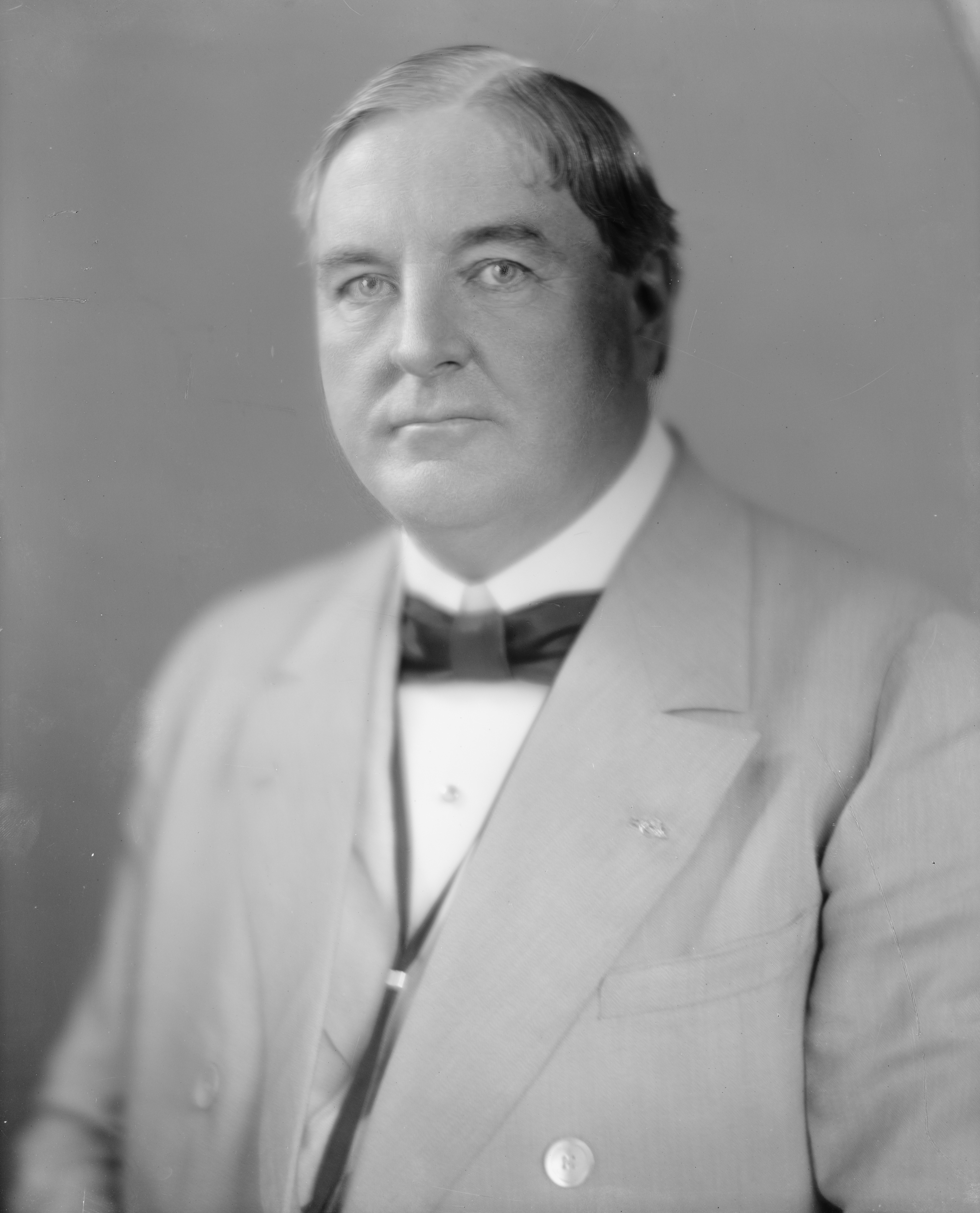

United States Senator from Alabama
- In office November 3, 1920 – March 3, 1931
- Preceded by: B. B. Comer
- Succeeded by: John H. Bankhead II

Member of the U.S. House of Representatives from Alabama's 5th district
- In office May 19, 1904 – November 1, 1920
- Preceded by: Charles Winston Thompson
- Succeeded by: William B. Bowling

25th Secretary of State of Alabama
- In office 1903–1904
- Governor: William D. Jelks
- Preceded by: Robert P. McDavid
- Succeeded by: Edmund R. McDavid

Personal details
- Born: April 9, 1869 Louina, Alabama, U.S.
- Died: April 22, 1951 (aged 82) LaFayette, Alabama, U.S.
- Party: Democratic
- Relatives: Robert Stell Heflin (uncle); Howell Heflin (nephew)
- Education: Alabama Agricultural and Mechanical College

James Thomas Heflin (April 9, 1869 – April 22, 1951), nicknamed "Cotton Tom", was an American politician who served as a United States representative and United States senator from Alabama.

== Early life ==
Born in Louina, Alabama, he attended the Agriculture and Mechanical College of Alabama (now Auburn University). He never graduated, but independently read law and was admitted to the bar in 1893, practicing law in LaFayette, Alabama.

== Early career ==
Heflin first rose to political prominence as a delegate who helped to draft the 1901 Constitution of Alabama. Heflin argued, successfully, for completely excluding Black Alabamians from voting, stating, "God Almighty intended the negro to be the servant of the white man." As Secretary of State in 1903, Heflin was an outspoken supporter of men put on trial for enslaving black laborers through fraudulent convict leasing. As detailed in Douglas A. Blackmon's book, Slavery by Another Name, the practices were a brutal, post-emancipation form of slavery in which African Americans were often falsely convicted of crimes and then sold to farmers or industrialists. Heflin explicitly used white supremacist rhetoric to mobilize support for the defendants. He argued before a group of Confederate veterans that forcing blacks to labor was a means to hold them in their proper social position.

== House years ==
In 1904, Heflin was elected to the House of Representatives as a Democrat in a special election to fill the vacancy left by the death of Charles Winston Thompson. He defeated five other candidates in the election, including future Florida governor Sidney Johnston Catts. Four years later, while he was a member of the House, he shot and seriously wounded a black man who confronted him on a Washington streetcar. Heflin threw the victim, Lewis Lundy, off the streetcar and shot at him through the streetcar window. Lundy received a wound to the head, and reports vary on whether it was due to pistol-whipping by Heflin, by the fall from the streetcar, or by a bullet wound. A white bystander, Thomas McCreery, was wounded by a stray bullet fired by Heflin. Although indicted, Heflin had the charges dismissed. In subsequent campaigns, he bragged of the shooting as one of his major career accomplishments.

On May 10, 1913, Heflin introduced House Resolution 103 requesting President Woodrow Wilson, members of his Cabinet, the U.S. Senate, the U.S. House of Representatives, and other federal officials to don white carnations, "or some other white flower," to honor mothers for being "the greatest source of our country’s strength and inspiration.” The tradition of wearing white carnations (and later red carnations) spread across the nation. The Willard Hotel in Washington, D.C., adorned its lobby with vases of white carnations, as did many restaurants in the capital city. With the positive response to the 1913 resolution, Heflin introduced formal legislation in 1914, designating the second Sunday in May, Mother's Day. Heflin's 1914 resolution made no mention of carnations, but requested that the U.S. flag be displayed at government offices, homes, and businesses across the country, “as a public expression of our love and reverence for the mothers of our country.” After quickly passing the House and being directed through the Senate by former Representative Morris Sheppard of Texas, the bill went to the President's desk on May 8, and became law that same day.

He argued for the repeal of the Fourteenth and Fifteenth amendments.

== Senate years ==
Heflin continued to serve in the House until 1920, when he was elected to the Senate to fill the vacancy caused by the death of John H. Bankhead. In the 1920s, he expressed strong hostility to the Knights of Columbus. In 1928, Heflin further expressed outrage that Al Smith was the party's nominee and inveighed against Catholic influences on the Democratic Party; he attacked Smith and the pope on the Senate floor, and "embarked on a nationwide speaking tour, partially funded by the KKK." Instead of Smith, he supported Republican Herbert Hoover for president and is sometimes credited with coining the term "yellow dog".

The Democrats thus did not renominate Heflin for the Senate in 1930. He ran as an independent candidate, losing decisively to John H. Bankhead II. Returning to Washington to serve out his term, Heflin initiated a Senate investigation of voting fraud to try to overturn Bankhead's election. The inquiry lasted 15 months and cost $100,000 (equivalent to $1,927,000 in 2025).

In the same year, Heflin officially protested in the Senate against New York's legalization of racial intermarriage between a black man and a white woman. New York Senator Royal S. Copeland reacted angrily to Heflin, who replied that if Copeland went someday to the South on a presidential campaign, he would be lynched and hanged by the population.

In April 1932, with Heflin's term expired and Bankhead seated, the Senate prepared to vote on a committee recommendation against Heflin. He delivered a five-hour oration, punctuating his remarks with vehement gestures and racist jokes. As he thundered to a conclusion, the gallery audience, packed with his supporters, jumped to its feet with a roar of approval. They were ordered out of the chamber. Two days later, the Senate voted by a wide margin to dismiss Heflin's claim.

Heflin was suspected of being a member of the Ku Klux Klan. In 1937, the Imperial Wizard, Hiram Wesley Evans, told the press that Heflin had joined the secret order in the late 1920s.

== Later life ==
After his defeat, Heflin was an unsuccessful candidate for election to the House and Senate on several occasions. Later, he was appointed special representative of the Federal Housing Administration under President Franklin D. Roosevelt. He died in 1951 in LaFayette, Alabama.

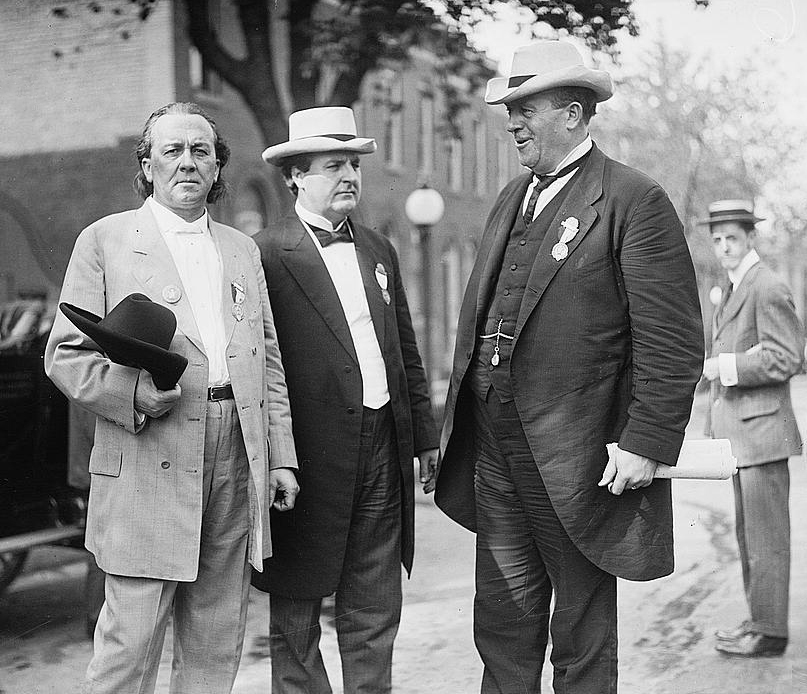
James K. Vardaman, Heflin, and Ollie James in 1912

== Legacy ==
Heflin was the nephew of Robert Stell Heflin, a congressman from Alabama. His own nephew, Howell Heflin, was also later elected U.S. senator from Alabama and served from 1979 to 1997.

Party political offices
Preceded by John H. Bankhead	Democratic nominee for U.S. Senator from Alabama (Class 2); 1920, 1924	Succeeded by John H. Bankhead II
Political offices
Preceded by Robert P. McDavid	Secretary of State of Alabama; 1903–1904	Succeeded by Edmund R. McDavid
U.S. House of Representatives
Preceded by Charles Winston Thompson	Member of the U.S. House of Representatives from Alabama's 5th congressional district 1904 - 1920	Succeeded by William B. Bowling
U.S. Senate
Preceded by B. B. Comer	U.S. senator (Class 2) from Alabama; 1920–1931; Served alongside: Oscar Underwood and Hugo Black	Succeeded by John H. Bankhead II
