= Secretary of State of Alabama =

US constitutional officer

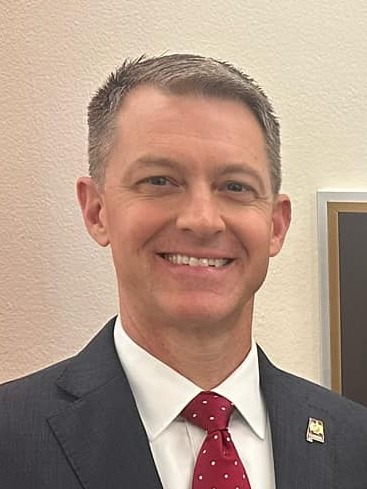
- Incumbent; Wes Allen since January 16, 2023
- Type: Secretary of State
- Term length: 4 years
- Constituting instrument: Sections 114, 118, 132, and 134 of the Alabama Constitution and throughout The Code of Alabama
- Formation: 1818
- First holder: Henry Hitchcock
- Succession: Sixth
- Website: www.sos.alabama.gov

The secretary of state of Alabama is one of the constitutional officers of the U.S. state of Alabama. The office predates the statehood of Alabama, dating back to the Alabama Territory. From 1819 to 1901, the secretary of state served a two-year term until the State Constitution was changed to set the term to four years. Up until 1868 the secretary of state was elected by the Alabama Legislature, but is now popularly elected. The terms and over 1,000 duties of the office are defined by Sections 114, 118, 132, and 134 of the Alabama Constitution and throughout the Code of Alabama.

The secretary of state must be at least 25 years old, a U.S. citizen for at least seven years, an Alabama state resident for at least five years, and a registered voter. The secretary of state and governor are on the same election cycle, and may only serve two consecutive terms; to hold the office for more terms, the office must be vacated for at least one term. The governor may appoint a replacement secretary of state in the case of resignation or death.

== History ==
The Alabama Territory maintained an office of territorial secretary beginning in 1818. In 1819, Alabama became a state, and the position of secretary of state became a legislatively-appointed office with the incumbent subject to a term of two years. In 1868, the office became popularly-elective. In 1901, Alabama adopted a new constitution which extended the term of office to four years.

== Duties and responsibilities ==
The office of secretary of state maintains several official state records including copies of state laws, gubernatorial orders, and incorporations, and is responsible for authenticating official copies of some documents. They are the keeper of the Great Seal of the State of Alabama, which is used in the authentication process. The secretary is also ex officio "Chief State Elections Official" for all federal, state, special, and constitutional electoral contests.

== Organization ==
The secretary of state's office retains a staff of about 40 people. It is organized as follows:

- The Executive Division administers the day-to-day operations of the secretary of state's office and also maintains the notaries public database and Civil Law Notaries.
- The Business Services Division of the secretary of state's office is divided into two sections: Business Entities, which operates as a depository for records of domestic entities and foreign entities that have qualified to transact business in Alabama, and Uniform Commercial Code (UCC), which operates a filing and retrieval center for UCC financing statements at the state level.
- The Elections Division administers elections and campaign finance laws, including the preparation of ballots and implementation of state and federal election laws (such as the Help America Vote Act).
- The Government Support/Authentications & Trademarks Division maintains the distribution of the Acts of Alabama, preserves the use of the state seal, licenses Athlete Agents, oversees trademarking, and authenticates documents with either an apostille or certification.
- The Government Records Section is responsible for maintenance of legislative and other government records, including land titles. The state holds land titles going back to the date of statehood.
- The Finance Division works with the Executive Division to discuss budgets and handle transactions with state vendors.
- The Information Technology (IT) Division maintains the office's network security and runs the live Elections Night Reporting system during Alabama elections.

The Alabama secretary of state's website also contains a public organizational chart that features a more in-depth depiction of each division and the titles of each staff member therein.

== Officeholders ==
The current secretary of state is Republican Wes Allen from Pike County. Allen was elected secretary of state in November 2022, after serving one term in the Alabama House of Representatives from 2018 to 2022. Allen took office on January 16, 2023, succeeding John Merrill, who was first elected in 2014 and served from 2015 to 2023.

From 1944 to 1979, the office was held by five different women, the first of whom was Sibyl Pool. Agnes Baggett was the longest serving secretary of state, having been elected to three non-consecutive terms.

The parties are as follows: Democraticic (D) and Republican (R), or Party Not Known.

Alabama secretaries of state
#	Image	Name	Term	Party
1		Henry Hitchcock	1818–1819	
2		Thomas A. Rodgers	1819–1821	
3		James J. Pleasants	1821–1824	
4		James I. Thornton	1824–1834	
5		Edmund A. Webster	1834–1836	
6		Thomas B. Tunstall	1836–1840	
7		William Garrett	1840–1852	Democratic
8		Vincent M. Benham	1852–1856	Democratic
9		James H. Weaver	1856–1860	
10		Patrick Henry Brittan	1860–1865	Democratic
11		Albert Stanhope Elmore^{1}	1865	
12		David D. Dalton	1865–1867	Democratic
13		Micah Taul	1867–1868	Democratic
14		Charles A. Miller	1868–1870	Republican
15		Jabez J. Parker	1870–1872	Democratic
16		Patrick Ragland	1872–1873	Republican
17		Neander H. Rice	1873–1874	Republican
18		Rufus King Boyd	1874–1878	Democratic
19		William W. Screws	1878–1882	Democratic
20		Ellis Phelan	1882–1885	Democratic
21		Charles C. Langdon	1885–1890	Democratic
22		Joseph D. Barron	1890–1894	Democratic
23		James K. Jackson	1894–1898	Democratic
24		Robert P. McDavid	1898–1903	Democratic
25		James Thomas Heflin	1903–1904	Democratic
26		Edmund R. McDavid	1904–1907	Democratic
27		Frank N. Julian	1907–1910	Democratic
28		Cyrus B. Brown	1910–1915	Democratic
29		John Purifoy	1915–1919	Democratic
30		William Peyton Cobb	1919–1923	Democratic
31		Sidney Herbert Blan	1923–1927	Democratic
32		John Marvin Brandon	1927–1931	Democratic
33		Pete Jarman	1931–1935	Democratic
34		David Howell Turner	1935–1939	Democratic
35		John Marvin Brandon	1939–1943	Democratic
36		David Howell Turner	1943–1944	Democratic
37		Sibyl Pool	1944–1951	Democratic
38		Agnes Baggett	1951–1955	Democratic
39		Mary Texas Hurt Garner	1955–1959	Democratic
40		Bettye Frink	1959–1963	Democratic
41		Agnes Baggett	1963–1967	Democratic
42		Mabel Sanders Amos	1967–1975	Democratic
43		Agnes Baggett	1975–1979	Democratic
44		Don Siegelman	1979–1987	Democratic
45		Glen Browder	1987–1989	Democratic
46		Fred Crawford	1989–1989	Republican
47		Perry Hand	1989–1991	Republican
48		Billy Joe Camp	1991–1993	Democratic
49		Jim Bennett	1993–1998	Democratic
49		Jim Bennett^{2}	1998–2003	Republican
50		Nancy Worley	2003–2007	Democratic
51		Beth Chapman	2007–2013	Republican
52		Jim Bennett	2013–2015	Republican
53		John Merrill	2015–2023	Republican
54		Wes Allen	2023–present	Republican

Notes:

1. First native-born Alabamian to serve as Secretary of State.
2. Switched to Republican Party in 1998.
