= 1994 Alabama gubernatorial election =

- November 8, 1994
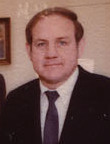

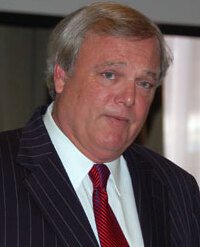
Nominee	Fob James	Jim Folsom Jr.
Party	Republican	Democratic
Popular vote	604,926	594,169
Percentage	50.33%	49.43%
- County results James: 50–60% 60–70% 70–80% Folsom: 50–60% 60–70% 70–80% 80–90%
Governor before election
Jim Folsom Jr.
Democratic
Elected Governor
Fob James
Republican

The 1994 Alabama gubernatorial election was held on November 8, 1994, to select the governor of Alabama. The election saw Republican Fob James defeat incumbent Democrat Jim Folsom Jr. in an upset. This was the first of three consecutive Alabama gubernatorial elections where the incumbent was defeated. This was one of four gubernatorial elections where an incumbent Democrat was defeated in 1994.

== Democratic primary ==
The Democratic primary saw Jim Folsom defeat Paul Hubbert for the Democratic nomination. Lieutenant Governor Folsom became governor on April 22, 1993, after Republican Governor H. Guy Hunt was removed from office.

=== Candidates ===
- Tom Hayden
- Paul Hubbert, Executive Secretary of the Alabama Education Association and nominee for governor in 1990
- Jim Folsom Jr., incumbent Governor
- F. Ross Stewart

=== Results ===
Democratic primary results
Party	Candidate	Votes	%
Democratic	Jim Folsom Jr. (incumbent)	380,227	54.04
Democratic	Paul Hubbert	285,554	40.58
Democratic	F. Ross Stewart	24,354	3.46
Democratic	Tom Hayden	13,532	1.92
Total votes		703,667	100

== Republican primary ==
Fob James defeated five other candidates for the Republican nomination.

=== Candidates ===
- Ann Bedsole, State Senator
- Winton Blount III, businessman and son of former Postmaster General Winton Blount
- Fob James, former Democratic Governor
- Mickey Kirkland, pastor
- Jack Pollard, candidate for governor in 1990
- Robin Swift, businessman

=== Results ===
Republican primary results
Party	Candidate	Votes	%
Republican	Fob James	84,021	39.54
Republican	Ann Bedsole	54,450	25.63
Republican	Winton Blount III	51,795	24.38
Republican	Mickey Kirkland	18,538	8.72
Republican	Robin Swift	3,138	1.48
Republican	Jack Pollard	543	0.26
Total votes		212,485	100.00

Republican runoff results
Party	Candidate	Votes	%
Republican	Fob James	130,233	62.44
Republican	Ann Bedsole	78,338	37.56
Total votes		208,571	100.00

== General election ==
=== Polling ===
Source	Date	Fob James (R)	Jim Folsom Jr. (D)
WSFA-TV	November 6, 1994	40%	47%
WALA-TV	October 23, 1994	38%	49%

=== Results ===
Folsom led in the polls during the campaign which showed him 10 to 12 percent ahead of James on the last weekend before the election. However, James pulled off a narrow upset victory in the election.

1994 Alabama gubernatorial election
Party	Candidate	Votes	%
Republican	Fob James	604,926	50.33
Democratic	Jim Folsom Jr. (incumbent)	594,169	49.43
Write-in		2,874	0.24
Total votes		1,201,969	100.00
Republican gain from Democratic			

Preceded by 1990 election	Gubernatorial election in Alabama; 1994	Succeeded by 1998 election
