= 1986 Alabama Attorney General election =

- November 4, 1986
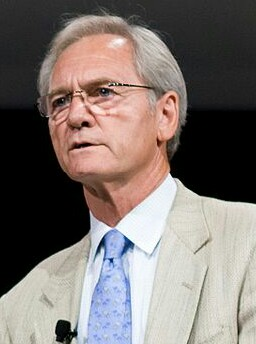
Candidate	Don Siegelman
Party	Democratic
Popular vote	769,948
Percentage	100.0%
- County results Siegelman: >90%
Attorney General before election
Charles A. Graddick
Democratic
Elected Attorney General
Don Siegelman
Democratic

The 1986 Alabama Attorney General election was held on November 4, 1986, to elect the Attorney General of Alabama to a four-year term.

== Democratic primary ==
=== Candidates ===
==== Nominee ====
- Don Siegelman, incumbent Secretary of State

==== Eliminated in primary ====
- Jimmy Evans, lawyer
- Reggie Sorrells
- Gerald Wallis

=== Results ===
Democratic primary
Party	Candidate	Votes	%
Democratic	Don Siegelman	444,992	53.91
Democratic	Jimmy Evans	256,072	31.02
Democratic	Reggie Sorrells	63,019	7.63
Democratic	Gerald Wallis	61,373	7.44
Total votes		825,456	100.00

== General election ==
=== Results ===
1986 Alabama Attorney General election
Party	Candidate	Votes	%
Democratic	Don Siegelman	769,948	100.00
Total votes		769,948	100.00
