= 1990 Alabama Attorney General election =

- November 6, 1990

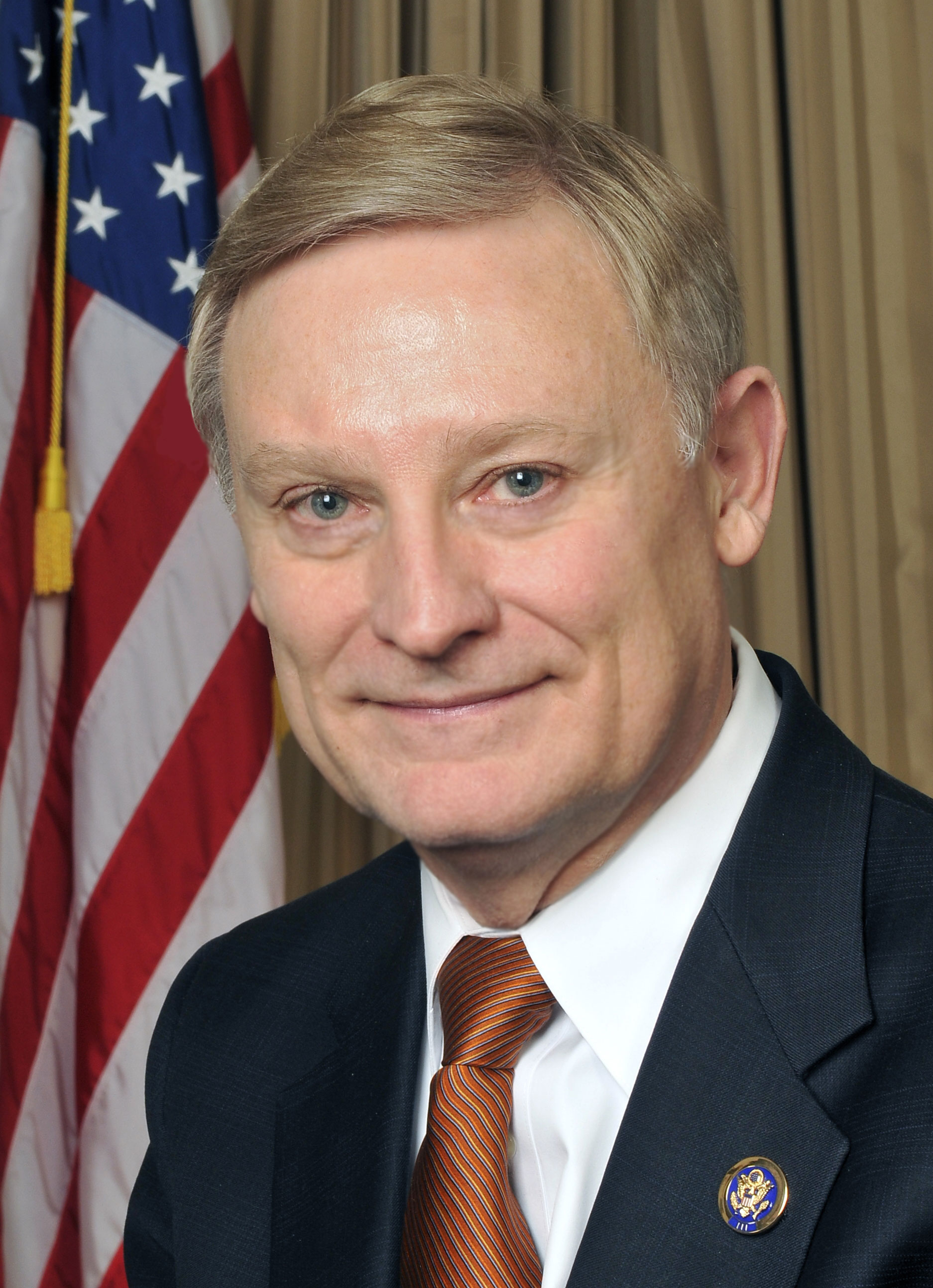
Candidate	Jimmy Evans	Spencer Bachus
Party	Democratic	Republican
Popular vote	726,982	401,388
Percentage	64.43%	35.57%
- County results Evans: 50–60% 60–70% 70–80% 80–90% >90% Bachus: 60–70%
Attorney General before election
Don Siegelman
Democratic
Elected Attorney General
Jimmy Evans
Democratic

The 1990 Alabama Attorney General election was held on November 6, 1990 to elect the Alabama Attorney General. Democratic incumbent Don Siegelman chose not to run for re-election, instead unsuccessfully running for governor. Democratic nominee Montgomery County District Attorney Jimmy Evans won the election in a landslide, defeating Republican Alabama State Board of Education member Spencer Bachus by 28 percentage points and winning every single county except for Shelby.

As of 2026, this is the last time a Democrat has been elected Alabama Attorney General.

== Democratic primary ==
=== Candidates ===
- Jimmy Evans, Montgomery County District Attorney
- Roger Bedford Jr., Alabama State Senator (1982–1990)
- Jim Sullivan, President of the Alabama Public Service Commission (1984–2008)

=== Primary results ===
Democratic primary results
Party	Candidate	Votes	%
Democratic	Roger Bedford Jr.	247,986	38.62%
Democratic	Jimmy Evans	242,599	37.78%
Democratic	Jim Sullivan	151,588	23.61%
Total votes		642,173	100.00%

=== Runoff results ===
Democratic primary runoff results
Party	Candidate	Votes	%
Democratic	Jimmy Evans	276,620	50.62%
Democratic	Roger Bedford Jr.	269,831	49.38%
Total votes		546,451	100.00%

== Republican primary ==
=== Candidates ===
- Spencer Bachus, member of the Alabama State Board of Education (1987–1991)

=== Results ===
Bachus was unopposed for the Republican nomination so no primary was held.

== General election ==
=== Candidates ===
- Jimmy Evans, Montgomery County District Attorney (Democratic)
- Spencer Bachus, member of the Alabama State Board of Education (1987–1991) (Republican)

=== Results ===
1990 Alabama Attorney General election results
Party	Candidate	Votes	%
Democratic	Jimmy Evans	726,982	64.43%
Republican	Spencer Bachus	401,388	35.57%
Total votes		1,128,370	100.00
Democratic hold			
