= 1994 Alabama lieutenant gubernatorial election =

- November 8, 1994
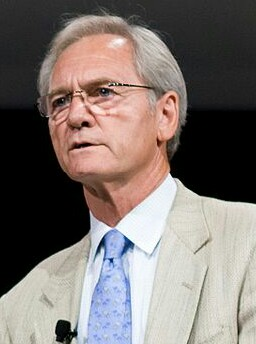

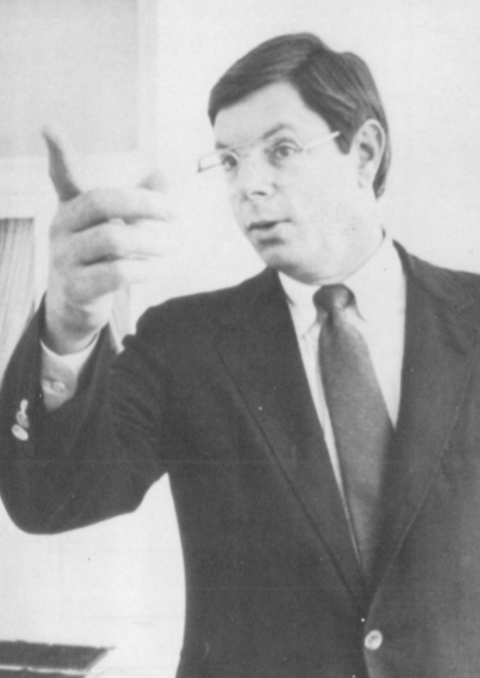
Nominee	Don Siegelman	Charles Graddick
Party	Democratic	Republican
Popular vote	732,285	442,707
Percentage	62.32%	37.68%
- County results Siegelman: 50–60% 60–70% 70–80% 80–90% Graddick: 50–60%
Lieutenant Governor before election
Vacant
Elected Lieutenant Governor
Don Siegelman
Democratic

The 1994 Alabama lieutenant gubernatorial election was held on November 8, 1994, in order to elect the lieutenant governor of Alabama. Democratic nominee and former Attorney General of Alabama Don Siegelman defeated Republican nominee and former Attorney General of Alabama Charles Graddick.

== Democratic primary ==
In the Democratic primary election, candidate and former Attorney General of Alabama Don Siegelman received a plurality of the votes (38.62%), thus advancing to a runoff against runner-up and incumbent President pro tempore of the Alabama Senate Ryan deGraffenried. Siegelman won the runoff with 57.32% and thus became the Democratic nominee for lieutenant governor.

=== First Round ===
1994 Democratic lieutenant gubernatorial primary
Party	Candidate	Votes	%
Democratic	Don Siegelman	273,621	38.62%
Democratic	Ryan deGraffenried	260,571	36.78%
Democratic	George Wallace Jr.	174,302	24.60%
Total votes		708,494	100.00%

=== Runoff ===
1994 Democratic lieutenant gubernatorial runoff
Party	Candidate	Votes	%
Democratic	Don Siegelman	297,937	57.32%
Democratic	Ryan deGraffenried	221,877	42.68%
Total votes		519,814	100.00%

== General election ==
On election day, November 8, 1994, Democratic nominee Don Siegelman won the election by a margin of 289,578 votes against his opponent Republican nominee Charles Graddick, thereby retaining Democratic control over the office of lieutenant governor. Siegelman was sworn in as the 26th lieutenant governor of Alabama on January 17, 1995.

=== Results ===
Alabama lieutenant gubernatorial election, 1994
Party	Candidate	Votes	%
Democratic	Don Siegelman	732,285	62.32
Republican	Charles Graddick	442,707	37.68
Total votes		1,174,992	100.00
Democratic hold			
