= 1994 Alabama Attorney General election =

- November 8, 1994
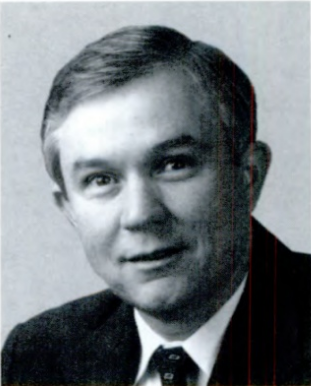

Candidate	Jeff Sessions	Jimmy Evans
Party	Republican	Democratic
Popular vote	666,910	505,137
Percentage	56.90%	43.10%
- County results Sessions: 50–60% 60–70% 70–80% Evans: 50–60% 60–70% 70–80% 80–90%
Attorney General before election
Jimmy Evans
Democratic
Elected Attorney General
Jeff Sessions
Republican

The 1994 Alabama Attorney General election was held on November 8, 1994 to elect the Alabama Attorney General. Democratic incumbent Jimmy Evans ran for re-election to a second term but lost by thirteen percentage points to Republican former United States Attorney for the Southern District of Alabama and future United States Attorney General Jeff Sessions.

== General election ==
=== Candidates ===
- Jimmy Evans, incumbent Alabama Attorney General (1991–1995) (Democratic)
- Jeff Sessions, former United States Attorney for the Southern District of Alabama (1981–1993) (Republican)

=== Results ===
1994 Alabama Attorney General election results
Party	Candidate	Votes	%	±%
Republican	Jeff Sessions	666,910	56.90%	+21.33%
Democratic	Jimmy Evans	505,137	43.10%	−21.33%
Total votes		1,172,047	100.00%	
Republican gain from Democratic				
