= Governor Folsom =

Governor Folsom may refer to:

- Jim Folsom (1908–1987), 42nd Governor of Alabama
- Jim Folsom Jr. (born 1949), 50th Governor of Alabama
