= 1978 Alabama gubernatorial election =

- November 7, 1978
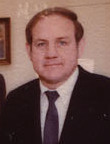

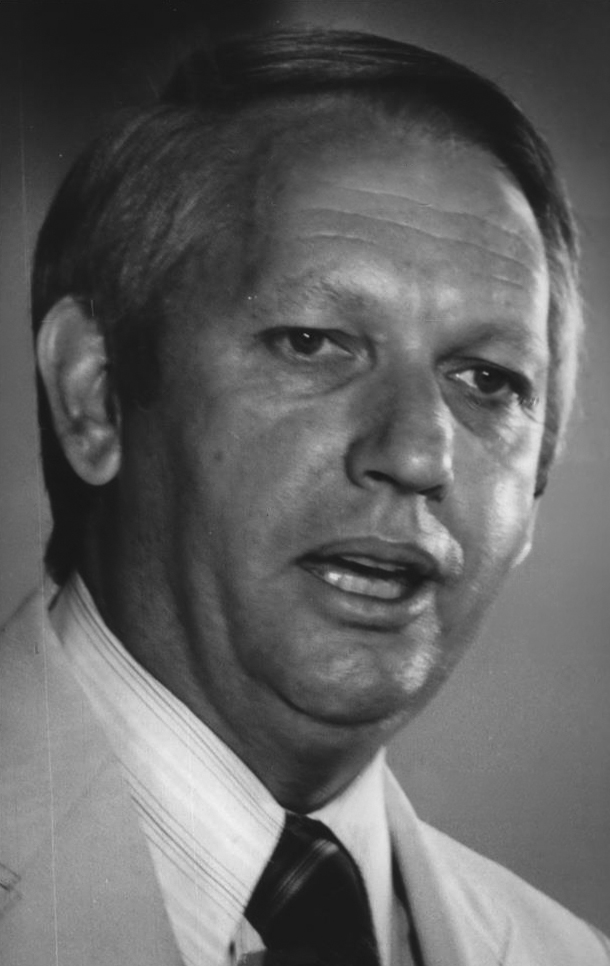
Nominee	Fob James	H. Guy Hunt
Party	Democratic	Republican
Popular vote	551,886	196,963
Percentage	72.59%	25.88%
- County results James: 40–50% 50–60% 60–70% 70–80% 80–90% >90% Hunt: 50–60% 60–70%
Governor before election
George Wallace
Democratic
Elected Governor
Fob James
Democratic

The 1978 Alabama gubernatorial election took place on November 7, 1978, to elect the governor of Alabama. Fob James, a businessman who had switched from the Republican Party to the Democratic Party and campaigned as a "born-again Democrat", won the Democratic primary in an upset over Attorney General Bill Baxley. He went on to defeat Guy Hunt in a landslide in the general election. Incumbent Democrat George Wallace was term limited and could not seek a third consecutive term; he later successfully ran again in 1982.

Hunt was the first Republican to win Cullman County since Reconstruction.

== Democratic primary ==
=== Candidates ===
- Bill Baxley, Attorney General of Alabama
- Jere Beasley, Lieutenant Governor
- Albert Brewer, former Governor
- Jim Folsom, former Governor
- K. C. Foster
- Horace Howell
- Fob James, businessman
- Sid McDonald, State Senator
- Bob Muncaster
- Shorty Price, perennial candidate
- Fred Sandefer
- Cornelia Wallace, former First Lady of Alabama
- Charles Woods, businessman and perennial candidate

=== Results ===
Despite entering the race as a former Republican with low name identification and little political experience, by the time of the primary, James led Baxley, Beasley, and Brewer, who were considered the main contenders, in the polls. James placed first in the primary, followed by Baxley. Fob James then won the primary runoff against Bill Baxley.

Primary results by county James: 50–60% 60–70% 70–80% Baxley: 50–60% 60–70%

Democratic primary results
Party	Candidate	Votes	%
Democratic	Fob James	256,196	28.47
Democratic	Bill Baxley	210,089	23.35
Democratic	Albert Brewer	193,479	21.50
Democratic	Sid McDonald	143,930	15.99
Democratic	Jere Beasley	77,202	8.58
Democratic	K. C. Foster	4,948	0.55
Democratic	Horace Howell	4,730	0.53
Democratic	Jim Folsom	4,632	0.52
Democratic	Bob Muncaster	1,776	0.20
Democratic	Shorty Price	1,396	0.16
Democratic	Charles Woods	700	0.08
Democratic	Fred Sandefer	622	0.07
Democratic	Cornelia Wallace	217	0.02
Total votes		899,917	100

Democratic runoff results
Party	Candidate	Votes	%
Democratic	Fob James	515,520	55.17
Democratic	Bill Baxley	418,932	44.83
Total votes		934,452	100

== Republican primary ==
=== Candidates ===
- Guy Hunt, former Cullman County Probate Judge

=== Results ===
Republican primary results
Party	Candidate	Votes	%
Republican	Guy Hunt	21,499	83.17
Republican	Bert Hayes	2,817	10.90
Republican	Julian Elgin	1,534	5.93
Total votes		25,850	100

== General election ==
=== Results ===
1978 Alabama gubernatorial election
Party	Candidate	Votes	%
Democratic	Fob James	551,886	72.59
Republican	Guy Hunt	196,693	25.88
Prohibition	Jim Partain	8,103	1.07
Determination	Richard Dare	3,522	0.46
Total votes		760,104	100
Democratic hold			

Fob James won all but two counties: Cullman, where Hunt had been Probate Judge; and Winston, a traditionally Republican stronghold.
