= Jim Folsom Jr. =

American politician (born 1949)

Jim Folsom
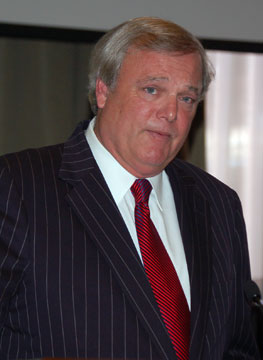
- Folsom in 2009

50th Governor of Alabama
- In office April 22, 1993 – January 16, 1995
- Lieutenant: Vacant
- Preceded by: Guy Hunt
- Succeeded by: Fob James

25th and 29th Lieutenant Governor of Alabama
- In office January 15, 2007 – January 17, 2011
- Governor: Bob Riley
- Preceded by: Lucy Baxley
- Succeeded by: Kay Ivey
- In office January 19, 1987 – April 22, 1993
- Governor: Guy Hunt
- Preceded by: Bill Baxley
- Succeeded by: Don Siegelman

31st Chair of the National Lieutenant Governors Association
- In office 1990–1991
- Preceded by: Bobby Brantley
- Succeeded by: Scott McCallum

Personal details
- Born: James Elisha Folsom Jr. May 14, 1949 (age 77) Montgomery, Alabama, U.S.
- Party: Democratic
- Spouse: Marsha Guthrie
- Education: Jacksonville State University (BA)

Military service
- Allegiance: United States
- Branch/service: United States Army
- Years of service: 1968–1970
- Unit: Alabama National Guard

James Elisha Folsom Jr. (born May 14, 1949) is an American politician who was the 50th governor of Alabama from April 22, 1993, to January 16, 1995. He has also served as the 25th and 29th lieutenant governor of Alabama. He is a member of the Democratic Party.

As of 2026, he is the most recent Democrat to have served as Alabama's Lieutenant Governor.

== Early life and education ==
Born in Montgomery, Alabama, he is the son of former First Lady of Alabama Jamelle Folsom and two-term Alabama Governor James E. "Big Jim" Folsom Sr. Folsom Jr. is therefore known as "Little Jim" even though he is well over six feet tall. In 1974, he graduated from Jacksonville State University, where he presently serves as a trustee.

== Early career ==
During his first run for a political office, he lost the primary to incumbent Democratic Congressman Tom Bevill by an overwhelming margin. However he was elected to the Alabama Public Service Commission in 1978.

Folsom unlike his father was a moderate-to-conservative Democrat. He won support from groups his father had long opposed, especially a group of conservative business people known as the Big Mules. In 1980, Folsom ran for the U.S. Senate and attacked the incumbent, Donald W. Stewart, as being too liberal for Alabama and called him a "puppet of the great Washington power structure." Although Stewart outspent Folsom $500,000 to $75,000, he very narrowly missed winning a majority in the primary and Folsom won the runoff. In the general election, Folsom lost by a narrow margin to Republican Jeremiah Denton, who was aided by the Ronald Reagan landslide, which helped Republican candidates across the country.

Folsom was re-elected to the Alabama Public Service Commission in 1982.

Folsom was elected Alabama Lieutenant Governor and served from January 19, 1987, to April 22, 1993 (being re-elected in 1990). During both terms, as a matter of law, Folsom was also President and Presiding Officer of the Alabama State Senate. He served under Governor H. Guy Hunt, the first Republican Alabama Governor since Reconstruction. Hunt and Folsom also happen to be from the same (Cullman) county. Folsom also was a member of the National Association of Lieutenant Governors.

== Governorship ==
In 1993, Hunt was convicted of state ethics law violations regarding the funding of Hunt's second inaugural ceremonies. As in most states, Alabama's constitution prohibits convicted felons from serving in office. As a result, Hunt was forced to resign on April 22, 1993, and Folsom automatically became governor.

Only weeks after Folsom assumed office, state officials were approached by Mercedes-Benz about the possibility of locating its first manufacturing plant outside its native Germany in Alabama. Over the following months, Folsom led Alabama's efforts to recruit the facility, culminating in an October 1993 announcement that Alabama had beaten 30 other states for the coveted facility. The prestige of the Mercedes plant opened the door for future automotive plants to locate in the state.

Within six days after taking office Governor Folsom ordered the removal of the Confederate flag from the state capitol to a memorial. His de facto Chief of Staff was his longtime friend and confidant, Charlie Waldrep, an attorney at Waldrep, Stewart & Kendrick, LLC. Governor Folsom also appointed a number of African Americans and women to his staff.

In 1994, Folsom ran for a full four-year term. Although some regarded him as a popular governor, three candidates challenged him in the Democratic primary, the most serious being Paul Hubbert, the executive secretary of the Alabama Education Association and nominee for governor in 1990. After a fierce and sometimes nasty primary, Folsom fended off Hubbert's challenge with 54% of the vote. But Hubbert's primary challenge damaged Folsom, who in the general election was narrowly defeated by former Democratic Governor Fob James, who was running as a Republican. Even though 1994 was a tough year for Democrats and that Folsom was facing a popular former governor in James and had spent a lot of money to win his primary against Hubbert, the result was close. Folsom lost to James by 10,757 votes (50.3% to 49.4%).

Compared to other prominent Democratic incumbent Governors who lost that year such as Ann Richards in Texas, Bruce King in New Mexico, and Mario Cuomo in New York, Folsom ran much more strongly than they did. He also ran stronger than Democratic nominees in other Southern states with governor's races, such as Phil Bredesen in Tennessee (who eventually was elected there in 2002), Jack Mildren in Oklahoma, and Nick Theodore in South Carolina.

== Post-governorship and return to politics ==
In 2006, Folsom re-entered state politics, running again as the Democratic nominee for lieutenant governor. He won the Democratic nomination unopposed, and in the general election, he narrowly defeated Republican lawyer Luther Strange for a third, nonconsecutive four-year term. Folsom is the longest-serving lieutenant governor in Alabama history with 10 years of service; his third term ended on January 17, 2011.

Folsom endorsed former U.S. Senator Bill Bradley of New Jersey in the 2000 Democratic presidential primaries, Governor of Vermont Howard Dean in 2004 Democratic presidential primaries, and U.S. Senator and future President Barack Obama of Illinois in the 2008 Democratic presidential primaries. In 2016, he was a strong supporter of former Governor of Maryland Martin O'Malley for president.

He announced on April 1, 2009, that he would seek re-election as Lieutenant Governor in 2010 rather than run for the Democratic nomination for governor. On November 2, 2010, Folsom was defeated by three percentage points in his re-election bid for a fourth term by the Republican nominee, Kay Ivey. Folsom explored a potential 2018 bid for governor.

Folsom is married to Marsha Guthrie. They have two children. He is an Episcopalian.

== Electoral history ==
Democratic primary for the U.S. House of Representatives – AL 4th district, 1976

- Tom Bevill (Inc.) – 90,168 (80.87%)
- Jim Folsom Jr. – 21,335 (19.13%)

Democratic primary for the United States Senate, 1980

- Donald W. Stewart (Inc.) – 222,540 (48.63%)
- Jim Folsom Jr. – 163,196 (35.67%)
- Finis St. John – 51,260 (11.20%)
- Margaret E. Stewart – 20,582 (4.50%)

Democratic runoff for the United States Senate, 1980

- Jim Folsom Jr. – 204,186 (50.60%)
- Donald W. Stewart – 199,365 (49.40%)

United States Senate election in Alabama, 1980

- Jeremiah Denton (R) – 650,363 (50.15%)
- Jim Folsom Jr. (D) – 610,175 (47.05%)

Democratic primary for lieutenant governor, 1986

- Jim Folsom Jr. – 331,527 (37.72%)
- John Teague – 277,899 (31.62%)
- Hinton Mitchem – 203,112 (23.11%)
- Melba Till Allen – 66,439 (7.56%)

Democratic runoff for lieutenant governor, 1986

- Jim Folsom Jr. – 517,724 (57.49%)
- John Teague – 382,836 (42.51)

Election for lieutenant governor, 1986

- Jim Folsom Jr. (D) – 726,111 (61.85%)
- Don McGriff (R) – 447,978 (38.16%)

Democratic primary for lieutenant governor, 1990

- Jim Folsom Jr. (Inc.) – 510,814 (80.87%)
- William McKinley Branch – 120,861 (19.13%)

Election for lieutenant governor, 1990

- Jim Folsom Jr. (D) (Inc.) – 768,988 (67.33%)
- Bob McKee (R) – 373,072 (32.67%)

Democratic primary for governor, 1994

- Jim Folsom Jr. (Inc.) – 380,227 (54.04%)
- Paul R. Hubbert – 285,554 (40.59%)
- Margaret E. Stewart – 24,254 (3.45%)
- Tom Hayden – 13,532 (1.92%)

Alabama gubernatorial election, 1994

- Fob James (R) – 604,926 (50.33%)
- Jim Folsom Jr. (D) (Inc.) – 594,169 (49.43%)

Democratic primary for lieutenant governor, 2006

- Jim Folsom Jr. – unopposed

Election for lieutenant governor, 2006

- Jim Folsom Jr. (D) – 629,268 (50.61%)
- Luther Strange (R) – 610,982 (49.14%)
- Write-in candidates – 3,029 (0.24%)

Election for lieutenant governor, 2010

- Kay Ivey (R) – 764,112 (51.47%)
- Jim Folsom Jr. (D) – 718,636 (48.40%)
- Write-in candidates – 1,945 (0.13%)

Party political offices
Preceded by Donald Stewart	Democratic nominee for U.S. Senator from Alabama (Class 1); 1980	Succeeded by Richard Shelby
Preceded by Bill Baxley	Democratic nominee for Lieutenant Governor of Alabama; 1986, 1990	Succeeded by Don Siegelman
Preceded by Paul Hubbert	Democratic nominee for Governor of Alabama; 1994	Succeeded by Don Siegelman
Preceded by Lucy Baxley	Democratic nominee for Lieutenant Governor of Alabama; 2006, 2010	Succeeded by James Fields
Political offices
Preceded by Bill Baxley	Lieutenant Governor of Alabama; 1987–1993	Succeeded by Don Siegelman
Preceded by Guy Hunt	Governor of Alabama; 1993–1995	Succeeded by Fob James
Preceded by Lucy Baxley	Lieutenant Governor of Alabama; 2007–2011	Succeeded by Kay Ivey
U.S. order of precedence (ceremonial)
Preceded by Fob James as Former Governor	Order of precedence of the United States	Succeeded by Don Siegelman as Former Governor
