= 1998 Alabama gubernatorial election =

- November 3, 1998
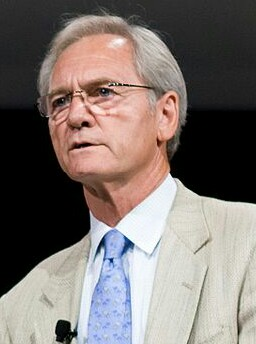

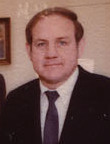
Nominee	Don Siegelman	Fob James
Party	Democratic	Republican
Popular vote	752,087	546,504
Percentage	57.92%	42.08%
- County results Siegelman: 50–60% 60–70% 70–80% 80–90% James: 50–60%
Governor before election
Fob James
Republican
Elected Governor
Don Siegelman
Democratic

The 1998 Alabama gubernatorial election was held on November 3, 1998. The election saw incumbent Governor Fob James (R) face off against Lieutenant Governor Don Siegelman (D), resulting in Siegelman winning more than 57% of votes. This was the second of three consecutive Alabama gubernatorial elections where the incumbent was defeated. As of 2026, this was the last time that a Democrat was elected governor of Alabama, and the only time since 1982.

== Republican primary ==
The Republican primary took place on June 2 and saw no candidate secure over 50% of the vote, leading to a runoff between Fob James and Winton Blount on June 30. The period leading up to the runoff election was marked by numerous insults and accusations by both candidates against each other. Incumbent Governor Fob James won the runoff 55% to 44%.

=== Candidates ===
- Winton Blount, businessman, 1994 candidate for governor and son of former U.S. postmaster general Winton M. Blount
- Guy Hunt, former governor
- Fob James, incumbent governor since 1995
- Mac McAllister, businessman
- Phil Williams Sr., former director of the Alabama Department of Finance

=== Results ===
James: 40–50%; 50–60%; 60–70%; 70–80%; Blount: 40–50%; 50–60%; Hunt: 30–40%

Republican primary results
Party	Candidate	Votes	%
Republican	Fob James (incumbent)	163,711	47.96
Republican	Winton Blount	139,941	40.99
Republican	Guy Hunt	27,824	8.15
Republican	Mac McAllister	5,641	1.65
Republican	Phil Williams	4,258	1.25
Total votes		341,375	100.00

=== Debate ===
1998 Alabama gubernatorial election republican primary debate
No.	Date	Host	Moderator	Link	Republican	Republican
Key: P Participant A Absent N Not invited I Invited W Withdrawn						
Key: P Participant A Absent N Not invited I Invited W Withdrawn					Winton Blount	Fob James
1	Jun. 25, 1998	WVTM-TV	Fran Curry	C-SPAN	P	P

James: 50–60%; 60–70%; 70–80%; Blount: 50–60%

Republican primary runoff results
Party	Candidate	Votes	%
Republican	Fob James (incumbent)	253,965	55.92
Republican	Winton Blount	200,200	44.08
Total votes		454,165	100.00

== Democratic primary ==
The Democratic primary took place on June 2 and saw Lieutenant Governor Don Siegelman easily chosen as the Democratic nominee over Birmingham attorney Lenora Pate and Wayne Sowell.

=== Candidates ===
- Lee Lamb
- Lenora Pate, attorney and former director of the Alabama Department of Industrial Relations
- Don Siegelman, lieutenant governor of Alabama

=== Results ===
Democratic primary results
Party	Candidate	Votes	%
Democratic	Don Siegelman	254,507	78.26
Democratic	Lenora Pate	53,618	16.49
Democratic	Wayne Sowell	10,108	3.11
Democratic	Lee Lamb	6,597	2.03
Total votes		325,190	100.00

== General election ==
=== Candidates ===
- Fob James, incumbent governor since 1995 (Republican)
- Don Siegelman, lieutenant governor of Alabama (Democratic)

=== Polling ===
Poll source	Date(s) administered	Sample size (Note: Key: A – all adults RV – registered voters LV – likely voters V – unclear)	Margin of error	Fob James (R)	Don Siegelman (D)	Other / undecided (Note: Calculated by taking the difference of 100% and all other candidates combined.)
Southern Opinion Research	October 29–31, 1998	490 (LV)	± 5.0%	45%	53%	12%
Mason-Dixon Polling & Strategy	October 29–31, 1998	490 (LV)	± 5.0%	45%	53%	12%
University of South Alabama (Note: Poll sponsored by The Birmingham News, The Mobile Register, and The Huntsville Times)	October 26–29, 1998	820 (LV)	± 3.5%	36%	52%	12%
Mason-Dixon Polling & Strategy	October 24–26, 1998	808 (LV)	± 3.5%	43%	49%	8%
Southern Opinion Research	October 22, 1998	500	—	35%	60%	5%
University of South Alabama	October 21, 1998	820	—	32%	46%	22%
Mason-Dixon Polling & Strategy	October 10–12, 1998	807 (LV)	± 3.5%	43%	48%	9%
University of Alabama at Birmingham	October 7–11, 1998	401 (LV)	± 5.0%	39%	46%	15%
USA Polling Group (Note: Poll sponsored by The Mobile Register)	October 5–7, 1998	400 (A)	± 5.0%	40%	52%	8%
Southern Opinion Research	October 1–2, 1998	501 (RV)	± 5.0%	39%	52%	9%
Southern Opinion Research	September 3–4, 1998	500 (RV)	± 4.4%	44%	48%	8%
USA Polling Group	September 1–3, 1998	405 (A)	± 5.0%	40%	48%	12%
Southern Opinion Research	June 23–26, 1998	1,019 (RV)	± 3.0%	41%	51%	8%
Mason-Dixon Polling & Strategy	June 22–24, 1998	804 (LV)	± 3.5%	41%	46%	13%
USA Polling Group	June 8–11, 1998	800 (A)	± 3.5%	35%	36%	29%

=== Debate ===
1998 Alabama gubernatorial debate
No.	Date	Host	Moderator	Link	Republican	Democratic
Key: P Participant A Absent N Not invited I Invited W Withdrawn						
Key: P Participant A Absent N Not invited I Invited W Withdrawn					Fob James	Don Siegelman
1	Oct. 6, 1998	Junior League of Birmingham	Malena Cunningham	C-SPAN	P	P

=== Results ===
1998 Alabama gubernatorial election
Party	Candidate	Votes	%	±%
Democratic	Don Siegelman	752,087	57.92	+8.5
Republican	Fob James (incumbent)	546,504	42.08	−8.2
Total votes		1,298,591	100.00	N/A
Democratic gain from Republican				

== Notes ==
Partisan clients
