= 1986 Alabama gubernatorial election =

- November 4, 1986
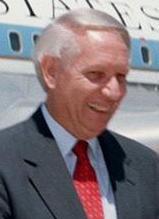

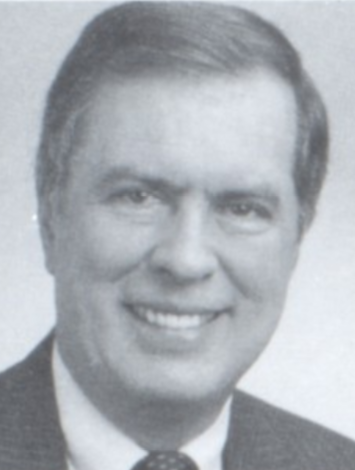
Nominee	H. Guy Hunt	Bill Baxley
Party	Republican	Democratic
Popular vote	696,203	537,163
Percentage	56.45%	43.55%
- County results Hunt: 50–60% 60–70% 70–80% Baxley: 50–60% 60–70% 70–80% 80–90%
Governor before election
George Wallace
Democratic
Elected Governor
H. Guy Hunt
Republican

The 1986 Alabama gubernatorial election saw the election of Republican H. Guy Hunt over Democrat Bill Baxley. In state politics, this election is largely seen as a realigning election since Hunt was the first Republican to be elected governor in 114 years – the last Republican to be elected was David P. Lewis in 1872 during the Reconstruction era. In March 1986, incumbent George Wallace announced that he would not seek a fifth term as governor, ending an era in Alabama politics.

Though Alabama had supported Republicans in national elections, state and local elections were dominated by Democrats. Therefore many people anticipated that the winner of the Democratic primary would win the election.

== Democratic primary ==
=== Candidates ===
- Bill Baxley, Lieutenant Governor
- Charles Graddick, Attorney General of Alabama
- Fob James, former governor
- George McMillan, former lieutenant governor and candidate for governor in 1982
- Barbara E. O'Neal

=== Results ===
Democratic primary results
Party	Candidate	Votes	%
Democratic	Bill Baxley	345,985	36.80
Democratic	Charlie Graddick	275,714	29.33
Democratic	Fob James	195,844	20.83
Democratic	George McMillan	117,258	12.47
Democratic	Barbara E. O'Neal	5,287	0.56
Total votes		940,088	100.00

Democratic runoff results
Party	Candidate	Votes	%
Democratic	Charlie Graddick	470,051	50.47
Democratic	Bill Baxley	461,295	49.53
Total votes		931,346	100.00

=== Controversy ===
The Democratic primary brought out a number of candidates. It resulted in a runoff between Lieutenant Governor Bill Baxley and Attorney General Charles Graddick. Graddick, the more conservative of the two Democrats, won the runoff election by a slim margin. Baxley challenged the results, and claimed that Graddick violated Democratic Party rules by encouraging people who voted in the Republican primary to cross over and vote in the Democratic runoff election.

While Republicans in the state have held open primaries for years, the Democrats bar Republicans and Independents from voting in its primary election. This challenge went to the Alabama Supreme Court, which ruled that crossover voting had taken place in large numbers and that the Democratic Party either had to select Baxley as the nominee or hold another runoff election. The party opted to name Baxley as its nominee.

== General election and aftermath ==
=== Results ===
1986 Alabama gubernatorial election
Party	Candidate	Votes	%
Republican	Guy Hunt	696,203	56.45
Democratic	Bill Baxley	537,163	43.55
Total votes		1,233,366	100.00
Republican gain from Democratic			

The selection of Baxley spurned a negative reaction from Graddick's supporters. As a result, they supported Guy Hunt in the general election, who won with 56 percent of the vote.

This election marked the transformation of politics in Alabama from a state dominated by many perspectives in one party to a two-party state.
