= Toforest Johnson =

Prisoner on Alabama's death row

- 2019 mugshot of Toforest Johnson
- Born: Toforest Onesha Johnson; February 8, 1973 (age 53); Birmingham, Alabama, U.S.
- Status: Incarcerated
- Conviction: Capital murder
- Penalty: Death, commuted to life imprisonment without parole

Details
- Victims: William Hardy, 49
- Date: July 19, 1995
- Country: United States
- State: Alabama
- Imprisoned at: Holman Correctional Facility

Toforest Onesha Johnson (born February 8, 1973) is an American man formerly on death row for the 1995 murder of Jefferson County deputy sheriff William G. Hardy in Alabama. Johnson's case is controversial and his quest for a new trial has attracted widespread support, from prominent lawyers such as the original prosecutor in his case and Alabama's former attorney general to celebrities such as Kim Kardashian.

Johnson was convicted based on the testimony of a single witness, Violet Ellison, who allegedly overheard Johnson confessing to the murder during a jailhouse phone call she eavesdropped on. It was later revealed that Ellison was paid $5,000 for her testimony, unbeknownst to Johnson's lawyers. Johnson's lawyers have also presented alibi evidence showing that Johnson and a friend, Ardragus Ford, were together at a nightclub miles away when the murder happened. Many, including current Jefferson County District Attorney Danny Carr and Johnson's original trial prosecutor Jeff Wallace, former Chief Justice of the Alabama Supreme Court Drayton Nabers Jr., former Alabama Attorney General Bill Baxley, and many Alabama legal, civil rights, and faith organizations, have publicly called for Johnson's conviction to be overturned.

On October 20, 2026, citing the thin evidence against him, Governor Kay Ivey commuted Johnson's sentence to life imprisonment without the possibility of parole. He remains incarcerated at the Holman Correctional Facility.

== Personal life ==
Toforest Onesha Johnson was born in Birmingham, Alabama on February 8, 1973. Johnson mostly grew up in Birmingham's Pratt City neighborhood but moved to Birmingham's Ensley community when he was 16. Johnson has one younger brother and five children.

Johnson's children have been on the forefront of advocacy for their father to get a new trial. Johnson's oldest daughter, Shanaye Poole, has also spoken out about her family's advocacy on behalf of her father. In a 2019 article, Poole is quoted as saying about her father: "He’d rather think of the positive outcomes than the negative. That could eat away at a person, but I think he’s just maintained his faith and he knows that he is an innocent man."

Following Governor Ivey's commutation of Johnson's sentence to life without parole, Johnson's daughter Akeriya "Muffin" Terry vowed to continue fighting for her father's release, saying, "This is just the beginning."

== Murder of William G. Hardy ==
On July 19, 1995, between 12:30 a.m. and 1:00 a.m., a 49-year-old off-duty deputy sheriff, William G. Hardy, was murdered outside a hotel in Birmingham, Alabama.

That night, Barry Rushakoff, the night manager of the hotel, heard two pop-like sounds echoing outside the hotel. He attempted to contact Hardy over the radio to ask Hardy to check the source of the sounds. However, Hardy did not respond. Later, Rushakoff received calls from several hotel guests who reported hearing gunshots in the parking lot. He called 911 to report the shots and request backup for Hardy. Rushakoff again attempted to reach Hardy via radio, but without success. Several guests of the hotel, including Larry Osborne and Annie Colvin (who later became trial witnesses), testified that they were awakened by gunshot sounds that night.

Rushakoff proceeded to the back of the hotel. On his way, he passed a table in the atrium where Hardy frequently sat, noticing the deputy's radio, a cup of coffee, and a cigarette still smoldering in an ashtray. When Rushakoff reached the glass doors at the rear of the hotel, he discovered Hardy's body in the parking lot. He returned to the front desk and called 911 again to report the deputy had been injured. While on the phone with 911, a hotel guest, Leon Colvin (husband of Annie Colvin), approached the desk to ask about car keys that his stepson, Michael Ansley, was supposed to have left for him earlier. Rushakoff gave Colvin the keys, then completed the 911 call and waited for the police. Rushakoff stated that, while waiting, he did not see anyone else in the parking lot except for Hardy, who was later pronounced dead at a nearby hospital. At the time of his death, Hardy was a deputy sheriff in Jefferson County.

Dr. Robert Brissie, chief medical examiner for Jefferson County, conducted the autopsy. Dr. Brissie certified that the cause of Hardy's death was two gunshots. He added that the gunshot wound to Hardy's forehead and the exit hole in both Hardy's hat and back of his head suggested that one of the two bullets was delivered about 12 to 20 inches away from Hardy's forehead and at approximately a 15-degree upward angle. Ballistics evidence confirmed the two shots were fired from the same gun, establishing that there was only one shooter.

At around 4 a.m. on that same day, police stopped a car at a motel several miles from the crime scene. In the car were four African-American people (two men and two women), one of whom was 22-year-old Toforest Johnson and another was his 21-year-old paraplegic friend Ardragus Ford, while the other two were Latanya Henderson and Yolanda Chambers. Johnson was arrested at the scene due to an outstanding traffic warrant and the other three people were allowed to go home.

Johnson and three other men were later arrested for Hardy's murder. One was Ford; the other two were 22-year-old Omar Rahman Berry and 20-year-old Quintez Wilson. The four men were all charged with capital murder, an offense that carries either life imprisonment without the possibility of parole, or the death penalty under Alabama state law. The four were later indicted by a grand jury in March 1996. At the grand jury, the District Attorney presented the sworn testimony of the lead detective in the case, who told the grand jurors that police investigation had revealed that Berry and Ford shot Hardy.

== Murder trials ==
Two years later, Toforest Johnson and Ardragus Ford faced separate trials for Hardy's murder, while prosecutors dropped all charges against both Omar Berry and Quintez Wilson. More than a decade after his release, Wilson died in 2008 from a shooting incident that left two men dead.

Johnson and Ford were each tried twice. Prosecutors argued different theories at each of the four trials. These theories were all different from the theory of the murder that the District Attorney presented at the grand jury in January 1996.

The prosecution tried Ardragus Ford first. Prior to Ford's trial, the District Attorney, David Barber, told Ford's lawyer that he did not think Ford was the killer and agreed to give Ford complete immunity if Ford would implicate Toforest Johnson. Ford told his attorney that if it were true that Toforest Johnson committed the crime, he would say so "in a heartbeat," but refused to lie and so the trial went forward, with Ford facing the death penalty. At Ford's trial, prosecutors relied on the testimony of Yolanda Chambers, who testified that she saw Ford kill Deputy Hardy. Prosecutors told the jury that Chambers had lied in the past, but was telling the truth now. However, prosecutors would go on to argue "a completely different theory" of the crime in Johnson's subsequent trial. In the meantime, Ford's trial ended with a hung jury with a 10–2 vote in favor of acquittal in November 1997.

One month after Ford's first trial, Johnson's first trial began. However, prosecutors no longer argued that Ford shot Deputy Hardy and instead argued that Johnson was the one who fired the fatal shots. Prosecutors now relied on information from a woman named Violet Ellison who testified that her daughter was dating an inmate at the county jail and her daughter would make three-way calls for her boyfriend. Ellison said she picked up the phone on one of these occasions and heard someone identify themselves as "Toforest" and say that he shot Hardy and also said that Quintez Wilson fired the other shot. Notably, this did not match evidence at the crime scene, which showed the bullets were fired from the same gun. This also did not match the prosecution's theory in either Ford's or Johnson's trial that the shooter acted alone. Johnson's first trial, like Ford's, ended in a mistrial because the jury did not unanimously find the defendant guilty.

The next year, the prosecution tried both Ford and Johnson once again. At Johnson's retrial, prosecutors again relied on Violet Ellison as their only evidence that Johnson was connected to the murder. No physical or forensic evidence tied Johnson to the murder. In defense, Johnson's lawyers called two alibi witnesses who put Johnson at Tee's Place, a nightclub on the other side of town, at the time of the crime. Johnson's attorneys also called Yolanda Chambers to testify that Johnson was at the crime scene but did not commit the murder. The prosecution argued to the jury that Chambers was a liar and unreliable witness. Chambers' testimony conflicted with the alibi witnesses Johnson's lawyers called. The jury convicted Johnson of capital murder on August 23, 1998, and later, by a vote of 10–2, the jury recommended the death penalty. Johnson was sentenced to death on October 30, 1998.

In Ford's retrial, the prosecution changed their prosecution theory again and relied on Yolanda Chambers, who they had previously called "a liar" during Johnson's second trial. Prosecutors eventually stipulated that Chambers lied to law enforcement about the crime "at least 300 times." The jury voted to acquit Ardragus Ford on June 13, 1999.

== Appeal process ==
On June 29, 2001, the Alabama Court of Criminal Appeals affirmed Toforest Johnson's murder conviction and death sentence on direct appeal.

Johnson's first state post-conviction petition was litigated over the course of many years, with the state appellate court sending the case back to the trial court for hearings on three different occasions. Specifically, on September 28, 2007, the Alabama Court of Criminal Appeals reversed the lower court's summary dismissal of Johnson's post-conviction petition and sent the case back to the lower court for a hearing. On June 14, 2013, the Alabama Court of Criminal Appeals again reversed the lower court and sent the case back to the trial court for further hearings. On August 14, 2015, the trial court's denial of Johnson's post-conviction petition was affirmed by the Alabama Court of Criminal Appeals.

On June 26, 2017, the U.S. Supreme Court, in a 5-4 ruling, found in favor of Johnson, and sent the case back to the state courts for re-hearing after the state courts had refused to consider Johnson's claim that prosecutors had failed to disclose that the State's primary witness at trial, Violet Ellison, had been secretly paid $5000 for her testimony. On May 6, 2022, after judge Teresa Pulliam denied his prosecutorial misconduct claim, the Alabama Court of Criminal Appeals affirmed the ruling on appeal. On December 16, 2022, the Alabama Supreme Court denied Johnson's petition for review and declined to hear the case.

Johnson petitioned for review to the U.S. Supreme Court in April 2023. On October 2, 2023, the U.S. Supreme Court declined to hear Johnson's petition.

On November 14, 2024, Johnson filed a new petition to the Jefferson County Circuit Court for a fresh review of his case. The petition is currently pending in front of Circuit Judge Kandice Pickett.

== Claim of innocence ==
Over the years while he was incarcerated on death row, Toforest Johnson's case has become controversial due to the fact that an increasing number of prominent legal figures in Alabama believe that he is innocent or at least should be entitled to a new trial. A lesser known ground of the controversy is the alleged ineffective legal representation Johnson received during his trial.

=== Credibility of Violet Ellison ===
Most of the concerns raised about Johnson's conviction focus on Violet Ellison, who said she overheard Johnson confess to the murder on a three-way jailhouse phone call. Because no physical evidence or eyewitness testimony links Johnson to the murder, the State's case at trial relied on Ellison's credibility. Many have commented on how thin the evidence against Johnson was, given that Ellison did not know Johnson previously and had never heard his voice.

A major argument to overturn Johnson's conviction has centered on the fact that prosecutors did not disclose for almost two decades that Ellison had received a payment of $5,000 from the prosecution for her testimony, which was never disclosed to Johnson's trial lawyers.

In 2023, the investigative podcast Earwitness revealed that Ellison was also a State's witness in a number of other cases, including during the time she was the State's key witness against Johnson. In one of those cases, which took place just months after Ellison testified against Johnson, the defendant Murika Wilson was acquitted. Wilson told Beth Shelburne, host of Earwitness, that Ellison "lied under oath. Literally. Literally lied under oath."

Shelburne also spoke to Ellison's grandchildren for the Earwitness podcast. Ellison's granddaughter said on the podcast that Ellison is "money-hungry. So that's the issue. [She w]ill, like I said, will say anything to get money." Ellison's grandson also spoke to Shelburne and appeared on the podcast. He said of his grandmother: "I can tell you one thing about my grandmother. She is a, that's a true scam artist. That's a true -- I hate to say. I know it's my grandmother, but that's a true scam artist there. Anyway, she can get a dollar. I'm telling you, she ain't the type that just going to help somebody just to help them. It got to have money involved. It just have to, it got to -- it ain't got money involved? She ain't with it."

=== Alibi witnesses ===
Another major point of Johnson's case was that several witnesses have testified that Johnson was not at the scene of crime when Hardy was killed, and that he was at another location when Hardy was killed.

=== Inconsistent theories ===
The fact that prosecutors could not decide on a theory of the murder has also called Johnson's conviction into doubt. In Episode 5 of the Earwitness podcast, host Beth Shelburne "walks listeners through one of the most shocking aspects of this case: in five different court proceedings, prosecutors presented five different, mutually exclusive theories about how Deputy Hardy was killed."

== Support for a new trial ==
The concerns about the validity of Johnson's conviction has led many to call for his conviction to be overturned. Many civil groups, including the Innocence Project, have urged courts to overturn his conviction.

Johnson's quest for a new trial has also garnered support from a wide array of lawyers and legal organizations, who believe Johnson's conviction is flawed. The most prominent of these is the current elected Jefferson County District Attorney, Danny Carr, a longtime supporter of capital punishment, whose call for Johnson's conviction to be overturned has been joined by Jeff Wallace, the lead prosecutor at Johnson's trial.

Carr's office submitted a brief in 2020 supporting Johnson's request for a new trial. Although Carr expressed no stance on whether Johnson was innocent or not, he identified several concerns, including that prosecutors “presented as many as five different theories relative to who shot Deputy Hardy.” Carr also noted the alibi witnesses who remembered seeing Johnson at the time Deputy Hardy was killed. Carr also emphasized that even the original lead prosecutor of Johnson's trial told Carr of his "grave doubts" about the case. Carr reiterated in his brief that the duty of the prosecution was "not merely to secure convictions, but to seek justice".

The District Attorney's Office summarized its findings as follows:

The conclusion that Johnson’s conviction is fundamentally unreliable is not based on any one fact. Instead, it is based on the totality of the facts. Johnson’s conviction hinges on Ellison’s account. And we know now that the physical evidence contradicts Ellison’s account and that Ellison’s notes contained information based on other sources and that credible alibi witnesses place Johnson elsewhere at the time of the crime and that Ellison was paid $5,000 for her testimony. We also know that Ellison was not believed by law enforcement initially and that a different theory of the case that contradicted her account was pursued after Johnson’s trial and that the lead prosecutor now has such grave concerns about Ellison’s account that he supports a new trial for Johnson.

The District Attorney's public support for Johnson's conviction to be overturned was followed by a public statement from former Alabama Attorney General Bill Baxley, who reviewed Johnson's case and determined that "an innocent man is trapped on Alabama's death row." Baxley, a staunch death penalty supporter, has since become one of the most vocal supporters of Johnson's fight for a new trial.

In March 2021, seven different groups of lawyers, former judges and prosecutors, faith leaders, and legal scholars submitted amicus briefs in support of a new trial for Johnson.

Alabama Attorney General Steve Marshall does not support a new trial for Johnson.

In July 2022, Greater Birmingham Ministries (GBM) hung a large banner in support of Johnson outside the World Games at Protective Stadium with the message that "It is not too late to fix this mistake," and a QR code leading to an advocacy website. The banner has since been taken on a tour of churches around the state, as reported in the Earwitness podcast about the Johnson case.

Celebrity Kim Kardashian also supported the efforts to prove Johnson's innocence and requested a re-trial, stating that an innocent man was on death row for a crime he did not commit. Following his commutation in October 2026, Kardashian posted an Instagram message saying, "I am so grateful that Toforest will no longer face execution, but his fight for justice is far from over."

More than 400 people gathered at a church event in April 2023 to show support for Johnson. Some former jurors from Johnson's trial have also publicly expressed their hopes that Johnson's conviction would be overturned and felt that they would not have found him guilty had they known what they know now.

In May 2024, the Jefferson County District Attorney's Office filed a more extensive report outlining its review of the integrity of Johnson's conviction. This report once again urged the court to grant Johnson a new trial, and included "detailed support for its conclusion that the conviction and death sentence of Toforest Johnson cannot stand." The District Attorney wrote that former prosecutor Wallace's support for a new trial was significant. According to the District Attorney, "Wallace served as the lead prosecutor in this case for four years and knew the case better than anyone else. He sought and obtained Johnson’s conviction and death sentence over the course of two trials and many years. He now firmly believes, in light of information about which he was unaware at the time he prosecuted this case, that Johnson should receive a new trial."

In August 2024, GBM erected a billboard in downtown Birmingham, asking "How did an innocent man end up on Alabama's death row?" The billboard contained a URL that directed viewers to the Earwitness podcast.

In March 2025, former U.S. Senator Doug Jones and former Attorney General Bill Baxley published an op-ed in which they argued that the position of the current District Attorney and the original trial prosecutor in Johnson's case should be given significant consideration. Jones and Baxley asserted that the State of Alabama's argument that the court should ignore the District Attorney's conclusion was "not only illogical, it is outright dangerous."

== Commutation ==
On October 20, 2026, Alabama Governor Kay Ivey commuted Johnson's sentence from death to life imprisonment without the possibility of parole. Ivey said of her decision, “When presented with Mr. Johnson’s case, I had concerns there was not enough direct evidence to carry out the most serious punishment, death.” Johnson's sentence represents the third death sentence Ivey has commuted during her tenure, after Robin Dion "Rocky" Myers and Charles Lee Burton.

Following Governor Ivey's commutation, one of Johnson's attorneys, Ty Alper, issued a statement saying that Johnson's legal team would continue to fight his conviction in court. “We will keep fighting until he is home with his family,” he said.

== In popular culture ==
In September 2022, the true crime podcast Generation Why featured Johnson's case.

In September 2023, Lava for Good released an eight-episode podcast series called Earwitness, about Johnson's case. The podcast is hosted by Birmingham-based journalist, Beth Shelburne, and focuses on answering the question of why Johnson is still on death row when even the prosecutor who tried and convicted him has asked the courts to overturn his conviction. The podcast has garnered critical acclaim, including being named to Entertainment Weekly's Top 30 best true crime podcasts of all time. In January 2026, Lava for Good announced that it was re-releasing Earwitness as Season Four of the award-winning podcast Bone Valley from Gilbert King. The re-release was accompanied by an interview with Shelburne, King, and the directors of The Alabama Solution, a documentary about the Alabama prison system that Shelburne co-produced.

In November 2023, the nonprofit investigative radio show "Reveal" devoted an episode to Johnson's case.

== See also ==
- Capital punishment in Alabama
- Anthony Ray Hinton, a former Alabama death row prisoner also sentenced to death in Jefferson County, Alabama and later exonerated
- Walter McMillian, a former Alabama death row prisoner who was wrongfully convicted and sentenced to death before being exonerated
