= Paul Hubbert =

American politician (1935–2014)

- Born: December 25, 1935; Jasper, Alabama, U.S.
- Died: October 14, 2014 (aged 78); Montgomery, Alabama
- Known for: President of the Alabama Education Association, candidate for Governor of Alabama
- Political party: Democratic

Paul R. Hubbert (December 25, 1935 – October 14, 2014) was an American politician and Democratic gubernatorial candidate from the U.S. state of Alabama. From 1969 to 2011, he was executive secretary-treasurer of the Alabama Education Association, a professional association for teachers. The organization serves many of the functions of a trade union, and is often referred to as such by news media and political opponents. State law prohibits public employees from being represented by a union per se, hence the designation.

As president of the AEA, he exerted significant influence upon Alabama politics. In 1990, he ran as the Democratic nominee in the Alabama gubernatorial election, and lost to Republican incumbent H. Guy Hunt. Four years later he was an unsuccessful candidate for the Democratic nomination for governor. He was co-chair of the Alabama Democratic Party, and a target of criticism from the state's Republican party and leadership.

He resigned that role in 2011, after Republicans took control of both chambers of the Alabama Legislature, which greatly diminished the influence of the AEA.

Born in Hubbertville, Alabama, Hubbert was an alumnus of the University of North Alabama, which at the time of his attendance, was named Florence State Teachers College.

He died in a Montgomery, Alabama hospital following complications of a fall October 6, 2014.

Party political offices
Preceded by Bill Baxley	Democratic nominee for Governor of Alabama; 1990	Succeeded by Jim Folsom Jr.
