= Fob James =

American politician (born 1934)

48th Governor of Alabama
- In office January 16, 1995 – January 18, 1999
- Lieutenant: Don Siegelman
- Preceded by: Jim Folsom Jr.
- Succeeded by: Don Siegelman
- In office January 15, 1979 – January 17, 1983
- Lieutenant: George McMillan
- Preceded by: George Wallace
- Succeeded by: George Wallace

Personal details
- Born: Forrest Hood James Jr. September 15, 1934 (age 92) Lanett, Alabama, U.S.
- Party: Democratic (before early 1970s, 1978–1994); Republican (early 1970s–1978, 1994–present)
- Spouse: Bobbie Mooney
- Children: 4, including Tim
- Education: Auburn University (BS)

Military service
- Allegiance: United States
- Branch/service: United States Army
- Years of service: 1956–1958
- Rank: Second Lieutenant
- Unit: Army Corps of Engineers

Forrest Hood "Fob" James Jr. (born September 15, 1934) is an American politician, civil engineer, entrepreneur, and former football player. He served as the 48th governor of Alabama as a Democrat from 1979 to 1983 and again as a Republican from 1995 to 1999. He governed as a staunch conservative during his second term and was the only state governor to refuse to attend National Governors Association meetings.

== Education, football, and early career ==
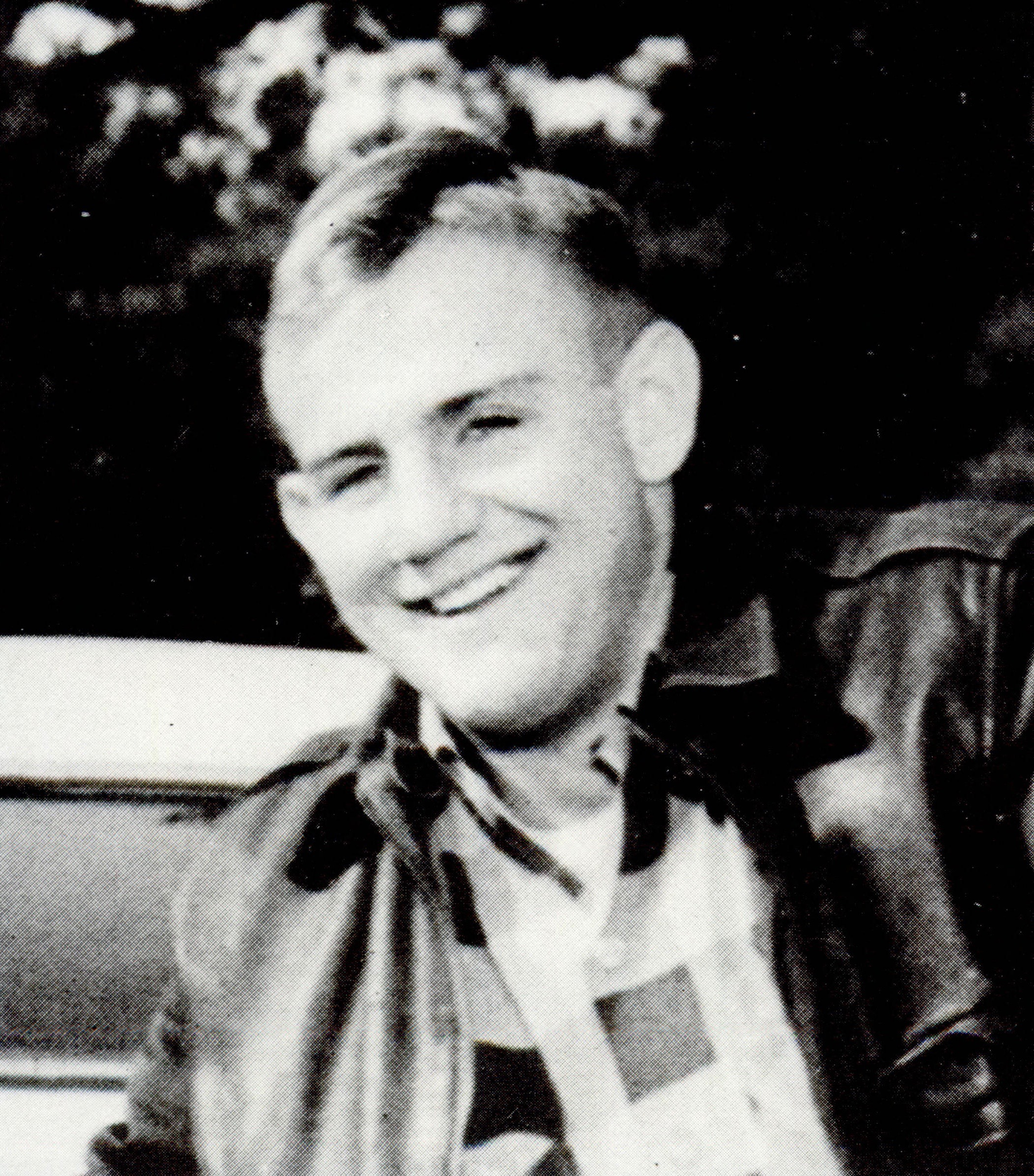
James as a college student, c. 1956

James was born in Lanett, Alabama, the son of Rebecca (née Ellington) James (1907 - 1999) and Forrest Hood James (1905 - 1973). Named after his father, James was nicknamed "Fob" as a boy. His maternal grandparents were Calvin Sidney Ellington (1871 - 1958) and Sue Reese Robertson (1872 - 1959). They married in 1904. Calvin, known by his nickname of "Cal" was a commercial traveler who sold dry goods. In addition, he was also a farmer. Calvin died on November 1, 1958 at the age of 87, and Sue died the next year on October 2, 1959, also at the age of 87. Calvin and Sue were buried at Rosemere Cemetery in Opelika, Lee County, Alabama.

After graduation in 1952 from Baylor School, a private high school in Chattanooga, Tennessee, James entered Auburn University, where he played football for head coach Ralph "Shug" Jordan. In 1955 James was named All-American as a halfback. He received a civil engineering degree in 1957. During the 1956 season, he played professional football in Canada as a member of the Montreal Alouettes. He entered the US Army and served two years as a lieutenant in the Corps of Engineers.

From 1958 to 1959, James worked as a heavy construction engineer with Burford-Toothaker Tractor Company in Montgomery, Alabama. He had married and started a family. In 1959, his second born, Gregory Fleming James, was diagnosed with cystic fibrosis. Needing more money to pay medical bills, James left Montgomery in 1960 to take a job as construction superintendent with Laidlaw Contracting Company, a road-paving company in Mobile.

In 1961, James decided that he could earn a living from the manufacture of plastic-coated barbells. In 1962, he founded Diversified Products Inc., a manufacturer of fitness equipment; it was known for the plastic-disc barbells filled with "Orbatron," which DP patented. The company name was changed to "Diversified Products Corporation" after originally being called Health-Disc Inc. In addition to physical fitness equipment, the company manufactured ballasts and counterweights for farms, industry and trucking. James founded DP in his basement and, over the next 15 years, the company ultimately grew to employ 1,500 people with plants in Opelika, AL, Los Angeles, and Toronto, with sales of about $1 billion annually. James served as the CEO of DP until 1977, when it was bought by the Liggett Group.

James's son Gregory died of cystic fibrosis at the age of eight. In 1981, James established the Gregory Fleming James Cystic Fibrosis Research Center at the University of Alabama at Birmingham, named in his honor. James played an integral role in the establishment of the center.

From 1972 to 1974, James served as president of the Alabama Citizens for Transportation, a statewide committee that developed a twenty-year highway program. This was subsequently adopted by the Alabama Legislature.

== Political career ==
=== First term ===
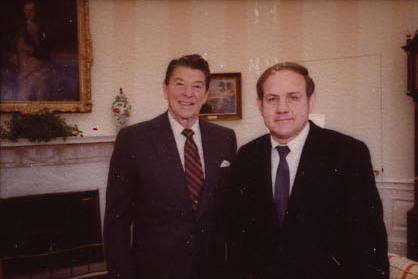
James with President Ronald Reagan in 1981

During his 1978 campaign for governor, James campaigned as a "born-again Democrat". James had left the Democratic Party in the early 1970s but returned to the party before the election. In the first primary, he defeated Alabama Attorney General Bill Baxley, 296,196 votes to 210,089 votes. In the run-off, James easily outdistanced Baxley. In the November general election, he defeated the Republican candidate, Guy Hunt.

During James' first administration, the state faced considerable financial difficulties. James was reasonably successful in attaining his education reform package, improving the state's mental health system, rectifying some prison overcrowding problems and fortifying the once financially strapped Medicaid system. James consolidated various state agencies to reduce state spending. Additionally, he implemented a ten percent State spending cut, instituted a hiring freeze, and laid off a considerable number of the state employee workforce. He also chose to emphasize funding for k-12 education, over that for Alabama's colleges and universities, a highly contested action. He also worked to acquire stiffer penalties for convicted drug traffickers. He was instrumental in improving state highways as a result of earmarking a substantial amount of money for such improvements from the state's oil windfall funds. James was unsuccessful in his attempts to have a new state constitution drafted, levy a fuel tax, rectify the court-ordered desegregation of some of the state's post-secondary institutions, and secure passage of his bill to eliminate income tax deductions for Social Security payments.

One of his greatest accomplishments was integrating Alabama government. During his inauguration, he "claim(ed) for all Alabamians a New Beginning (his campaign theme) free from racism and discrimination." During his first term as governor, he nominated Oscar W. Adams Jr. to fill a vacancy on the Alabama Supreme Court, the first African American chosen for such a position. In addition, he appointed many Black people to cabinet positions, including Gary Cooper as director of the Department of Pensions and Security, the first African American in a century to be appointed to lead a major state agency in Alabama.

During his first term, James drew opposition by signing into law a measure passed by the legislature that allowed teachers to lead willing students in prayer. The law was declared unconstitutional by the U.S. Supreme Court in 1985.

=== Between terms ===
James's decision not to run again for governor in 1982 eased the way for former governor George Wallace to return to office for a fourth and final term. Out of office, however, James began to yearn for a return to the governorship. He ran but was defeated in both the 1986 and 1990 Democratic primaries.

Living a semi-retired life while out of office, he partnered with his sons in several businesses. He managed and partly owned Orange Beach Marina, served as the CEO of Coastal Erosion Control, a company that worked to prevent coastal erosion; and worked as the CEO of Escambia County Environmental Corporation, which develops landfills and waste incinerators. In the spring of 1994, James's desire to be governor again led him to switch parties again. He qualified at the last moment as a Republican candidate.

First he defeated Winton Blount, III, of Montgomery and State Senator Ann Bedsole, a moderate Republican from Mobile in the primary and runoff election for the Republican nomination. Bedsole refused to endorse James in the general election, but he still defeated incumbent Democratic Governor Jim Folsom, Jr., by a narrow margin, and won his second term as governor, this time as a Republican.

=== Second term ===
James governed as a staunch conservative during his second term, reflecting individualistic, states' rights convictions. James "seceded" from the National Governors Association, and was the only state governor to refuse to attend the organization's meetings. In 1981, he designed the Alabama Budget Isolation Process as a hopeful remedy to years of legislative standstills. It is still in effect in the Legislature today.

As governor, James appointed Aubrey Miller, an African American, to head the Alabama Tourism Department. He also appointed Beth Chapman to his cabinet; she was the first woman in Alabama's history to serve as Appointments Secretary.

==== Crime and justice ====
James took a "tough" position on crime and criminals. He and his prison commissioner, Ronald Jones, reinstituted chain gangs, a form of forced labor for Alabama's prison inmates. This practice affected the disproportionately large African-American inmate population in Alabama, in which a discriminatory criminal justice system played a part. Inmates were displayed while in chains for mostly white tourists to see. Alabama became the first state to bring back the practice symbolic of and prevalent in the Jim Crow era, the post-slavery period where racism against African Americans was codified into law. The practice continued even as an African American inmate was killed by an officer after a fight with another inmate ensued at a chain gang worksite.

The Governor approved other policies instituted by Jones, but he balked at the commissioner's suggestion that chain gangs be extended to include female prisoners. James put an end to the chain gang in June 1996, because of a lawsuit brought by a coalition of community human rights groups. Regarding crime issues, James cited as one of his "major accomplishments" the revision of the Alabama Criminal Code, which made it one of the toughest in the U.S.

During his second term, James, who firmly supported the death penalty, presided over seven executions by electric chair (Alabama resumed executions in 1983). However, in one of his last official acts as governor, James commuted the death sentence of Judith Ann Neelley to life in prison. This remains, as of 2008, the only post-Furman commutation of a death sentence by a governor in Alabama. James explained that, in his view, executing Neelley would not have been just. His reason was that the Neeley case was the only time he had seen a judge overrule the jury's unanimous decision to impose life imprisonment by issuing a death penalty. But Alabama has more than one judge who has made his reputation on imposing the death penalty against jury votes.

James helped arrange a State of Alabama-paid voluntary return to the US of Lester Coleman, a former journalist accused by the federal government of committing perjury, who had been residing in Europe. According to Redding Pitt, a federal government attorney from Montgomery, Alabama, Coleman called James, an acquaintance from the 1970s, for help in his case. Coleman promoted alternative theories regarding the Lockerbie bombing. His perjury charges stemmed from his statements about that incident. Joe Boohaker, Coleman's attorney, said that James apparently knew Coleman from when the latter man had worked at a Birmingham, Alabama radio station.

In an interview, Fob said of the removal of the Confederate flag from state offices, "I think it's a sick form of political correctness for everybody to act like they're offended because history is portrayed like history was."

==== Education ====
The Alabama legislature joined James in passing an educational reform package known as the James Educational Foundation Act. This legislation required local school systems that were not already at a minimum level of support to raise local property taxes to 10 mills,. It also increased the number of credit hours in academic subjects that students were required to have in order to graduate. This legislation empowered the state superintendent of education to take control of schools that scored poorly on national achievement tests. Prioritizing K-12 education, James shifted funding from the state's colleges and universities; such action strained relations between higher education and the governor's office.

James refused to accept federal monies from the U.S. Department of Education's Goals 2000 program because he believed that it would lead to increased federal involvement and control over the state's schools. When Secretary of Education Richard Riley promised that the Department of Education would not interfere in the use of the funds, Alabama's state board of education ignored the governor's protests and voted to accept the funding. They used it to purchase computers for K–12 classrooms.

==== Religion controversies ====
James was frequently criticized for expressing too much of his religious beliefs in his governing. At a 1995 Alabama State Board of Education meeting, James criticized the teaching of evolution in textbooks by imitating a "slump-shouldered ape turning into an upright human". He supported the adoption of a textbook warning sticker that said, among other things, that "No one was present when life first appeared on earth. Therefore, any statement about life's origins should be considered as theory, not fact."

James's most publicized religious battle was the lengthy controversy surrounding Etowah County Judge Roy S. Moore's posting of the Ten Commandments in his courtroom and the offering of a daily Christian prayer before proceedings. The American Civil Liberties Union (ACLU) sued to have the practice stopped as unconstitutional. U.S. District Court Judge Ira DeMent, an appointee of President George H. W. Bush, ruled in its favor, ordering the removal of the commandment plaque and cessation of the prayers because they violated the First Amendment guarantee of separation of church and state. Judge Moore appealed the decision, and James supported his position. For a brief period he threatened to mobilize the Alabama National Guard and use force if necessary to prevent the removal of the Ten Commandments plaque from Moore's courtroom.

In October 1997, Judge DeMent issued another sweeping order forbidding certain religious practices in DeKalb County's public schools, which also aroused controversy. James verbally attacked DeMent's order as yet another illegitimate intrusion by federal courts into local affairs. The judge's order was, in part, reversed shortly after James left office, allowing students at their own choice to hold religious meetings on school grounds.

==== Campaign for a third term ====
In his campaign for re-election to a third term, James faced strong opposition in the Republican party primary from Winton Blount III, a fellow conservative and a millionaire businessman whom James was documented referring to as a "fat monkey." He sharply criticized James's close ties to the Christian right. James struggled through the bitter Republican primary runoff and defeated Blount, but had little money left to finance the general election campaign. Incumbent Lieutenant Governor Don Siegelman easily won the Democratic primary on the sole issue of establishing a state lottery to provide for college scholarships. James opposed the lottery and was soundly defeated by Siegelman in the 1998 general election, to date the last time a Republican has been defeated in an Alabama gubernatorial election. He returned to semi-retirement, saying he wanted to spend more time with his children and grandchildren.

== Personal life and family ==
James and his wife, Bobbie, live in Miami, Florida. As of 2021, Fob James resides in an independent-living apartment in close proximity to the nursing facility where Bobbie James lives. The couple had four children: Greg, who died in the 1960s of cystic fibrosis; Tim, a businessman and three-time candidate for governor of Alabama; Fob III, a trial lawyer; and Patrick, whom Fob and Bobbie James sued in 2015 over allegations of fraud.

== Notes ==
Party political offices
Preceded by George Wallace	Democratic nominee for Governor of Alabama; 1978	Succeeded by George Wallace
Preceded by H. Guy Hunt	Republican nominee for Governor of Alabama; 1994, 1998	Succeeded by Bob Riley
Political offices
Preceded by George Wallace	Governor of Alabama; 1979–1983	Succeeded by George Wallace
Preceded by Jim Folsom Jr.	Governor of Alabama; 1995–1998	Succeeded by Don Siegelman
U.S. order of precedence (ceremonial)
Preceded by Martha McSally as Former U.S. Senator	Order of precedence of the United States; Within Alabama	Succeeded by Jim Folsom Jr. as Former Governor
Preceded by Bruce Rauner as Former Governor	Order of precedence of the United States; Outside Alabama	Succeeded by Jim Folsom Jr. as Former Governor
