= Danny Carr =

American lawyer (born 1970)

District Attorney of Jefferson County, Alabama
- Incumbent
- Assumed office November 27, 2018
- Preceded by: Michael Anderton

District Attorney of Jefferson County, Alabama
- In office January 14, 2017 – December 1, 2017
- Preceded by: Charles Todd Henderson
- Succeeded by: Mike Anderton

Personal details
- Born: 1970 (age 55–56) Birmingham, Alabama
- Party: Democratic
- Education: Alabama State University; Miles College

Danny Darnell Carr (born 1970) is the District Attorney of Jefferson County, Alabama, serving since November 27, 2018. Carr previously served as the county's interim district attorney in 2017. He is the first African-American District Attorney in the Birmingham division of the Jefferson County, Alabama District Attorney's office.

== Life and career ==
Carr was born in the Ensley neighborhood of Birmingham, Alabama. He was raised by a single mother, Regina Carr-Hope, who worked as a probation officer and later the Principal of Wenonah High School. Carr graduated from Jackson-Olin High School, then attended Alabama State University on a basketball scholarship. He graduated from Miles Law School.

In 2016, attorney Charles Todd Henderson was elected as a Democrat to be the next Jefferson County District Attorney. Henderson was then indicted on felony perjury, leading to Carr's appointment as interim District Attorney. Alabama Governor Kay Ivey later appointed Michael Anderton, a Republican prosecutor in the district attorney's office, as the next Jefferson County District Attorney. Local activists previously petitioned the Governor to not remove Carr, a Democrat, from the seat.

A career Jefferson County prosecutor and criminal justice reformer, Carr was the victorious Democratic nominee for Jefferson County District Attorney in the November 6, 2018 general election, defeating Anderton. Carr took office on November 27, 2018.

In May 2024, Carr filed a public report calling for a new trial for death row prisoner Toforest Johnson, a man his office successfully prosecuted in 1998. Carr's report detailed the reasons why his office had concluded that "the evidence in this case has unraveled over 20 years.” Carr wrote that "it has not been possible, until recently, to fully appreciate the full extent to which the foundation of this conviction has disintegrated." Carr was joined in his call for a new trial by Jeff Wallace, the prosecutor who obtained Johnson's conviction and death sentence in 1998. Kim Kardashian and many others have also spoken out in support of Johnson's quest for a new trial.
