= Bill Baxley =

American politician (born 1941)

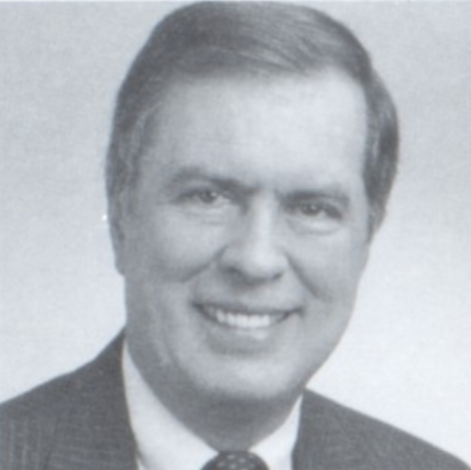

24th Lieutenant Governor of Alabama
- In office January 17, 1983 – January 19, 1987
- Governor: George Wallace
- Preceded by: George McMillan
- Succeeded by: Jim Folsom, Jr.

41st Attorney General of Alabama
- In office January 18, 1971 – January 15, 1979
- Governor: George Wallace
- Preceded by: MacDonald Gallion
- Succeeded by: Charles Graddick

District Attorney Houston County
- In office 1969–1971

Personal details
- Born: William Joseph Baxley II; June 27, 1941 (age 84) Dothan, Alabama, U.S.
- Party: Democratic
- Spouses: Lucy Bruner (m. 1974; div. 1987) Marie Prat (m. 1990)
- Children: 5

Military service
- Allegiance: United States
- Branch/service: United States Army; Alabama Army National Guard
- Years of service: 1962–2001
- Rank: Colonel

William Joseph Baxley II (born June 27, 1941), is an American Democratic politician and attorney from Dothan, Alabama.

In 1964, Baxley graduated from the University of Alabama School of Law in Tuscaloosa. During his time at the University of Alabama, Baxley was a member of The Machine, which is known for voter intimidation in the University of Alabama system.

Having previously served as district attorney in Houston County, he was elected to the first of two consecutive terms as Attorney General of Alabama in 1970, and 1974 respectively, holding the post from 1971 to 1979. At the age of twenty-eight, he won the Democratic nomination for attorney general in 1970, in an upset over incumbent McDonald Gallion. Baxley, incorrectly, was perceived as the candidate closer politically to George Wallace, an impression he did not dispute throughout the election contest. At the time of his swearing-in, he was the youngest person in U.S. history to hold a state attorney generalship. At the end of his attorney generalship, he lost the 1978 Democratic primary for governor in an upset contest. Although widely expected to seek the post again in 1982, after former governor George C. Wallace entered the contest, Baxley said he would not run against him and sought the office of lieutenant governor, to which he was elected. From 1983 to 1987, he served a single term as the 24th lieutenant governor of Alabama. He ran unsuccessfully in the primary for governor in 1986. During his time as state attorney general, Baxley aggressively prosecuted industrial polluters, strip miners, and corrupt elected officials. He appointed the state's first African-American assistant attorney general, Myron Thompson, who later became a U.S. District Judge.

Baxley reopened the cold case of the 1963 16th Street Baptist Church bombing. In a letter, the Ku Klux Klan threatened him, comparing him to John F. Kennedy, and called him an "honorary nigger." Baxley responded, on official state letterhead: "My response to your letter of February 19, 1976, is—kiss my ass."

== Prosecution of 16th Street Baptist Church bombing ==
As Alabama Attorney General, Baxley became known in 1977 for his successful prosecution of Robert Chambliss, a member of a splinter group of the Ku Klux Klan (KKK), in the cold case of the 16th Street Baptist Church bombing in Birmingham on Sunday, September 15, 1963. The dynamite blast, which occurred during the time of nonviolent demonstrations in the Birmingham campaign for integration and voting rights – led by Martin Luther King Jr., James Bevel, Fred Shuttlesworth and others – killed four young girls and injured 14 to 22 others.

In 1968, the FBI formally closed their investigation into the bombing without filing charges against any of their named suspects. The files were sealed by order of J. Edgar Hoover. When Baxley reopened the dormant investigation shortly after being elected in 1971, he told one interviewer that "There are some people in Jefferson County who ought to be pretty nervous right now", and later told a Birmingham radio station that the list of suspects had been narrowed down, stating "We know who did it."

Baxley confirmed that he had talked to Gary Thomas Rowe, an FBI paid informant and agent provocateur within the KKK. Baxley said that Rowe had been cooperative, but that "we were working on this thing long before that. We had a lot of stuff already. Rowe was just another person we interviewed."

Baxley succeeded in gaining a guilty verdict by the jury in Chambliss's trial. The families of the four girls who were killed felt that some justice had been achieved. In the early 21st century, when two more suspected conspirators were tried, Baxley was dismayed to learn that the FBI had secretly obtained audio tapes in which defendants had implicated themselves, which had never been offered to him for his own prosecution.

== Runs for governor ==
In 1978, Baxley, then the sitting attorney general, ran to succeed the term-limited George Wallace as governor of Alabama. Baxley lost the Democratic primary to political newcomer Fob James, who defeated Republican nominee Guy Hunt of Cullman. Baxley's campaign had highlighted the fact that James had been a Republican and returned to the Democratic Party to pursue his candidacy. Baxley was endorsed by University of Alabama football coach Bear Bryant, largely because James was a former football letterman for the Crimson Tide's bitter archrival, the Auburn Tigers and their Hall of Fame coach, Shug Jordan.

In 1986, the Democratic primary for the gubernatorial race resulted in then Attorney General Charles Graddick of Mobile in a runoff with Baxley, then the lieutenant governor. Graddick won the run-off election by a few thousand votes, but Baxley appealed to the Alabama Supreme Court. It ruled that Graddick had violated primary regulations by encouraging Republicans to "cross over" and vote as Democrats. The court told the Democratic Party to hold another election, or to affirm Baxley as the nominee. The party confirmed Baxley as its candidate.

Although there had nominally been a ban on crossover voting for years, it had never previously been enforced since Alabama was still a one-party state. Alabama voters were thus used to a de facto open primary system, and protested by throwing their support to Guy Hunt, the GOP nominee. Initially, Hunt was given almost no chance of winning even by his fellow Republicans, who focused on getting a second term for U. S. Senator Jeremiah Denton. However, buoyed by support from Democrats breaking ranks (mostly among Graddick's primary voters), Hunt defeated Baxley by a large margin, giving Alabama its first Republican governor since Reconstruction. The demographics of the party loyalists had switched over the decades. Conservative whites had begun gradually moving to the Republican Party after years of splitting their tickets, while African Americans supported Democratic Party candidates following passage of civil rights legislation in the 1960s that enforced their constitutional rights.

== Toforest Johnson Case ==
Baxley has been very outspoken about his belief in the innocence of Alabama death row prisoner Toforest Johnson. In March 2021, he published an op-ed in the Washington Post, in which he declared: "As a lifelong defender of the death penalty, I do not lightly say what follows: An innocent man is trapped on Alabama’s death row." Baxley wrote that in his "56-year career as an Alabama lawyer, only twice have I discovered that an innocent man was sentenced to die," the last survivor of the Scottsboro Boys, and Toforest Johnson. In 2021, Baxley joined an amicus brief in support of a new trial for Johnson, citing District Attorney Danny Carr's determination that the District Attorney's Office no longer had faith in the conviction and death sentence it obtained in 1998. The brief stated, “When a prosecutor takes the extraordinary step of re-examining a previous conviction… if the prosecutor concludes that the conviction cannot stand, that conclusion should be given substantial deference." Baxley has continued to speak out about the Johnson case, both in the media, and at events in the city of Birmingham organized to raise awareness about Johnson's case.

== Personal life ==
In 1962, Baxley joined in the Alabama Army National Guard, where he began his career as an enlisted clerk. He retired as a colonel on May 29, 2001 (he had turned down the position of General), JAG Corps.

In 1974, Baxley married Lucy Mae Bruner. She also was politically active, and was elected as Alabama lieutenant governor in 2002, serving from 2003 to 2007. They had divorced in 1987. Baxley was a strong supporter of his ex-wife's campaign.

In 1990, Baxley married Marie (Prat) Baxley, a reporter who had covered his campaign.

In 1979, Baxley founded the firm Baxley, Dillard Trial Counsel (by 2006 was Baxley, Dillard, Dauphin, McKnight & Barclift), in Birmingham. He primarily represented large business corporations, yet also continued to represent individuals of modest means. Those efforts earned him the distinction of being selected as a fellow in the International Academy of Trial Lawyers.

Party political offices
Preceded by MacDonald Gallion	Democratic nominee for Attorney General of Alabama; 1970, 1974	Succeeded by Charles Graddick
Preceded by George McMillan	Democratic nominee for Lieutenant Governor of Alabama; 1982	Succeeded by Jim Folsom Jr.
Preceded by George Wallace	Democratic nominee for Governor of Alabama; 1986	Succeeded by Paul Hubbert
Legal offices
Preceded by MacDonald Gallion	Attorney General of Alabama; 1971–1979	Succeeded by Charles A. Graddick
Political offices
Preceded by George McMillan	Lieutenant Governor of Alabama; 1983–1987	Succeeded by Jim Folsom, Jr.
