= Jimmy Evans (politician) =

American politician (1939–2021)

43rd Attorney General of Alabama
- In office January 21, 1991 – January 16, 1995
- Governor: H. Guy Hunt; Jim Folsom Jr.
- Preceded by: Don Siegelman
- Succeeded by: Jeff Sessions

Personal details
- Born: James Harold Evans; March 28, 1939 Montgomery, Alabama, U.S.
- Died: February 15, 2021 (aged 81)
- Party: Democratic
- Education: University of Alabama; New York University
- Occupation: Lawyer; politician

James Harold Evans (March 28, 1939 – February 15, 2021) was an American lawyer and politician who served as the attorney general of Alabama from 1991 to 1995. He lost his reelection bid for a second term in 1994 to Jeff Sessions.

Evans was born in Montgomery, Alabama. He went to Huntingdon College and Auburn University. A graduate of the University of Alabama, Evans was also a lawyer in Montgomery, Alabama and a judge for Montgomery County, Alabama. He died of pneumonia and heart attack.

Party political offices
Preceded by Don Siegelman	Democratic nominee for Attorney General of Alabama; 1990, 1994	Succeeded by Terry Butts
