= 1990 Alabama gubernatorial election =

- November 6, 1990
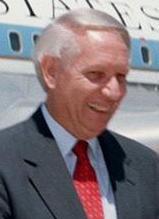

Nominee	H. Guy Hunt	Paul Hubbert
Party	Republican	Democratic
Popular vote	633,519	582,106
Percentage	52.11%	47.89%
- County results Hunt: 50–60% 60–70% 70–80% Hubbert: 50–60% 60–70% 70–80% 80–90%
Governor before election
H. Guy Hunt
Republican
Elected Governor
H. Guy Hunt
Republican

The 1990 Alabama gubernatorial election was held on November 6, 1990, to select the governor of Alabama. The election saw incumbent Republican governor Guy Hunt defeat Democrat Paul Hubbert, executive secretary of the Alabama Education Association. This marked the first time in history that a Republican won a second gubernatorial term in Alabama.

== Democratic primary ==
The Democratic primary saw teachers' union head Paul Hubbert defeat Attorney General of Alabama Don Siegelman for the Democratic nomination. No candidate gained a majority in the 5 June primary requiring a runoff between the top two candidates.

=== Primary election ===
==== Candidates ====
- Charles Bishop, state senator
- Ed Daw
- Ronnie Flippo, U.S. representative
- Paul Hubbert, executive secretary of the Alabama Education Association
- Fob James, former governor
- Don Siegelman, attorney general

==== Results ====
Democratic primary results
Party	Candidate	Votes	%
Democratic	Paul Hubbert	233,808	31.5
Democratic	Don Siegelman	184,635	24.9
Democratic	Fob James	160,121	21.6
Democratic	Ronnie Flippo	128,105	17.3
Democratic	Charles Bishop	31,684	4.3
Democratic	Ed Daw	3,357	0.5
Total votes		741,710	100

Source: 1990 Gubernatorial Democratic Primary Election Results – Alabama

=== Runoff election ===
Democratic runoff results
Party	Candidate	Votes	%
Democratic	Paul Hubbert	309,609	53.6
Democratic	Don Siegelman	267,588	46.4
Total votes		577,197	100

Source: 1990 Gubernatorial Democratic Runoff Election Results – Alabama

== Election result ==
1990 Alabama gubernatorial election
Party	Candidate	Votes	%	±%
Republican	H. Guy Hunt (incumbent)	633,519	52.11%	−4.34%
Democratic	Paul Hubbert	582,106	47.89%	+4.34%
Majority		51,413	4.2	
Turnout		1,215,625	39.7	
Republican hold		Swing		
