= Charles Graddick =

Alabama lawyer and politician (born 1944)

Charles Allen Graddick Sr.
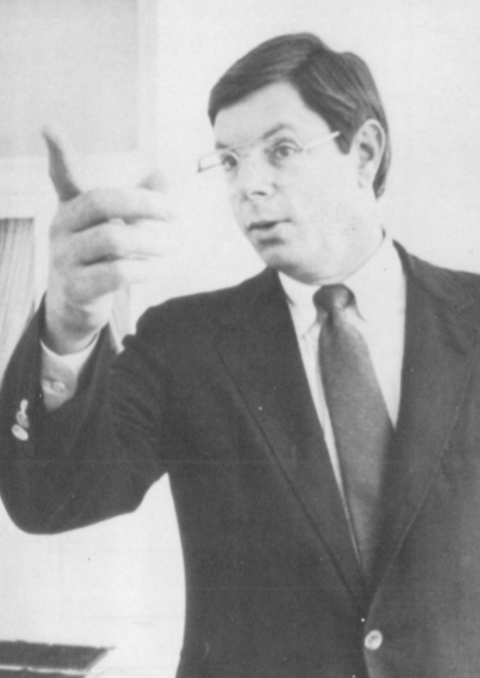

Director of the Alabama Bureau of Pardons and Paroles
- In office September 2, 2019 – November 30, 2020
- Succeeded by: Cam Ward

42nd Attorney General of Alabama
- In office January 15, 1979 – January 19, 1987
- Governor: Fob James
- Preceded by: Bill Baxley
- Succeeded by: Don Siegelman

District Attorney of Mobile County, Alabama
- In office 1975–1979

Judge of the Alabama 13th Judicial Circuit Court
- Incumbent
- Assumed office May 2004
- Preceded by: William McDermott

Personal details
- Born: December 10, 1944 (age 81) Mobile, Alabama, U.S.
- Party: Republican (2011–present); Democratic (before 2011)
- Spouse: Corinne Whiting Graddick
- Children: Charles Allen Graddick, Jr. Herndon Whiting Graddick Corinne Graddick
- Education: UMS-Wright Preparatory School; University of Alabama; Cumberland School of Law
- Profession: Lawyer

Military service
- Allegiance: United States
- Branch/service: United States Army; Alabama National Guard
- Years of service: 1969–1972

Charles Allen Graddick Sr. (born December 10, 1944, in Mobile), is an American politician who served as the 42nd attorney general of Alabama from 1979 to 1987. He later served as a judge of the 13th Judicial Circuit Court of the U.S. state of Alabama.

== Background ==
Graddick graduated in 1963 from the all-male University Military School in Mobile. The institution was the forerunner of UMS-Wright Preparatory School. In 1967, he received his undergraduate degree from the University of Alabama at Tuscaloosa, where he was a member of Delta Kappa Epsilon fraternity. In 1970, Graddick obtained his Juris Doctor from the Cumberland School of Law in Birmingham, having been chosen the class president. In 1975, at the age of thirty, he was elected District Attorney of Mobile County.

Graddick, who served as Alabama’s Attorney General from 1979 to 1987, has always been a proponent of the tough on crime mindset and lengthy sentences. Under his watch, Alabama's prison system became known as one of the harshest in the United States. He wrote Alabama’s infamous habitual offender law, which punishes people with a life sentence for drug and property crimes. He justified it by referring to all offenders as “career criminals”. However, those “career criminals” were mostly poor and Afro-american young males, who were sentenced in their late teens or early twenties to a mandatory life without parole for crimes like robbery, theft and burglary In 2019, the DOJ released a scathing report, citing overcrowding, widespread violence and corruption in Alabama’s prisons, and gave leaders a deadline to implement changes.

Graddick made a career using inflammatory rhetoric about people in the criminal justice system. He infamously promised to “fry them until their eyeballs pop out and smoke comes out of their ears.” Graddick eventually gained the nickname "Charcoal Charlie" due to his stance on the death penalty. He maintains a zealous support for executions, despite known wrongful convictions and a racial disparity on Alabama’s death row.

As Attorney General, he blocked efforts to reduce the prison population and fought against rehabilitative programs. When he ran unsuccessfully for Governor, he promised to make sure Alabama prisons remained brutal for people serving time. "The next Governor needs to make sure our prisons look more like prisons and less like welcome centers", he told a crowd of supporters.

After almost 20 years in the private practice of law, he was appointed as circuit judge in 2004 and was elected twice thereafter without opposition. He Served as Presiding Judge for 10 years. After retirement from the State Court Bench, Judge Graddick was appointed Senior Judicial Advisor to the Mayor of Mobile and Director of Courts.

In 1966, Graddick married the former Corinne Whiting. The couple has three children and six grandchildren.

== 1986 gubernatorial race ==
The 1986 Alabama Democratic primary for governor featured Attorney General Graddick in a heated runoff with then Lieutenant Governor Bill Baxley. Graddick won by almost ten thousand votes, but the state Democratic party ruled that he had violated a party rule by encouraging Republicans to vote in the Democratic primary. The court later instructed the Democratic Party either to hold another election or determine whether the crossover votes affected the outcome of the election. After a Party meeting the Party nominated Baxley.

Like Texas, Georgia, and Arkansas, Alabama does not register voters by party. At that time, the Democratic party had never enforced such a rule in any election because Alabama was a one-party state. Many Alabama voters opposed the democratic party hierarchy action and therefore voted in protest against Baxley and for H. Guy Hunt, the Republican nominee. Though he was previously considered a token candidate, Hunt won easily and became the first Alabama Republican governor since Reconstruction.

Hunt's election surprised many, since no living person had witnessed a Republican winning the election for governor of Alabama. The media had paid little attention to the Republican gubernatorial primaries, fully expecting that the GOP nominee would be the next loser in the general election.

After the campaign for governor in 1986, Graddick established a statewide law practice. At the request of Governor Hunt in 1991 filled an unexpired one year term as district attorney for Montgomery County. He returned to private practice in 1992. Subsequently, Republican Governor Bob Riley appointed Graddick to fill the post left vacant when Judge William McDermott of the 13th Judicial Circuit Court died in office in May 2004. Graddick was elected in January 2005 to serve a six-year term in the same post. He was selected by his fellow circuit judges to serve as the presiding judge of the 13th Judicial Circuit until his retirement in 2017.

== Switching parties ==
In 2011, Graddick declared his candidacy for Chief Justice of the Alabama Supreme Court, in the Republican primary held on March 13, 2012. Graddick opposed current chief justice, Charles "Chuck" Malone, and former Chief Justice Roy Moore. Both Graddick and Malone had lobbied Governor Robert J. Bentley for his appointment to replace then Chief Justice Sue Bell Cobb, who stepped down before her term expired.

Roy Moore held the chief justiceship from 2001 to 2003, when he was removed from office over the Ten Commandments dispute which received national attention. In a bid to return to his former position, in spite of all the pre-election day polls showing Graddick leading, Moore won nearly 51 percent of the ballots in the 2012 primary, having defeated both Malone and Graddick. Moore faced the Democrat Harry Lyon in the general election scheduled for November 6, 2012, only to be kicked off the ballot by the Democratic Party to be replaced by their hand-picked nominee, Robert Vance. Moore won the seat in the general election.

In September 2019, Graddick was appointed by Governor Kay Ivey to lead the Alabama Bureau of Pardons and Paroles as the Director of the agency. This was the first gubernatorial appointment to the directorship. Prior to Graddick's appointment, directors were appointed by the three members of the Board of Pardons and Paroles.

Party political offices
Preceded by Bill Baxley	Democratic nominee for Attorney General of Alabama; 1978, 1982	Succeeded by Don Siegelman
Preceded by Bob McKee	Republican nominee for Lieutenant Governor of Alabama; 1994	Succeeded by Steve Windom
Legal offices
Preceded by Bill Baxley	Attorney General of Alabama; 1979–1987	Succeeded by Don Siegelman
