= H. Guy Hunt =

American politician (1933–2009)

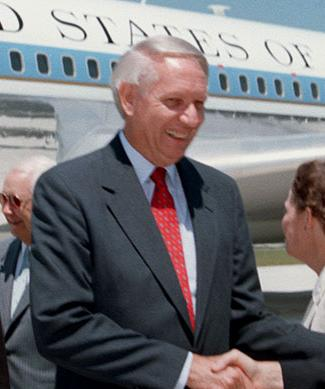

49th Governor of Alabama
- In office January 19, 1987 – April 22, 1993
- Lieutenant: Jim Folsom Jr.
- Preceded by: George Wallace
- Succeeded by: Jim Folsom Jr.

Personal details
- Born: Harold Guy Hunt; June 17, 1933 Holly Pond, Alabama, U.S.
- Died: January 30, 2009 (aged 75) Birmingham, Alabama, U.S.
- Resting place: Mount Vernon Primitive Baptist Church Cemetery, Cullman, Alabama
- Party: Republican
- Spouse(s): Helen Chambers (m. 1951; died 2004) Anne Smith (m. 2005)
- Children: 4
- Profession: Pastor, farmer, politician

Military service
- Allegiance: United States
- Branch/service: United States Army
- Years of service: 1951–1955
- Battles/wars: Korean War

Harold Guy Hunt (June 17, 1933 – January 30, 2009) was an American politician who served as the 49th governor of Alabama from 1987 to 1993. He was the first Republican to serve as governor of the state since Reconstruction.

== Early life ==
Hunt was born on June 17, 1933, in Holly Pond, Alabama to William Otto and Frances Holcombe Hunt. At an early age, Hunt joined the Mt. Vernon Primitive Baptist Church, which became a critical influence for the future governor. Less than a year out of high school at only 17 years of age, Hunt married Helen Chambers on February 25, 1951, and the couple had four children who continued his family's farming tradition.

During the Korean War, Hunt served in two divisions of the U.S. Army, earning the certificate of achievement for outstanding performance of military duty and the distinguished service medal. After his military service, Hunt returned to his family farm at Holly Pond and eventually was formally ordained as a minister in the Primitive Baptist Church.

== Political career ==
Hunt was active in the Republican Party from the days when the Democrats held near-total control of the state. He first ran for office in 1962, an unsuccessful run for the Alabama Senate.

In 1964, he was elected probate judge of Cullman County. Lyndon Johnson's signing of the Civil Rights Act caused many Democrats to split the ticket and vote for Republican presidential candidate Barry Goldwater that year, and Hunt was one of several Republicans swept into office on Goldwater's coattails making him the youngest probate judge in Alabama. He was reelected in 1970, stepping down in 1976 to honor a promise to serve only two terms.

He was State Chairman of Ronald Reagan's presidential campaigns in 1976 and 1980 and chaired the state's Republican delegation at the 1976 and 1980 Republican National Conventions.

In the 1978 Alabama gubernatorial election, Hunt was the Republican nominee for governor, but he lost in a massive landslide to then-Democrat Fob James.

== Election as governor ==
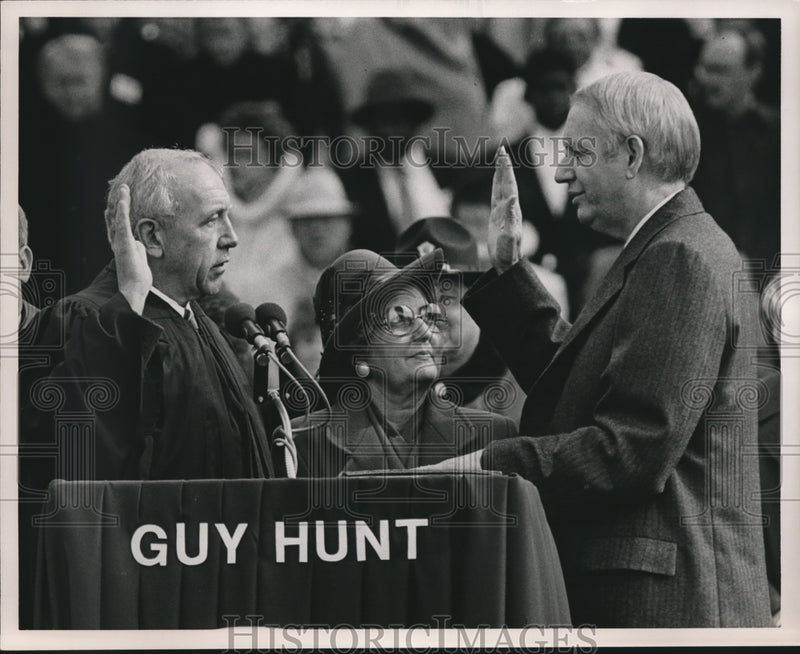
Hunt being sworn in as governor during his first inauguration, 1987

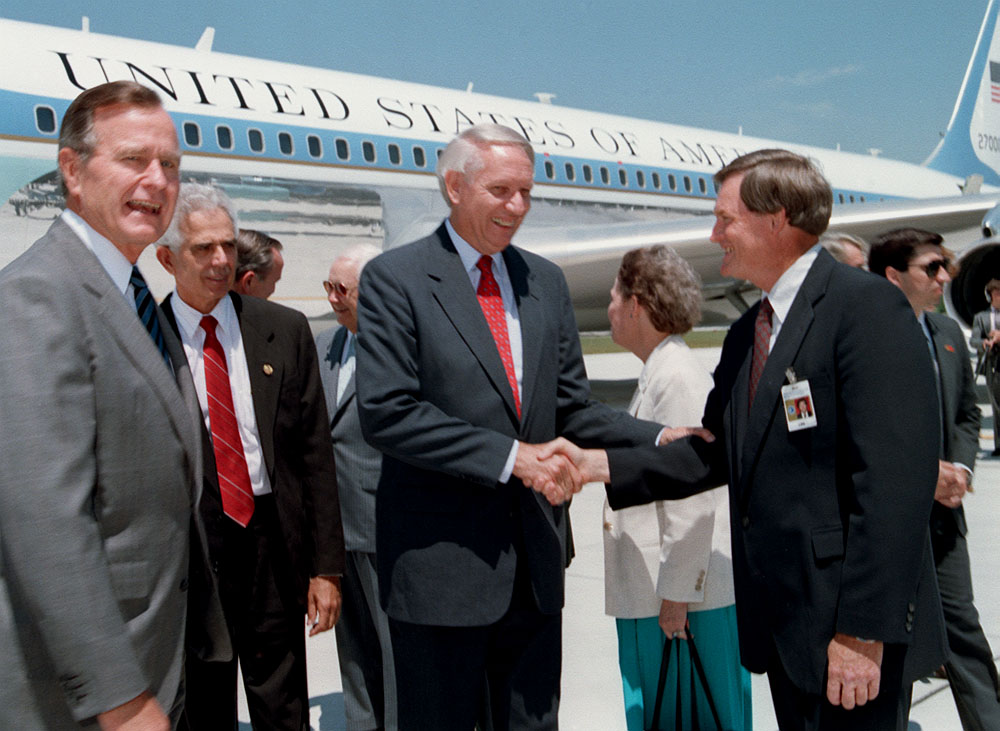
Hunt with George H. W. Bush and Thomas J. Lee at Redstone Army Airfield in 1990

After Reagan won the US election in 1980, he appointed Hunt as the Alabama State Director of the Agricultural Stabilization and Conservation Committee. He resigned in 1985 to run for governor. His campaign was not taken seriously at first even among Republicans, who were more concerned about helping Senator Jeremiah Denton win reelection. The press paid little attention to the Republican gubernatorial primary, fully expecting that the winner of the Democratic primary would be the next governor.

Concurrently, the Democratic primary saw then Alabama Attorney General Charles Graddick in a runoff with Lieutenant Governor Bill Baxley. Graddick, the more conservative candidate, won by a few thousand votes. However, Baxley sued, claiming that Graddick violated primary regulations by encouraging Republicans to "cross over" and vote as Democrats. Graddick, for his part, maintained that this was legal because Alabama was an open primary state. The state Supreme Court told the Democrats to either declare Baxley the winner by default or hold another primary. The party picked Baxley.

Alabamians, accustomed to a system where anybody and everybody could vote in a primary, were outraged and took out their frustrations by voting for Hunt. In November, Hunt won the election by 13 points and 56 percent of the vote, receiving the most votes ever for a gubernatorial candidate at that time. Hunt's election surprised many Alabamians since the last Republican governor had left office 113 years earlier, at the end of Reconstruction.

He narrowly won reelection in 1990 after trailing most of the way. Hunt's election is widely credited for beginning the rise of the state Republican Party; only two Democrats have held the office since his tenure, and only one of them by election.

Hunt pushed through major tort reform and tried to bring more industry and tourism to the state, but had to wrangle through massive opposition in the state legislature.

As Governor, Hunt presided over eight executions in Alabama, all by electric chair.

== Criminal charges, 1992 ==
In 1992, the Alabama Supreme Court ruled that taxpayers could sue Hunt for flying on state-owned aircraft to preaching engagements, where Hunt received monetary 'love offerings.' The charges were eventually dropped.

== Criminal charges and conviction ==
A grand jury indicted Hunt for theft, conspiracy, and ethics violations. Prosecutors said that he took over $200,000 from a 1987 inaugural account and used it to for personal use such as marble showers and new lawnmowers. Hunt was found guilty. As the state constitution does not allow convicted felons to hold office, Hunt was forced to resign on April 22, 1993.

Hunt was also ordered to pay $212,000, given five years' probation, and serve 1,000 hours of community service. In February 1998 he asked the state parole board to reduce his probation by four months; the judge instead increased the probation by five years, since he had only paid $4,000 of his $212,000 fine. In April 1998, having served his full sentence and paid his fine, the parole board granted Hunt a pardon.

== 2002 State Senate run ==
Hunt was the Republican nominee in the 2002 Alabama Senate election for the 4th Senate district. He lost to incumbent Democratic Senator Zeb Little, receiving 36.1% of the vote to Little's 61.7%.

== Death ==
Hunt died of lung cancer on January 30, 2009, at the age of 75, after a long illness.

Political offices
| Preceded by George Wallace | Governor of Alabama; January 19, 1987—April 22, 1993 | Succeeded by James E. Folsom Jr. |
Party political offices
| Preceded by Elvin McCary | Republican Party nominee for Governor of Alabama; 1978 (lost) | Succeeded by Emory Folmar |
| Preceded by Emory Folmar | Republican Party nominee for Governor of Alabama; 1986 (won), 1990 (won) | Succeeded by Fob James |
