= Alabama Education Association =

Statewide professional organization

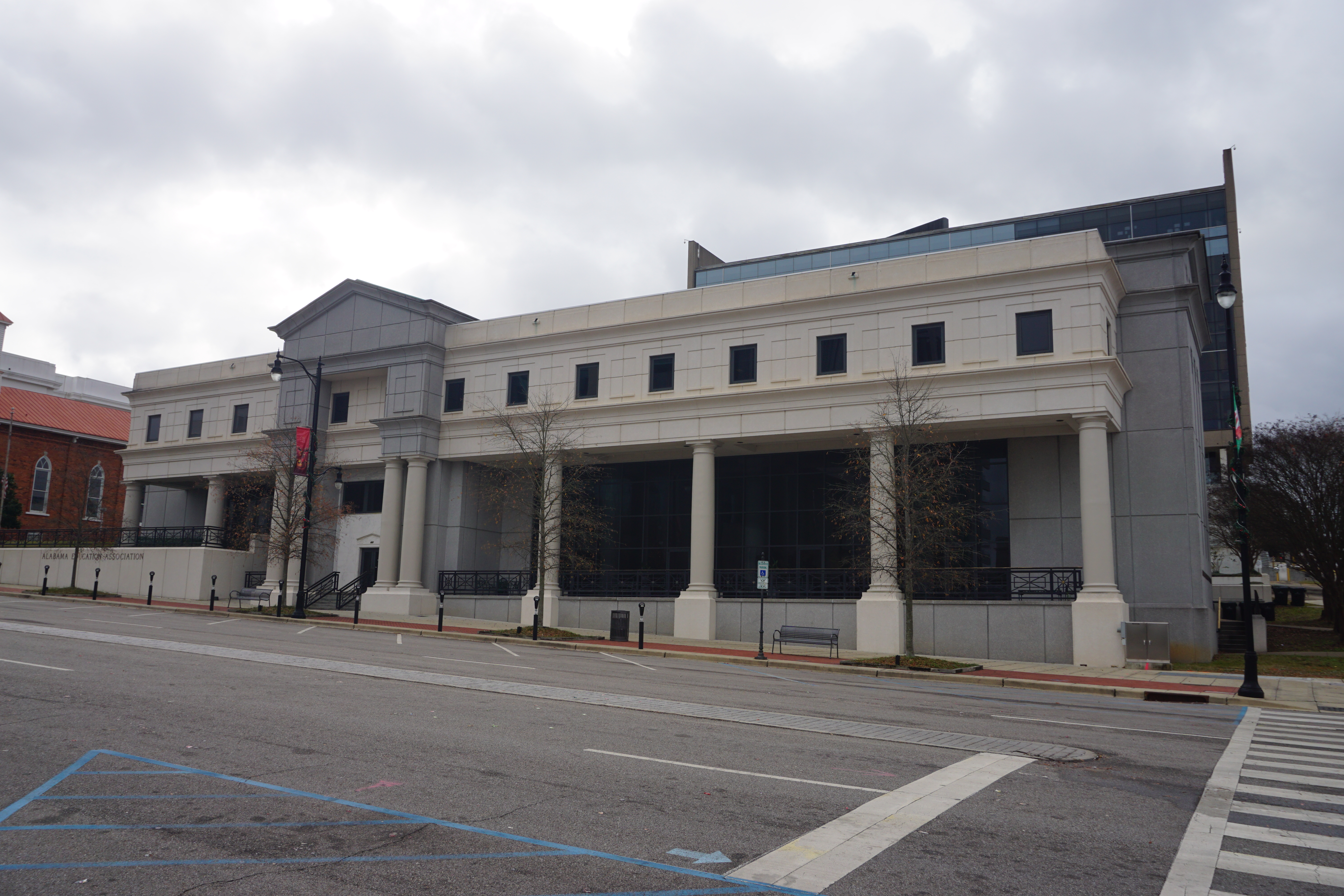
- Montgomery headquarters
- Abbreviation: AEA
- Established: 1856; 170 years ago
- Type: Professional association
- Headquarters: 422 Dexter Avenue; Montgomery, Alabama 36104
- Location: Alabama
- Coordinates: 32.377253°N 86.305874°W
- Fields: Education
- Members: 89,000
- President: Dr. Bridgette Massey Johnson
- Vice President: Mary Beth Tate
- Secretary-Treasurer: Gregory Martin
- Publication: Alabama School Journal
- Subsidiaries: Association of Classroom Teachers, Postsecondary Division, The Administrator Division, Education Support Professionals, Student Alabama Education Association (SAEA), & Retired Educator's Division - Alabama Retirees Education Association (AERA)
- Affiliations: National Education Association
- Website: myaea.org

The Alabama Education Association (AEA) is a statewide professional organization that represents public school employees in the state of Alabama. It is based in the state capital of Montgomery. The AEA is the largest education association in Alabama and is an advocate organization that leads the movement for excellence in education and is the voice of education professionals in Alabama. AEA's mission is to promote education excellence. The AEA provides legal assistance, professional development opportunities, member benefits, and a strong voice for education in the Alabama Legislature. The AEA serves as the advocate for its members and leads in the advancement of equitable and quality public education for Alabama's diverse population. The AEA is an affiliate of the National Education Association (NEA), the nation's largest professional employee organization.

== History ==
One of the mandates of Reconstruction placed on the former Confederate states was that each had to write a new constitution acceptable to Congress before rejoining the Union. Alabama drafted a new state constitution in 1868. In the section on education, the following line was added: "And proper provision shall be made for the education of the children of white and colored persons in separate schools." This helped create a system of education that would come to be known as separate but equal. As a result of this divide, two professional associations arose to represent teachers in the divided schools system. The association to represent teachers in White schools was known as the Alabama Education Association while the one representing teachers in Non-White schools was known as the Alabama State Teachers Association. In 1969, the Alabama Education Association and the Alabama State Teachers Association merged, with Paul R. Hubbert as executive secretary and Joe L. Reed as associate executive secretary.

== Modern era ==
Though it is officially a professional organization, it performs many of the same functions as a trade union, and is thus frequently referred to as such by the news media and other writers, as well as political opponents. (State law prevents public employees from being represented by a union per se, hence the designation.) As a professional association, AEA is not able to call for strikes or participate in collective bargaining.

== See also ==
Education in Alabama
