= William Hooper Councill High School =

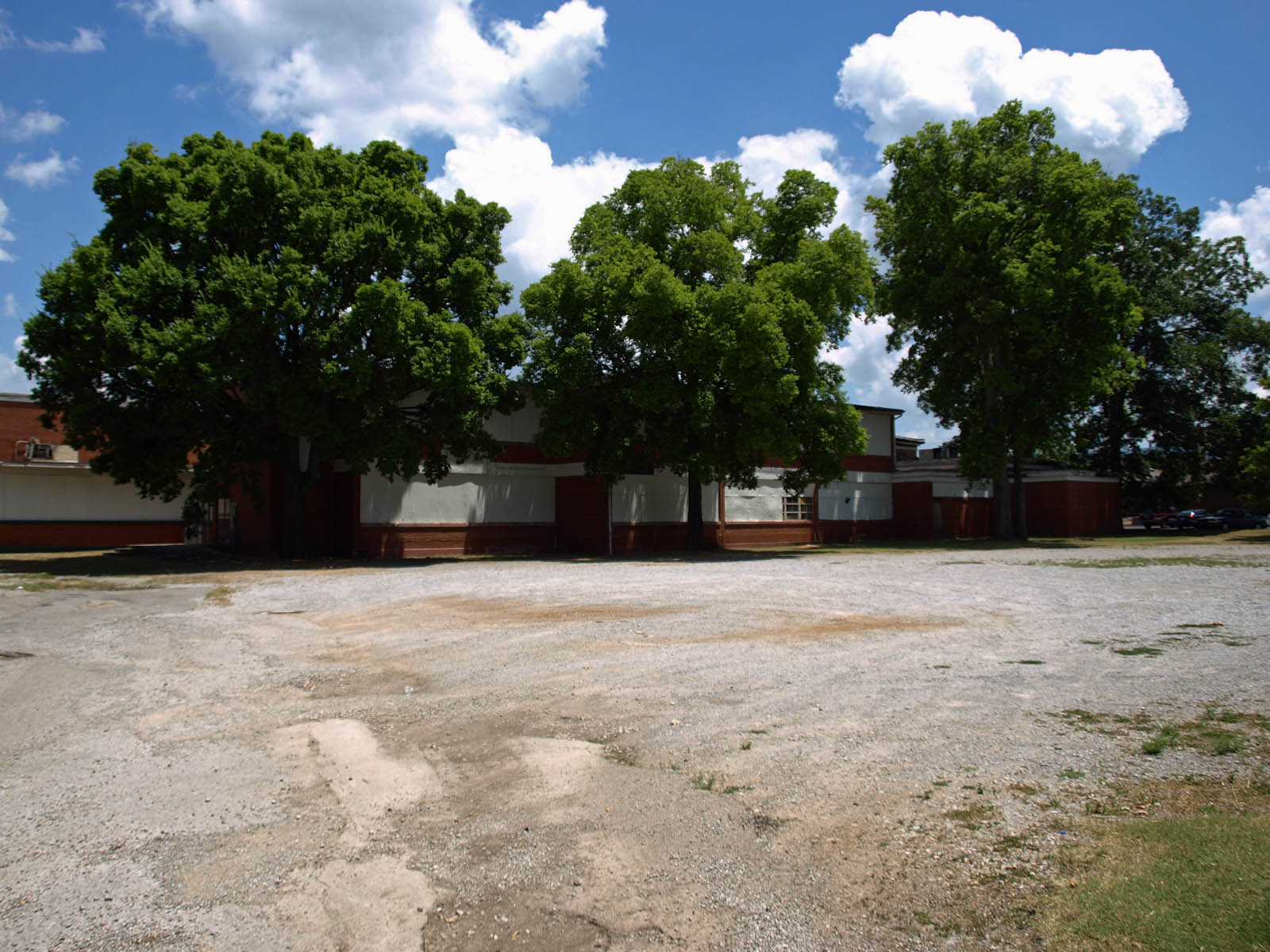
- W. H. Councill High School building in 2010

Location
- 620 St. Clair Avenue; Huntsville, Alabama; United States; 34.7226°N 86.5885°W

Information
- Type: Public
- Opened: 1867
- Closed: 1966
- Grades: 1-12
- Colors: White and blue
- Nickname: Tigers

Alabama Register of Landmarks and Heritage
- Designated: February 2, 2001

William Hooper Councill High School served African American students in Huntsville, Alabama, from 1867 until 1966 and is now the site of William Hooper Councill Memorial Park. The first public school for African Americans in Huntsville, it was named for William Hooper Councill who founded Lincoln School in Huntsville and pushed for its expansion into the state normal school it became in 1875, leading to its becoming Alabama A&M University. The high school has several prominent alumni.

In 1965, its football team was undefeated. The school closed during integration (desegregation) and the last class graduated in 1966. The high school building is extant and is listed on the Alabama Register of Landmarks and Heritage.

Community activists organized to have the school site redeveloped as a park. The park is at 620 St. Clair Avenue next to the Huntsville Madison County Public Library. A bronze statue of Councill is in the park. Statues of children are also planned.

== History ==
Councill Training School, which later became Councill High School, was a school for African American students in Huntsville, Alabama. It was named for William H. Councill who helped found the State Normal School for Negroes in Huntsville (predecessor of Alabama A & M University). He served as the normal school's principal and as the first president of the college that succeeded it. After growing and expanding over the years to include grades through high school, Huntsville's Councill School closed in 1970 after integration. The school's alumni association is working to establish a William Councill High School Park and monument at the site.

Councill and his family were enslaved before the American Civil War. He helped start the Lincoln School, four miles west of Huntsville in 1868. It had 36 students by 1870. He was a teacher, "colored convention" leader, and also served in government offices during the Reconstruction era.

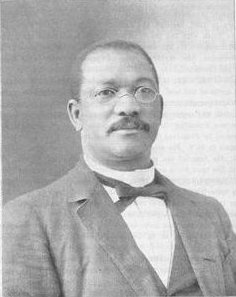
William Hooper Councill

A three-room school building was built in 1919 for the new Councill Training School. It was designed to serve students in grades 1–6. A grant from the Julius Rosenwald Foundation helped pay for the school. In 1948 a new building was constructed and 600 students from grades 1-12 were served. Additional classrooms were built in 1958 and 1962 and enrollment reached 950. In 1968, as integration was enforced, it was changed to being only a high school. It closed in 1970.

Principals at the school were Dr. Charles Orr (1948 – 1953), J.H. Richards (1953 – 1959), and Mr. A.G. Adams (1959 – 1970).

Jeanette Scissum taught at the school.

== Legacy ==
In 2018 the William Hooper Councill Alumni Association broke ground on the William Hooper Councill High School Memorial Park, located on the school's original site. The design mirrors the original floor plan of the school, with paths and benches incorporating bricks from the last school building that had remained on site. Initial work on the park began in 2019, and city officials have announced that in the future the park will feature sculptures of Councill as well as students from Councill High School.

In 2020 AMMU announced the construction of the William Hooper Councill Eternal Flame Memorial, which was described as “a lasting tribute to the visionary founder of AAMU and his enduring fight for education that has positively impacted the United States and beyond.” The Memorial will include a new structure erected at the current gravesite, with the eternal flame set in the center of a walkway.

== Alumni ==
- Marion Blackburn, entrepreneur and tennis professional
- Joseph Lowery, A.M.E. minister and civil rights leader
- John L. Cashin Jr. and his brother Herschel According to Sheryll Cashin he moved on to graduate from Alabama A&M High School on the university's campus in Normal.
- Dr. Sonnie Hereford, civil rights activist who fought school segregation in court
