= 1972 United States presidential election in Alabama =

- November 7, 1972

All 9 Alabama electoral votes to the Electoral College

Nominee	Richard Nixon	George McGovern (Note: The McGovern vote was actually a fusion of two distinct electoral tickets with different electors both pledged to vote for him. One was of the regular Democratic Party and the other of the National Democratic Party of Alabama. At least 219,108 votes were cast for the Democratic ticket and at least 37,815 for the National Democratic ticket, though this sum differs from that in Dave Leip's Atlas.)
Party	Republican	Democratic
Alliance		NDPA
Home state	California	South Dakota
Running mate	Spiro Agnew	Sargent Shriver
Electoral vote	9	0
Popular vote	728,701	256,923
Percentage	72.43%	25.54%
County results
Nixon
40–50%
50–60%
60–70%
70–80%
80–90%
McGovern
50–60%
60–70%
President before election
Richard Nixon
Republican
Elected President
Richard Nixon
Republican

The 1972 United States presidential election in Alabama was held on November 7, 1972. Incumbent President Richard Nixon won Alabama, winning 72.43% of the vote to George McGovern's 25.54%. As of the 2024 presidential election, this is the last election in which Dallas County, Hale County, Russell County, and Perry County in the Black Belt voted for the Republican candidate, and stands as the strongest ever performance by a Republican presidential candidate in the state.

Among white voters, 83% supported Nixon while 14% supported McGovern. Nixon would also be the first presidential candidate since Franklin D. Roosevelt in 1944 to win both Alabama and the election. Alabama and Tennessee were the only states where McGovern won any county that voted for George Wallace in 1968.

== Results ==
1972 United States presidential election in Alabama
Party	Candidate	Votes	%	±%
Republican	Richard Nixon (inc.)	728,701	72.43%	+58.44%
Democratic	George McGovern	219,108	21.73%	+21.73%
NDPA	George McGovern	36,560	3.62%	−15.10%
American Independent	John G. Schmitz	11,355	1.13%	−65.87%
Prohibition	E. Harold Munn	7,872	0.79%	+0.43%
Total votes		1,006,093	100%	

=== Results by presidential elector ===
General election results
Party	Pledged to	Elector	Votes
Republican Party	Richard Nixon (incumbent)	Bentley Owens	728,701
Republican Party	Richard Nixon (incumbent)	Jerry Crabtree	728,209
Republican Party	Richard Nixon (incumbent)	Owen Leach	727,271
Republican Party	Richard Nixon (incumbent)	B. Ray Holland	727,098
Republican Party	Richard Nixon (incumbent)	Bert Nettles	727,034
Republican Party	Richard Nixon (incumbent)	Jeff Sessions, Jr.	726,434
Republican Party	Richard Nixon (incumbent)	Ann Smith Bedsole	726,374
Republican Party	Richard Nixon (incumbent)	Ruth S. Sullivan	723,075
Republican Party	Richard Nixon (incumbent)	Doug Hale	723,043
Democratic Party	George McGovern	Albert Raines	219,108
Democratic Party	George McGovern	Carl Elliott	217,576
Democratic Party	George McGovern	Ryan deGraffenried	216,410
Democratic Party	George McGovern	Lucius Amerson	212,078
Democratic Party	George McGovern	Barret Sheldon, Sr.	212,023
Democratic Party	George McGovern	J. E. Brantley	211,562
Democratic Party	George McGovern	Leola Williams	211,220
Democratic Party	George McGovern	Barney Weeks	211,158
Democratic Party	George McGovern	Ray Hartwell	210,895
National Democratic Party of Alabama	George McGovern	J. H. Davis	38,324
National Democratic Party of Alabama	George McGovern	J. W. Flowers	37,815
National Democratic Party of Alabama	George McGovern	Wadine V. Williams	36,560
National Democratic Party of Alabama	George McGovern	Freddie C. Rogers	36,230
National Democratic Party of Alabama	George McGovern	Jo Crawford	36,210
National Democratic Party of Alabama	George McGovern	Charlie Burgess	36,061
National Democratic Party of Alabama	George McGovern	John Hulett	35,941
National Democratic Party of Alabama	George McGovern	Alex Hurder	35,498
National Democratic Party of Alabama	George McGovern	Yvonne Gannon	33,823
American Independent Party	John G. Schmitz	June Carter	11,918
American Independent Party	John G. Schmitz	Cloyd V. Smith	11,674
American Independent Party	John G. Schmitz	Margaret Tyson Badham	11,621
American Independent Party	John G. Schmitz	S. L. Ledbetter	11,510
American Independent Party	John G. Schmitz	William G. Mori	11,355
American Independent Party	John G. Schmitz	T. F. Randolph	11,298
American Independent Party	John G. Schmitz	Ronnie Helms	11,183
American Independent Party	John G. Schmitz	Michaels S. "Mike" Vaugh	11,101
American Independent Party	John G. Schmitz	H. Radue	10,832
Prohibition Party	E. Harold Munn	W. C. Bentley	8,551
Prohibition Party	E. Harold Munn	Geraldine Hughes	8,524
Prohibition Party	E. Harold Munn	Pres Waldrop	8,451
Prohibition Party	E. Harold Munn	Thomas E. Lee	8,375
Prohibition Party	E. Harold Munn	Nannie Myrtle Pegues	8,322
Prohibition Party	E. Harold Munn	Clara Miller	8,315
Prohibition Party	E. Harold Munn	Lois Butterworth	8,060
Prohibition Party	E. Harold Munn	Robert Argo	7,946
Prohibition Party	E. Harold Munn	Ira Pegues	7,872
Total votes			1,006,602

=== Results by county ===
County	Richard Nixon Republican		George McGovern Democratic		Various candidates Other parties		Margin		Total votes cast
County	#	%	#	%	#	%	#	%	Total votes cast
Autauga	5,367	75.17%	1,593	22.31%	180	2.52%	3,774	52.86%	7,140
Baldwin	15,104	82.20%	2,923	15.91%	348	1.89%	12,181	66.29%	18,375
Barbour	4,985	70.92%	1,846	26.26%	198	2.82%	3,139	44.66%	7,029
Bibb	3,332	78.44%	837	19.70%	79	1.86%	2,495	58.74%	4,248
Blount	6,486	79.36%	1,582	19.36%	105	1.28%	4,904	60.00%	8,173
Bullock	2,178	47.44%	2,321	50.56%	92	2.00%	-143	-3.12%	4,591
Butler	4,685	76.45%	1,401	22.86%	42	0.69%	3,284	53.59%	6,128
Calhoun	20,364	76.93%	5,832	22.03%	275	1.04%	14,532	54.90%	26,471
Chambers	8,716	79.21%	2,076	18.87%	211	1.92%	6,640	60.34%	11,003
Cherokee	3,179	71.89%	1,182	26.73%	61	1.38%	1,997	45.16%	4,422
Chilton	7,349	82.88%	1,356	15.29%	162	1.83%	5,993	67.59%	8,867
Choctaw	3,055	60.74%	1,934	38.45%	41	0.82%	1,121	22.29%	5,030
Clarke	5,256	70.89%	2,031	27.39%	127	1.71%	3,225	43.50%	7,414
Clay	3,948	88.24%	507	11.33%	19	0.42%	3,441	76.91%	4,474
Cleburne	3,420	85.20%	581	14.47%	13	0.32%	2,839	70.73%	4,014
Coffee	9,076	80.06%	2,160	19.05%	100	0.88%	6,916	61.01%	11,336
Colbert	11,215	67.71%	4,811	29.04%	538	3.25%	6,404	38.67%	16,564
Conecuh	3,214	74.81%	1,042	24.26%	40	0.93%	2,172	50.55%	4,296
Coosa	2,672	77.20%	773	22.33%	16	0.46%	1,899	54.87%	3,461
Covington	9,278	85.27%	1,547	14.22%	56	0.51%	7,731	71.05%	10,881
Crenshaw	3,129	72.87%	1,085	25.27%	80	1.86%	2,044	47.60%	4,294
Cullman	14,390	79.54%	3,571	19.74%	130	0.72%	10,819	59.80%	18,091
Dale	8,346	83.14%	1,594	15.88%	98	0.98%	6,752	67.26%	10,038
Dallas	8,644	60.53%	5,427	38.00%	209	1.46%	3,217	22.53%	14,280
DeKalb	9,434	71.27%	3,759	28.40%	44	0.33%	5,675	42.87%	13,237
Elmore	8,461	79.90%	1,891	17.86%	238	2.25%	6,570	62.04%	10,590
Escambia	7,883	82.19%	1,598	16.66%	110	1.15%	6,285	65.53%	9,591
Etowah	20,851	72.95%	7,372	25.79%	358	1.25%	13,479	47.16%	28,581
Fayette	4,240	83.53%	836	16.47%	0	0.00%	3,404	67.06%	5,076
Franklin	5,877	75.23%	1,840	23.55%	95	1.22%	4,037	51.68%	7,812
Geneva	5,851	84.33%	1,049	15.12%	38	0.55%	4,802	69.21%	6,938
Greene	1,404	29.65%	3,235	68.32%	96	2.03%	-1,831	-38.67%	4,735
Hale	2,859	59.22%	1,779	36.85%	190	3.94%	1,080	22.37%	4,828
Henry	3,414	79.56%	853	19.88%	24	0.56%	2,561	59.68%	4,291
Houston	12,622	83.46%	2,358	15.59%	144	0.95%	10,264	67.87%	15,124
Jackson	6,202	65.91%	2,985	31.72%	223	2.37%	3,217	34.19%	9,410
Jefferson	135,095	68.05%	57,288	28.86%	6,145	3.10%	77,807	39.19%	198,528
Lamar	3,283	80.56%	766	18.80%	26	0.64%	2,517	61.76%	4,075
Lauderdale	14,410	71.66%	5,112	25.42%	586	2.91%	9,298	46.24%	20,108
Lawrence	4,433	75.61%	1,416	24.15%	14	0.24%	3,017	51.46%	5,863
Lee	11,571	74.94%	3,622	23.46%	248	1.61%	7,949	51.48%	15,441
Limestone	6,188	73.21%	2,079	24.60%	185	2.19%	4,109	48.61%	8,452
Lowndes	1,990	42.69%	2,559	54.90%	112	2.40%	-569	-12.21%	4,661
Macon	1,931	33.04%	3,636	62.21%	278	4.76%	-1,705	-29.17%	5,845
Madison	38,899	73.42%	13,108	24.74%	977	1.84%	25,791	48.68%	52,984
Marengo	5,156	65.05%	2,645	33.37%	125	1.58%	2,511	31.68%	7,926
Marion	5,927	85.38%	986	14.20%	29	0.42%	4,941	71.18%	6,942
Marshall	12,090	74.45%	3,894	23.98%	254	1.56%	8,196	50.47%	16,238
Mobile	62,639	73.15%	20,694	24.17%	2,301	2.69%	41,945	48.98%	85,634
Monroe	5,155	74.82%	1,636	23.74%	99	1.44%	3,519	51.08%	6,890
Montgomery	35,353	71.86%	12,723	25.86%	1,121	2.28%	22,630	46.00%	49,197
Morgan	18,100	76.85%	5,004	21.25%	449	1.91%	13,096	55.60%	23,553
Perry	2,800	49.13%	2,718	47.69%	181	3.18%	82	1.44%	5,699
Pickens	4,071	67.33%	1,933	31.97%	42	0.69%	2,138	35.36%	6,046
Pike	5,690	76.66%	1,624	21.88%	108	1.46%	4,066	54.78%	7,422
Randolph	4,427	75.14%	1,330	22.57%	135	2.29%	3,097	52.57%	5,892
Russell	6,034	66.73%	2,644	29.24%	365	4.04%	3,390	37.49%	9,043
St. Clair	6,952	79.82%	1,538	17.66%	220	2.53%	5,414	62.16%	8,710
Shelby	9,390	81.24%	1,859	16.08%	309	2.67%	7,531	65.16%	11,558
Sumter	2,686	49.19%	2,737	50.12%	38	0.70%	-51	-0.93%	5,461
Talladega	12,763	73.12%	4,567	26.16%	125	0.72%	8,196	46.96%	17,455
Tallapoosa	8,535	78.71%	2,113	19.49%	195	1.80%	6,422	59.22%	10,843
Tuscaloosa	21,172	70.15%	8,272	27.41%	735	2.44%	12,900	42.74%	30,179
Walker	14,581	78.79%	3,724	20.12%	202	1.09%	10,857	58.67%	18,507
Washington	3,282	74.73%	1,096	24.95%	14	0.32%	2,186	49.78%	4,392
Wilcox	2,641	44.42%	3,254	54.74%	50	0.84%	-613	-10.32%	5,945
Winston	4,971	86.14%	779	13.50%	21	0.36%	4,192	72.64%	5,771
Totals	728,701	72.43%	256,923	25.54%	20,469	2.03%	471,778	46.89%	1,006,093

=== Results by congressional district ===
Nixon won a majority of the vote in all of Alabama's 7 congressional districts.

District	Nixon	McGovern
1st	75.7%	24.3%
2nd	77.5%	22.5%
3rd	74.7%	25.3%
4th	77.6%	22.4%
5th	74.6%	25.4%
6th	72.2%	27.8%
7th	66%	34%

== See also ==
- United States presidential elections in Alabama

== Works cited ==
- Black, Earl; Black, Merle (1992). The Vital South: How Presidents Are Elected. Harvard University Press. ISBN 0674941306.
