= 1968 United States presidential election in Alabama =

- November 5, 1968

All 10 Alabama electoral votes to the Electoral College

Nominee	George Wallace	Hubert Humphrey	Richard Nixon
Party	Alabama Democratic	NDPA	Republican
Alliance	AIP	Democratic
Home state	Alabama	Minnesota	New York (Note: Although he was born in California and he served as a U.S. senator from California, in 1968 Richard Nixon's official state of residence was New York, because he moved there to practice law after his defeat in the 1962 California gubernatorial election. During his first term as president, Nixon re-established his residency in California. Consequently, most reliable reference books list Nixon's home state as New York in the 1968 election and his home state as California in the 1972 (and 1960) election.)
Running mate	Curtis LeMay	Edmund Muskie	Spiro Agnew
Electoral vote	10	0	0
Popular vote	691,425	196,579	146,923
Percentage	65.86%	18.72%	13.99%
County results
Wallace
40–50%
50–60%
60–70%
70–80%
80–90%
90–100%
Humphrey
40–50%
50–60%
60–70%
President before election
Lyndon B. Johnson
Democratic
Elected President
Richard Nixon
Republican

The 1968 United States presidential election in Alabama was held on November 5, 1968. In Alabama, voters voted for electors individually instead of as a slate, as in the other 49 states.

The 1960s had seen Alabama as the epicenter of the Civil Rights Movement, highlighted by numerous bombings by the Ku Klux Klan in "Bombingham", Birmingham police commissioner Eugene "Bull" Connor's use of attack dogs against civil rights protesters, attacks on the Freedom Riders and Selma to Montgomery marchers, and first-term Governor George Wallace's "stand in the door" against the desegregation of the University of Alabama. The state Democratic Party, which had remained closed to African-Americans two decades after Smith v. Allwright outlawed the white primary, had by a five-to-one margin refused to pledge its 1964 electors to incumbent President Lyndon B. Johnson, and no attempt was made to challenge this Wallace-sponsored Democratic slate with one loyal to the national party. Despite sponsoring the state Democratic slate, in the 1964 general election Wallace would back Republican nominee Barry Goldwater, who won almost seventy percent of Alabama's ballots against the state Democratic electors, for his opposition to the Civil Rights Act of 1964.

George Wallace would build a third party candidacy with his right-wing populist American Independent Party during the following two years, campaigning on opposition to desegregation, race riots, and the counterculture. However, with the state Democratic Party still refusing to integrate, the national party made efforts to place its own electors on the Alabama ballot in 1967. As expected, Wallace won the state Democratic primary in May, and was listed as the “Democratic” candidate on the Alabama ballot. National Democratic nominee Hubert Humphrey was able, unlike Harry S. Truman and outgoing President Johnson, to gain ballot access on a fusion of the "Alabama Independent Democrat" and National Democratic lines. Among white voters, 78% supported Wallace, 16% supported Nixon, and 4% supported Humphrey.

== Predictions ==
Source	Rating	As of	Note
Lebanon Daily News	Safe I (Flip)	September 17, 1968	(Note: “I” refers to Wallace's national status as the candidate of the American Independent Party, although the Alabama Democratic Party had him listed on the state ballot as the “Democratic” candidate)
Daily Press	Certain I (Flip)	October 11, 1968	(Note: “I” refers to Wallace's national status as the candidate of the American Independent Party, although the Alabama Democratic Party had him listed on the state ballot as the “Democratic” candidate)
The Charlotte News	Certain I (Flip)	October 12, 1968	(Note: “I” refers to Wallace's national status as the candidate of the American Independent Party, although the Alabama Democratic Party had him listed on the state ballot as the “Democratic” candidate)
The Record	Likely I (Flip)	October 21, 1968	(Note: “I” refers to Wallace's national status as the candidate of the American Independent Party, although the Alabama Democratic Party had him listed on the state ballot as the “Democratic” candidate)
Shreveport Times	Safe I (Flip)	November 3, 1968	(Note: “I” refers to Wallace's national status as the candidate of the American Independent Party, although the Alabama Democratic Party had him listed on the state ballot as the “Democratic” candidate)
The Selma Times-Journal	Safe I (Flip)	November 3, 1968	(Note: “I” refers to Wallace's national status as the candidate of the American Independent Party, although the Alabama Democratic Party had him listed on the state ballot as the “Democratic” candidate)

== Results ==
1968 United States presidential election in Alabama
Party	Candidate	Votes	%	±%
Democratic	George Wallace	691,425	65.86%	+65.86%
NDPA	Hubert Humphrey	196,597	18.72%	+18.72%
Republican	Richard Nixon	146,923	13.99%	−55.51%
American Independent	No Candidate	10,960	1.04%	+1.04%
Prohibition	E. Harold Munn	4,002	0.38%	+0.38%
Write-in		8	0.00%	+0.00%
Total votes		1,049,915	100.00%	

=== Results by presidential elector ===
General election results
Party	Pledged to	Elector	Votes
Democratic Party	George Wallace	Albert Brewer	691,425
Democratic Party	George Wallace	MacDonald Gallion	691,318
Democratic Party	George Wallace	Jim Allen	689,262
Democratic Party	George Wallace	Armistead Selden	689,009
Democratic Party	George Wallace	Agnes Baggett	687,876
Democratic Party	George Wallace	Frank Mizell	687,699
Democratic Party	George Wallace	Earl Morgan	687,664
Democratic Party	George Wallace	Richard "Dick" Beard	686,685
Democratic Party	George Wallace	Mabel S. Amos	686,667
Democratic Party	George Wallace	Ernest Stone	685,499
Republican Party	Richard Nixon	William H. Graham	146,923
Republican Party	Richard Nixon	Paul Lowery	146,876
Republican Party	Richard Nixon	James C. Van Antwerp, Jr.	146,717
Republican Party	Richard Nixon	George Howard Young	146,628
Republican Party	Richard Nixon	Huit Sullivan	146,613
Republican Party	Richard Nixon	M. J. Lyons, Jr.	146,591
Republican Party	Richard Nixon	Lee Clyde Traylor	146,368
Republican Party	Richard Nixon	Robert H. Maxwell	146,311
Republican Party	Richard Nixon	J. Smith Lanier, II	145,970
Republican Party	Richard Nixon	Robert D. Wilkinson, Jr.	145,694
Alabama Independent Democratic Party	Hubert Humphrey	Dot Little	142,435
Alabama Independent Democratic Party	Hubert Humphrey	Ben F. Ray	142,218
Alabama Independent Democratic Party	Hubert Humphrey	Lafayette Patterson	141,199
Alabama Independent Democratic Party	Hubert Humphrey	Roy D. McCord	141,124
Alabama Independent Democratic Party	Hubert Humphrey	Charles A. Bentley, Jr.	140,728
Alabama Independent Democratic Party	Hubert Humphrey	Isom Clemon	140,387
Alabama Independent Democratic Party	Hubert Humphrey	Coleman A. Lollar, Jr.	140,386
Alabama Independent Democratic Party	Hubert Humphrey	J. E. Brantley	140,342
Alabama Independent Democratic Party	Hubert Humphrey	James McArthur Reed	140,218
Alabama Independent Democratic Party	Hubert Humphrey	Joe L. Reed	140,093
National Democratic Party of Alabama	Hubert Humphrey	William McKinley Branch	54,144
National Democratic Party of Alabama	Hubert Humphrey	E. D. Bouier	53,700
National Democratic Party of Alabama	Hubert Humphrey	Robert Schwenn	53,666
National Democratic Party of Alabama	Hubert Humphrey	J. H. Davis	53,622
National Democratic Party of Alabama	Hubert Humphrey	R. E. Cordray	53,264
National Democratic Party of Alabama	Hubert Humphrey	Billy Joe Robinson	53,226
National Democratic Party of Alabama	Hubert Humphrey	Jack Drake	53,068
National Democratic Party of Alabama	Hubert Humphrey	Virginia Durr	53,015
National Democratic Party of Alabama	Hubert Humphrey	George DeBoer	52,909
National Democratic Party of Alabama	Hubert Humphrey	James Williams	52,464
American Independent Party	George Wallace	Steve E. Nation	10,960
American Independent Party	George Wallace	Aaron C. Edwards	10,518
American Independent Party	George Wallace	Ronald L. Pankey	10,437
American Independent Party	George Wallace	Bernice H. Morrison	10,365
Prohibition Party	E. Harold Munn	D. N. Stephenson	4,022
Prohibition Party	E. Harold Munn	Phoebe Cary Shoemaker	3,814
Prohibition Party	E. Harold Munn	J. E. Dillard	3,770
Prohibition Party	E. Harold Munn	Ogburn A. Gardner	3,661
Prohibition Party	E. Harold Munn	Bertha Wallis Lee	3,638
Prohibition Party	E. Harold Munn	Beulah K. Gray	3,615
Prohibition Party	E. Harold Munn	Jerome B. Couch	3,589
Prohibition Party	E. Harold Munn	Fred M. Burns	3,578
Prohibition Party	E. Harold Munn	Lois Goodwin	3,523
Prohibition Party	E. Harold Munn	Daisy Williams	3,420
Total votes			1,049,909

=== Results by county ===
County	George Wallace American Independent		Hubert Humphrey Democratic		Richard Nixon Republican		Various candidates Other parties		Margin		Total votes cast
County	#	%	#	%	#	%	#	%	#	%	Total votes cast
Autauga	5,523	71.03%	1,553	19.97%	606	7.79%	94	1.21%	3,970	51.06%	7,776
Baldwin	14,167	76.98%	1,821	9.89%	2,154	11.70%	262	1.42%	12,013 (Note: In this county where Nixon rather than Humphrey ran second behind Wallace, margin given is Wallace vote minus Nixon vote and percentage margin Wallace percentage minus Nixon percentage.)	65.28%	18,404
Barbour	5,491	69.10%	1,898	23.89%	386	4.86%	171	2.15%	3,593	45.21%	7,946
Bibb	3,746	80.16%	652	13.95%	263	5.63%	12	0.26%	3,094	66.21%	4,673
Blount	6,536	71.93%	331	3.64%	2,013	22.15%	206	2.27%	4,523	49.78%	9,086
Bullock	2,161	49.71%	1,964	45.18%	190	4.37%	32	0.74%	197	4.53%	4,347
Butler	5,601	76.09%	1,240	16.85%	500	6.79%	20	0.27%	4,361	59.24%	7,361
Calhoun	19,211	71.75%	4,146	15.48%	3,061	11.43%	357	1.33%	15,065	56.27%	26,775
Chambers	7,885	74.14%	1,358	12.77%	1,082	10.17%	311	2.92%	6,527	61.37%	10,636
Cherokee	4,773	83.96%	462	8.13%	343	6.03%	107	1.88%	4,311	75.83%	5,685
Chilton	6,611	74.26%	566	6.36%	1,602	18.00%	123	1.38%	5,009	56.26%	8,902
Choctaw	4,250	69.75%	1,641	26.93%	176	2.89%	26	0.43%	2,609	42.82%	6,093
Clarke	6,168	71.50%	1,717	19.90%	488	5.66%	253	2.93%	4,451	51.60%	8,626
Clay	4,048	80.25%	256	5.08%	706	14.00%	34	0.67%	3,342	66.25%	5,044
Cleburne	3,314	82.95%	160	4.01%	485	12.14%	36	0.90%	2,829	70.81%	3,995
Coffee	8,885	82.53%	1,071	9.95%	682	6.33%	128	1.19%	7,814	72.58%	10,766
Colbert	11,341	72.60%	2,291	14.67%	1,727	11.06%	262	1.68%	9,050	57.93%	15,621
Conecuh	3,828	71.60%	1,151	21.53%	186	3.48%	181	3.39%	2,677	50.07%	5,346
Coosa	2,830	74.26%	623	16.35%	330	8.66%	28	0.73%	2,207	57.91%	3,811
Covington	11,419	86.98%	791	6.03%	831	6.33%	87	0.66%	10,588	80.65%	13,128
Crenshaw	4,513	82.35%	726	13.25%	209	3.81%	32	0.58%	3,787	69.10%	5,480
Cullman	11,063	64.08%	1,115	6.46%	4,964	28.75%	123	0.71%	6,099	35.33%	17,265
Dale	8,109	83.55%	862	8.88%	607	6.25%	127	1.31%	7,247	74.67%	9,705
Dallas	8,798	52.89%	6,516	39.17%	1,246	7.49%	76	0.46%	2,282	13.72%	16,636
DeKalb	8,144	54.81%	1,274	8.57%	5,314	35.76%	127	0.85%	2,830	19.05%	14,859
Elmore	9,038	76.52%	1,745	14.77%	801	6.78%	228	1.93%	7,293	61.75%	11,812
Escambia	8,474	78.72%	1,492	13.86%	680	6.32%	119	1.11%	6,982	64.86%	10,765
Etowah	21,416	68.67%	4,613	14.79%	4,351	13.95%	806	2.58%	16,803	53.88%	31,186
Fayette	4,683	75.07%	676	10.84%	827	13.26%	52	0.83%	3,856	61.81%	6,238
Franklin	5,909	64.96%	588	6.46%	2,524	27.75%	75	0.82%	3,385	37.21%	9,096
Geneva	7,871	91.73%	380	4.43%	284	3.31%	46	0.54%	7,491	87.30%	8,581
Greene	1,555	39.18%	2,229	56.16%	180	4.54%	5	0.13%	-674	-16.98%	3,969
Hale	2,934	55.78%	2,003	38.08%	266	5.06%	57	1.08%	931	17.70%	5,260
Henry	4,233	79.99%	955	18.05%	84	1.59%	20	0.38%	3,278	61.94%	5,292
Houston	13,872	83.89%	1,488	9.00%	974	5.89%	202	1.22%	12,384	74.89%	16,536
Jackson	8,504	77.96%	1,022	9.37%	1,191	10.92%	191	1.75%	7,313	67.04%	10,908
Jefferson	106,233	51.81%	55,845	27.24%	39,752	19.39%	3,203	1.56%	50,388	24.57%	205,033
Lamar	5,229	88.25%	302	5.10%	364	6.14%	30	0.51%	4,865	82.11%	5,925
Lauderdale	13,467	71.32%	2,166	11.47%	2,952	15.63%	298	1.58%	10,515	55.69%	18,883
Lawrence	6,253	83.05%	650	8.63%	580	7.70%	46	0.61%	5,603	74.42%	7,529
Lee	7,721	58.78%	2,803	21.34%	2,366	18.01%	246	1.87%	4,918	37.44%	13,136
Limestone	8,430	81.25%	889	8.57%	870	8.39%	186	1.79%	7,541	72.68%	10,375
Lowndes	1,822	55.84%	1,127	34.54%	234	7.17%	80	2.45%	695	21.30%	3,263
Macon	1,619	25.37%	4,450	69.74%	257	4.03%	55	0.86%	-2,831	-44.37%	6,381
Madison	29,823	57.40%	8,004	15.41%	13,213	25.43%	913	1.76%	16,610	31.97%	51,953
Marengo	5,185	56.64%	3,479	38.01%	457	4.99%	33	0.36%	1,706	18.63%	9,154
Marion	6,415	76.34%	365	4.34%	1,492	17.76%	131	1.56%	4,923	58.58%	8,403
Marshall	12,742	76.39%	955	5.73%	2,725	16.34%	258	1.55%	10,017	60.05%	16,680
Mobile	61,673	67.08%	18,615	20.25%	10,509	11.43%	1,139	1.24%	43,058	46.83%	91,936
Monroe	5,217	71.23%	1,673	22.84%	375	5.12%	59	0.81%	3,544	48.39%	7,324
Montgomery	27,202	58.47%	12,088	25.98%	6,746	14.50%	489	1.05%	15,114	32.49%	46,525
Morgan	16,841	75.60%	1,878	8.43%	3,043	13.66%	515	2.31%	13,798	61.94%	22,277
Perry	2,768	49.85%	2,457	44.25%	308	5.55%	20	0.36%	311	5.60%	5,553
Pickens	4,549	71.89%	1,434	22.66%	321	5.07%	24	0.38%	3,115	49.23%	6,328
Pike	6,038	72.39%	1,565	18.76%	658	7.89%	80	0.96%	4,473	53.63%	8,341
Randolph	5,103	75.00%	666	9.79%	839	12.33%	196	2.88%	4,264	62.67%	6,804
Russell	7,584	67.44%	2,707	24.07%	704	6.26%	250	2.22%	4,877	43.37%	11,245
St. Clair	7,050	72.70%	869	8.96%	1,635	16.86%	143	1.47%	5,415	55.84%	9,697
Shelby	7,736	71.83%	1,105	10.26%	1,706	15.84%	223	2.07%	6,030	55.99%	10,770
Sumter	2,158	44.89%	2,336	48.60%	303	6.30%	10	0.21%	-178	-3.71%	4,807
Talladega	13,505	72.00%	3,099	16.52%	1,935	10.32%	217	1.16%	10,406	55.48%	18,756
Tallapoosa	9,043	76.50%	1,331	11.26%	1,205	10.19%	242	2.05%	7,712	65.24%	11,821
Tuscaloosa	18,611	65.60%	5,556	19.58%	3,822	13.47%	382	1.35%	13,055	46.02%	28,371
Walker	14,416	74.37%	1,971	10.17%	2,628	13.56%	370	1.91%	11,788	60.81%	19,385
Washington	4,545	79.98%	902	15.87%	200	3.52%	36	0.63%	3,643	64.11%	5,683
Wilcox	2,511	56.62%	1,658	37.38%	237	5.34%	29	0.65%	853	19.24%	4,435
Winston	3,032	54.86%	258	4.67%	2,174	39.33%	63	1.14%	858	15.53%	5,527
Totals	691,425	65.86%	196,579	18.72%	146,923	13.99%	14,990	1.42%	494,846	47.14%	1,049,917

==== Counties that flipped from Republican to American Independent ====
- Autauga
- Baldwin
- Barbour
- Bibb
- Blount
- Butler
- Calhoun
- Chambers
- Chilton
- Choctaw
- Clarke
- Clay
- Cleburne
- Coffee
- Conecuh
- Coosa
- Covington
- Crenshaw
- Cullman
- Dale
- Dallas
- DeKalb
- Elmore
- Escambia
- Etowah
- Fayette
- Franklin
- Geneva
- Hale
- Henry
- Houston
- Jefferson
- Lee
- Lawrence
- Madison
- Marengo
- Marion
- Marshall
- Monroe
- Morgan
- Mobile
- Montgomery
- Shelby
- Perry
- Pickens
- Pike
- Randolph
- Russell
- St. Clair
- Talladega
- Tallapoosa
- Tuscaloosa
- Walker
- Washington
- Winston
- Bullock
- Lowndes
- Wilcox

==== Counties that flipped from Republican to Democratic ====
- Greene
- Sumter

==== Counties that flipped from Unpledged to Democratic ====
- Macon

==== Counties that flipped from Unpledged to American Independent ====
- Cherokee
- Colbert
- Jackson
- Lauderdale
- Limestone

=== Results by congressional district ===
George Wallace won all 8 congressional districts in Alabama.

District	Nixon	Humphrey	Wallace
1st	9.8%	21.4%	68.8%
2nd	10.4%	18.8%	70.8%
3rd	7.7%	18.6%	73.7%
4th	11%	16.6%	72.4%
5th	10.3%	27.9%	61.8%
6th	23.5%	28.6%	48%
7th	20.2%	8.8%	71%
8th	17.4%	12.5%	70%

Humphrey's performance by county; shaded according by his share of the vote

== Analysis ==
Wallace won his home state in a landslide, receiving 65.86 percent of the vote to Democrat Hubert Humphrey's 18.72 percent, a 47.13-point margin. Republican Richard Nixon, while winning the election nationally, finished a distant third in Alabama with only 13.99 percent, gaining significant support only in a few northern counties with historical Unionist sympathies and higher-income urban areas. Wallace's 65.86 percent of the popular vote would make Alabama not only his best-performing state in the 1968 election, but the strongest-performing state out of any candidate, with only Humphrey's performance in Washington D.C. being stronger.

Wallace won 64 of the state's 67 counties. As African-Americans in the South were slowly gaining the right to vote as a result of federal civil rights legislation passed in 1964 and 1965, Wallace's weakest region was the Black Belt, where he won most counties with narrow majorities or pluralities.

As of the 2024 presidential election, this is the last election in which Mobile County, Shelby County, Baldwin County, Lee County, and Houston County were not carried by the Republican candidate, the last election in which the Republican candidate won the election without Alabama, and the last election in which Wilcox County, Lowndes County, and Bullock County were not carried by the national Democratic candidate.

== See also ==
- United States presidential elections in Alabama

== Works cited ==
- Black, Earl; Black, Merle (1992). The Vital South: How Presidents Are Elected. Harvard University Press. ISBN 0674941306.
