= James Paulk =

Member of the Alabama House of Representatives

Member of the Alabama House of Representatives from the 31st district
- In office 1963–1971
- Preceded by: M.B. McLendon
- Succeeded by: Thomas Reed

Personal details
- Born: James Livingston Paulk; June 2, 1920 Union Springs, Alabama, U.S.
- Died: August 6, 2005 (aged 85)
- Party: Democratic
- Spouse: Martha Elizabeth Ward
- Children: 2

James Livingston Paulk (June 2, 1920 – August 6, 2005) was an American politician who served in the Alabama House of Representatives as a member of the Democratic Party. He was active in local politics in Bullock County before his election to the state legislature. He served until his defeat by Thomas Reed, the first black person elected to the state legislature since Reconstruction. Paulk remained active in local politics until his death.

== Early life ==
James Livingston Paulk was born in Union Springs, Alabama, on June 2, 1920, to Livingston and Bonnie Paulk. He married Martha Elizabeth Ward, with whom he had two children, on April 11, 1942.

== Career ==
=== Local politics ===
Paulk was appointed to the Bullock County Recreation Board in 1956, and elected to the Bullock County Board of Education in 1958. During his tenure on the county board of education he served as vice-chair. Sam T. Hall Jr. was selected to replace Paulk on the county board of education after he resigned to join the state legislature. Paulk served on the South Bullock Water and Fire Protection Authority after leaving the state legislature.

=== State legislature ===
Paulk ran for a seat in the Alabama House of Representatives in the 1962 election and defeated incumbent Representative M.B. McLendon for the Democratic nomination in the runoff primary. Legislative reapportionment reduced the amount of seats in Bullock from two to one and L.O. Russell, who defeated incumbent Representative J.B. Powell, withdrew. He won in the general election without opposition. Paulk won the Democratic nomination for the 31st district against Thomas Reed and J.P. Guzman and won in the 1964 general election without opposition.

Paulk defeated Reed in the Democratic primary during the 1970 election. Reed challenged Paulk's victory, but a subcommittee of the State Democratic Executive Committee of the Alabama Democratic Party ruled in Paulk's favor. Reed appealed the subcommittee's decision, but the Democratic Executive Committee ruled in favor of Paulk. Reed received the nomination of the National Democratic Party of Alabama and defeated Paulk in the general election. Reed and Fred Gray were the first black people elected to the Alabama state legislature since the end of Reconstruction.

During Paulk's tenure in the state house he served on the Agriculture, State Administration, Education, and Constitution and Elections committees. He supported George Wallace during his gubernatorial campaigns.

== Death ==
Paulk died on August 6, 2005.

== Electoral history ==
1962 Alabama House of Representatives Bullock County district Democratic primary
Party	Candidate	Votes	%
Democratic	M.B. McLendon (incumbent)	1,041	56.24%
Democratic	James Paulk	558	30.15%
Democratic	Paul Adams	252	13.61%
Total votes		1,851	100.00%

1962 Alabama House of Representatives Bullock County district Democratic runoff
Party	Candidate	Votes	%
Democratic	James Paulk	1,446	59.85%
Democratic	M.B. McLendon (incumbent)	970	40.15%
Total votes		2,416	100.00%

1970 Alabama House of Representatives 31st district Democratic primary
Party	Candidate	Votes	%
Democratic	James Paulk (incumbent)	8,587	51.50%
Democratic	Thomas Reed	8,088	48.50%
Total votes		16,675	100.00%

1970 Alabama House of Representatives 31st district election
Party	Candidate	Votes	%
NDPA	Thomas Reed	9,436	52.25%
Democratic	James Paulk (incumbent)	8,624	47.75%
Total votes		18,060	100.00%
