= Orzell Billingsley =

American lawyer

- Born: October 24, 1924; Birmingham, Alabama, U.S.
- Died: December 14, 2001 (aged 77); Birmingham, Alabama, U.S.
- Education: Talladega College; Howard University
- Occupation: Lawyer
- Known for: One of the first ten blacks to be admitted to the Alabama State Bar

Orzell Billingsley (October 24, 1924 – December 14, 2001) was one of the first ten African-Americans admitted to the Alabama Bar; he was also known for his work in civil rights litigation, and he was one of the lead lawyers for Martin Luther King Jr. during the 1955 Montgomery bus boycott.

Co-founder of the Alabama Democratic Conference and its first president, Billingsley helped develop this first statewide African-American political organization in Alabama. He was well known for his 15-year defense of Caliph Washington of Bessemer, Alabama, who was falsely accused and convicted of killing a white police officer; it was this case that helped to end all-white juries in Alabama.

== Early life and education ==
Orzell Billingsley was born in Birmingham, Alabama. He had a brother. After attending local schools, he studied at Talladega College and the law school of Howard University. He was among the first ten African-Americans to be admitted to the Alabama bar.

== Career ==
Billingsley set up a practice in Birmingham, where he was long involved in civil rights litigation. He often defended African Americans accused of crimes, and was known for his 15-year long defense of Caliph Washington.

He was arrested for "acting as an agent of a foreign corporation," when he filed a deed on behalf of the Nation of Islam to secure farmland in Alabama.

Presidents John F. Kennedy and Lyndon Johnson were known to call on Billingsley regarding the turbulence during the civil rights era in Alabama. Billingsley served as General Counsel for the National Democratic Party of Alabama (NDPA) and was a delegate for the NDPA at the 1968 Democratic National Convention in Chicago. Billingsley helped to incorporate more than 20 small towns in Alabama that had majority-black populations.

Billingsley was a co-founder of the Alabama Democratic Conference, a statewide organization for African-American politics. He was a founding member of the Alabama Lawyers Association. He challenged the white practice of addressing African Americans by their first names in court, winning them the right to be called by their full proper names and titles during court proceedings. He was known as the "black Patrick Henry of Alabama."
