= Sallie Mae Hadnott =

American civil rights activist (1920–1991)

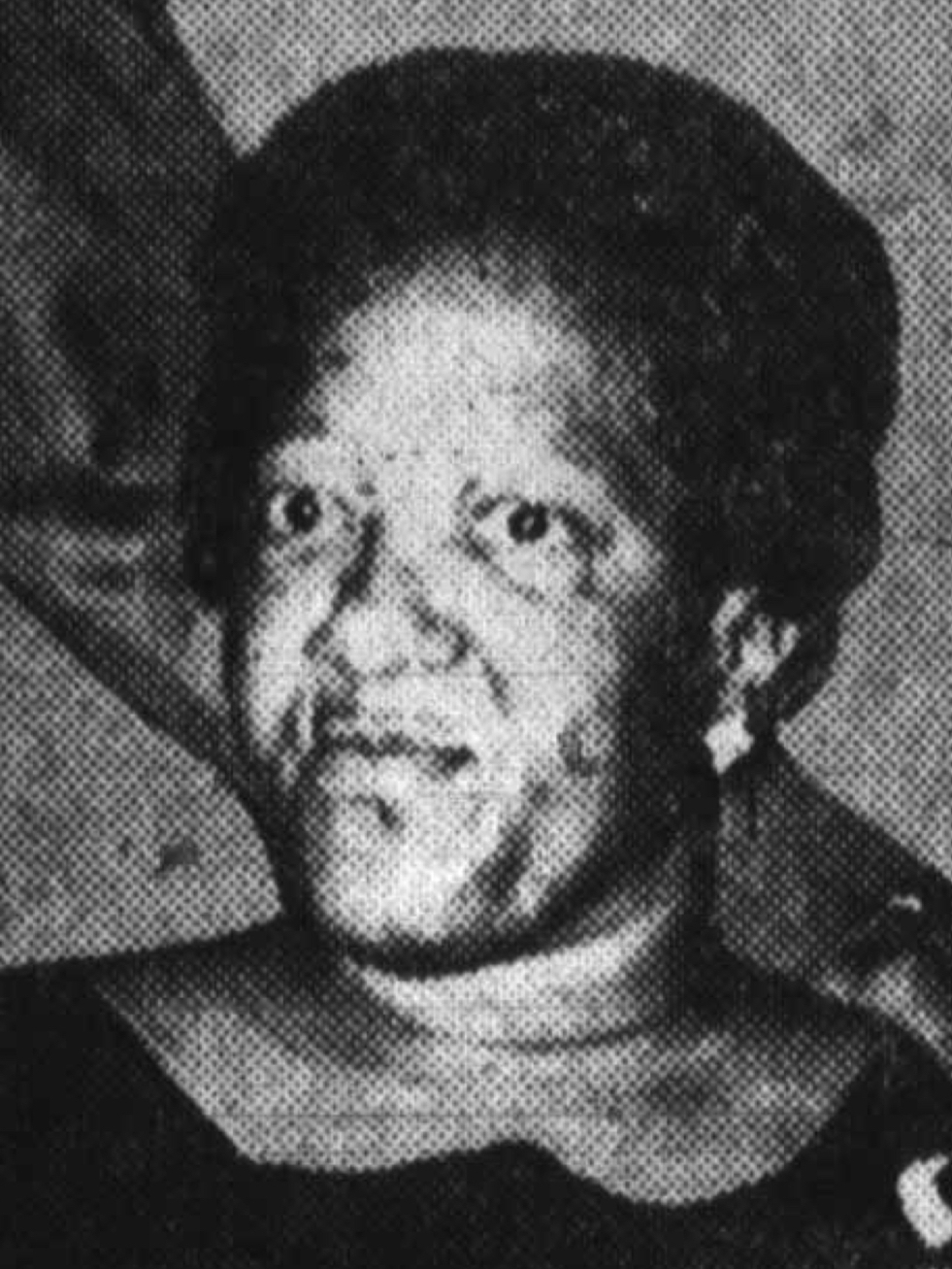
- Hadnott in 1970
- Born: July 3, 1920; Montgomery County, Alabama
- Died: April 20, 1991 (aged 70); Prattville, Alabama
- Political party: National Democratic Party of Alabama
- Spouse: James O. Hadnott
- Children: 8

Sallie Mae Hadnott (July 3, 1920 – April 20, 1991) was an American civil rights activist who worked for the NAACP as the chairman for the branch of the organization in Autauga County.

She was involved in politics, running in the 1970 Alabama Secretary of State election and the 1980 United States Senate election in Alabama for the National Democratic Party of Alabama. She was a plaintiff in the case against Mabel S. Amos, the Secretary of State of Alabama, that allowed the party to receive ballot access.

== Early life and education ==
Hadnott was born on July 3, 1920, in Montgomery County, Alabama. She rarely attended school, as her family was too poor to afford more than basic necessities. In July 1931, her mother died, leaving her to be raised by her aunt. Her aunt sewed clothes for her and her family, usually made out of muslin. For three months out of the year, she attended school. She was often unable to attend more due to the need to pay rent, which she assisted in harvesting cotton for their landlord.

In 1933, her father brought her and the rest of the family to Autauga County, after her father was told by friends that it was a better county for cotton. In Autauga, she attended North Highland School, the only school for black children in the town. She walked seven miles per day to school, and dropped out when she was seventeen years old. In 1940, she moved again to Lake Haven. When she was 18, she left home and married James O. Hadnott, with whom she managed a farm and had eight children.

== Career ==
=== Political career ===
When Hadnott first attempted to register to vote, she was denied three times. Following the passage of the Voting Rights Act of 1965, she worked with the local NAACP to promote voter registration for African Americans. She had a federal examiner fired after she overheard him advising the chairman of the board of registrars of Autauga County to challenge the voter registrations of over 800 newly-registered African Americans, up from 70 to 80 in years past. W.C. Patton of the NAACP Voter Registration Project was with President Lyndon B. Johnson at the time of her call, and was able to handle the issue.

Her first political campaign was for Autauga County Board of Revenue District 1 in 1968 for the National Democratic Party of Alabama (NDPA). She withdrew from the election after absentee ballots were sent out. In 1970, she initially planned to run for Governor of Alabama. She later decided to run for Secretary of State in 1970 as an NDPA candidate. She received 14% of the vote against incumbent Mabel S. Amos. Her final political campaign was in the 1980 United States Senate election in Alabama, where she received less than 1% of the vote for the NDPA.

Hadnott served as the NDPA's chairman for Alabama's 4th congressional district in the early 1970s.

=== Lawsuits ===
In 1973, she sued the Autauga County Board of Education and County Commission for failing to fairly distribute districts, with the largest city of Prattville being underrepresented. The American Civil Liberties Union were permitted to appear for her by justice Frank M. Johnson Jr.. In 1967, she filed a lawsuit against Prattville police, alleging police brutality and racial discrimination.

==== Hadnott v. Amos ====
Hadnott filed a lawsuit against incumbent Secretary of State Mabel Amos following her refusal to grant the NDPA ballot access in the 1968 elections. The NDPA had been denied ballot access due to the party failing to hold mass meetings in various counties to nominate candidates, according to Amos. The lawsuit was financially backed by William Bradford Huie, and was initially delayed to after the Democratic primary.

The case was brought through the United States Court of Appeals for the Fifth Circuit throughout 1968. The Supreme Court of the United States ruled in October 1968 that the names of all candidates should be placed on the general election ballot.

The court ruled 6–2 that the Alabama Corrupt Practices Act was unconstitutional under the Fifteenth Amendment guaranteeing the right to vote, and the First Amendment's right to band together to advance political beliefs.

===== Impact =====
The NDPA candidates were certified for the ballot in the 1968 election, and future elections that they would participate in.

Greene County probate judge Dennis Herndon was convicted on charges of contempt of the US Supreme Court, and he was given a $5,752 fine. Herndon had refused to certify the names of six NDPA candidates on the Greene County ballot.

=== Activism ===
Hadnott participated in the integration of Autauga County High School. She was convinced by one of her daughters, Nitrician, to support her attendance of the newly-integrated school. Her son, James, also joined his sister in registering for the school. She organized an effort for all five black children who were enrolled to enter. She informed the FBI and news outlets of what time they would enter the school. James was expelled from the school within days, and had to serve fourteen days in jail. Hadnott took him to a Southern Christian Leadership Conference meeting in Georgia, where James was able to enter Howard University on his GED scores.

In October 1968, she was invited to testify in front of the U.S. Commission of Education in Washington, D.C. She spoke about her concerns involving the implementation of the laws, when the responsibility of that was put into the hands of segregationists.

On July 14, 1970, then-U.S. Senator Walter Mondale visited her home to listen to various black children who visited and discussed their various experiences with being threatened, beaten, or expelled by superintendents or teachers. Few people knew of the visit at the time, only the schoolchildren who attended. The reasoning she gave for the quiet nature of the meeting was her fear of the Ku Klux Klan endangering his life. Mondale's presence was criticized by a local Prattville newspaper. Ahead of the 1976 United States presidential election, Hadnott spoke of his visit to her house following his selection as the vice-presidential nominee for the Democratic Party. She described him as "very open-minded" and that he "couldn't be no worse than anybody else."

Hadnott also served as the chairman of the NAACP branch in Autauga County during the 1970s.

== Personal life and death ==
Hadnott lived in Prattville with her husband James until her death on April 20, 1991 at the age of 70.

== Legacy ==
Hadnott was recognized as a civil rights leader in both Prattville and Autauga County, and her home street had its name changed in 2021 by the City of Prattville. She was also honored in a 2025 event that was hosted by Central Alabama Community College.
