= Alabama Democratic Conference =

- Chairman: Joe L. Reed
- Founded: 1960
- Headquarters: 424 S. Decatur Street, Montgomery, Alabama
- Ideology: African-American civil rights, Democratic Party advocacy
- National affiliation: Democratic Party (United States)

Website
- theadc.org

The Alabama Democratic Conference (ADC) is an African-American political league, co-founded by Orzell Billingsley and others, in cooperation with the national Democratic Party. Formed in 1960 as the Black Political Caucus of Alabama, it was the first statewide political organization in Alabama for African Americans, and was designed in an effort to bring newly registered blacks into the Democratic ranks.

The organization was co-founded by civil rights attorney Arthur Shores, activist Rufus Lewis, Tuskegee teacher C.G. Gomillion, salesman Q. D. Adams, dockworkers' union leader Isom Clemon, Tuskegee teacher Beulah Johnson and attorney Orzell Billingsley in order to support John F. Kennedy's bid for the Democratic nomination for president.

Given the resistance of many white conservative Democrats to civil rights goals and participation of African Americans in the state party, many of the ADC activists, such as John L. Cashin, Jr., later left the Alabama Democratic Party. They formed the National Democratic Party of Alabama in 1968, which was modeled after the Mississippi Freedom Democratic Party, and ran Cashin for governor against George Wallace in 1970. It was designed to enable African Americans to participate in local and state politics, and to develop and elect their own candidates for office.

The ADC continues to make endorsements in statewide races and has many county chapters. Dr. Joe L. Reed, the former associate executive secretary of the Alabama Education Association, has served as chair of the ADC since 1979.
