= 1970 Alabama Secretary of State election =

- November 3, 1970
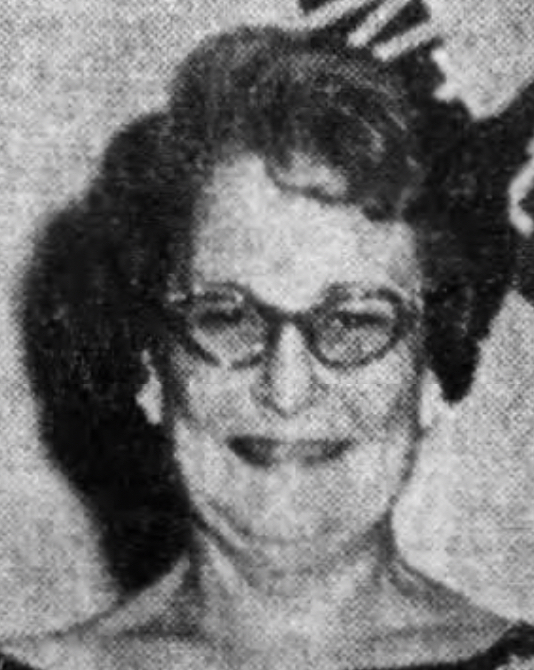

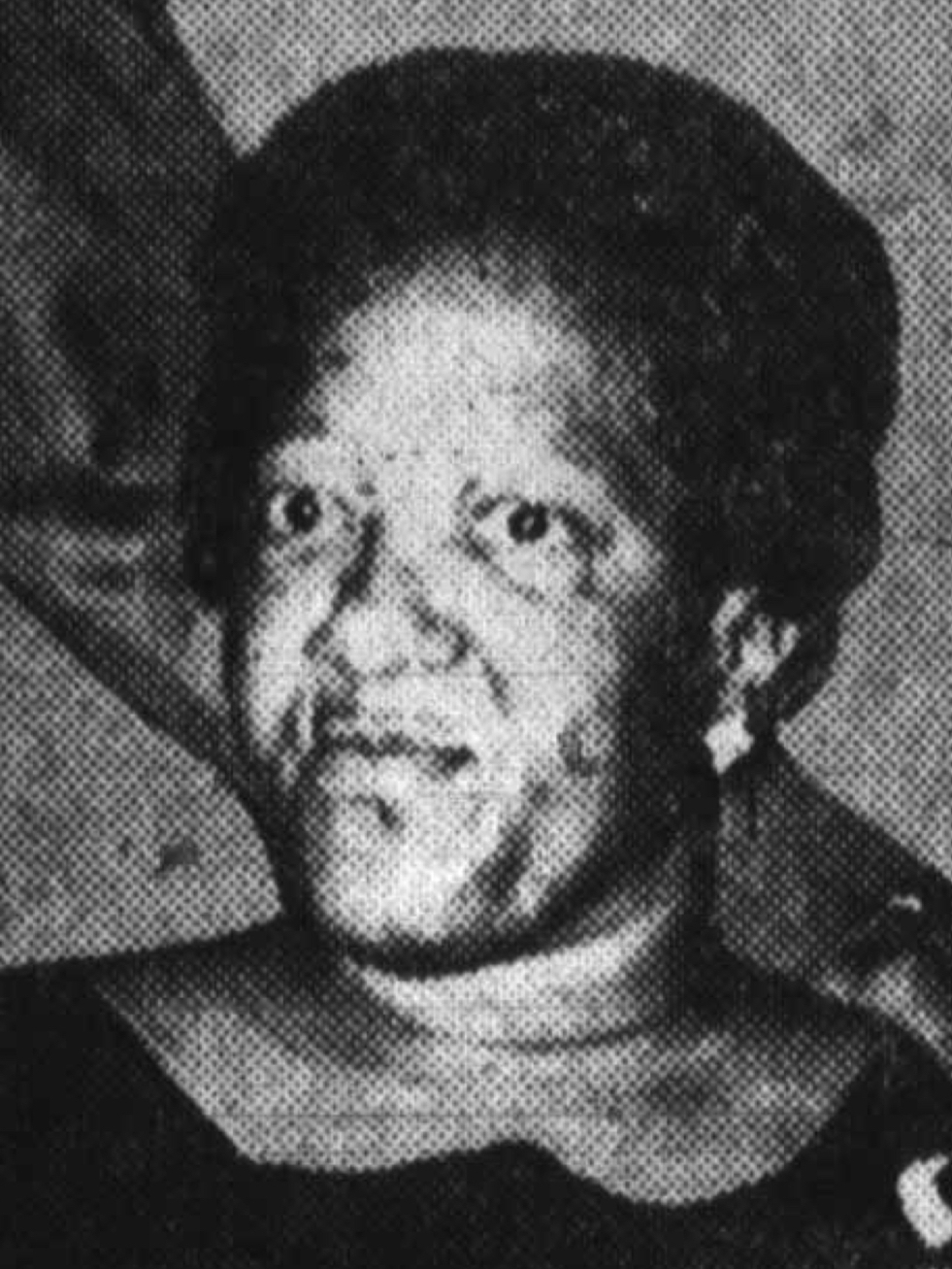
Candidate	Mabel S. Amos	Sally M. Hadnott
Party	Democratic	NDPA
Popular vote	601,211	100,526
Percentage	86.67%	13.33%
- County results Amos: 50–60% 60–70% 70–80% 80–90% >90% Hadnott: 50–60%
Secretary of State before election
Mabel S. Amos
Democratic
Elected Secretary of State
Mabel S. Amos
Democratic

The 1970 Alabama Secretary of State election was held on November 3, 1970, to elect the Secretary of State of Alabama to a four-year term.

== Democratic primary ==
=== Candidates ===
==== Nominee ====
- Mabel S. Amos, incumbent Secretary of State

== National Democratic Party of Alabama ==
=== Candidates ===
==== Nominee ====
- Sally M. Hadnott, civil rights activist

== General election ==
=== Results ===
1970 Alabama Secretary of State election
Party	Candidate	Votes	%
Democratic	Mabel S. Amos	601,211	86.67%
NDPA	Sally M. Hadnott	100,526	13.33%
Total votes		701,737	100.00
