= Thomas Reed (Alabama politician) =

Alabama civil rights leader and politician

- Thomas Reed campaigning in 1966

Member of the Alabama House of Representatives
- In office November 9, 1970 – November 18, 1988
- Preceded by: James Paulk (31st)
- Succeeded by: George Clay (82nd)
- In office 1995 – October 27, 1997
- Preceded by: George Clay (82nd)
- Succeeded by: Johnny Ford (82nd)
- Constituency: 31st district (1970-1975); 67th district (1975-1983); 82nd district (1983-1988; 1995-1997)

Personal details
- Born: 1927 Brookhaven, Mississippi, U.S.
- Died: October 27, 1997 (aged 69–70)
- Party: National Democratic; Democratic
- Spouse: Seretta
- Children: 3
- Education: Tuskegee Institute

Thomas J. Reed Sr. (1927 − October 27, 1997) was an American civil rights activist, restaurateur, and politician who served in the Alabama House of Representatives from 1970 to 1988, and 1995 to 1997, as a member of the Democratic Party. He served as president of the Alabama NAACP from 1969 to 1979, and 1985 to 1989.

Reed was born in Brookhaven, Mississippi, and educated at the Tuskegee Institute. He unsuccessfully ran for mayor of Tuskegee in 1968, before being elected president of the Alabama NAACP, which he would hold almost continuously until 1989. State Representative James Paulk defeated Reed for the Democratic nomination in 1964 and 1970, but Reed won the 1970 election with the nomination of the National Democratic Party of Alabama. He and Fred D. Gray Sr. were the first two African Americans elected to Alabama's legislature in the 20th century.

During Reed's tenure in the state legislature he chaired the Public Welfare committee and unsuccessfully ran for speaker pro tem. He served as a delegate to multiple Democratic National Conventions between 1972 and 1988. Reed led an unsuccessful attempt, where he and 13 other legislators were arrested, to remove the Confederate Flag from above the Alabama State Capitol.

In 1977, Reed was convicted for attempting to bribe T. Dudley Perry and removed from office, but his conviction and removal were reversed. He was convicted in 1988 for violating the Hobbs Act and Travel Act to aid in the parole of Anthony Dennis Chesser and served a sentence from December 1989 to April 1991, and was on parole until October 1993. Reed returned to the state legislature in the 1994 election and died in office.

== Early life ==
Thomas Reed was born in Brookhaven, Mississippi, in 1927. He graduated from Tuskegee Institute with Bachelor of Science and Master of Science degrees in economics. Reed worked as a teacher at Tuskegee Institute. Reed operated two restaurants, Thomas Reed's Chick Coops, in Tuskegee. He married Seretta, with whom he had three children.

== Career ==
=== Early politics ===
Representative James Paulk defeated Reed for the Democratic nomination for the 31st district in the 1964 election. Reed ran for mayor of Tuskegee, Alabama, in 1968, but lost to Mayor Charles Keever. He became president of the Alabama NAACP in 1969. He was reelected as president multiple times, including in a special election after the national organization invalidated the 1978 election, but lost to Charles Woods in 1979.

=== State legislature ===
==== Elections ====
Paulk defeated Reed in the Democratic primary during the 1970 election. Reed challenged Paulk's victory, but a subcommittee of the State Democratic Executive Committee of the Alabama Democratic Party ruled in Paulk's favor. Reed appealed the subcommittee's decision, but the Democratic Executive Committee ruled in favor of Paulk. Reed received the nomination of the National Democratic Party of Alabama and defeated Paulk in the general election. Reed and Fred Gray were the first black people elected to the Alabama state legislature since the end of Reconstruction. Reed was sworn in prior to Gray, technically making him the first. Governor George Wallace lived within Reed's district.

Reed announced that his campaign for the 1974 election on December 19, 1972. He and Gray were redistricted into the 67th district and Reed defeated Gray in the Democratic primary. The NDPA gave its nomination to Reed, but he declined it as he could only run with one party's nomination. He won in the general election without opposition.

John Allie James, Charles Arrington, and Mable Freeman challenged Reed's candidacy in the 1978 election based on his 1977 bribery conviction, but the Alabama Democratic Executive Committee declined to remove him from the ballot. Reed won reelection. During the 1982 election Reed defeated George Clay in the Democratic primary and faced no opposition in the general election. A special election in 1983 for the entire state legislature was ordered by a federal court and Reed won in the 82nd district without opposition. Reed defeated M.H. Bronson in the 1986 Democratic primary and won in the general election without opposition.

Following Reed's conviction and removal from the state house Hunt called for a special election to fill his seat, alongside two other seats, to be held on March 14, 1989. Democratic nominee George Clay defeated Republican nominee Randolph Hall in the special election.

After leaving prison Reed announced that he would run for state house in the 1994 election. He was pardoned by the Alabama Board of Pardons and Paroles on March 7, 1994, which allowed him to run for office. He announced his campaign on March 21, and placed first in the Democratic primary before defeating John McGowan in the runoff. He faced no opposition in the election.

==== Tenure ====
Reed lost the position of speaker pro tem to Rick Manley in 1979, and to Roy Johnson in 1983. During his tenure in the state house he served on the Tourism, Entertainment and Sports, Navigation and Water Ways, and Rules committees. He served as co-chair of the Joint Prison Committee. Governor Fob James appointed Reed to the Tuskegee Institute Board of Commissioners in 1980, and served until his replacement by Demetrius Newton 1988. In 1987, he joined protests over the lack of black representation in state house committee chair positions.

Reed's service as chair of the Public Welfare committee, starting in 1975, made him the first black person to lead a committee in the Alabama legislature since Reconstruction. Reed employed the first black legislative page in Alabama since 1878. Reed opposed Elizabeth B. Andrews' candidacy to fill the vacancy in the United States House of Representatives caused by George W. Andrews's, her husband, death.

In 1970, J.J. Jaxon, chair of the Democratic executive committee, attempted to remove Reed from the committee due to him joining the NDPA, but was delayed until the committee's next meeting in January 1972. Reed was a member of Alabamians for Democracy which called for Charles Graddick to run a write-in campaign during the 1986 gubernatorial election.

Reed ran to serve as a delegate to the 1972 Democratic National Convention from the 22nd district. Dan C. Alexander Jr., a delegate candidate who survived a credentials challenge based on his support for Wallace's 1968 third-party presidential campaign, challenged his qualification to run as a delegate citing Reed running as the NDPA candidate in 1970. Reed won as an uncommitted delegate against Wallace delegate W.O. Braham and gave his support to George McGovern. Reed defeated state senator T. Dudley Perry, a Wallace delegate, in a runoff to serve as an uncommitted delegate from the 21st district to the 1976 Democratic National Convention. Reed later supported Carter and proposed a resolution, which was passed by the state house, congratulating him after receiving enough delegates to win the nomination. He was elected as a delegate for Ted Kennedy to the 1980 Democratic National Convention from the 3rd district, supported Walter Mondale for the Democratic nomination during the 1984 presidential election, and was a delegate for Jesse Jackson from the 3rd district during the 1988 primary.

During a speech on Martin Luther King Jr. Day in 1988, Reed stated that God paralyzed Wallace as a punishment for his racism. Reed later apologized to Wallace and his family which Wallace and his son accepted.

== Legal issues ==
In 1976, Reed was accused of attempting to bribe Perry to vote in favor of legislation to establish a dog racing track in Macon County. Perry was offered a $20,000-50,000 salary to serve as the lawyer for Ronald Williams, who was to be on the racing commission. Reed and Williams were indicted on September 17. Perry stated that "I was completely convinced they would kill me if I didn't do what they wanted" and recorded his conversations with Reed for the Federal Bureau of Investigation. The prosecution accused Reed of having taken $25,000 from five men seeking to benefit from dog racing, but Reed claimed it was a loan. The trial ended in a mistrial with all of the jurors except for one supporting a guilty conviction and a second trial also ended in a mistrial. Williams was convicted on May 20, 1977. Reed compared a third trial to a "legal lynching" and accused Perry of demanding a $100,000 bribe from him. Reed was convicted on July 22, and fined $500.

Attorney General Bill Baxley ruled that he was removed from the state legislature, but Reed refused to vacate his seat and Wallace declined to call a special election. James filed a lawsuit to have Reed removed from the legislature, but Judge Joseph Phelps dismissed the lawsuit. Phelps later ruled that Reed was ineligible to hold office and invalidated his victory in the 1978 election and the Alabama Court of Criminal Appeals upheld his 1977 conviction. The Supreme Court of Alabama allowed him to stay in the legislature during his appeal on the condition that he post a $10,000 bond and repay legislative expenses if he lost. On May 25, 1979, the Supreme Court unanimously reversed Reed's conviction and stated that as he was convicted of a misdemeanor, rather than a felony, he was allowed to hold office. Reed was given $19,695.66 with 6% interest in back pay. Reed sought $59,500 in damages in order to repay the legal fees that originated from Baxley's prosecution and the Alabama Board of Adjustment gave him $11,855 in 1981.

Reed was given a $24.612.94 loan by the National Bank and Trust Company in 1979, but did not repay it. A judgement was issued against him giving the bank $28,275, but had not paid it by 1988. He was given a citation and fined $185 in 1987, for operating two restaurants without a license. By 1988, Reed had $2,364 in back sales taxes in Macon County and multiple unpaid judgements.

=== Conviction ===
Anthony Dennis Chesser was convicted in 1984, for murdering his wife. He sentenced to forty years in prison and would be up for parole in 1994. On August 5, 1986, Reed was able to move the parole consideration ahead to 1989, but this was undone on August 8. Freddie Smith, a prison commissioner who died in 1987, contacted the FBI about Reed. The FBI investigated Reed for allegedly accepting $10,000 from May 1 to September 30, 1986, from Bobby Gene Chesser to aid Chesser in getting paroled earlier. The FBI stated that Bobby asked Reed to give the money back, but only repaid $8,000 of the bribe. Reed denied the allegations and stating that it was "illegal harassment by the FBI". He stated that the FBI was targeting him for attempting to remove the Confederate flag, but the FBI denied this.

Reed was charged under the Hobbs Act and paid a bond of $10,000 on May 25, 1988. Bobby was not charged and stated that he did pay Reed $10,000, but that it was not a bribe. Reed was indicted on June 16, for accepting $10,000 in cash and between $5−10,000 in restaurant equipment from the Chesser family. He was charged by the federal indictment for two counts of violating the Hobbs Act and three counts of violating the Travel Act. He was indicted on two counts by a state-level grand jury on June 20, and released on a $5,000 bond.

Reed pled not guilty to the state and federal charges and Baxley, now in private practice, was his lawyer. A 27-minute tape recording of a discussion between Reed and Bobby made on August 28, 1986, was admitted as evidence. On September 30, Reed was found guilty in the federal case on one count of extortion and one county of inducing Bobby to cross state lines to participate in an illegal activity. Reed refused to resign from the state house and Judge Charles Price ruled that he could retain his seat until sentencing. The state supreme court unanimously voted to not issue a ruling. Legislation was later passed that required public officials convicted of a felony to immediately leave office. He was sentenced to four years in prison and removed from office on November 18.

Reed was initially meant to go to prison on January 3, 1989, but was delayed while the case was on appeal. The 11th U.S. Circuit Court of Appeals unanimously rejected Reed's appeal on September 29. He started his sentence at a federal prison in Pensacola, Florida, on December 6. He appealed to the Supreme Court of the United States, but the court declined to hear the case. Reed was paroled on April 4, 1991, and spent the remainder of his term in a halfway house. He completed his parole in October 1993.

Reed stated that he would not resign as president of the state NAACP. Earl Shinhoster, the Southeast regional director of the NAACP, stated that Reed's legal troubles hurt the NAACP. Benjamin Hooks, the executive director of the NAACP, asked for Reed to resign. Reed was reelected as president in 1989, despite his conviction and was the first person convicted of a felony elected as an NAACP affiliate president. Reed resigned after starting his prison sentence. Lillian Jackson was selected to replace him on June 2, 1990.

== Death ==
Reed remained in the state legislature despite having an illness that required him to seek treatment at the Mayo Clinic. He declined to say what illness he was suffering from and died on October 27, 1997. The coroner later reported that Reed died from cancer. He was described by Gray as "a trailblazer... (h)e did an excellent job of representing not only his constituents, but all people", and by Alabama House Speaker James S. Clark as a "pioneer of the civil rights movement".

Sereetta was appointed to replace Reed on the Tuskegee Institute Board of Commissioners. Johnny Ford announced his campaign for Reed's seat before his death and a special election was called following Reed's death. Sereetta ran in the special election, but lost the Democratic primary runoff to Ford, who defeated Republican nominee Robert Story and Libertarian nominee John Sophocleus.

== Political positions ==
Reed proposed legislation to prohibit capital punishment. He proposed legislation that would prevent the imprisonment of pregnant women. Reed opposed legislation that criminalized marital rape stating that "If this were a real issue involving women around this state you wouldn't have standing room in this balcony".

Reed supported lowering the voting age to eighteen. He was endorsed by the AFL–CIO while running to be a delegate to the 1976 DNC. He obtain $3 million in state funding for a museum about the Tuskegee airmen.

=== Confederate flag ===
In December 1987, Reed called for the removal of the Confederate flag from the Alabama State Capitol stating that the flag was "obnoxious to me and to all black people" and that if Governor H. Guy Hunt did not remove the flag then he would "physically remove it myself". The flag had been displayed since the centennial celebration of the Civil War in 1961. Shinhoster called for attempts to remove the Confederate flag from the capitol buildings of multiple southern state, but the Alabama NAACP declined to support Reed's protest.

Reed and Hunt met to discuss a compromise, but Hunt rejected an offer by Reed to have the battle flag taken down and replaced by official flag of the Confederacy, placing the flag at a Civil War memorial, or temporarily taking down the flag while an advisory committee determines its future. On February 2, Reed attempted to climb the capitol building with fellow legislators Alvin Holmes, Henry Sanders, and Fred Horn accompanying him, but was arrested. John M. Patterson, who was governor when the flag was raised over the capitol, supported removing the flag and received praise from Reed.

Reed was one of fourteen black legislators arrested on the day alongside Holmes, Horn, Sanders, James Buskey, John Buskey, Pat Davis, George Perdue, John Rogers, Lewis Spratt, James L. Thomas, Bryant Melton, Earl Hilliard Sr., and Michael Figures. Reed and the other legislators were prosecuted for trespassing and unsuccessfully claimed immunity as elected officials. They were convicted on January 10, 1989, and given a $100 fine plus court costs.

=== Racial equality ===
Reed and Gray proposed to have the next 100 hired employees of the Alabama Highway Patrol be black and eventually reduced the amount to 10, but all of their attempts failed. In 1972, the NAACP and Reed filed a lawsuit to force the integration of the Highway Patrol. This resulted in black people making up one-fourth of the patrol. Reed criticized the patrol for not having any black officers of lieutenant, captain, or major rank in 1987. He proposed the creation of a seven-member Fair Employment Practices Commission in 1987.

== Electoral history ==
1970 Alabama House of Representatives 31st district election
Primary election
Party	Candidate	Votes	%
Democratic	James Paulk (incumbent)	8,587	51.50%
Democratic	Thomas Reed	8,088	48.50%
Total votes		16,675	100.00%
General election
NDPA	Thomas Reed	9,436	52.25%
Democratic	James Paulk (incumbent)	8,624	47.75%
Total votes		18,060	100.00%

1974 Alabama House of Representatives 67th district Democratic primary
Party	Candidate	Votes	%
Democratic	Thomas Reed (incumbent)	5,889	60.98%
Democratic	Fred Gray (incumbent)	3,769	39.02%
Total votes		9,658	100.00%

1982 Alabama House of Representatives 67th district election
Primary election
Party	Candidate	Votes	%
Democratic	Thomas Reed (incumbent)	7,253	63.80%
Democratic	George Clay	4,115	36.20%
Total votes		11,368	100.00%
General election
Democratic	Thomas Reed (incumbent)	9,022	100.00%
Total votes		9,022	100.00%

1983 Alabama House of Representatives 82nd district election
Party	Candidate	Votes	%
Democratic	Thomas Reed (incumbent)	4,746	100.00%
Total votes		4,746	100.00%

1986 Alabama House of Representatives 82nd district election
Primary election
Party	Candidate	Votes	%
Democratic	Thomas Reed (incumbent)	6,992	72.38%
Democratic	M.H. Bronson	2,668	27.62%
Total votes		9,660	100.00%
General election
Democratic	Thomas Reed (incumbent)	9,660	100.00%
Total votes		9,660	100.00%

1994 Alabama House of Representatives 82nd district Democratic primary
Party	Candidate	Votes	%
Democratic	Thomas Reed	4,863	49.27%
Democratic	John McGowan	2,716	26.96%
Democratic	Omar Neal	2,494	24.76%
Total votes		10,073	100.00%

1994 Alabama House of Representatives 82nd district Democratic primary runoff
Party	Candidate	Votes	%
Democratic	Thomas Reed	5,786	64.42%
Democratic	John McGowan	3,196	35.58%
Total votes		8,982	100.00%

1994 Alabama House of Representatives 82nd district election
Party	Candidate	Votes	%
Democratic	Thomas Reed (incumbent)	7,716	99.82%
Write-in		14	0.18%
Total votes		7,730	100.00%
