= 1970 Alabama State Auditor election =

- November 3, 1970
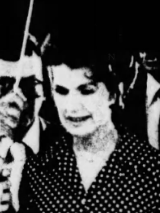

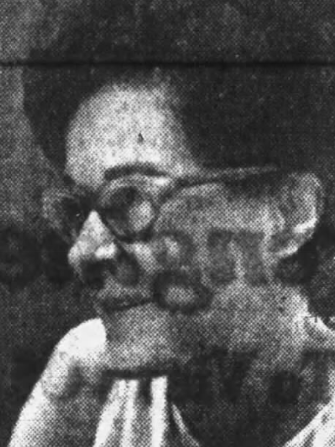
Candidate	Melba Till Allen	Mary Pandow
Party	Democratic	NDPA
Popular vote	614,371	102,015
Percentage	83.1%	13.8%
State Auditor before election
Melba Till Allen
Democratic
Elected State Auditor
Melba Till Allen
Democratic

The 1970 Alabama State Auditor election was held on November 3, 1970, to elect the State Auditor of Alabama to a four-year term. The primary election was held on May 5, 1970.

== Democratic primary ==
=== Candidates ===
==== Nominee ====
- Melba Till Allen, incumbent auditor

==== Eliminated in primary ====
- Bill Frith, public accountant

=== Results ===
Democratic primary
Party	Candidate	Votes	%
Democratic	Melba Till Allen (incumbent)	664,832	84.81
Democratic	W.B. (Bill) Frith	119,061	15.19
Total votes		783,893	100.00

== Third-party and independent candidates ==
=== New Democratic Party of Alabama ===
==== Nominee ====
- Mary Pandow, chemist and civil rights activist

=== Prohibition Party ===
==== Nominee ====
- Daisy Williams

== General election ==
=== Results ===
1970 Alabama State Auditor election
Party	Candidate	Votes	%
Democratic	Melba Till Allen (incumbent)	614,371	83.09
NDPA	Mary Pandow	102,015	13.80
Prohibition	Daisy Williams	23,024	3.11
Total votes		739,410	100.00
