= Herschel V. Cashin =

American politician

Herschel Vivian Cashin was an American lawyer, state legislator, and public official in the United States.

He was born in the state in Georgia to a white Irish father and a free "mulatto" woman. He was educated in Philadelphia by Octavius Catto at the Institute for Colored Youth, but returned to the south to serve in the Alabama House of Representatives during the Reconstruction era. Charles Spencer Smith, his colleague in the Alabama House, described him as a friend.

Theodore Roosevelt nominated him to be Receiver of Public Monies in Huntsville, Alabama. He was the lead author of Under Fire With the Tenth Cavalry about "the Negro's Participation in Wars of the United States" and the Spanish-American War in particular.

Several of his descendants were active in civil rights advocacy including grandson John L. Cashin Jr. And great-granddaughter Sheryll Cashin.
