= William Hooper Councill =

American slave (1848–1909)

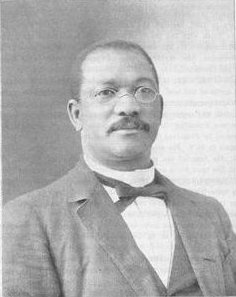
- Born: July 12, 1848; Fayetteville, North Carolina
- Died: April 9, 1909 (aged 60)
- Burial place: Alabama Agricultural and Mechanical University
- Occupation: Educator

William Hooper Councill (July 12, 1848 – April 9, 1909) was an American former slave and the first president of Huntsville Normal School, which is today Alabama Agricultural and Mechanical University in Normal, Alabama.

== Life ==
He was born a slave in Fayetteville, North Carolina, on July 12, 1848, to William and Mary Jane Councill. His father escaped to Canada in 1854 and made several unsuccessful attempts to free his family. The young William Hooper Councill was taken to Huntsville, Alabama by slave traders in 1857. He and his mother and brothers were sold from the auction block at Green Bottom Inn to Judge David Campbell Humphreys. At this auction, he saw two of his brothers sold in 1857 and never heard from them again.

During the American Civil War, he and his remaining brothers were taken into rural areas to keep them from the Union Army, but before the end of the war, they escaped to Union lines. They attended, on a part-time basis, the Freedmen's Bureau school opened by northerners in Stevenson, Alabama in 1865, where Councill remained until 1867 when he began teaching. He was the first person to teach a school for black students outside of a city in northern Alabama – a position that drew opposition from the Ku Klux Klan. Councill helped start the Lincoln School, four miles west of Huntsville, in 1868. It had 36 students by 1870.

During Reconstruction after the American Civil War, he served as assistant enrollment clerk in the Alabama legislature in 1872 and 1874 and was a secretary of the Colored National Civil Rights Convention in Washington, D.C. in 1873. He taught at Morris Brown College in Atlanta, Georgia and edited a newspaper, the Negro Watchman in 1874 in Huntsville.

Councill used his connections in the Democratic Party and state legislature to gain approval for his plan for the State Normal School for Negroes in 1875, becoming its principal and, later, president. He was appointed notary public by Governor Rufus W. Cobb in 1882. In 1883, he was admitted to practice before the Supreme Court of Alabama.

In 1884, he married Maria H. Wheeden from Huntsville.

As a contemporary of Booker T. Washington, he and Washington (who headed the Tuskegee Institute) often competed for favors and funds from the Alabama Legislature and northern philanthropists.

In 1887, Councill attracted wide attention when he complained to the Interstate Commerce Commission of harsh treatment on the Alabama railroad. That action later prompted his superiors to relieve him of his duties as president of AAMU for one year. That experience may have helped alter his position on the proper role for a Black man to play in the Southern United States during that era because afterward, he advocated accommodation and acceptance of his "unctuous sycophancy", which prompted Washington to characterize him as "simply toadying to White people." He served at AAMU until 1909, although Solomon T. Clanton served as acting president in 1903 when Councill was ill. Under his leadership, AAMU was second only to Tuskegee Institute in size among Alabama Negro industrial schools.

Councill compiled the illustrated cultural history book Lamp of Wisdom; or Race History Illustrated in 1898. It was published by J. T. Haley of Nashville.

Councill died on April 9, 1909, following a long illness. He was buried on the campus of AAMU, where he had served as president for 32 years.

Councill is celebrated every May at AAMU on Founder's Day, which includes events honoring his contributions to the university and African American education.

== Legacy ==
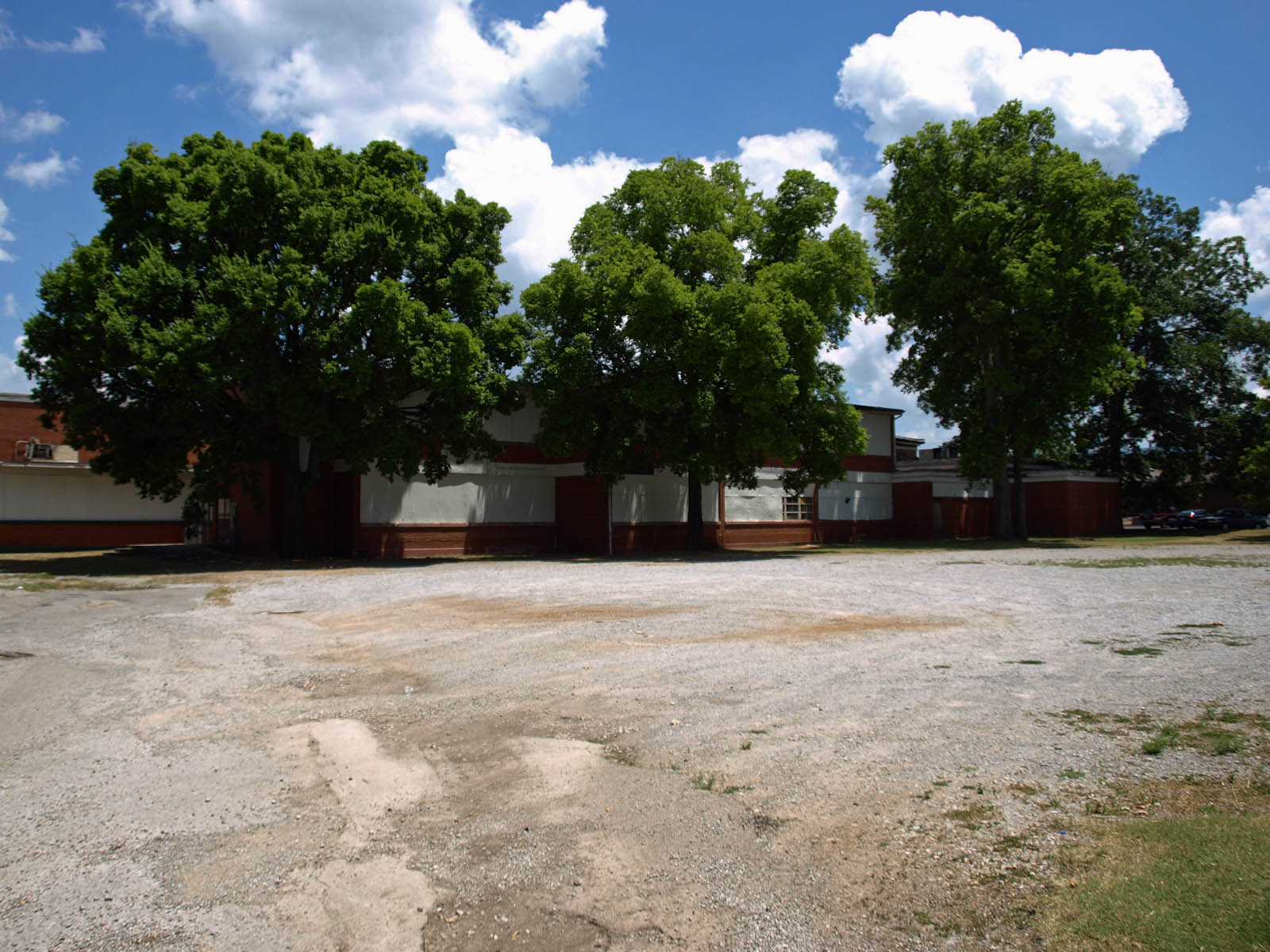
W. H. Councill High School building in Huntsville, 2010

The first public school for African Americans in Huntsville was named William Hooper Councill High School in Councill's honor. It began as Councill Training School in 1867. Civil rights leader Joseph Lowery is one of its alumni. The school closed during integration, with the last class graduating in 1966. The high school building is listed on the Alabama Register of Landmarks and Heritage.

In 2018, the William Hooper Councill Alumni Association broke ground on the William Hooper Councill High School Memorial Park at the school's original site. The design mirrors the original floor plan of the school, with paths and benches incorporating bricks from the last school building that had remained on site. Initial work on the park began in 2019, and city officials have announced that in the future the park will feature sculptures of Councill as well as students from Councill High School.

In 2020, AAMU announced the construction of the William Hooper Councill Eternal Flame Memorial, described as "a lasting tribute to the visionary founder of AAMU and his enduring fight for education that has positively impacted the United States and beyond." The Memorial will include a new structure erected at the current gravesite, with the eternal flame set in the center of a walkway.

== Bibliography ==
- Councill, William H. Negro Laborer: A Word to Him. 1887.
- Councill, W H. Lamp of Wisdom; Or, Race History Illuminated. Nashville, Tenn: Haley, 1898.
- Councill, William Hooper. "Future of the Negro." Forum (New York, N.Y.: 1886), vol. 27, July 1899, pp. 570–577.

== See also ==
- List of African-American officeholders during Reconstruction
