= Marion Blackburn =

American businessman (1939–2025)

Personal information
- Nationality: American
- Born: Marion Ossie Blackburn; July 31, 1939 Huntsville, Alabama, U.S.
- Died: April 4, 2025 (aged 86) Portland, Oregon, U.S.
- Education: Alabama A&M College
- Spouse: Kay Francis Kellam (m. 1961)
- Children: 3

Sport
- Sport: Tennis
- League: USTA Pacific Northwest

Marion Ossie Blackburn (July 31, 1939 – April 4, 2025) was an American entrepreneur and tennis professional.

== Early life and education ==
Marion Blackburn was born on July 31, 1939, in Huntsville, Alabama. Due to segregation, he was not able to play tennis on either of the two courts in town as a child because he was African American.

He attended William Hooper Councill High School and Alabama A&M College, where he played on what he described as a “ragtag tennis team.”

== Business career ==
In the early 1960s, Blackburn moved to Portland, Oregon, where opened a wood manufacturing business called Wood Arts. He then opened a tennis teaching business called "Tennis Lessons Inc." Initially operating out of a warehouse with low ceilings and concrete floors in the John’s Landing neighborhood, Blackburn soon started a full-fledged tennis club. With a loan from the federal government, he built a tennis club from scratch on the 5800 block of the Beaverton-Hillsdale Highway. The initial name of the club, which opened in 1977, was Tennis Town. After adding on additional facilities such as a weightlifting room, aerobics studio, racquetball courts, outdoor tennis courts, and pool, Blackburn renamed his club Raleigh Hills Racquet and Health Club. He later changed it to Portland Athletic Club, or "PAC." Blackburn's goal was to provide a tennis club where anyone could play, regardless of skin color.

In a colorful profile of Blackburn written by sportswriter and baseball executive Harold Parrott, Blackburn hinted at the slim margins but rich rewards of owning and operating a tennis facility. "There's no money in this business," Blackburn explained. "I mean, I couldn't turn all this into cash, even if I wanted to. All I've done is bought myself a job. It's a steady job, and you've got to work at it to stay afloat."

Blackburn claimed to be the only single-person owner-operator of a Black-owned tennis club in the United States who also owned the land beneath the facility. No other examples of single-owner, Black-owned tennis clubs currently exist in the Pacific Northwest.

== Tennis career ==
During his time in the U.S. Army, Blackburn learned to play tennis at a high level. Back in Portland in the 1960s, Blackburn played tennis regularly at Irving Park. He was initially denied membership to the Irvington Club. Following the protests of Irvington Club pro Jack Neer, Blackburn and his family were admitted.

During the 1970s and 1980s, Blackburn was a competitive tournament player, with a ranking in the USTA Pacific Northwest region’s 35+ category. He won the Oregon State men’s 35+ tournament numerous times.

== Coaching and writing ==
Blackburn self-published a tennis teaching book, The Best Tennis Lesson You Ever Had, in 1988. It contains a stroke-by-stroke breakdown of the game, along with discussions of his teaching philosophy.

== Personal life ==
Blackburn was married to Kay Francis Kellam from 1961 to 1977. Together they had three children: Anthony Wayne Blackburn, Nikki Renae Blackburn-Orr, and Ramon Blackburn, all of whom learned to play tennis at a high level.

== Illness and death ==
Blackburn was diagnosed with dementia and Parkinson’s disease in 2022. He died at home on April 4, 2025, surrounded by family members.
