= 1980 United States Senate election in Alabama =

- November 4, 1980
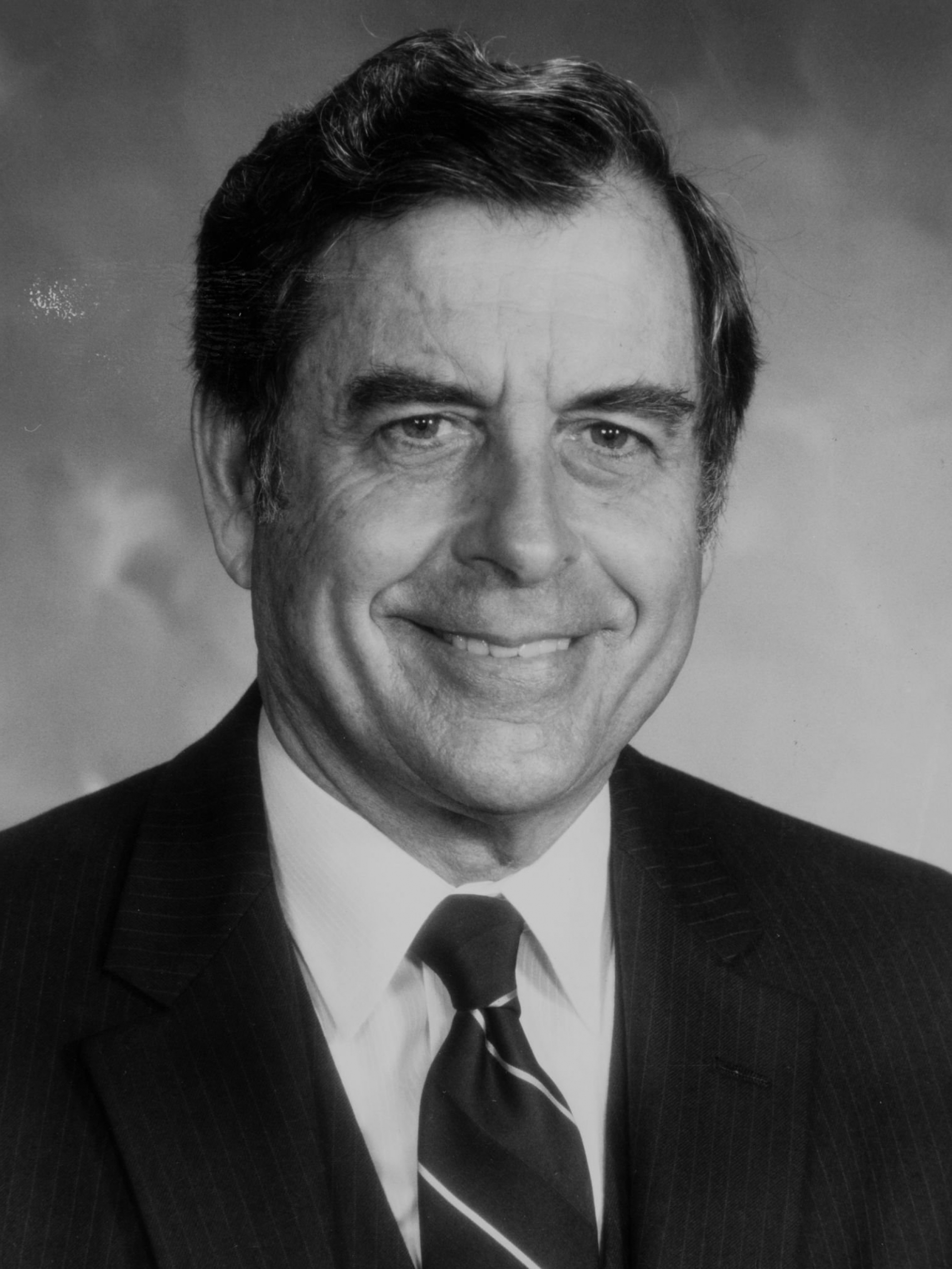

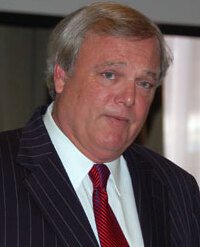
Nominee	Jeremiah Denton	Jim Folsom Jr.
Party	Republican	Democratic
Popular vote	650,363	610,175
Percentage	50.15%	47.05%
- County results Denton: 40–50% 50–60% 60–70% Folsom: 40–50% 50–60% 60–70% 70–80% 80–90%
U.S. senator before election
Donald Stewart
Democratic
Elected U.S. Senator
Jeremiah Denton
Republican

The 1980 United States Senate election in Alabama took place on November 4, 1980, alongside other elections to the United States Senate in other states as well as elections to the United States House of Representatives and various state and local elections. Incumbent Democratic U.S. Senator Donald Stewart, elected in a special election to finish the term of the seat left vacant by the death of Senator James B. Allen, decided to run for a full term, but was defeated in the primary by Jim Folsom, who lost the general election to Republican Jeremiah Denton.

Denton was the first Republican elected to the Senate from Alabama since the end of Reconstruction in 1879 and the first Republican elected since the passage of the 17th Amendment requiring the direct election of senators. He would lose reelection in 1986 to Democratic nominee Richard Shelby, who later joined the Republican Party in 1994.

== Democratic primary ==
=== Candidates ===
- Jim Folsom Jr., Public Service Commissioner and son of former governor Jim Folsom
- Finis St. John, state senator from Cullman
- Donald Stewart, incumbent U.S. senator
- Margaret E. Stewart, genealogist and perennial candidate

=== Results ===
1980 Democratic U.S. Senate primary
Party	Candidate	Votes	%
Democratic	Donald Stewart (incumbent)	222,540	48.63%
Democratic	Jim Folsom Jr.	163,196	35.67%
Democratic	Finis St. John	51,260	11.20%
Democratic	Margaret E. Stewart	20,582	4.50%
Total votes		457,578	100.00%

=== Runoff results ===
1980 Democratic U.S. Senate primary
Party	Candidate	Votes	%
Democratic	Jim Folsom Jr.	204,186	50.60%
Democratic	Donald Stewart (incumbent)	199,365	49.40%
Total votes		403,551	100.00%

== Republican primary ==
=== Candidates ===
- Jeremiah Denton, U.S. Navy veteran and former prisoner of war
- Armistead I. Selden Jr., former Democratic U.S. representative from Tuscaloosa and U.S. Ambassador to New Zealand, Fiji, and Samoa

=== Results ===
1980 Democratic U.S. Senate primary
Party	Candidate	Votes	%
Republican	Jeremiah Denton	73,708	63.80%
Republican	Armistead I. Selden Jr.	41,825	36.20%
Total votes		115,533	100.00%

== General election ==
=== Candidates ===
- William A. Crew (Libertarian)
- Jeremiah Denton, U.S. Navy veteran and former prisoner of war (Republican)
- Michael R. A. Erdey (Conservative)
- Sallie M. Hadnott (National Democratic)
- Jim Folsom Jr., Public Service Commissioner and son of former governor Jim Folsom (Democratic)
- Mohammed Oliver (Socialist Workers)
- Jim Partain (Statesman)

=== Results ===
1980 United States Senate election in Alabama
Party	Candidate	Votes	%
Republican	Jeremiah Denton	650,362	50.15%
Democratic	Jim Folsom	610,175	47.05%
Conservative	Michael R. A. Erdey	15,989	1.23%
Libertarian	William A. Crew	13,098	1.01%
NDPA	Sallie M. Hadnott	2,973	0.23%
Statesman Party	Jim Partain	2,649	0.20%
Socialist Workers	Mohammed Oliver	1,511	0.12%
Majority		40,187	3.10%
Turnout		1,296,757	
Republican gain from Democratic			

== See also ==
- 1980 United States Senate elections
- Reagan's coattails
