= Jeanette Scissum =

American space scientist (born 1939 or 1940)

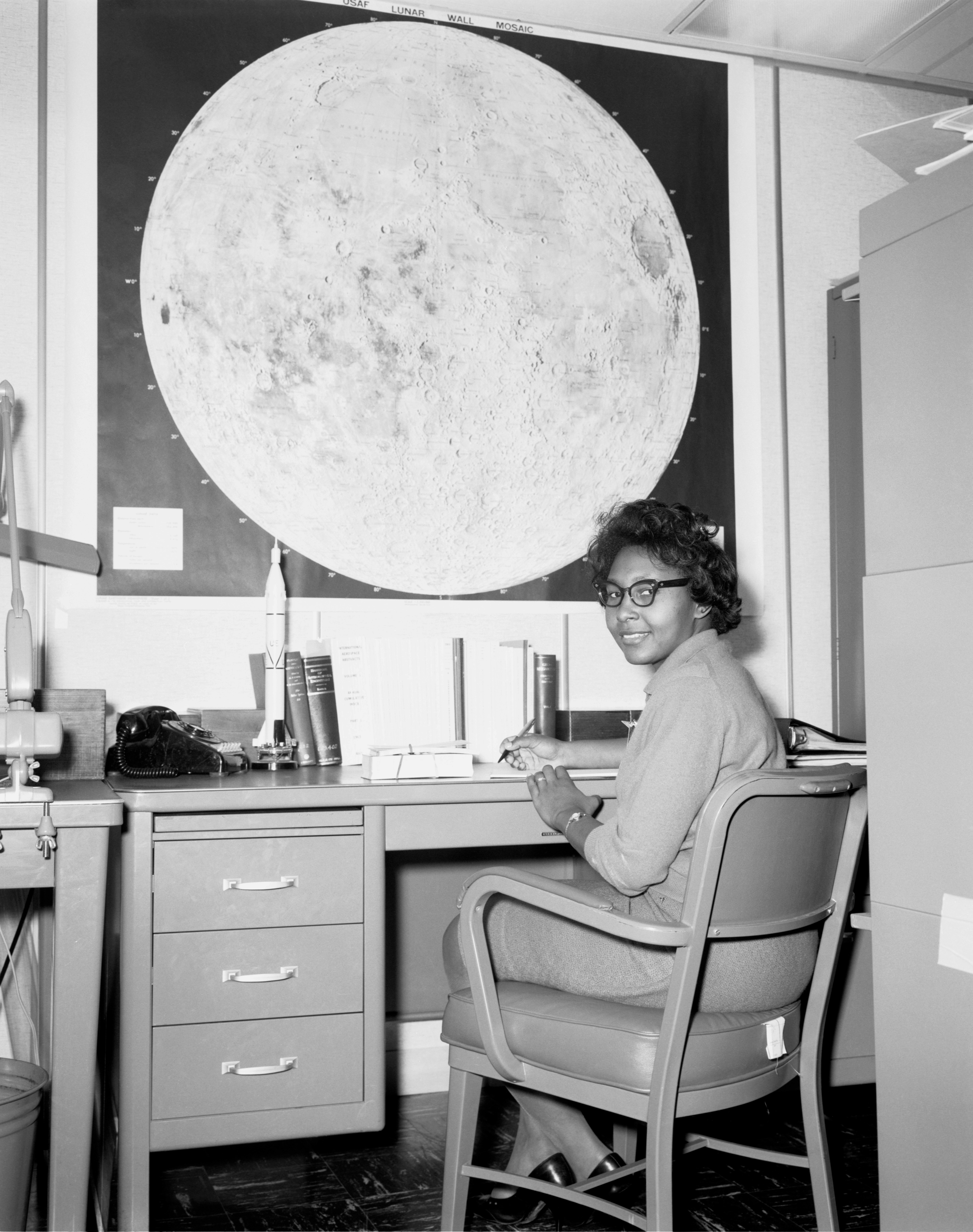
- Scissum at her desk in NASA
- Born: October 6, 1939 (age 86); Guntersville, Alabama, U.S.
- Education: Alabama A&M University

Jeanette Alexander Scissum (born October 6, 1939) was an American mathematician, space scientist, and diversity advocate who put forward techniques for improved forecasting of the sunspot cycle.

== Early life and education ==
Scissum was born in Guntersville, Alabama, the second youngest in a family of six children. Her father, an Army veteran, was a sharecropper who went to work for Cargill Granary and was eventually paralyzed and disabled. Her mother was a domestic worker. She attended Lakeview School, the only school for black children in the area, and graduated in 1956, where she was a good student and basketball player. Scissum's father was convinced that she would attend college and repeatedly told her this from a very young age. Scissum was awarded a small scholarship to study at Alabama A&M University which she supplemented by working at a telephone switchboard. She earned her bachelor's and master's degree in mathematics before returning to graduate school to get her PhD in computer science after 13 years at Marshall Space Flight Center.

== Career ==
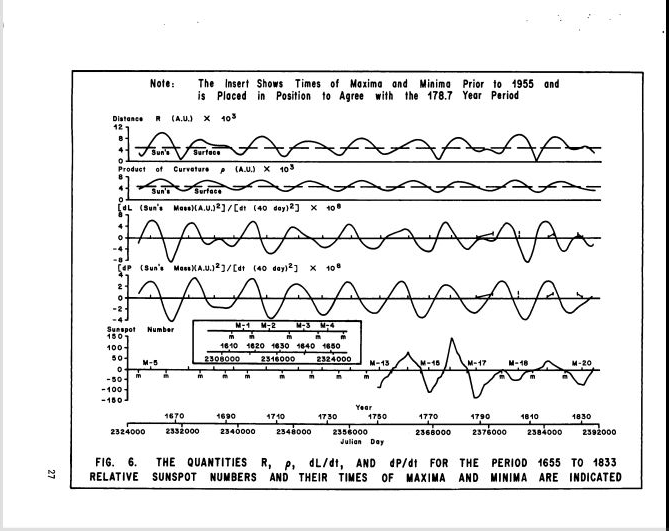
Page from "Survey of Solar Cycle Prediction Models"

Scissum started teaching at Councill Training School, Huntsville's only black high school. Here she very quickly realised that teaching was not for her as she worried about the students. Scissum joined NASA's Marshall Space Flight Center as an entry level mathematician in 1964 after a recommendation from a friend and was the first African-American mathematician to be employed by Marshall. She published a NASA report in 1967, “Survey of Solar Cycle Prediction Models,” which put forward techniques for improved forecasting of the sunspot cycle. In the mid-1970s, she worked as a space scientist in the Space Environment Branch of Marshall's Space Sciences Laboratory and she led activities in Marshall's Atmospheric, Magnetospheric, and Plasmas in Space project. Following the completion of her PhD, she later moved to Maryland to work in Goddard Space Flight Center as a computer systems analyst responsible for analyzing and directing NASA management information and technical support systems. She retired in 2005.

Scissum's accomplishments have earned her recognition by Mathematically Gifted & Black as a Black History Month 2018 Honoree.

== Diversity ==
Scissum was passionate about inclusion and volunteered to be an equal employment opportunity officer. Her contributions in this role were recognised by an award from NASA Administrator James Fletcher, but she did note that fighting for others sometimes put her own career in jeopardy. She was warned by a top female supervisor that management were unhappy with the number of complaints that she was handling. In 1975, Scissum wrote an article for the National Technical Association, "Equal Employment Opportunity and the Supervisor – A Counselor's View", which argued that many discrimination complaints could be avoided "through adequate and meaningful communication." She noted that her progression and the progression of her black colleagues was limited at NASA and expressed frustration and anger at this. "The problem (blacks) had was moving into management and being over people," Scissum said. "I guess (NASA) was afraid people would fight against it. I guess. It's hard to understand. It's always been hard for me to understand – the motivation for all this discrimination, because most of it seems unnecessary. It doesn't even have a reason."
