= Sheryll Cashin =

American law professor and author

- Born: December 15, 1961 (age 64); Huntsville, Alabama, U.S.
- Education: Vanderbilt University (BE); St Catherine's College, Oxford (MA); Harvard University (JD)
- Spouse: Marque Clark Chambliss
- Children: 2
- Father: John L. Cashin, Jr.

Sheryll D. Cashin (born December 15, 1961) is a law professor at Georgetown University Law Center. She was born and raised in Huntsville, Alabama, where her parents were political activists. Her parents' role in the civil rights movement impressed on her the importance of political engagement, and instilled values that still influence her research and discussion.

== Family and home ==
Political involvement and activism were ideals in Sheryll Cashin's family, leading her to pursue racial issues including segregation and inequality. At the start of the civil rights movement in early 1962, Cashin's mother Joan was arrested in a sit-in protest at a lunch counter, while holding the four month old Sheryll. Her father John L. Cashin, Jr., a dentist, was an influential civil-rights leader in Huntsville and Alabama in the late 1960s. He challenged George Wallace in the 1970 Alabama gubernatorial election. He founded a black-led third party in Alabama, the National Democratic Party of Alabama (NDPA), during the height of George Wallace's hegemony and enfranchised thousands of voters whom Jim Crow laws had excluded from the political process. Cashin's great-grandfather, Herschel V. Cashin was a radical Republican legislator in Alabama during Reconstruction. He was born in Antebellum Georgia, and was the child of a white Irishman and a free-mulatto woman.

Sheryll Cashin's family also became the first black family on the block, when they moved in 1966 from Lydia Drive in northwest Huntsville to Owens Drive, at the foot of Monte Sano.

== Education ==
Cashin graduated summa cum laude from Vanderbilt University in 1984 with a bachelor's degree in electrical engineering. She also obtained her masters in English Law with honors from St Catherine's College, Oxford in 1986 as a Marshall Scholar, and obtained her J.D. with honors from Harvard Law School in 1989.

== Career ==
While working in the Clinton White House, Cashin served as an advisor on urban and economic policy, particularly concerning community development in inner city neighborhoods. She was also law clerk to U.S. Supreme Court Justice Thurgood Marshall and Judge Abner Mikva of the U.S. Court of Appeals for the District of Columbia Circuit.

After her clerkships, Cashin worked as an Associate Counsel for the Office of Transition Counsel and as an associate at Sirote & Permutt, P.C.

As a professor of law at Georgetown University, Cashin teaches Constitutional Law, Local Government Law, Property, Administrative Law, and Race and American Law. She writes about race relations, government and inequality in America, as well as housing segregation.

== Literary career ==
Sheryll Cashin has written four books, including The Failures of Integration: How Race and Class are Undermining the American Dream, which depicts how segregation by race and class is ruining American democracy. After studying data on school enrollment and census tracts, Cashin drew that racial separation still persists in schools and communities. She argues that we need a transformation of the now ingrained assumption that separation is acceptable in order to solve the riddle of inequality in America."

The Agitator's Daughter: A Memoir of Four Generations of One Extraordinary African-American Family covers the arc of U.S. relations from slavery through the post-civil rights era.

Cashin has also contributed book chapters. She also has written journal articles, and is a frequent radio and T.V. commentator. She has appeared on NPR All Things Considered, The Diane Rehm Show, The Tavis Smiley Show, The Newshour With Jim Lehrer, CNN, BET, ABC News, and numerous local programs.

== Works ==
- The Failures of Integration: How Race and Class are Undermining the American Dream, New York: PublicAffairs, 2005. ISBN 9781586483395, OCLC 61441820
- The Agitator's Daughter: A Memoir of Four Generations of One Extraordinary African-American Family Public Affairs, 2009. ISBN 9781586487096, OCLC 246894726
- Place, not race : a new vision of opportunity in america. Boston: Beacon Press, 2015. ISBN 9780807080405, OCLC 886745360
- Loving : interracial intimacy in America and the threat to white supremacy, Boston: Beacon Press, 2017. ISBN 9780807041017, OCLC 1002908051
- White Space, Black Hood: Opportunity Hoarding and Segregation in the Age of Inequality, Boston: Beacon Press, 2021. ISBN 9780807000373, OCLC 1227976635

== See also ==
- List of law clerks for the tenth seat of the Supreme Court of the United States
