= 1970 Alabama gubernatorial election =

- November 3, 1970

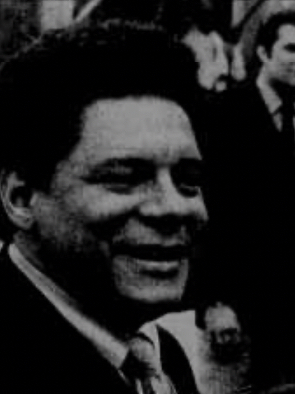

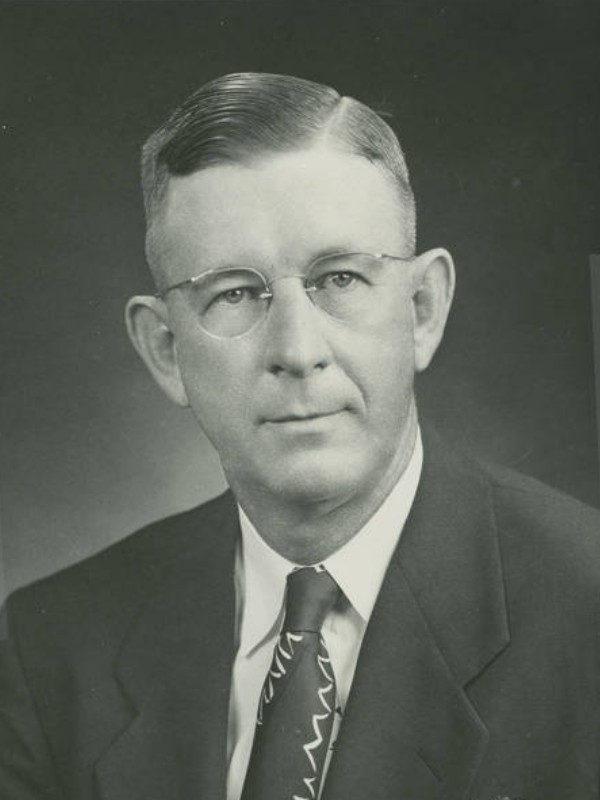
| Nominee | George Wallace | John L. Cashin Jr. | A. C. Shelton |
| Party | Democratic | NDPA | Independent |
| Popular vote | 637,046 | 125,491 | 75,679 |
| Percentage | 74.51% | 14.68% | 8.85% |
- County results Wallace: 50–60% 60–70% 70–80% 80–90% >90% Cashin Jr.: 40–50% 50–60% 60–70%
Governor before election
Albert Brewer
Democratic
Elected Governor
George Wallace
Democratic

The 1970 Alabama gubernatorial election was marked by a competitive Democratic primary battle between incumbent moderate Governor Albert Brewer and segregationist former governor and 1968 independent presidential candidate George Wallace. The Alabama Constitution was amended in 1968, allowing a governor to serve two consecutive terms.

== Democratic primary ==
=== Candidates ===
- Albert Brewer, incumbent Governor
- Coleman Brown
- Asa Carter, Ku Klux Klan leader and former Wallace speechwriter
- Jim Folsom, former Governor
- Ralph "Shorty" Price, perennial candidate
- George Wallace, former Governor
- Charles Woods, businessman

=== Campaign ===
Despite Wallace's popularity, Brewer was seen as an early front-runner. Brewer, who had been elected lieutenant governor in 1966, had become governor after the death of Governor Lurleen Wallace, George's wife. A moderate, he became the first gubernatorial candidate since Reconstruction to openly court black voters. Brewer, hoping to build a broad alliance between blacks and white working class voters, unveiled a progressive platform and accused Wallace of spending too much time outside the state, saying "Alabama needs a full-time governor.".

Republican President Richard Nixon endorsed Brewer in order to break Wallace's political career and secure Deep South votes for himself in the next presidential election. It was later discovered that Nixon had directed his reelection campaign to donate $400,000 to Brewer in secret cash payments.

Wallace, whose presidential ambitions would have been destroyed with a defeat, ran a very aggressive and dirty campaign using racist rhetoric while proposing few original ideas of his own. The Wallace campaign aired TV ads with slogans such as "Do you want the black block electing your governor?" and circulated an ad showing a white girl surrounded by seven black boys, with the slogan "Wake Up Alabama! Blacks vow to take over Alabama." Wallace called Brewer a sissy and promised not to run for president a third time.

=== Primary results ===
Democratic primary first round results by county Brewer: 30–40% 40–50% 50–60% 60–70% Wallace: 30–40% 40–50% 50–60% 60–70%

Democratic primary results
| Party | Candidate | Votes | % |
|---|---|---|---|
| Democratic | Albert Brewer (incumbent) | 428,146 | 41.98 |
| Democratic | George Wallace | 416,443 | 40.84 |
| Democratic | Charles Woods | 149,987 | 14.71 |
| Democratic | Asa Carter | 15,441 | 1.51 |
| Democratic | Jim Folsom | 4,123 | 0.40 |
| Democratic | Coleman Brown | 2,836 | 0.28 |
| Democratic | Shorty Price | 2,804 | 0.28 |
| Total votes | | 1,019,780 | 100 |

==== Runoff ====
Despite Brewer's victory in the first round, he failed to win a majority and was forced into a runoff with Wallace.

Democratic primary runoff results by county Wallace: 50–60% 60–70% 70–80% Brewer: 50–60% 60–70% 70–80%

Democratic runoff results
| Party | Candidate | Votes | % |
|---|---|---|---|
| Democratic | George Wallace | 559,832 | 51.56 |
| Democratic | Albert Brewer (incumbent) | 525,951 | 48.44 |
| Total votes | | 1,085,783 | 100 |

== General election ==
=== Endorsements ===
A. C. Shelton (I)

Newspaper

- Birmingham Post-Herald

=== Results ===
At the time, the Democratic primary in Alabama was regarded as more important than the general election, as Alabama was still essentially a one-party state in non-presidential elections. The Republican Party did not field a candidate, and Wallace easily won the general election.

1970 Alabama gubernatorial election
| Party | Candidate | Votes | % |
|---|---|---|---|
| Democratic | George Wallace | 637,046 | 74.51 |
| NDPA | John L. Cashin Jr. | 125,491 | 14.68 |
| Independent | A. C. Shelton | 75,679 | 8.85 |
| Prohibition | Jerome B. Couch | 9,705 | 1.14 |
| Independent | Menter G. Walker | 3,534 | 0.41 |
| Whig | John Watts | 3,497 | 0.41 |
| Total votes | | 854,952 | 100 |
| Democratic hold | | | |

== See also ==
- Governor of Alabama
