= Brooklyn, Conecuh County, Alabama =

Unincorporated community in Brownsville, Alabama

Brooklyn, Alabama
- Unincorporated community
- Location within Alabama Location within the United States
- Coordinates: 31°15′46″N 86°46′16″W
- Country: United States
- State: Alabama
- County: Conecuh
- Elevation: 157 ft (48 m)
- Time zone: UTC-6 (Central (CST))
  - Summer (DST): UTC-5 (CDT)
- ZIP code: 36429
- Area code: 251
- GNIS feature ID: 125435

Brooklyn is an unincorporated community in Conecuh County, Alabama, United States. Brooklyn is located on the southern border of Conecuh County, 16.1 miles (25.9 km) southeast of Evergreen. Brooklyn had a post office until it closed on November 19, 2011; it still has its own ZIP code, 36429.

== Demographics ==
Historical population
Census	Pop.	Note	%±
1880	67		—
U.S. Decennial Census

Brooklyn was listed as an unincorporated community on the 1880 U.S. Census as having a population of 67. It was the only time it was listed on the census.
