= Mabel Sanders Amos =

American politician

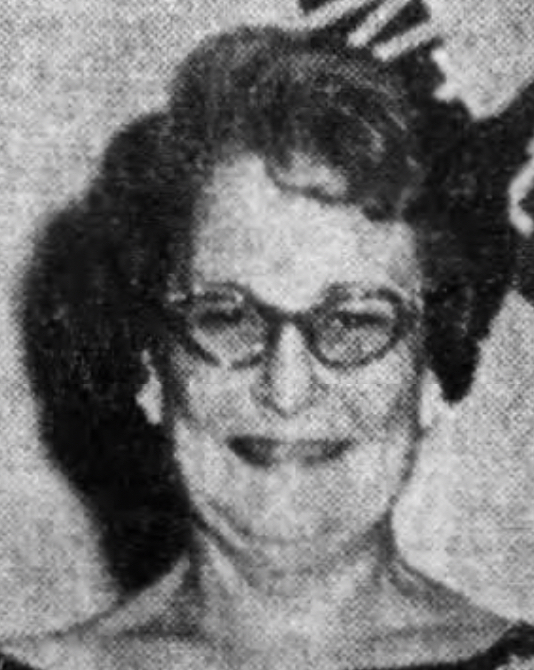
- Amos in 1962

42nd Secretary of State of Alabama
- In office 1967–1975
- Governor: Lurleen Wallace; Albert Brewer; George Wallace
- Preceded by: Agnes Baggett
- Succeeded by: Agnes Baggett

Personal details
- Born: June 3, 1900 Brooklyn, Conecuh County, Alabama, U.S.
- Died: November 5, 1999 (aged 99)
- Party: Democratic

Mabel Amos was an American politician who served as the 42nd secretary of state of Alabama from 1967 to 1975.

She was born on June 3, 1900, in Brooklyn, Conecuh County, Alabama. She attended Alabama College, now known as University of Montevallo, State Teachers College at Troy University and Peabody College in Nashville, Tennessee. In 1939, she was appointed Secretary to the Governor. Shortly after, she was promoted to recording secretary and served in that role for six Gubernatorial administrations.

She died on November 5, 1999.

Party political offices
Preceded by Agnes Baggett	Democratic nominee for Secretary of State of Alabama; 1966, 1970	Succeeded by Agnes Baggett
