= John L. Cashin Jr. =

American dentist, activist, and political candidate (1928–2011)

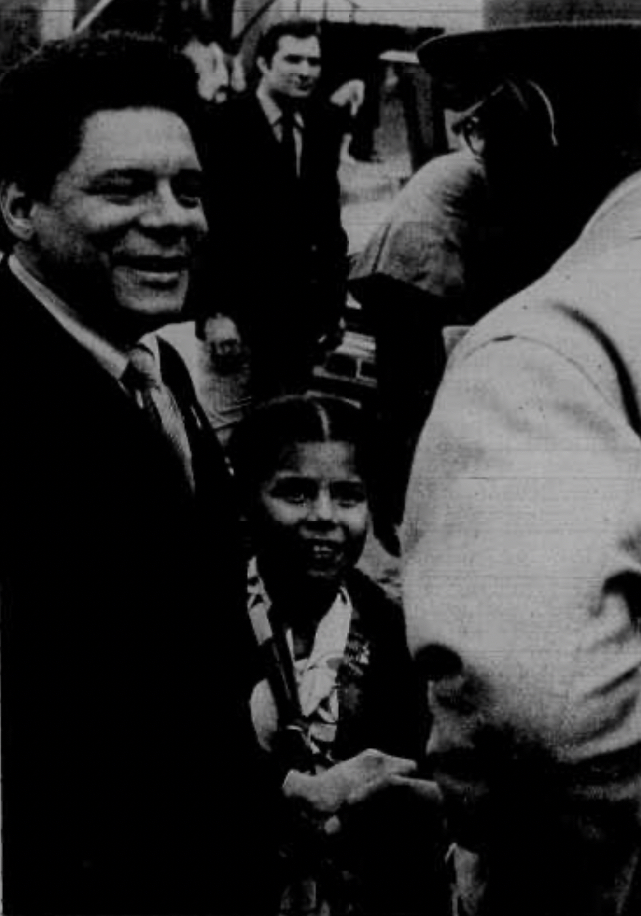
- Cashin in 1970
- Born: April 16, 1928; Huntsville, Alabama
- Died: March 21, 2011 (aged 82); Washington, D.C.
- Children: Sheryll Cashin

John Logan Cashin Jr. (April 16, 1928 – March 21, 2011) was an American dentist, civil rights campaigner, and politician. He was the founder and leader of the National Democratic Party of Alabama.

Born in Huntsville, Alabama, Cashin received his bachelor's degree from Tennessee State University and Doctor of Dental Surgery degree from Meharry Medical College School of Dentistry. Cashin's father was a dentist, and his mother was a school principal. Additionally, his grandfather Herschel Cashin served in the Alabama Legislature during the 1870s. From 1955 to 1957, Cashin served in the Army Dental Corps.

He was the party's nominee when he unsuccessfully ran for governor against George Wallace in the 1970 gubernatorial election. As the party's leader he spoke at the January 18, 1971 NDPA victory celebration in Eutaw, Alabama, after they swept the Greene County Election. NDPA candidates William McKinley Branch beat Judge Herndon while Thomas Gilmore defeated Sheriff Bill Lee. Cashin died on March 21, 2011, in a hospital in Washington, D.C., following a bout of pneumonia.

His daughter Sheryll Cashin is a professor at Georgetown University Law Center. He has two sons: John Cashin and Carroll.
