= National Democratic Party of Alabama =

Former political party in Alabama

National Democratic Party
- Founded: 1968
- Dissolved: 1982
- Split from: Alabama Democratic Party
- Merged into: Alabama Democratic Party
- Ideology: Anti-George Wallace; Civil Rights; Black Power; Desegregation; Liberalism; Progressivism
- National affiliation: Democratic Party

The National Democratic Party of Alabama (NDPA) was a political party active in the U.S. state of Alabama that opposed the segregationist governor George Wallace.

== 1968 election ==
During the 1968 presidential election, Alabama's Democratic Party supported the former Governor George Wallace who was the presidential nominee of the American Independent Party. Supporters of the national Democratic Party nominee, Vice President Hubert Humphrey, left the party to support the national slate.

In 1968 led by John L. Cashin, Jr., a dentist from Huntsville who had been active in the voter registration group the Alabama Democratic Conference, Democrats loyal to Humphrey and national Democratic Party formed the NDPA as a vehicle to field a slate of electors pledged to him and not to Wallace. Although the national Democratic Party supported Humphrey, Wallace was put on the ballot in his home state as official Democratic nominee. Additionally, in 1964, the Democratic Party of Alabama's electors were unpledged instead of being pledged to Lyndon Johnson, a moot point since Alabama voted in large numbers for Barry Goldwater.

There were precedent for the behavior of the state party machinery such as when Dixiecrat Strom Thurmond was the Democratic nominee in 1948 in some southern states despite Harry S. Truman being the Democratic nominee. In 1960, Democrat John F. Kennedy was on the ballot, but the state was carried by a split slate in which most electors were unpledged, opting for Virginia Senator Harry F. Byrd in the electoral college. In 1964, the Democrat Lyndon B. Johnson was not on the ballot in Alabama, and an unpledged electors slate was officially nominated by Alabama's Democrats.

At the time, Alabama listed all the electors on the ballot but not the presidential candidate, so Democratic presidential candidate Hubert Humphrey was supported by the National Democratic slate (whose most popular elector won 54,144 votes) and an "Alabama Independent Democrat" slate (whose most popular elector won 142,435 votes). Wallace was supported by the Democratic Party of Alabama and unaffiliated American Independent electors (they were unaffiliated since the totals of different electors couldn't be added together). In the election for the US Senate, Democratic candidate Jim Allen won 638,774 votes, to 201,227 votes for Republican Perry Hooper and 72,699 votes for National Democrat Robert P. Schwenn.

Wallace garnered 65.86% of the Alabama vote, with Humphrey coming second with 18.72%.

== Post 1968 activity ==
During the 1970 Alabama gubernatorial election, John Cashin ran as the NDPA candidate for governor against George Wallace, getting 15% of the vote. Wallace was easily re-elected with 637,046 (74.51%) votes against Cashin who won only 125,491 (14.68%).

The American bald eagle was the symbol of the NDPA, which was often opposed by the Democratic Rooster in local Democratic elections.

NDPA candidates ran in many other statewide races, but never polled above 31% or won any statewide office until losing ballot access in 1982.

== Local politics ==
The party became a prominent voice for African American voting rights and an important player in local politics in Black-dominated communities such as Greene County, Hale County, Perry County, Lowndes County and Dallas County, although it failed to make a lasting impact on state politics.

The NDPA was able to get around a hundred local officials elected, especially in the western part of the state. The political scientists Hanes Walton Jr. and William H. Boone cited the NDPA as an example of a successful sub-national African American political party.

The importance of the NDPA must be viewed in terms of the impact that it had on politics in the Alabama Black Belt. A number of elected officials credited Cashin and the NDPA for their success including Probate Judge William McKinley Branch, Sheriff without a Gun Thomas Gilmore and Peter Kirksey. Even after the revolution of the mid-1960s that brought these pioneers to power in Greene County, the shadow of the eagles hovered over Greene County for a generation.

== General election results ==
=== Federal offices ===
==== United States Senate ====
| Year | Class | Candidate | Votes | % | Place | Ref |
|---|---|---|---|---|---|---|
| 1980 | Class III | Sallie M. Hadnott | 2,973 | 0.23% | 5th of 7 | |
| 1972 | Class II | John L. LeFlore | 31,421 | 2.99% | 3rd of 5 | |
| 1968 | Class III | Robert P. Schwenn | 72,699 | 7.97% | 3rd of 3 | |

==== United States House of Representatives ====
| Year | District | Candidate | Votes | % | Place | Ref |
|---|---|---|---|---|---|---|
| 1976 | 6th | Billy E. Dorsey | 1,021 | 0.63% | 3rd of 3 | |
| 1974 | 1st | Mary B. McCarthy | 3,638 | 3.56% | 3rd of 3 | |
| 1974 | 7th | Lewis Black | 2,085 | 2.59% | 3rd of 3 | |
| 1972 | 1st | Thomas McAboy Jr. | 7,747 | 5.67% | 3rd of 3 | |
| 1972 | 2nd | Richard Boone | 4,991 | 3.41% | 3rd of 4 | |
| 1972 | 3rd | John Ford | 3,392 | 2.56% | 3rd of 4 | |
| 1972 | 5th | Shirley Irwin | 1,898 | 1.39% | 3rd of 3 | |
| 1972 | 6th | Al Thomas | 3,887 | 2.54% | 3rd of 5 | |
| 1972 | 7th | Lewis Black | 15,703 | 14.02% | 2nd of 3 | |
| 1970 | 1st | Noble Beasley | 13,798 | 13.18% | 3rd of 3 | |
| 1970 | 2nd | Percy Smith Jr. | 13,281 | 13.08% | 3rd of 3 | |
| 1970 | 3rd | Detroit Lee | 8,537 | 10.87% | 2nd of 2 | |
| 1970 | 4th | Wilpha Harrel Jr. | 1,903 | 2.05% | 3rd of 3 | |
| 1970 | 5th | T. Y. Rogers | 24,863 | 24.08% | 2nd of 2 | |
| 1970 | 8th | Thornton Stanley | 4,846 | 5.38% | 3rd of 4 | |
| 1968 | 1st | Noble Beasley | 4,679 | 4.43% | 3rd of 4 | |
| 1968 | 2nd | Richard Boone | 11,446 | 10.43% | 3rd of 3 | |
| 1968 | 3rd | Wilbur Johnston | 8,031 | 8.40% | 2nd of 3 | |
| 1968 | 4th | T. J. Clemons | 9,248 | 8.54% | 2nd of 3 | |
| 1968 | 5th | William McKinley Branch | 28,040 | 22.82% | 2nd of 5 | |
| 1968 | 6th | Thomas Wrenn | 12,976 | 11.09% | 3rd of 3 | |
| 1968 | 7th | James Bane | 2,258 | 1.62% | 3rd of 4 | |
| 1968 | 8th | Charlie Burgess | 7,140 | 6.35% | 3rd of 4 | |

=== State offices ===
==== Statewide constitutional ====
| Year | Race | Candidate | Votes | % | Place | Ref |
|---|---|---|---|---|---|---|
| 1982 | Gubernatorial | John Jackson | 4,693 | 0.42% | 5th of 7 | |
| 1970 | Gubernatorial | John L. Cashin Jr. | 125,491 | 14.68% | 2nd of 6 | |
| 1970 | Lieutenant gubernatorial | Isaiah Hayes III | 92,176 | 11.17% | 3rd of 5 | |
| 1970 | Secretary of state | Sally M. Hadnott | 100,526 | 13.33% | 2nd of 2 | |
| 1970 | State auditor | Mary Pandow | 102,015 | 13.80% | 2nd of 3 | |
| 1970 | State treasurer | Owen Butler | 96,944 | 13.02% | 2nd of 3 | |
| 1970 | Agriculture commissioner | John Henry Davis | 98,259 | 13.59% | 2nd of 3 | |

==== State senate ====
| Year | District | Candidate | Votes | % | Place |
|---|---|---|---|---|---|
| 1982 | 23rd | Bill Johnston | 1,734 | 6.14% | 3rd of 3 |
| 1974 | 7th | Ernestine Langford | 1,182 | 7.41% | 2nd of 2 |
| 1974 | 23rd | Robert Harris | 2,097 | 11.05% | 3rd of 3 |
| 1974 | 26th | Oscar Cook | 1,945 | 11.97% | 3rd of 4 |
| 1974 | 29th | Amelia Boynton Robinson | 6,483 | 30.07% | 2nd of 2 |
| 1974 | 30th | Martin Goodson | 2,799 | 14.52% | 2nd of 2 |
| 1970 | 2nd | Tom King | 940 | 4.90% | 2nd of 2 |
| 1970 | 7th | Lynn Ridgeway | 415 | 6.32% | 2nd of 2 |
| 1970 | 10th | H. Western | Lost | | 2nd of 2 |
| 1970 | 12th place 1 | John Billingsley | 25,917 | 20.55% | 2nd of 3 |
| 1970 | 12th place 2 | T. L. Crowell | 24,001 | 18.93% | 2nd of 3 |
| 1970 | 12th place 3 | Herbert Johnson | 22,448 | 18.19% | 2nd of 3 |
| 1970 | 12th place 4 | William. M. Pruitt | 23,062 | 18.44% | 2nd of 3 |
| 1970 | 12th place 5 | Georgia Price | 23,816 | 18.64% | 2nd of 4 |
| 1970 | 12th place 6 | Charles F. Williams | 23,160 | 18.57% | 2nd of 3 |
| 1970 | 12th place 7 | Emory. L. Whittaker | 24,424 | 19.55% | 2nd of 3 |
| 1970 | 18th | O. B. Wilson | 3,731 | 25.57% | 2nd of 3 |
| 1970 | 19th | Damon Kiel | 1,239 | 17.41% | 2nd of 2 |
