= List of United States Senate elections in Alabama =

United States Senate elections in Alabama occur when voters in the U.S. state of Alabama select an individual to represent the state in the United States Senate in either of the state's two seats allotted by the Constitution. Regularly scheduled general elections occur on Election Day, coinciding with various other federal, statewide, and local races.

Each state is allotted two U.S. Senators elected to staggered six-year terms, which were originally selected by the state legislature. The Senate is divided into three classes to stagger the terms of its members such that one-third of the Senate would be up for re-election every two years. Upon Alabama's admission to the Union in 1819, the state was assigned a Class 2 seat and a Class 3 seat, first elected in 1819. Since the passage of the Seventeenth Amendment in 1913, U.S. Senators are elected directly by the voters of each state. Special elections may be held to fill mid-term vacancies to elect an individual to serve the remainder of the unexpired term.

The list below contains results from all U.S. Senate elections held in Alabama after the passage of the Seventeenth Amendment, sorted by year. The next scheduled election for the Class 2 seat is in 2026, while the Class 3 seat will hold its next election in 2028.

== List of recent elections ==
=== Class 2 ===
Year	Winner				Runner-up				Others		Ref
Year	Candidate	Party	Votes	%	Candidate	Party	Votes	%	Votes	%	Ref
1918	John H. Bankhead	Democratic	54,880	100.00%							
1920 (sp)	James Thomas Heflin	Democratic	160,680	69.27%	Charles P. Lunsford	Republican	68,460	29.51%	2,820	1.22%	
1924	James Thomas Heflin*	Democratic	154,560	79.52%	Frank H. Lathrop	Republican	39,818	20.48%			
1930	John H. Bankhead II	Democratic	150,985	59.93%	James Thomas Heflin*	Independent	100,952	40.07%			
1936	John H. Bankhead II*	Democratic	239,532	87.02%	H. E. Berkstresser	Republican	33,697	12.24%	2,023	0.73%	
1942	John H. Bankhead II*	Democratic	69,212	100.00%							
1946 (sp)	John Sparkman	Democratic	163,217	100.00%							
1948	John Sparkman*	Democratic	185,534	84.00%	Paul G. Parsons	Republican	35,341	16.00%			
1954	John Sparkman*	Democratic	259,348	82.47%	Junius Foy Guin Jr.	Republican	55,110	17.53%			
1960	John Sparkman*	Democratic	389,196	70.24%	Julian Elgin	Republican	164,868	29.76%			
1966	John Sparkman*	Democratic	482,138	60.07%	John Grenier	Republican	313,018	39.00%	7,452	0.93%	
1972	John Sparkman*	Democratic	654,491	62.27%	Winton M. Blount	Republican	347,523	33.06%	49,085	4.67%	
1978	Howell Heflin	Democratic	547,054	93.99%	Jerome B. Couch	Prohibition	34,951	6.01%			
1984	Howell Heflin*	Democratic	860,535	62.76%	Albert L. Smith Jr.	Republican	498,508	36.35%	12,195	0.89%	
1990	Howell Heflin*	Democratic	717,814	60.55%	William J. Cabaniss	Republican	467,190	39.41%	559	0.04%	
1996	Jeff Sessions	Republican	786,436	52.45%	Roger Bedford Jr.	Democratic	681,651	45.46%	31,306	2.09%	
2002	Jeff Sessions*	Republican	792,561	58.58%	Susan Parker	Democratic	538,878	39.83%	21,584	1.59%	
2008	Jeff Sessions*	Republican	1,305,383	63.36%	Vivian Davis Figures	Democratic	752,391	36.52%	2,417	0.12%	
2014	Jeff Sessions*	Republican	795,606	97.25%	Scattered	Write-in	22,484	2.75%			
2017 (sp)	Doug Jones	Democratic	673,896	49.97%	Roy Moore	Republican	651,972	48.34%	22,852	1.69%	
2020	Tommy Tuberville	Republican	1,392,076	60.10%	Doug Jones*	Democratic	920,478	39.74%	3,891	0.17%	

County results of Class 2 elections since 2002

2002
Sessions vs. Parker

2008
Sessions vs. Figures

2014
Sessions unopposed

2017 (special)
Jones vs. Moore

2020
Tuberville vs. Jones

=== Class 3 ===
Year	Winner				Runner(s)-up				Others		Ref
Year	Candidate	Party	Votes	%	Candidate	Party	Votes	%	Votes	%	Ref
1914 (sp)	Francis S. White	Democratic	102,326	99.94%	Scattered	Write-in	58	0.06%			
1914	Oscar Underwood	Democratic	163,338	90.20%	Alex C. Birch	Republican	12,320	6.80%	4,263	2.35%	
1920	Oscar Underwood*	Democratic	154,664	66.10%	L. H. Reynolds	Republican	77,337	33.05%	1,984	0.85%	
1926	Hugo Black	Democratic	91,801	80.87%	Edmund H. Dryer	Republican	21,712	19.13%			
1932	Hugo Black*	Democratic	209,614	86.25%	J. Theodore Johnson	Republican	33,425	13.75%			
1938 (sp)	J. Lister Hill	Democratic	49,429	100.00%							
1938	J. Lister Hill	Democratic	113,413	86.38%	J. M. Pennington	Republican	17,885	13.62%	1	0.00%	
1944	J. Lister Hill*	Democratic	202,604	81.78%	John Posey	Republican	41,983	16.95%	3,162	1.28%	
1950	J. Lister Hill*	Democratic	125,534	76.54%	John G. Crommelin	Independent	38,477	23.46%			
1956	J. Lister Hill*	Democratic	330,182	100.00%							
1962	J. Lister Hill*	Democratic	201,937	50.86%	James D. Martin	Republican	195,134	49.14%			
1968	James Allen	Democratic	638,774	69.99%	Perry Hooper Sr.	Republican	201,227	22.05%			
1968	James Allen	Democratic	638,774	69.99%	Robert P. Schwenn	National Democratic	72,699	7.97%			
1974	James Allen*	Democratic	501,541	95.84%	Alvin Abercrombie	Prohibition	21,749	4.16%			
1978 (sp)	Donald Stewart	Democratic	401,852	55.06%	James D. Martin	Republican	316,170	43.32%	11,820	1.62%	
1980	Jeremiah Denton	Republican	650,362	50.15%	Jim Folsom Jr.	Democratic	610,175	47.05%	36,220	2.79%	
1986	Richard Shelby	Democratic	609,360	50.28%	Jeremiah Denton*	Republican	602,537	49.72%	56	0.00%	
1992	Richard Shelby*	Democratic	1,022,698	64.82%	Richard Sellers	Republican	522,015	33.08%	33,086	2.10%	
1998	Richard Shelby*	Republican	817,973	63.24%	Clayton Suddith	Democratic	474,568	36.69%	864	0.07%	
2004	Richard Shelby*	Republican	1,242,200	67.55%	Wayne Sowell	Democratic	595,018	32.35%	1,848	0.10%	
2010	Richard Shelby*	Republican	968,181	65.18%	William G. Barnes	Democratic	515,619	34.71%	1,699	0.11%	
2016	Richard Shelby*	Republican	1,335,104	63.96%	Ron Crumpton	Democratic	748,709	35.87%	3,631	0.17%	
2022	Katie Britt	Republican	942,154	66.62%	Will Boyd	Democratic	436,746	30.88%	35,338	2.50%	

County results of Class 3 elections since 2004

2004
Shelby vs. Sowell

2010
Shelby vs. Barnes

2016
Shelby vs. Crumpton

2022
Britt vs. Boyd

== See also ==
- List of United States senators from Alabama
- List of United States presidential elections in Alabama
- Elections in Alabama
