= List of United States senators from Alabama =

Current delegation

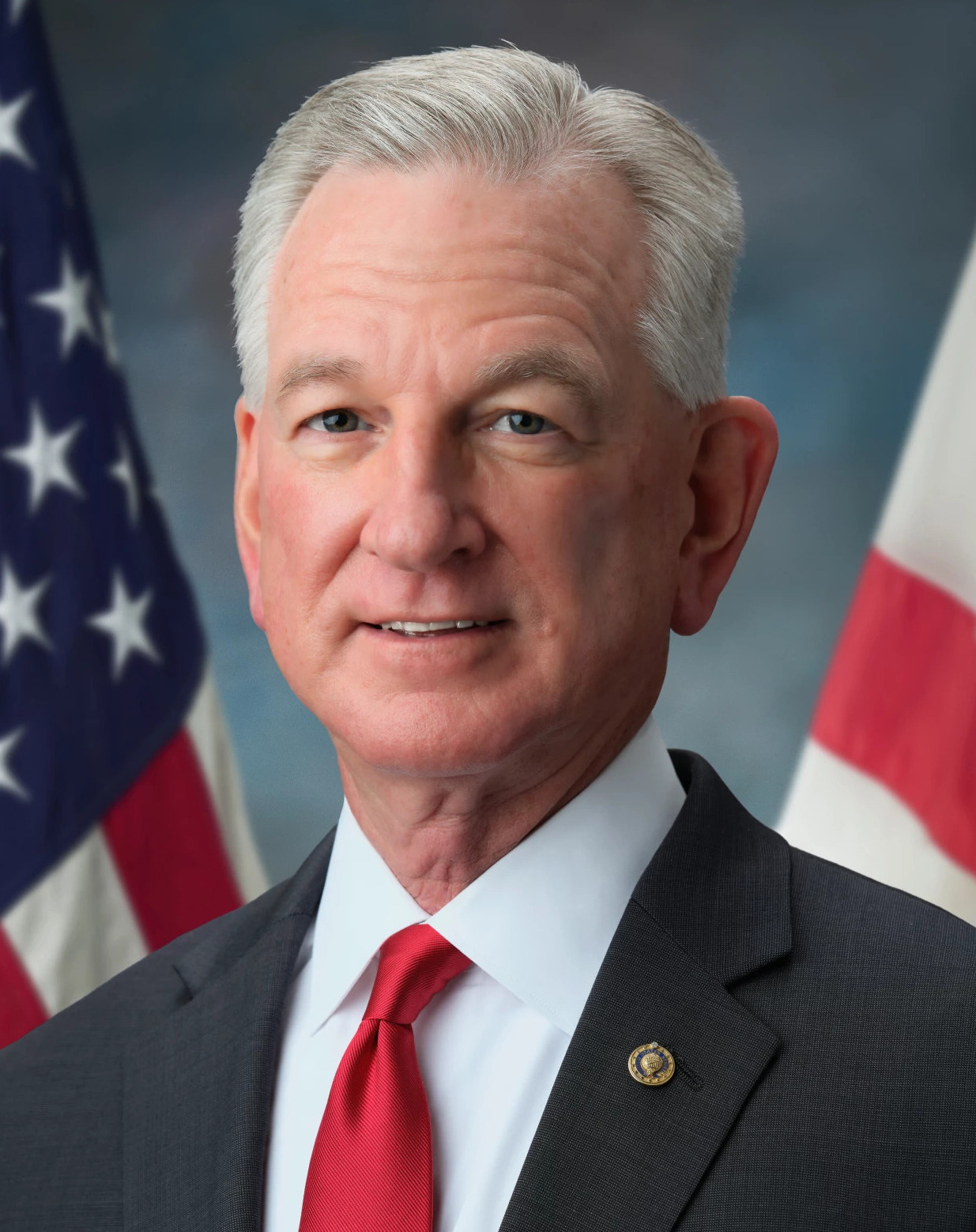
Tommy Tuberville (R)

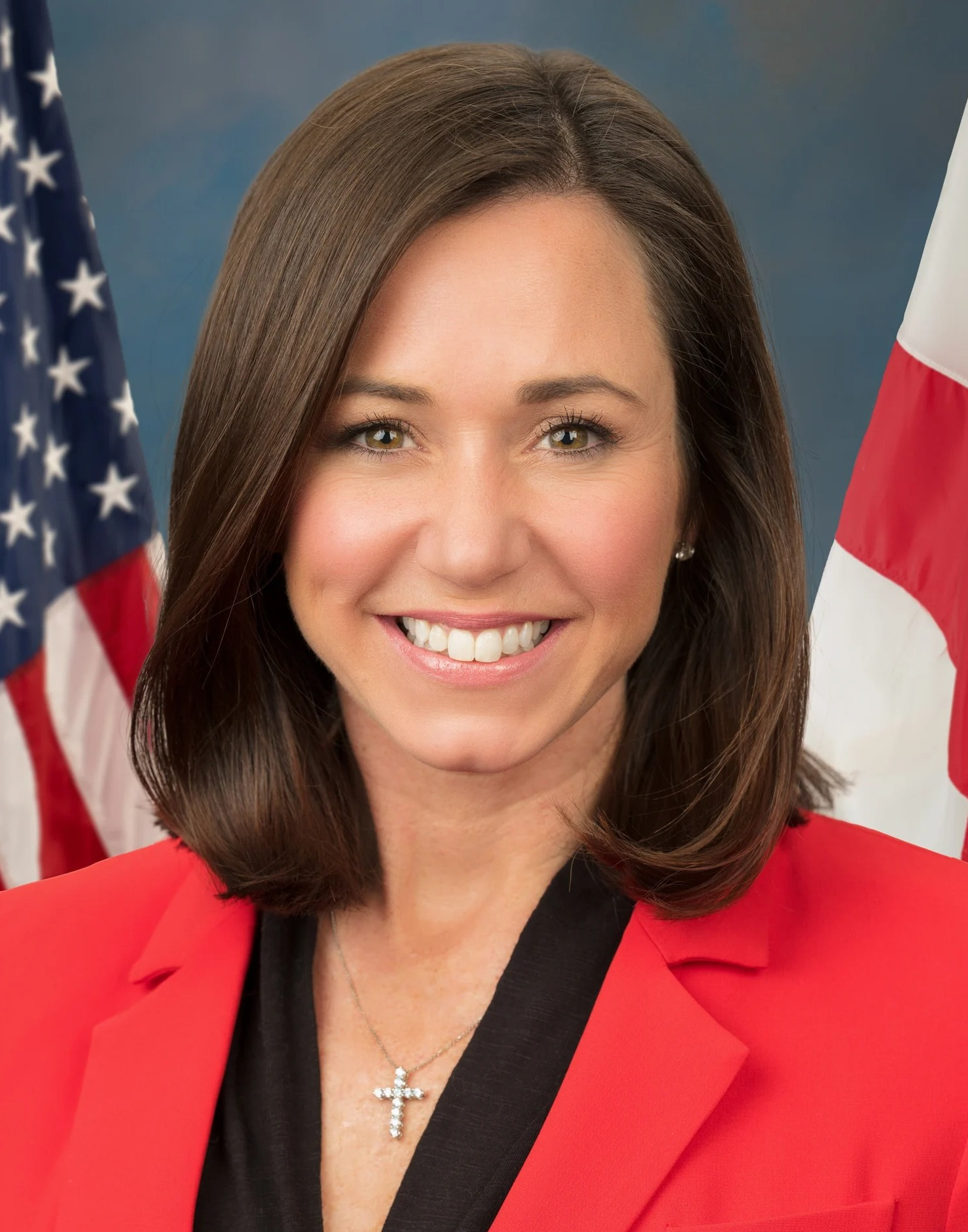
Katie Britt (R)

(ordered by seniority)

Alabama was admitted to the Union on December 14, 1819. The state elects U.S. senators to class 2 and class 3. Its United States Senate seats were declared vacant from March 1861 to July 1868 due to its secession from the Union during the American Civil War. Richard Shelby is Alabama's longest serving senator (served 1987–2023). Alabama's current U.S. senators are Republicans Tommy Tuberville (since 2021) and Katie Britt (since 2023).

== List of senators ==
Class 2 Class 2 senators belong to the electoral cycle that most recently had regular elections in 2008, 2014, 2020, and 2026. The next election will be in 2032.						C	Class 3 Class 3 senators belong to the electoral cycle that most recently had regular elections in 2004, 2010, 2016, and 2022. The next election will be in 2028.					
#	Senator	Party	Dates in office	Electoral history	T	C	T	Electoral history	Dates in office	Party	Senator	#
1	William R. King (Selma)	Democratic- Republican	Dec 14, 1819 – Apr 15, 1844	Elected in 1819.	1	16th	1	Elected in 1819. Resigned.	Dec 14, 1819 – Dec 12, 1822	Democratic- Republican	John Williams Walker (Huntsville)	1
1	William R. King (Selma)	Democratic- Republican	Dec 14, 1819 – Apr 15, 1844	Elected in 1819.	1	17th	1	Elected in 1819. Resigned.	Dec 14, 1819 – Dec 12, 1822	Democratic- Republican	John Williams Walker (Huntsville)	1
1	William R. King (Selma)	Democratic- Republican	Dec 14, 1819 – Apr 15, 1844	Elected in 1819.	1	17th	1	Elected to finish Walker's term. Retired.	Dec 12, 1822 – Mar 3, 1825	Democratic- Republican	William Kelly (Huntsville)	2
1	William R. King (Selma)	Democratic- Republican	Dec 14, 1819 – Apr 15, 1844	Re-elected in 1822.	2	18th	1	Elected to finish Walker's term. Retired.	Dec 12, 1822 – Mar 3, 1825	Democratic- Republican	William Kelly (Huntsville)	2
1	William R. King (Selma)	Jacksonian	Dec 14, 1819 – Apr 15, 1844	Re-elected in 1822.	2	19th	2	Elected in 1824 or 1825. Died.	Mar 4, 1825 – Jan 24, 1826	Jacksonian	Henry H. Chambers (Madison)	3
1	William R. King (Selma)	Jacksonian	Dec 14, 1819 – Apr 15, 1844	Re-elected in 1822.	2	19th	2		Jan 24, 1826 – Feb 17, 1826	Vacant		
1	William R. King (Selma)	Jacksonian	Dec 14, 1819 – Apr 15, 1844	Re-elected in 1822.	2	19th	2	Appointed to continue Chambers's term. Successor elected.	Feb 17, 1826 – Nov 27, 1826	Jacksonian	Israel Pickens (Cahaba)	4
1	William R. King (Selma)	Jacksonian	Dec 14, 1819 – Apr 15, 1844	Re-elected in 1822.	2	19th	2	Elected to finish Chambers's term. Lost re-election.	Nov 27, 1826 – Mar 3, 1831	Jacksonian	John McKinley (Florence)	5
1	William R. King (Selma)	Jacksonian	Dec 14, 1819 – Apr 15, 1844	Re-elected in 1822.	2	20th	2	Elected to finish Chambers's term. Lost re-election.	Nov 27, 1826 – Mar 3, 1831	Jacksonian	John McKinley (Florence)	5
1	William R. King (Selma)	Jacksonian	Dec 14, 1819 – Apr 15, 1844	Re-elected in 1828.	3	21st	2	Elected to finish Chambers's term. Lost re-election.	Nov 27, 1826 – Mar 3, 1831	Jacksonian	John McKinley (Florence)	5
1	William R. King (Selma)	Jacksonian	Dec 14, 1819 – Apr 15, 1844	Re-elected in 1828.	3	22nd	3	Elected in 1831. Lost re-election.	Mar 4, 1831 – Mar 3, 1837	Jacksonian	Gabriel Moore (Huntsville)	6
1	William R. King (Selma)	Jacksonian	Dec 14, 1819 – Apr 15, 1844	Re-elected in 1828.	3	23rd	3	Elected in 1831. Lost re-election.	Mar 4, 1831 – Mar 3, 1837	National; Republican	Gabriel Moore (Huntsville)	6
1	William R. King (Selma)	Jacksonian	Dec 14, 1819 – Apr 15, 1844	Re-elected in 1834.	4	24th	3	Elected in 1831. Lost re-election.	Mar 4, 1831 – Mar 3, 1837	National; Republican	Gabriel Moore (Huntsville)	6
1	William R. King (Selma)	Democratic	Dec 14, 1819 – Apr 15, 1844	Re-elected in 1834.	4	25th	4	Elected in 1837. Resigned to become a Justice of the U.S. Supreme Court.	Mar 4, 1837 – Apr 22, 1837	Democratic	John McKinley (Florence)	7
1	William R. King (Selma)	Democratic	Dec 14, 1819 – Apr 15, 1844	Re-elected in 1834.	4	25th	4		Apr 22, 1837 – Jun 19, 1837	Vacant		
1	William R. King (Selma)	Democratic	Dec 14, 1819 – Apr 15, 1844	Re-elected in 1834.	4	25th	4	Elected to finish McKinley's term. Resigned.	Jun 19, 1837 – Nov 15, 1841	Democratic	Clement Comer Clay (Huntsville)	8
1	William R. King (Selma)	Democratic	Dec 14, 1819 – Apr 15, 1844	Re-elected in 1834.	4	26th	4	Elected to finish McKinley's term. Resigned.	Jun 19, 1837 – Nov 15, 1841	Democratic	Clement Comer Clay (Huntsville)	8
1	William R. King (Selma)	Democratic	Dec 14, 1819 – Apr 15, 1844	Re-elected in 1840. Resigned to become U.S. Minister to France.	5	27th	4	Elected to finish McKinley's term. Resigned.	Jun 19, 1837 – Nov 15, 1841	Democratic	Clement Comer Clay (Huntsville)	8
1	William R. King (Selma)	Democratic	Dec 14, 1819 – Apr 15, 1844	Re-elected in 1840. Resigned to become U.S. Minister to France.	5	27th	4		Nov 15, 1841 – Nov 24, 1841	Vacant		
1	William R. King (Selma)	Democratic	Dec 14, 1819 – Apr 15, 1844	Re-elected in 1840. Resigned to become U.S. Minister to France.	5	27th	4	Elected to finish McKinley's term.	Nov 24, 1841 – Jun 16, 1848	Democratic	Arthur P. Bagby (Tuscaloosa)	9
1	William R. King (Selma)	Democratic	Dec 14, 1819 – Apr 15, 1844	Re-elected in 1840. Resigned to become U.S. Minister to France.	5	28th	5	Re-elected in 1842. Resigned to become U.S. Minister to Russia.	Nov 24, 1841 – Jun 16, 1848	Democratic	Arthur P. Bagby (Tuscaloosa)	9
Vacant			Apr 15, 1844 – Apr 22, 1844		5	28th	5	Re-elected in 1842. Resigned to become U.S. Minister to Russia.	Nov 24, 1841 – Jun 16, 1848	Democratic	Arthur P. Bagby (Tuscaloosa)	9
2	Dixon H. Lewis (Lowndesboro)	Democratic	Apr 22, 1844 – Oct 24, 1848	Appointed to finish King's term.	5	28th	5	Re-elected in 1842. Resigned to become U.S. Minister to Russia.	Nov 24, 1841 – Jun 16, 1848	Democratic	Arthur P. Bagby (Tuscaloosa)	9
2	Dixon H. Lewis (Lowndesboro)	Democratic	Apr 22, 1844 – Oct 24, 1848	Appointed to finish King's term.	5	29th	5	Re-elected in 1842. Resigned to become U.S. Minister to Russia.	Nov 24, 1841 – Jun 16, 1848	Democratic	Arthur P. Bagby (Tuscaloosa)	9
2	Dixon H. Lewis (Lowndesboro)	Democratic	Apr 22, 1844 – Oct 24, 1848	Elected in 1847. Died.	6	30th	5	Re-elected in 1842. Resigned to become U.S. Minister to Russia.	Nov 24, 1841 – Jun 16, 1848	Democratic	Arthur P. Bagby (Tuscaloosa)	9
2	Dixon H. Lewis (Lowndesboro)	Democratic	Apr 22, 1844 – Oct 24, 1848	Elected in 1847. Died.	6	30th	5		Jun 16, 1848 – Jul 1, 1848	Vacant		
2	Dixon H. Lewis (Lowndesboro)	Democratic	Apr 22, 1844 – Oct 24, 1848	Elected in 1847. Died.	6	30th	5	Appointed to continue Bagby's term. Elected to finish Bagby's term.	Jul 1, 1848 – Dec 20, 1852	Democratic	William R. King (Selma)	10
Vacant			Oct 24, 1848 – Nov 25, 1848		6	30th	5	Appointed to continue Bagby's term. Elected to finish Bagby's term.	Jul 1, 1848 – Dec 20, 1852	Democratic	William R. King (Selma)	10
3	Benjamin Fitzpatrick (Wetumpka)	Democratic	Nov 25, 1848 – Nov 30, 1849	Appointed to continue Lewis's term. Successor elected.	6	30th	5	Appointed to continue Bagby's term. Elected to finish Bagby's term.	Jul 1, 1848 – Dec 20, 1852	Democratic	William R. King (Selma)	10
3	Benjamin Fitzpatrick (Wetumpka)	Democratic	Nov 25, 1848 – Nov 30, 1849	Appointed to continue Lewis's term. Successor elected.	6	31st	6	Re-elected in 1848 or 1849. Resigned due to poor health.	Jul 1, 1848 – Dec 20, 1852	Democratic	William R. King (Selma)	10
4	Jeremiah Clemens (Huntsville)	Democratic	Nov 30, 1849 – Mar 3, 1853	Elected to finish Lewis's term. Lost re-election.	6	31st	6	Re-elected in 1848 or 1849. Resigned due to poor health.	Jul 1, 1848 – Dec 20, 1852	Democratic	William R. King (Selma)	10
4	Jeremiah Clemens (Huntsville)	Democratic	Nov 30, 1849 – Mar 3, 1853	Elected to finish Lewis's term. Lost re-election.	6	32nd	6	Re-elected in 1848 or 1849. Resigned due to poor health.	Jul 1, 1848 – Dec 20, 1852	Democratic	William R. King (Selma)	10
4	Jeremiah Clemens (Huntsville)	Democratic	Nov 30, 1849 – Mar 3, 1853	Elected to finish Lewis's term. Lost re-election.	6	32nd	6		Dec 20, 1852 – Jan 14, 1853	Vacant		
4	Jeremiah Clemens (Huntsville)	Democratic	Nov 30, 1849 – Mar 3, 1853	Elected to finish Lewis's term. Lost re-election.	6	32nd	6	Appointed to continue King's term. Elected in 1853 to finish King's term.	Jan 14, 1853 – Mar 3, 1855	Democratic	Benjamin Fitzpatrick (Wetumpka)	11
Vacant			Mar 4, 1853 – Nov 29, 1853	Legislature failed to elect.	7	33rd	6	Appointed to continue King's term. Elected in 1853 to finish King's term.	Jan 14, 1853 – Mar 3, 1855	Democratic	Benjamin Fitzpatrick (Wetumpka)	11
5	Clement Claiborne Clay (Huntsville)	Democratic	Nov 29, 1853 – Jan 21, 1861	Elected late in 1853.	7	33rd	6	Appointed to continue King's term. Elected in 1853 to finish King's term.	Jan 14, 1853 – Mar 3, 1855	Democratic	Benjamin Fitzpatrick (Wetumpka)	11
5	Clement Claiborne Clay (Huntsville)	Democratic	Nov 29, 1853 – Jan 21, 1861	Elected late in 1853.	7	34th	7	Legislature failed to elect.	Mar 4, 1855 – Nov 26, 1855	Vacant		11
5	Clement Claiborne Clay (Huntsville)	Democratic	Nov 29, 1853 – Jan 21, 1861	Elected late in 1853.	7	34th	7	Elected late. Withdrew. (Note: Clay and Fitzpatrick along with several other senators announced they were withdrawing from the Senate on January 21, 1861, due to their states' decisions to secede from the Union. Clay's seat was declared vacant by the Senate on March 14, 1861, but Fitzpatrick's was vacant because his term ended on March 4, 1861.)	Nov 26, 1855 – Jan 21, 1861	Democratic	Benjamin Fitzpatrick (Wetumpka)	11
5	Clement Claiborne Clay (Huntsville)	Democratic	Nov 29, 1853 – Jan 21, 1861	Elected late in 1853.	7	35th	7	Elected late. Withdrew.	Nov 26, 1855 – Jan 21, 1861	Democratic	Benjamin Fitzpatrick (Wetumpka)	11
5	Clement Claiborne Clay (Huntsville)	Democratic	Nov 29, 1853 – Jan 21, 1861	Re-elected in 1858. Withdrew.	8	36th	7	Elected late. Withdrew.	Nov 26, 1855 – Jan 21, 1861	Democratic	Benjamin Fitzpatrick (Wetumpka)	11
Vacant			Jan 21, 1861 – Jul 13, 1868	Civil War and Reconstruction	8	36th	7	Civil War and Reconstruction	Jan 21, 1861 – Jul 13, 1868	Vacant		
Vacant			Jan 21, 1861 – Jul 13, 1868	Civil War and Reconstruction	8	37th	8	Civil War and Reconstruction	Jan 21, 1861 – Jul 13, 1868	Vacant		
Vacant			Jan 21, 1861 – Jul 13, 1868	Civil War and Reconstruction	8	38th	8	Civil War and Reconstruction	Jan 21, 1861 – Jul 13, 1868	Vacant		
Vacant			Jan 21, 1861 – Jul 13, 1868	Civil War and Reconstruction	9	39th	8	Civil War and Reconstruction	Jan 21, 1861 – Jul 13, 1868	Vacant		
Vacant			Jan 21, 1861 – Jul 13, 1868	Civil War and Reconstruction	9	40th	9	Civil War and Reconstruction	Jan 21, 1861 – Jul 13, 1868	Vacant		
6	Willard Warner (Montgomery)	Republican	Jul 13, 1868 – Mar 3, 1871	Elected in 1868 to finish vacant term. Lost re-election.	9	40th	9	Elected in 1868 to finish vacant term.	Jul 13, 1868 – Mar 3, 1879	Republican	George E. Spencer (Decatur)	12
6	Willard Warner (Montgomery)	Republican	Jul 13, 1868 – Mar 3, 1871	Elected in 1868 to finish vacant term. Lost re-election.	9	41st	9	Elected in 1868 to finish vacant term.	Jul 13, 1868 – Mar 3, 1879	Republican	George E. Spencer (Decatur)	12
7	George Goldthwaite (Montgomery)	Democratic	Mar 4, 1871 – Mar 3, 1877	Elected in 1870. Retired.	10	42nd	9	Elected in 1868 to finish vacant term.	Jul 13, 1868 – Mar 3, 1879	Republican	George E. Spencer (Decatur)	12
7	George Goldthwaite (Montgomery)	Democratic	Mar 4, 1871 – Mar 3, 1877	Elected in 1870. Retired.	10	43rd	10	Re-elected in 1872. Retired.	Jul 13, 1868 – Mar 3, 1879	Republican	George E. Spencer (Decatur)	12
7	George Goldthwaite (Montgomery)	Democratic	Mar 4, 1871 – Mar 3, 1877	Elected in 1870. Retired.	10	44th	10	Re-elected in 1872. Retired.	Jul 13, 1868 – Mar 3, 1879	Republican	George E. Spencer (Decatur)	12
8	John T. Morgan (Selma)	Democratic	Mar 4, 1877 – Jun 11, 1907	Elected in 1876.	11	45th	10	Re-elected in 1872. Retired.	Jul 13, 1868 – Mar 3, 1879	Republican	George E. Spencer (Decatur)	12
8	John T. Morgan (Selma)	Democratic	Mar 4, 1877 – Jun 11, 1907	Elected in 1876.	11	46th	11	Elected in 1878. Died.	Mar 4, 1879 – Dec 31, 1879	Democratic	George S. Houston (Athens)	13
8	John T. Morgan (Selma)	Democratic	Mar 4, 1877 – Jun 11, 1907	Elected in 1876.	11	46th	11		Dec 31, 1879 – Jan 7, 1880	Vacant		
8	John T. Morgan (Selma)	Democratic	Mar 4, 1877 – Jun 11, 1907	Elected in 1876.	11	46th	11	Appointed to continue Houston's term. Successor qualified.	Jan 7, 1880 – Nov 23, 1880	Democratic	Luke Pryor (Athens)	14
8	John T. Morgan (Selma)	Democratic	Mar 4, 1877 – Jun 11, 1907	Elected in 1876.	11	46th	11	Elected to finish Houston's term.	Nov 24, 1880 – Mar 3, 1897	Democratic	James L. Pugh (Eufaula)	15
8	John T. Morgan (Selma)	Democratic	Mar 4, 1877 – Jun 11, 1907	Elected in 1876.	11	47th	11	Elected to finish Houston's term.	Nov 24, 1880 – Mar 3, 1897	Democratic	James L. Pugh (Eufaula)	15
8	John T. Morgan (Selma)	Democratic	Mar 4, 1877 – Jun 11, 1907	Re-elected in 1882.	12	48th	11	Elected to finish Houston's term.	Nov 24, 1880 – Mar 3, 1897	Democratic	James L. Pugh (Eufaula)	15
8	John T. Morgan (Selma)	Democratic	Mar 4, 1877 – Jun 11, 1907	Re-elected in 1882.	12	49th	12	Re-elected in 1884.	Nov 24, 1880 – Mar 3, 1897	Democratic	James L. Pugh (Eufaula)	15
8	John T. Morgan (Selma)	Democratic	Mar 4, 1877 – Jun 11, 1907	Re-elected in 1882.	12	50th	12	Re-elected in 1884.	Nov 24, 1880 – Mar 3, 1897	Democratic	James L. Pugh (Eufaula)	15
8	John T. Morgan (Selma)	Democratic	Mar 4, 1877 – Jun 11, 1907	Re-elected in 1888.	13	51st	12	Re-elected in 1884.	Nov 24, 1880 – Mar 3, 1897	Democratic	James L. Pugh (Eufaula)	15
8	John T. Morgan (Selma)	Democratic	Mar 4, 1877 – Jun 11, 1907	Re-elected in 1888.	13	52nd	13	Re-elected in 1890. Lost renomination.	Nov 24, 1880 – Mar 3, 1897	Democratic	James L. Pugh (Eufaula)	15
8	John T. Morgan (Selma)	Democratic	Mar 4, 1877 – Jun 11, 1907	Re-elected in 1888.	13	53rd	13	Re-elected in 1890. Lost renomination.	Nov 24, 1880 – Mar 3, 1897	Democratic	James L. Pugh (Eufaula)	15
8	John T. Morgan (Selma)	Democratic	Mar 4, 1877 – Jun 11, 1907	Re-elected in 1894.	14	54th	13	Re-elected in 1890. Lost renomination.	Nov 24, 1880 – Mar 3, 1897	Democratic	James L. Pugh (Eufaula)	15
8	John T. Morgan (Selma)	Democratic	Mar 4, 1877 – Jun 11, 1907	Re-elected in 1894.	14	55th	14	Elected in 1897.	Mar 4, 1897 – Jul 27, 1907	Democratic	Edmund Pettus (Selma)	16
8	John T. Morgan (Selma)	Democratic	Mar 4, 1877 – Jun 11, 1907	Re-elected in 1894.	14	56th	14	Elected in 1897.	Mar 4, 1897 – Jul 27, 1907	Democratic	Edmund Pettus (Selma)	16
8	John T. Morgan (Selma)	Democratic	Mar 4, 1877 – Jun 11, 1907	Re-elected in 1900.	15	57th	14	Elected in 1897.	Mar 4, 1897 – Jul 27, 1907	Democratic	Edmund Pettus (Selma)	16
8	John T. Morgan (Selma)	Democratic	Mar 4, 1877 – Jun 11, 1907	Re-elected in 1900.	15	58th	15	Re-elected in 1903. Re-elected early in 1907, but died.	Mar 4, 1897 – Jul 27, 1907	Democratic	Edmund Pettus (Selma)	16
8	John T. Morgan (Selma)	Democratic	Mar 4, 1877 – Jun 11, 1907	Re-elected in 1900.	15	59th	15	Re-elected in 1903. Re-elected early in 1907, but died.	Mar 4, 1897 – Jul 27, 1907	Democratic	Edmund Pettus (Selma)	16
8	John T. Morgan (Selma)	Democratic	Mar 4, 1877 – Jun 11, 1907	Re-elected in 1907. Died.	16	60th	15	Re-elected in 1903. Re-elected early in 1907, but died.	Mar 4, 1897 – Jul 27, 1907	Democratic	Edmund Pettus (Selma)	16
Vacant			Jun 11, 1907 – Jun 18, 1907		16	60th	15	Re-elected in 1903. Re-elected early in 1907, but died.	Mar 4, 1897 – Jul 27, 1907	Democratic	Edmund Pettus (Selma)	16
9	John H. Bankhead (Jasper)	Democratic	Jun 18, 1907 – Mar 1, 1920	Appointed to continue Morgan's term. Elected in 1907 to finish Morgan's term.	16	60th	15	Re-elected in 1903. Re-elected early in 1907, but died.	Mar 4, 1897 – Jul 27, 1907	Democratic	Edmund Pettus (Selma)	16
9	John H. Bankhead (Jasper)	Democratic	Jun 18, 1907 – Mar 1, 1920	Appointed to continue Morgan's term. Elected in 1907 to finish Morgan's term.	16	60th	15		Jul 27, 1907 – Aug 6, 1907	Vacant		
9	John H. Bankhead (Jasper)	Democratic	Jun 18, 1907 – Mar 1, 1920	Appointed to continue Morgan's term. Elected in 1907 to finish Morgan's term.	16	60th	15	Elected to finish Pettus's term.	Aug 6, 1907 – Aug 8, 1913	Democratic	Joseph F. Johnston (Birmingham)	17
9	John H. Bankhead (Jasper)	Democratic	Jun 18, 1907 – Mar 1, 1920	Appointed to continue Morgan's term. Elected in 1907 to finish Morgan's term.	16	61st	16	Re-elected in 1907 to next term. Died.	Aug 6, 1907 – Aug 8, 1913	Democratic	Joseph F. Johnston (Birmingham)	17
9	John H. Bankhead (Jasper)	Democratic	Jun 18, 1907 – Mar 1, 1920	Appointed to continue Morgan's term. Elected in 1907 to finish Morgan's term.	16	62nd	16	Re-elected in 1907 to next term. Died.	Aug 6, 1907 – Aug 8, 1913	Democratic	Joseph F. Johnston (Birmingham)	17
9	John H. Bankhead (Jasper)	Democratic	Jun 18, 1907 – Mar 1, 1920	Re-elected early January 17, 1911.	17	63rd	16	Re-elected in 1907 to next term. Died.	Aug 6, 1907 – Aug 8, 1913	Democratic	Joseph F. Johnston (Birmingham)	17
9	John H. Bankhead (Jasper)	Democratic	Jun 18, 1907 – Mar 1, 1920	Re-elected early January 17, 1911.	17	63rd	16	Henry De Lamar Clayton Jr. (D) was appointed in 1913 to continue the term, but his appointment was challenged and withdrawn. Franklin Potts Glass Sr. (D) was subsequently appointed to continue the term, but the Senate refused to seat him.	Aug 8, 1913 – May 11, 1914	Vacant		
9	John H. Bankhead (Jasper)	Democratic	Jun 18, 1907 – Mar 1, 1920	Re-elected early January 17, 1911.	17	63rd	16	Elected to finish Johnston's term. Retired.	May 11, 1914 – Mar 3, 1915	Democratic	Francis S. White (Birmingham)	18
9	John H. Bankhead (Jasper)	Democratic	Jun 18, 1907 – Mar 1, 1920	Re-elected early January 17, 1911.	17	64th	17	Elected in 1914.	Mar 4, 1915 – Mar 3, 1927	Democratic	Oscar Underwood (Birmingham)	19
9	John H. Bankhead (Jasper)	Democratic	Jun 18, 1907 – Mar 1, 1920	Re-elected early January 17, 1911.	17	65th	17	Elected in 1914.	Mar 4, 1915 – Mar 3, 1927	Democratic	Oscar Underwood (Birmingham)	19
9	John H. Bankhead (Jasper)	Democratic	Jun 18, 1907 – Mar 1, 1920	Re-elected in 1918. Died.	18	66th	17	Elected in 1914.	Mar 4, 1915 – Mar 3, 1927	Democratic	Oscar Underwood (Birmingham)	19
Vacant			Mar 1, 1920 – Mar 5, 1920		18	66th	17	Elected in 1914.	Mar 4, 1915 – Mar 3, 1927	Democratic	Oscar Underwood (Birmingham)	19
10	B. B. Comer (Birmingham)	Democratic	Mar 5, 1920 – Nov 2, 1920	Appointed to continue Bankhead's term. Successor elected.	18	66th	17	Elected in 1914.	Mar 4, 1915 – Mar 3, 1927	Democratic	Oscar Underwood (Birmingham)	19
11	J. Thomas Heflin (Lafayette)	Democratic	Nov 3, 1920 – Mar 3, 1931	Elected to finish Bankhead's term.	18	66th	17	Elected in 1914.	Mar 4, 1915 – Mar 3, 1927	Democratic	Oscar Underwood (Birmingham)	19
11	J. Thomas Heflin (Lafayette)	Democratic	Nov 3, 1920 – Mar 3, 1931	Elected to finish Bankhead's term.	18	67th	18	Re-elected in 1920. Retired.	Mar 4, 1915 – Mar 3, 1927	Democratic	Oscar Underwood (Birmingham)	19
11	J. Thomas Heflin (Lafayette)	Democratic	Nov 3, 1920 – Mar 3, 1931	Elected to finish Bankhead's term.	18	68th	18	Re-elected in 1920. Retired.	Mar 4, 1915 – Mar 3, 1927	Democratic	Oscar Underwood (Birmingham)	19
11	J. Thomas Heflin (Lafayette)	Democratic	Nov 3, 1920 – Mar 3, 1931	Re-elected in 1924. Lost renomination then lost re-election as an independent.	19	69th	18	Re-elected in 1920. Retired.	Mar 4, 1915 – Mar 3, 1927	Democratic	Oscar Underwood (Birmingham)	19
11	J. Thomas Heflin (Lafayette)	Democratic	Nov 3, 1920 – Mar 3, 1931	Re-elected in 1924. Lost renomination then lost re-election as an independent.	19	70th	19	Elected in 1926.	Mar 4, 1927 – Aug 19, 1937	Democratic	Hugo Black (Birmingham)	20
11	J. Thomas Heflin (Lafayette)	Democratic	Nov 3, 1920 – Mar 3, 1931	Re-elected in 1924. Lost renomination then lost re-election as an independent.	19	71st	19	Elected in 1926.	Mar 4, 1927 – Aug 19, 1937	Democratic	Hugo Black (Birmingham)	20
12	John H. Bankhead II (Jasper)	Democratic	Mar 4, 1931 – Jun 12, 1946	Elected in 1930.	20	72nd	19	Elected in 1926.	Mar 4, 1927 – Aug 19, 1937	Democratic	Hugo Black (Birmingham)	20
12	John H. Bankhead II (Jasper)	Democratic	Mar 4, 1931 – Jun 12, 1946	Elected in 1930.	20	73rd	20	Re-elected in 1932. Resigned to become a Justice of the U.S. Supreme Court.	Mar 4, 1927 – Aug 19, 1937	Democratic	Hugo Black (Birmingham)	20
12	John H. Bankhead II (Jasper)	Democratic	Mar 4, 1931 – Jun 12, 1946	Elected in 1930.	20	74th	20	Re-elected in 1932. Resigned to become a Justice of the U.S. Supreme Court.	Mar 4, 1927 – Aug 19, 1937	Democratic	Hugo Black (Birmingham)	20
12	John H. Bankhead II (Jasper)	Democratic	Mar 4, 1931 – Jun 12, 1946	Re-elected in 1936.	21	75th	20	Re-elected in 1932. Resigned to become a Justice of the U.S. Supreme Court.	Mar 4, 1927 – Aug 19, 1937	Democratic	Hugo Black (Birmingham)	20
12	John H. Bankhead II (Jasper)	Democratic	Mar 4, 1931 – Jun 12, 1946	Re-elected in 1936.	21	75th	20	Appointed by her husband to continue Black's term. Resigned when her successor won the Democratic primary.	Aug 20, 1937 – Jan 10, 1938	Democratic	Dixie Bibb Graves (Montgomery)	21
12	John H. Bankhead II (Jasper)	Democratic	Mar 4, 1931 – Jun 12, 1946	Re-elected in 1936.	21	75th	20	Appointed to continue Black's term. Elected in 1938 to finish Black's term.	Jan 11, 1938 – Jan 3, 1969	Democratic	J. Lister Hill (Montgomery)	22
12	John H. Bankhead II (Jasper)	Democratic	Mar 4, 1931 – Jun 12, 1946	Re-elected in 1936.	21	76th	21	Re-elected in 1938.	Jan 11, 1938 – Jan 3, 1969	Democratic	J. Lister Hill (Montgomery)	22
12	John H. Bankhead II (Jasper)	Democratic	Mar 4, 1931 – Jun 12, 1946	Re-elected in 1936.	21	77th	21	Re-elected in 1938.	Jan 11, 1938 – Jan 3, 1969	Democratic	J. Lister Hill (Montgomery)	22
12	John H. Bankhead II (Jasper)	Democratic	Mar 4, 1931 – Jun 12, 1946	Re-elected in 1942. Died.	22	78th	21	Re-elected in 1938.	Jan 11, 1938 – Jan 3, 1969	Democratic	J. Lister Hill (Montgomery)	22
12	John H. Bankhead II (Jasper)	Democratic	Mar 4, 1931 – Jun 12, 1946	Re-elected in 1942. Died.	22	79th	21	Re-elected in 1938.	Jan 11, 1938 – Jan 3, 1969	Democratic	J. Lister Hill (Montgomery)	22
Vacant			Jun 12, 1946 – Jun 15, 1946		22	79th	21	Re-elected in 1938.	Jan 11, 1938 – Jan 3, 1969	Democratic	J. Lister Hill (Montgomery)	22
13	George R. Swift (Atmore)	Democratic	Jun 15, 1946 – Nov 5, 1946	Appointed to continue Bankhead's term. Successor elected.	22	79th	21	Re-elected in 1938.	Jan 11, 1938 – Jan 3, 1969	Democratic	J. Lister Hill (Montgomery)	22
14	John Sparkman (Huntsville)	Democratic	Nov 6, 1946 – Jan 3, 1979	Elected to finish Bankhead's term.	22	79th	21	Re-elected in 1938.	Jan 11, 1938 – Jan 3, 1969	Democratic	J. Lister Hill (Montgomery)	22
14	John Sparkman (Huntsville)	Democratic	Nov 6, 1946 – Jan 3, 1979	Elected to finish Bankhead's term.	22	79th	22	Re-elected in 1944.	Jan 11, 1938 – Jan 3, 1969	Democratic	J. Lister Hill (Montgomery)	22
14	John Sparkman (Huntsville)	Democratic	Nov 6, 1946 – Jan 3, 1979	Elected to finish Bankhead's term.	22	80th	22	Re-elected in 1944.	Jan 11, 1938 – Jan 3, 1969	Democratic	J. Lister Hill (Montgomery)	22
14	John Sparkman (Huntsville)	Democratic	Nov 6, 1946 – Jan 3, 1979	Re-elected in 1948.	23	81st	22	Re-elected in 1944.	Jan 11, 1938 – Jan 3, 1969	Democratic	J. Lister Hill (Montgomery)	22
14	John Sparkman (Huntsville)	Democratic	Nov 6, 1946 – Jan 3, 1979	Re-elected in 1948.	23	82nd	23	Re-elected in 1950.	Jan 11, 1938 – Jan 3, 1969	Democratic	J. Lister Hill (Montgomery)	22
14	John Sparkman (Huntsville)	Democratic	Nov 6, 1946 – Jan 3, 1979	Re-elected in 1948.	23	83rd	23	Re-elected in 1950.	Jan 11, 1938 – Jan 3, 1969	Democratic	J. Lister Hill (Montgomery)	22
14	John Sparkman (Huntsville)	Democratic	Nov 6, 1946 – Jan 3, 1979	Re-elected in 1954.	24	84th	23	Re-elected in 1950.	Jan 11, 1938 – Jan 3, 1969	Democratic	J. Lister Hill (Montgomery)	22
14	John Sparkman (Huntsville)	Democratic	Nov 6, 1946 – Jan 3, 1979	Re-elected in 1954.	24	85th	24	Re-elected in 1956.	Jan 11, 1938 – Jan 3, 1969	Democratic	J. Lister Hill (Montgomery)	22
14	John Sparkman (Huntsville)	Democratic	Nov 6, 1946 – Jan 3, 1979	Re-elected in 1954.	24	86th	24	Re-elected in 1956.	Jan 11, 1938 – Jan 3, 1969	Democratic	J. Lister Hill (Montgomery)	22
14	John Sparkman (Huntsville)	Democratic	Nov 6, 1946 – Jan 3, 1979	Re-elected in 1960.	25	87th	24	Re-elected in 1956.	Jan 11, 1938 – Jan 3, 1969	Democratic	J. Lister Hill (Montgomery)	22
14	John Sparkman (Huntsville)	Democratic	Nov 6, 1946 – Jan 3, 1979	Re-elected in 1960.	25	88th	25	Re-elected in 1962. Retired.	Jan 11, 1938 – Jan 3, 1969	Democratic	J. Lister Hill (Montgomery)	22
14	John Sparkman (Huntsville)	Democratic	Nov 6, 1946 – Jan 3, 1979	Re-elected in 1960.	25	89th	25	Re-elected in 1962. Retired.	Jan 11, 1938 – Jan 3, 1969	Democratic	J. Lister Hill (Montgomery)	22
14	John Sparkman (Huntsville)	Democratic	Nov 6, 1946 – Jan 3, 1979	Re-elected in 1966.	26	90th	25	Re-elected in 1962. Retired.	Jan 11, 1938 – Jan 3, 1969	Democratic	J. Lister Hill (Montgomery)	22
14	John Sparkman (Huntsville)	Democratic	Nov 6, 1946 – Jan 3, 1979	Re-elected in 1966.	26	91st	26	Elected in 1968.	Jan 3, 1969 – Jun 1, 1978	Democratic	James Allen (Gadsden)	23
14	John Sparkman (Huntsville)	Democratic	Nov 6, 1946 – Jan 3, 1979	Re-elected in 1966.	26	92nd	26	Elected in 1968.	Jan 3, 1969 – Jun 1, 1978	Democratic	James Allen (Gadsden)	23
14	John Sparkman (Huntsville)	Democratic	Nov 6, 1946 – Jan 3, 1979	Re-elected in 1972. Retired.	27	93rd	26	Elected in 1968.	Jan 3, 1969 – Jun 1, 1978	Democratic	James Allen (Gadsden)	23
14	John Sparkman (Huntsville)	Democratic	Nov 6, 1946 – Jan 3, 1979	Re-elected in 1972. Retired.	27	94th	27	Re-elected in 1974. Died.	Jan 3, 1969 – Jun 1, 1978	Democratic	James Allen (Gadsden)	23
14	John Sparkman (Huntsville)	Democratic	Nov 6, 1946 – Jan 3, 1979	Re-elected in 1972. Retired.	27	95th	27	Re-elected in 1974. Died.	Jan 3, 1969 – Jun 1, 1978	Democratic	James Allen (Gadsden)	23
14	John Sparkman (Huntsville)	Democratic	Nov 6, 1946 – Jan 3, 1979	Re-elected in 1972. Retired.	27	95th	27	Appointed to continue her husband's term. Lost nomination to finish her husband's term.	Jun 8, 1978 – Nov 7, 1978	Democratic	Maryon Pittman Allen (Gadsden)	24
14	John Sparkman (Huntsville)	Democratic	Nov 6, 1946 – Jan 3, 1979	Re-elected in 1972. Retired.	27	95th	27	Elected to finish James Allen's term. Lost renomination; resigned one day early to give his successor advantageous seniority.	Nov 7, 1978 – Jan 2, 1981	Democratic	Donald Stewart (Anniston)	25
15	Howell Heflin (Tuscumbia)	Democratic	Jan 3, 1979 – Jan 3, 1997	Elected in 1978.	28	96th	27	Elected to finish James Allen's term. Lost renomination; resigned one day early to give his successor advantageous seniority.	Nov 7, 1978 – Jan 2, 1981	Democratic	Donald Stewart (Anniston)	25
15	Howell Heflin (Tuscumbia)	Democratic	Jan 3, 1979 – Jan 3, 1997	Elected in 1978.	28	96th	27	Appointed to finish James Allen's term, having already been elected to the next term.	Jan 2, 1981 – Jan 3, 1987	Republican	Jeremiah Denton (Mobile)	26
15	Howell Heflin (Tuscumbia)	Democratic	Jan 3, 1979 – Jan 3, 1997	Elected in 1978.	28	97th	28	Elected in 1980. Lost re-election.	Jan 2, 1981 – Jan 3, 1987	Republican	Jeremiah Denton (Mobile)	26
15	Howell Heflin (Tuscumbia)	Democratic	Jan 3, 1979 – Jan 3, 1997	Elected in 1978.	28	98th	28	Elected in 1980. Lost re-election.	Jan 2, 1981 – Jan 3, 1987	Republican	Jeremiah Denton (Mobile)	26
15	Howell Heflin (Tuscumbia)	Democratic	Jan 3, 1979 – Jan 3, 1997	Re-elected in 1984.	29	99th	28	Elected in 1980. Lost re-election.	Jan 2, 1981 – Jan 3, 1987	Republican	Jeremiah Denton (Mobile)	26
15	Howell Heflin (Tuscumbia)	Democratic	Jan 3, 1979 – Jan 3, 1997	Re-elected in 1984.	29	100th	29	Elected in 1986.	Jan 3, 1987 – Jan 3, 2023	Democratic	Richard Shelby (Tuscaloosa)	27
15	Howell Heflin (Tuscumbia)	Democratic	Jan 3, 1979 – Jan 3, 1997	Re-elected in 1984.	29	101st	29	Elected in 1986.	Jan 3, 1987 – Jan 3, 2023	Democratic	Richard Shelby (Tuscaloosa)	27
15	Howell Heflin (Tuscumbia)	Democratic	Jan 3, 1979 – Jan 3, 1997	Re-elected in 1990. Retired.	30	102nd	29	Elected in 1986.	Jan 3, 1987 – Jan 3, 2023	Democratic	Richard Shelby (Tuscaloosa)	27
15	Howell Heflin (Tuscumbia)	Democratic	Jan 3, 1979 – Jan 3, 1997	Re-elected in 1990. Retired.	30	103rd	30	Re-elected in 1992. Changed parties in 1994.	Jan 3, 1987 – Jan 3, 2023	Democratic	Richard Shelby (Tuscaloosa)	27
15	Howell Heflin (Tuscumbia)	Democratic	Jan 3, 1979 – Jan 3, 1997	Re-elected in 1990. Retired.	30	103rd	30	Re-elected in 1992. Changed parties in 1994.	Jan 3, 1987 – Jan 3, 2023	Republican	Richard Shelby (Tuscaloosa)	27
15	Howell Heflin (Tuscumbia)	Democratic	Jan 3, 1979 – Jan 3, 1997	Re-elected in 1990. Retired.	30	104th	30	Re-elected in 1992. Changed parties in 1994.	Jan 3, 1987 – Jan 3, 2023	Republican	Richard Shelby (Tuscaloosa)	27
16	Jeff Sessions (Mobile)	Republican	Jan 3, 1997 – Feb 8, 2017	Elected in 1996.	31	105th	30	Re-elected in 1992. Changed parties in 1994.	Jan 3, 1987 – Jan 3, 2023	Republican	Richard Shelby (Tuscaloosa)	27
16	Jeff Sessions (Mobile)	Republican	Jan 3, 1997 – Feb 8, 2017	Elected in 1996.	31	106th	31	Re-elected in 1998.	Jan 3, 1987 – Jan 3, 2023	Republican	Richard Shelby (Tuscaloosa)	27
16	Jeff Sessions (Mobile)	Republican	Jan 3, 1997 – Feb 8, 2017	Elected in 1996.	31	107th	31	Re-elected in 1998.	Jan 3, 1987 – Jan 3, 2023	Republican	Richard Shelby (Tuscaloosa)	27
16	Jeff Sessions (Mobile)	Republican	Jan 3, 1997 – Feb 8, 2017	Re-elected in 2002.	32	108th	31	Re-elected in 1998.	Jan 3, 1987 – Jan 3, 2023	Republican	Richard Shelby (Tuscaloosa)	27
16	Jeff Sessions (Mobile)	Republican	Jan 3, 1997 – Feb 8, 2017	Re-elected in 2002.	32	109th	32	Re-elected in 2004.	Jan 3, 1987 – Jan 3, 2023	Republican	Richard Shelby (Tuscaloosa)	27
16	Jeff Sessions (Mobile)	Republican	Jan 3, 1997 – Feb 8, 2017	Re-elected in 2002.	32	110th	32	Re-elected in 2004.	Jan 3, 1987 – Jan 3, 2023	Republican	Richard Shelby (Tuscaloosa)	27
16	Jeff Sessions (Mobile)	Republican	Jan 3, 1997 – Feb 8, 2017	Re-elected in 2008.	33	111th	32	Re-elected in 2004.	Jan 3, 1987 – Jan 3, 2023	Republican	Richard Shelby (Tuscaloosa)	27
16	Jeff Sessions (Mobile)	Republican	Jan 3, 1997 – Feb 8, 2017	Re-elected in 2008.	33	112th	33	Re-elected in 2010.	Jan 3, 1987 – Jan 3, 2023	Republican	Richard Shelby (Tuscaloosa)	27
16	Jeff Sessions (Mobile)	Republican	Jan 3, 1997 – Feb 8, 2017	Re-elected in 2008.	33	113th	33	Re-elected in 2010.	Jan 3, 1987 – Jan 3, 2023	Republican	Richard Shelby (Tuscaloosa)	27
16	Jeff Sessions (Mobile)	Republican	Jan 3, 1997 – Feb 8, 2017	Re-elected in 2014. Resigned to become U.S. Attorney General.	34	114th	33	Re-elected in 2010.	Jan 3, 1987 – Jan 3, 2023	Republican	Richard Shelby (Tuscaloosa)	27
16	Jeff Sessions (Mobile)	Republican	Jan 3, 1997 – Feb 8, 2017	Re-elected in 2014. Resigned to become U.S. Attorney General.	34	115th	34	Re-elected in 2016. Retired.	Jan 3, 1987 – Jan 3, 2023	Republican	Richard Shelby (Tuscaloosa)	27
17	Luther Strange (Homewood)	Republican	Feb 9, 2017 – Jan 3, 2018	Appointed to continue Sessions's term. Lost nomination to finish Sessions's term.	34	115th	34	Re-elected in 2016. Retired.	Jan 3, 1987 – Jan 3, 2023	Republican	Richard Shelby (Tuscaloosa)	27
18	Doug Jones (Birmingham)	Democratic	Jan 3, 2018 – Jan 3, 2021	Elected in 2017 to finish Sessions's term. Lost re-election.	34	115th	34	Re-elected in 2016. Retired.	Jan 3, 1987 – Jan 3, 2023	Republican	Richard Shelby (Tuscaloosa)	27
18	Doug Jones (Birmingham)	Democratic	Jan 3, 2018 – Jan 3, 2021	Elected in 2017 to finish Sessions's term. Lost re-election.	34	116th	34	Re-elected in 2016. Retired.	Jan 3, 1987 – Jan 3, 2023	Republican	Richard Shelby (Tuscaloosa)	27
19	Tommy Tuberville (Auburn)	Republican	Jan 3, 2021 – present	Elected in 2020. Retiring to run for governor of Alabama.	35	117th	34	Re-elected in 2016. Retired.	Jan 3, 1987 – Jan 3, 2023	Republican	Richard Shelby (Tuscaloosa)	27
19	Tommy Tuberville (Auburn)	Republican	Jan 3, 2021 – present	Elected in 2020. Retiring to run for governor of Alabama.	35	118th	35	Elected in 2022.	Jan 3, 2023 – present	Republican	Katie Britt (Montgomery)	28
19	Tommy Tuberville (Auburn)	Republican	Jan 3, 2021 – present	Elected in 2020. Retiring to run for governor of Alabama.	35	119th	35	Elected in 2022.	Jan 3, 2023 – present	Republican	Katie Britt (Montgomery)	28
20	Barry Moore (elect)(Enterprise)	Republican	Taking office Jan 3, 2027	Elected in 2026.	36	120th	35	Elected in 2022.	Jan 3, 2023 – present	Republican	Katie Britt (Montgomery)	28
20	Barry Moore (elect)(Enterprise)	Republican	Taking office Jan 3, 2027	Elected in 2026.	36	121st	36	To be determined in the 2028 election.				
20	Barry Moore (elect)(Enterprise)	Republican	Taking office Jan 3, 2027	Elected in 2026.	36	122nd	36	To be determined in the 2028 election.				
To be determined in the 2032 election.					37	123rd	36	To be determined in the 2028 election.				

== See also ==
- Alabama's congressional delegations
- Elections in Alabama
- List of United States representatives from Alabama
- List of United States Senate elections in Alabama
