= George R. Swift =

American politician and businessman (1887–1972)

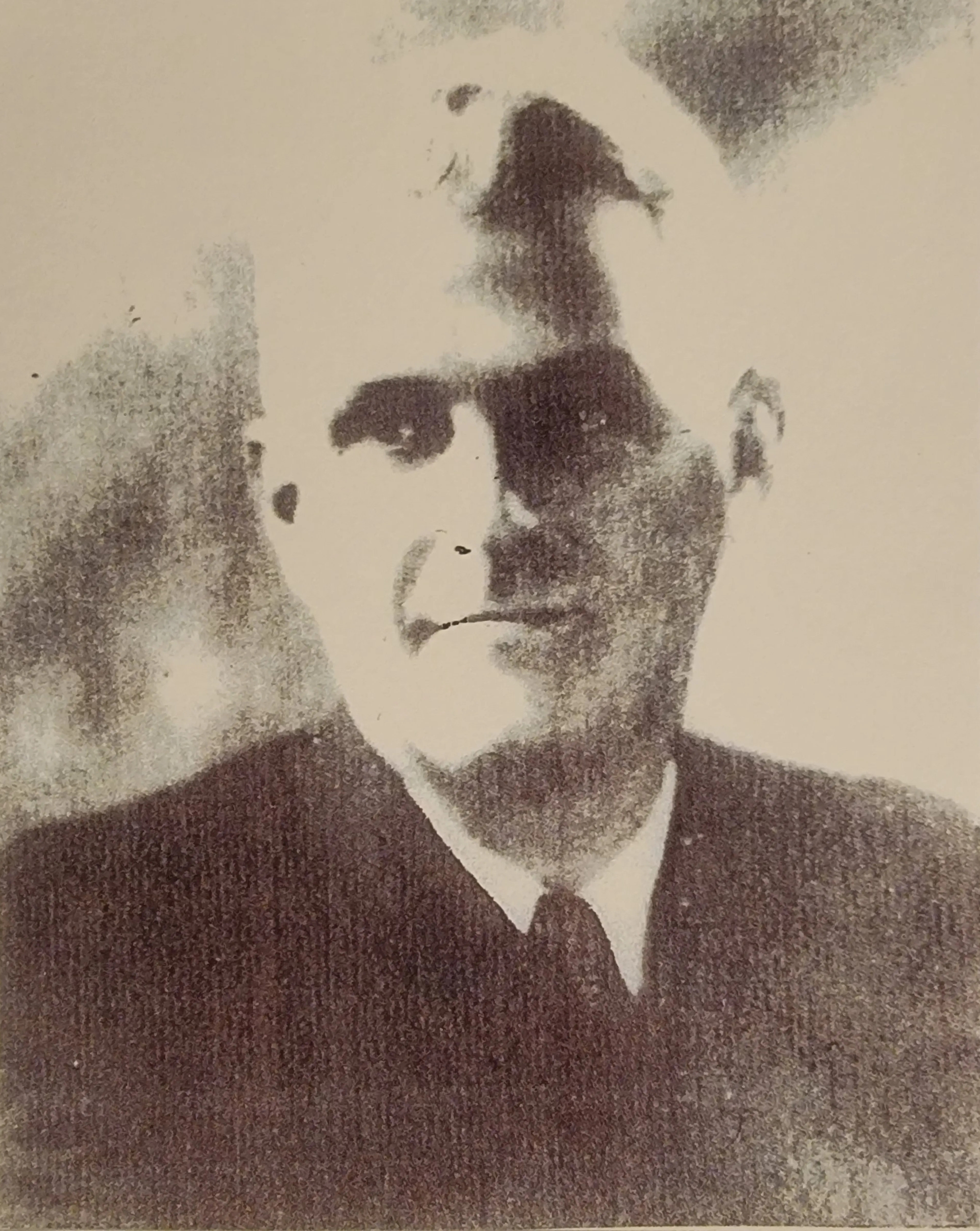
- Official portrait c. 1946

United States Senator from Alabama
- In office June 15, 1946 – November 5, 1946
- Appointed by: Chauncey Sparks
- Preceded by: John H. Bankhead II
- Succeeded by: John Sparkman

Member of the Alabama Senate
- In office 1935–1939
- In office 1947–1951

Member of the Alabama House of Representatives
- In office 1931–1935

Personal details
- Born: George Robinson Swift; December 19, 1887 Swift Post Office, Alabama, US
- Died: September 10, 1972 (aged 84) New Orleans, Louisiana, US
- Party: Democratic
- Relations: Ira P. Swift (brother)
- Occupation: Politician, businessman

George Robinson Swift Sr. (December 19, 1887 – September 10, 1972) was an American politician and businessman. A Democrat, he was a member of the United States Senate from Alabama.

== Biography ==
Swift was born on December 19, 1887, one of thirteen children born to Charles Swift and Susan Roberts Swift. He was born in Swift Post Office, a settlement in Baldwin County, Alabama which was named for his father and uncle. His younger brother was military officer Ira P. Swift.

Swift grew up in Seminole. Educated at public schools in Baldwin County, he attended the University Military School, then attended the University of Alabama for a short time before dropping out. In 1909, he joined his family in the lumber business.

Swift was a Democrat. He was a member of the Alabama House of Representatives from 1931 to 1935, and was a member of the Alabama Senate, from 1935 to 1939, and again from 1947 to 1951. He was Alabama State Highway Director from 1943 until his appointment to the United States Senate, as which he developed the road construction projects that began following World War II.

Following the death of John H. Bankhead II, he was appointed to the United States Senate, seving from June 15, to November 5, 1946. He was not a candidate for re-election. Politically, he leaned conservative, opposing price regulation and federal defense budget increases while in the Senate. He left politics due to disagreements with Governor Gordon Persons.

Through 1954 and 1955, Swift was president of the Southern Pine Association, later serving as president of the Swift-Hunter Lumber Company, in Atmore. After retiring, he lived in Atmore and worked as a bus driver for local school field trips.

Swift was married to Margherita Ligon Swift, with whom he had three children. He died on September 10, 1972, aged 84, in New Orleans, though the Encyclopedia of Alabama states he died in New York City. He was buried at Oak Hill Cemetery, in Atmore.

U.S. Senate
Preceded by John H. Bankhead II	U.S. senator (Class 2) from Alabama; 1946; Served alongside: J. Lister Hill	Succeeded by John J. Sparkman
