= Ira P. Swift =

American Army general (1898–1987)

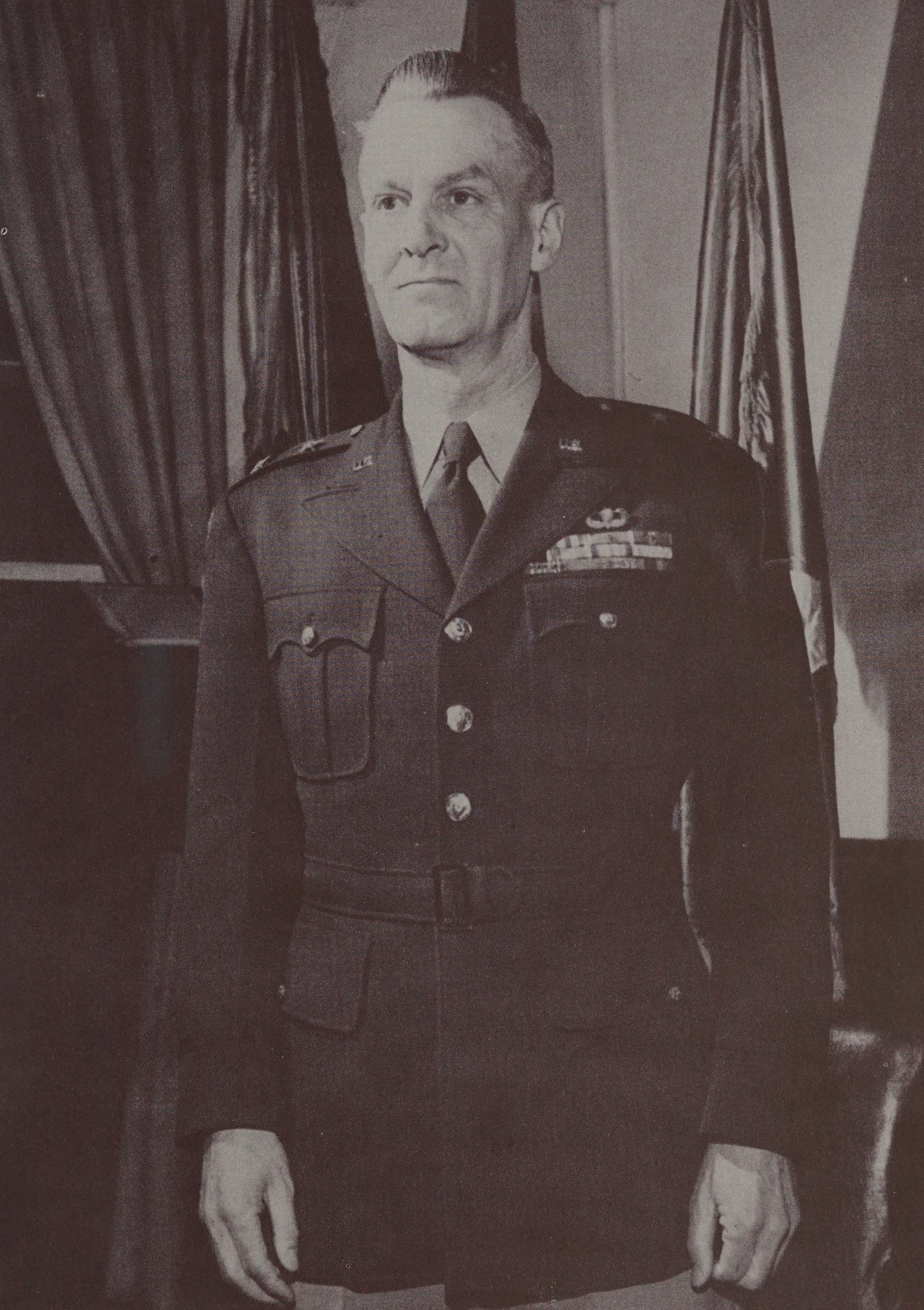
- Swift as 3rd Armored Division commander c. 1951
- Nickname: Joe
- Born: 8 February 1898; Chicora, Mississippi, U.S.
- Died: 29 July 1987 (aged 89) Winter Park, Florida, U.S.
- Allegiance: United States
- Branch: United States Army
- Service years: 1918–1954
- Rank: Major General
- Commands: V Corps; III Corps; 25th Infantry Division; 3rd Armored Division; United States Forces Austria; 2nd Infantry Division (Interim); 66th Armored Regiment, 2nd Armored Division; Combat Command A, 9th Armored Division; 14th Armored Regiment, 9th Armored Division; Troop E, 6th Cavalry
- Conflicts: World War I; World War II; Korean War
- Awards: Distinguished Service Medal; Silver Star Medal; Legion of Merit (2); Bronze Star Medal (2); Order of the Patriotic War First Class (USSR)

Ira Platt Swift (8 February 1898 – 29 July 1987) was a United States Army major general. During World War II, he served as assistant commander of the 82nd Airborne Division from December 1944 to May 1945. During the Korean War, Swift served as commanding general of the 25th Infantry Division from July 1951 to July 1952.

== Early life and education ==
Swift was born in Chicora, Wayne County, Mississippi and raised in Bon Secour, Alabama. He entered the United States Military Academy in June 1916, graduating on 1 November 1918 because of World War I. Swift was commissioned in the infantry and attended the Infantry School of Arms until February 1919. He graduated from the Cavalry School Troop Officers' Course in June 1928 and Advanced Equitation Course in June 1929. Swift graduated from the Command and General Staff School in June 1935 and the Army War College in June 1939.

== Military career ==
Swift served with the 43rd Infantry in Texas from February to June 1919. He then taught rifle marksmanship at West Point until August 1919, when he joined the 14th Cavalry in Texas. Swift formally transferred from the infantry to the cavalry in November 1919. In August 1920, he moved to Fort Des Moines, Iowa with his regiment and served there until March 1921. Swift then served in the Philippines with the 9th Cavalry from May 1921 to August 1922 and the 26th Cavalry (Philippine Scouts) from August 1922 to June 1924. After returning to the United States, he served with the 10th Cavalry at Fort Huachuca, Arizona from July 1924 to July 1927.

Swift was assigned to the Cavalry Rifle Team at Fort Riley, Kansas and Camp Perry, Ohio from June to September 1928. He taught horsemanship at the Cavalry School from June 1929 to August 1933. Swift was promoted to captain in March 1935 and given command of Troop E, 6th Cavalry at Fort Oglethorpe, Georgia from August 1935 to June 1936. He then taught tactics at West Point from June 1936 to June 1938.

Swift was assigned to the War Department operations staff in Washington, D.C. from August 1939 to January 1941. He was promoted to major in July 1940. Swift was then assigned to the Legislative Section as an assistant and then as chief from January 1941 to January 1942. He received a temporary promotion to lieutenant colonel in September 1941. Swift was chief of the planning board in the personnel division from January to March 1942. He received a second temporary promotion to colonel in February 1942.

Swift was given command of the 14th Armored Regiment, 9th Armored Division at Fort Riley from July 1942 to July 1943. His permanent rank was increased to lieutenant colonel in December 1942. Swift then served as commanding officer of Combat Command A, 9th Armored Division. Finally, he served as deputy chief of staff G-3 for the division before being sent to Europe in November 1943. There Swift was assigned first to Headquarters, First U.S. Army Group and then to Headquarters, Twelfth U.S. Army Group. In October 1944, he was given command of the 66th Armored Regiment, 2nd Armored Division in France for which he was awarded the Silver Star Medal and Bronze Star Medal. In December 1944, Swift was reassigned as assistant commander of the 82nd Airborne Division for which he earned a second Bronze Star and the Order of the Patriotic War First Class when the division came into contact with Soviet Red Army units in May 1945. He also received a temporary promotion to brigadier general in March 1945.

After the war, Swift returned to Washington, D.C. as chief of the military personnel management group at the War Department from September 1945 to April 1947. He then served as assistant commander of the 2nd Infantry Division at Fort Lewis, Washington from April 1947 to July 1948. His wartime promotion to brigadier general was made permanent in January 1948. Swift briefly served as interim division commander between the departure of Major General Paul W. Kendall in May 1948 and the arrival of Major General Harry J. Collins in June 1948. Sent to Europe in July 1948, he served as commander of United States Forces Austria from October 1948 to January 1951. His temporary promotion to major general was approved in December 1950.

In February 1951, Swift became commanding general of the 3rd Armored Division at Fort Knox, Kentucky. His assignment was cut short when he was sent to Korea to relieve Major General Joseph S. Bradley as commanding general of the 25th Infantry Division in July 1951. After supervising combat operations there, he was relieved by Major General Samuel T. Williams in July 1952 and awarded the Distinguished Service Medal.

Swift subsequently became commander of the III Corps at Fort MacArthur, California. In March 1953, his promotion to major general was made permanent and he took command of V Corps in Europe. Swift retired from active duty on 30 June 1954.

== Family and later life ==
Swift was the son of Charles Augustus "C.A." Swift and Susan Platt "Susie" (Roberts) Swift. His older brother was U.S. Senator George R. Swift.

On 20 March 1921 in Des Moines, Iowa, Swift married Gertrude Morgan Perry (13 September 1896 – 4 May 1979). She was the daughter of Howard Rand Perry (19 June 1868 – 23 April 1945), an 1893 West Point graduate who commanded a regiment in France during World War I. Her brother Howard Rand Perry Jr. (13 August 1898 – 28 January 1945) was a 1919 West Point graduate who commanded a regiment in the Philippines during World War II but died after he was wounded during an attack on his Japanese POW transport ship by Allied forces on 9 January 1945. Swift and his wife had two daughters.

After his retirement, Swift and his wife settled in Winter Park, Florida. In 1987, he died there and was interred at Arlington National Cemetery next to his wife five days later.
