= 1960 United States Senate election in Alabama =

- November 8, 1960
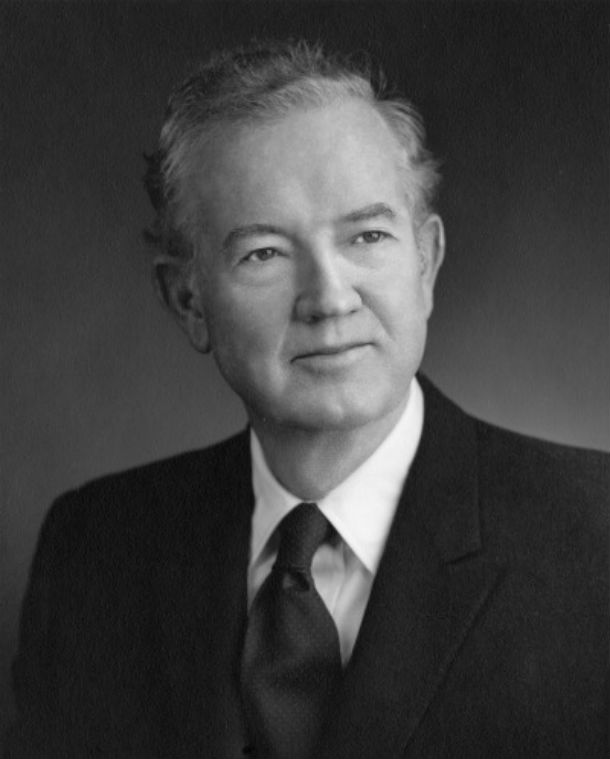

Nominee	John Sparkman	Julian Elgin
Party	Democratic	Republican
Popular vote	389,196	164,868
Percentage	70.24%	29.76%
- County results Sparkman: 50–60% 60–70% 70–80% 80–90% Elgin: 50–60% 60–70%
U.S. senator before election
John Sparkman
Democratic
Elected U.S. Senator
John Sparkman
Democratic

The 1960 United States Senate election in Alabama was held on November 8, 1960.

Incumbent Senator John Sparkman was re-elected to a third full term in office over Republican Julian Elgin.

== Democratic primary ==
=== Candidates ===
- Zeke Calhoun
- John G. Crommelin, retired U.S. Navy Rear Admiral and white supremacist
- John Sparkman, incumbent Senator

=== Results ===
1960 Democratic U.S. Senate primary
Party	Candidate	Votes	%
Democratic	John Sparkman (Incumbent)	335,722	83.08%
Democratic	John G. Crommelin	51,591	12.77%
Democratic	Zeke Calhoun	16,792	4.16%
Total votes		404,105	100.00%

== General election ==
=== Results ===
General election results
Party	Candidate	Votes	%	±%
Democratic	John Sparkman (Incumbent)	389,196	70.24%	▼12.23
Republican	Julian Elgin	164,868	29.76%	▲12.23
Write-in	All others	8	0.00%	N/A
Total votes		554,072	100.00%	

== See also ==
- 1960 United States Senate elections
