= 1942 United States Senate election in Alabama =

- November 3, 1942
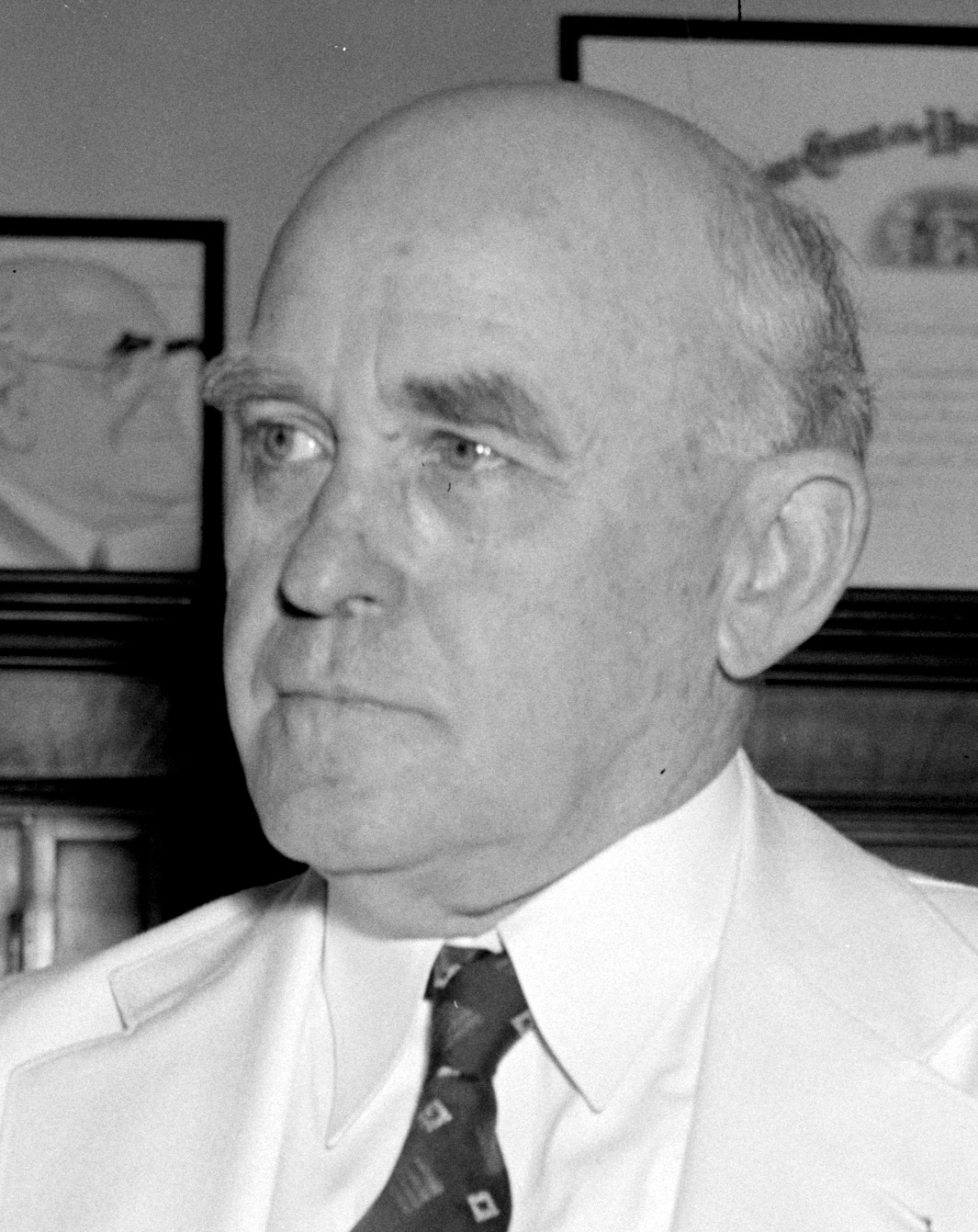
Nominee	John H. Bankhead II
Party	Democratic
Popular vote	69,212
Percentage	100.0%
- County results Bankhead: 100%
U.S. senator before election
John H. Bankhead II
Democratic
Elected U.S. Senator
John H. Bankhead II
Democratic

The 1942 United States Senate election in Alabama was held on November 3, 1942.

Incumbent two term Senator John H. Bankhead II won re-election to a third term unopposed. However, Bankhead would not complete his term as he died on June 12, 1946.

== Results ==
1942 United States Senate election in Alabama
Party	Candidate	Votes	%
Democratic	John H. Bankhead II (Incumbent)	69,212	100.00%
Democratic hold			
