= 1938 United States Senate election in Alabama =

1938 United States Senate Election in Alabama
- November 8, 1938
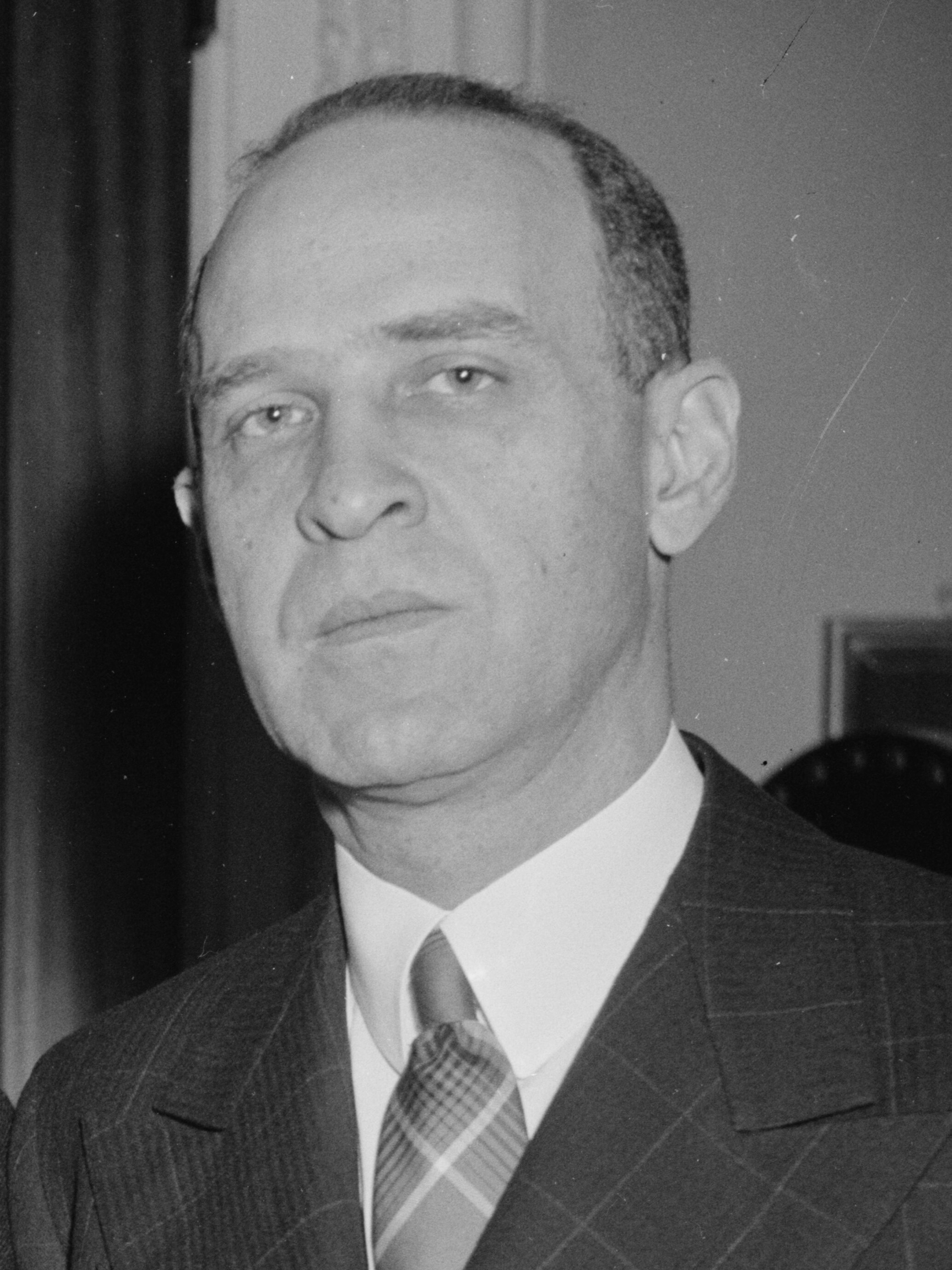

Nominee	Lister Hill	J. M. Pennington
Party	Democratic	Republican
Popular vote	113,413	17,885
Percentage	86.38%	13.62%
- County results Hill: 50–60% 60–70% 70–80% 80–90% 90–100% Heflin: 50–60%
U.S. senator before election
J. Lister Hill
Democratic
Elected U.S. Senator
J. Lister Hill
Democratic

Incumbent U.S. Senator, J. Lister Hill won re-election to a full term after winning a special election earlier in 1938. He easily defeated his Republican opponent with 86.38% of the votes cast. This was typical for the Democratic Party stronghold of Alabama at the time.

== Results ==
Alabama election
Party	Candidate	Votes	%
Democratic	J. Lister Hill (Incumbent)	113,413	86.38%
Republican	J. M. Pennington	17,885	13.62%
None	Scattering	1	0.00%
Turnout		131,299	4.96%
