= 1930 United States Senate election in Alabama =

- November 4, 1930
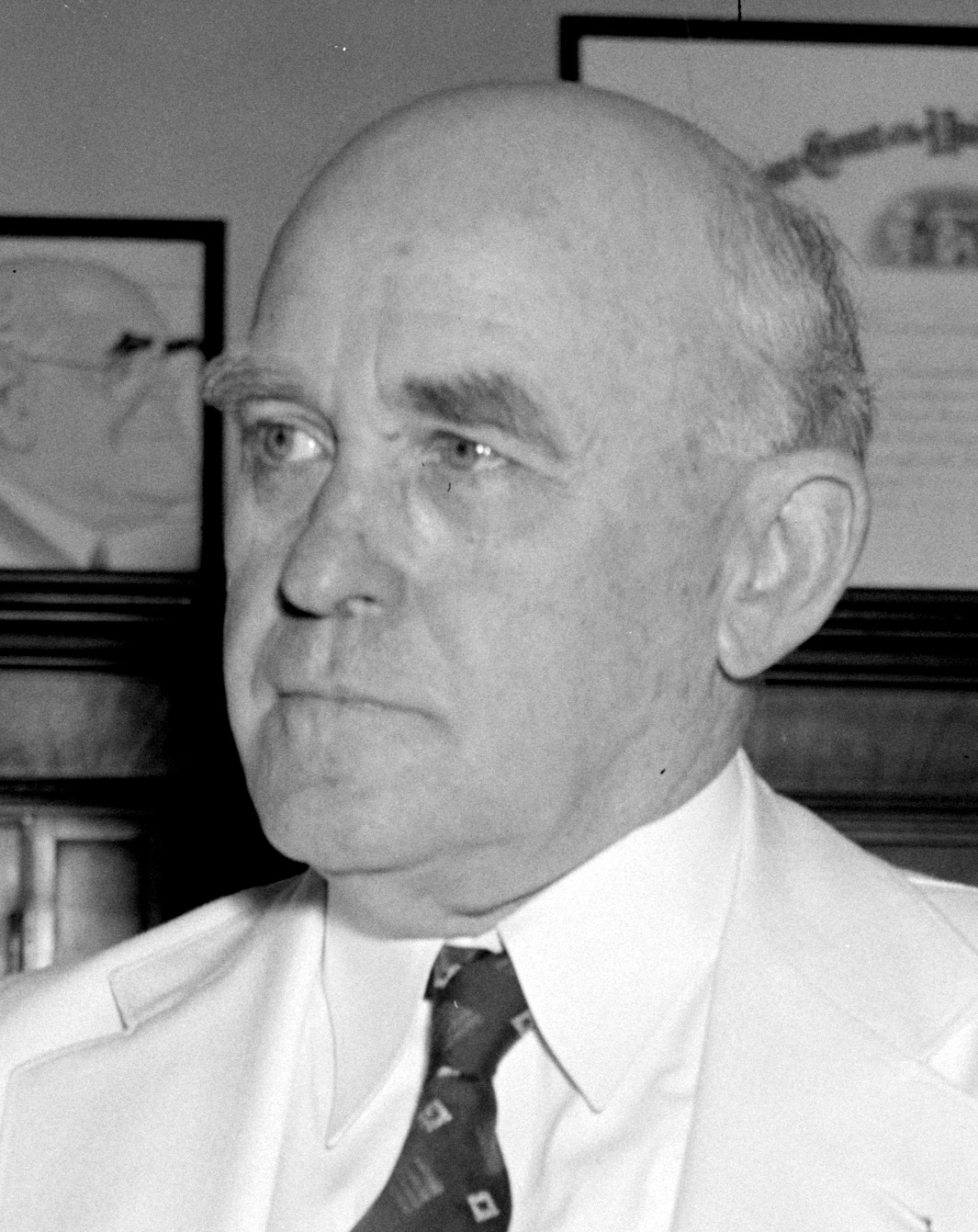

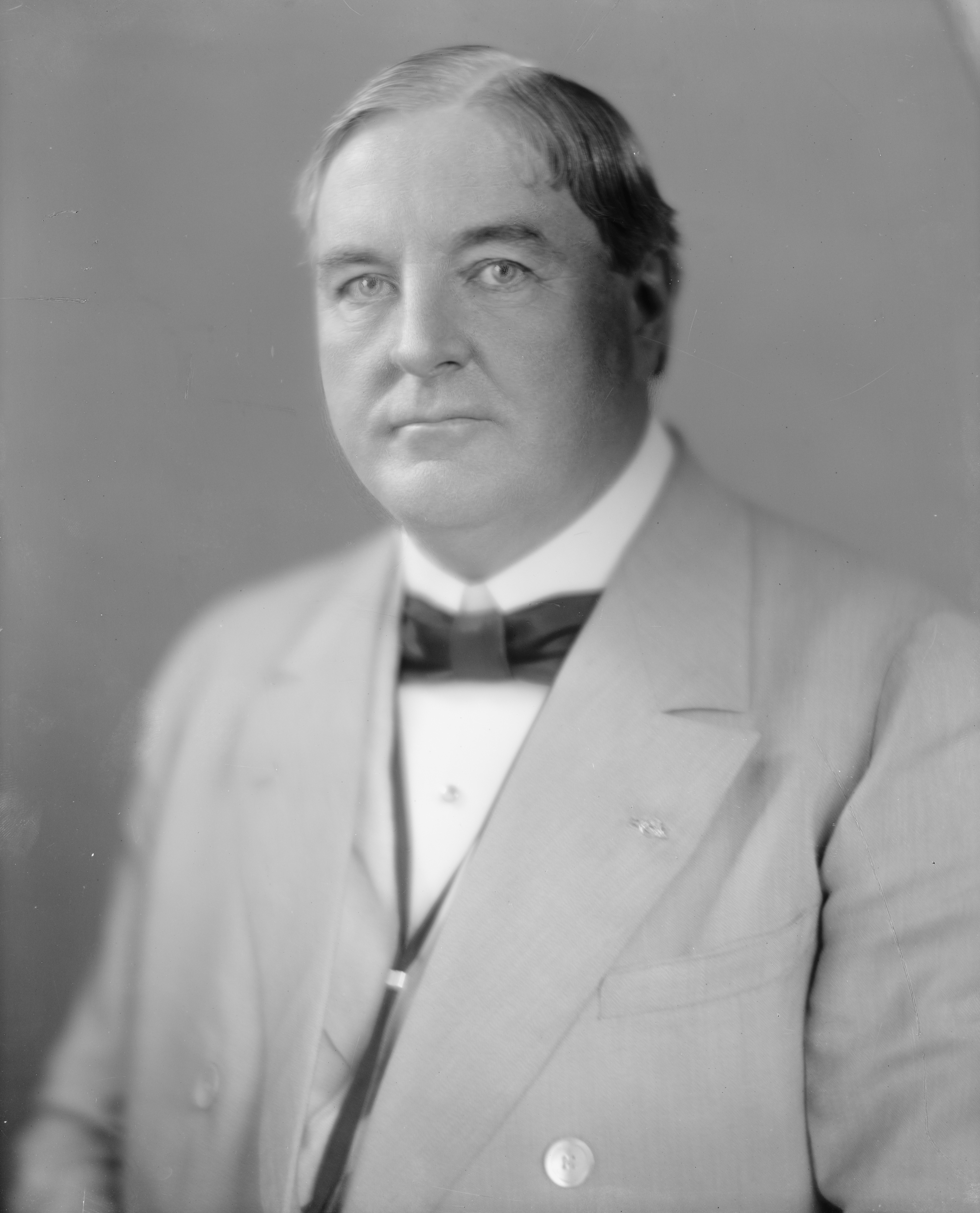
| Candidate | John H. Bankhead II | J. Thomas Heflin |
| Party | Democratic | Jeffersonian "Independent Body" |
| Popular vote | 150,985 | 100,952 |
| Percentage | 59.93% | 40.07% |
- County results Bankhead: 50–60% 60–70% 70–80% 80–90% >90% Heflin: 50–60% 60–70%
U.S. senator before election
James Thomas Heflin
Democratic
Elected U.S. Senator
John H. Bankhead II
Democratic

The 1930 United States Senate election in Alabama was held on November 4, 1930. Incumbent U.S. Senator James Thomas Heflin was denied the Democratic nomination for supporting Republican Herbert Hoover in 1928. Heflin decided to seek re-election as an independent candidate. Supporters of Heflin called themselves "Jeffersonians", and held a primary election independent of the state Democratic primaries on August 5, which by Heflin's own estimations, between 40,000 and 60,000 voters participated in. Heflin was listed on the ballot under the "Independent Body" column. The election symbol of the Body was a Liberty Bell featuring the slogans "White Control" and "Down With The Rule of the '27'," referencing the twenty-seven members of the state Democratic executive committee who barred Heflin from running in the Democratic primary. Heflin lost re-election to John H. Bankhead II.

== Democratic primary ==
=== Candidates ===
- John H. Bankhead II, businessman and candidate for Senate in 1926
- Fred I. Thompson

=== Results ===
Democratic primary results by county Bankhead: 50–60%; 60–70%; 70–80%; 80–90%; Thompson: 50–60%; 60–70%

1930 U.S. Senate election in Alabama: Democratic primary
| Party | Candidate | Votes | % |
|---|---|---|---|
| Democratic | John H. Bankhead II | 102,462 | 63.93% |
| Democratic | Fred I. Thompson | 57,809 | 36.07% |
| Total votes | | 160,271 | 100.00% |

== General election ==
=== Results ===
1930 U.S. Senate election in Alabama
| Party | Candidate | Votes | % | ±% |
|---|---|---|---|---|
| Democratic | John H. Bankhead II | 150,985 | 59.93% | |
| Independent Body | James Thomas Heflin (inc.) | 100,952 | 40.07% | |
| Total votes | | 251,947 | 100.00% | |

== See also ==
- 1930 United States Senate elections
