= 1924 United States Senate election in Alabama =

- November 4, 1924
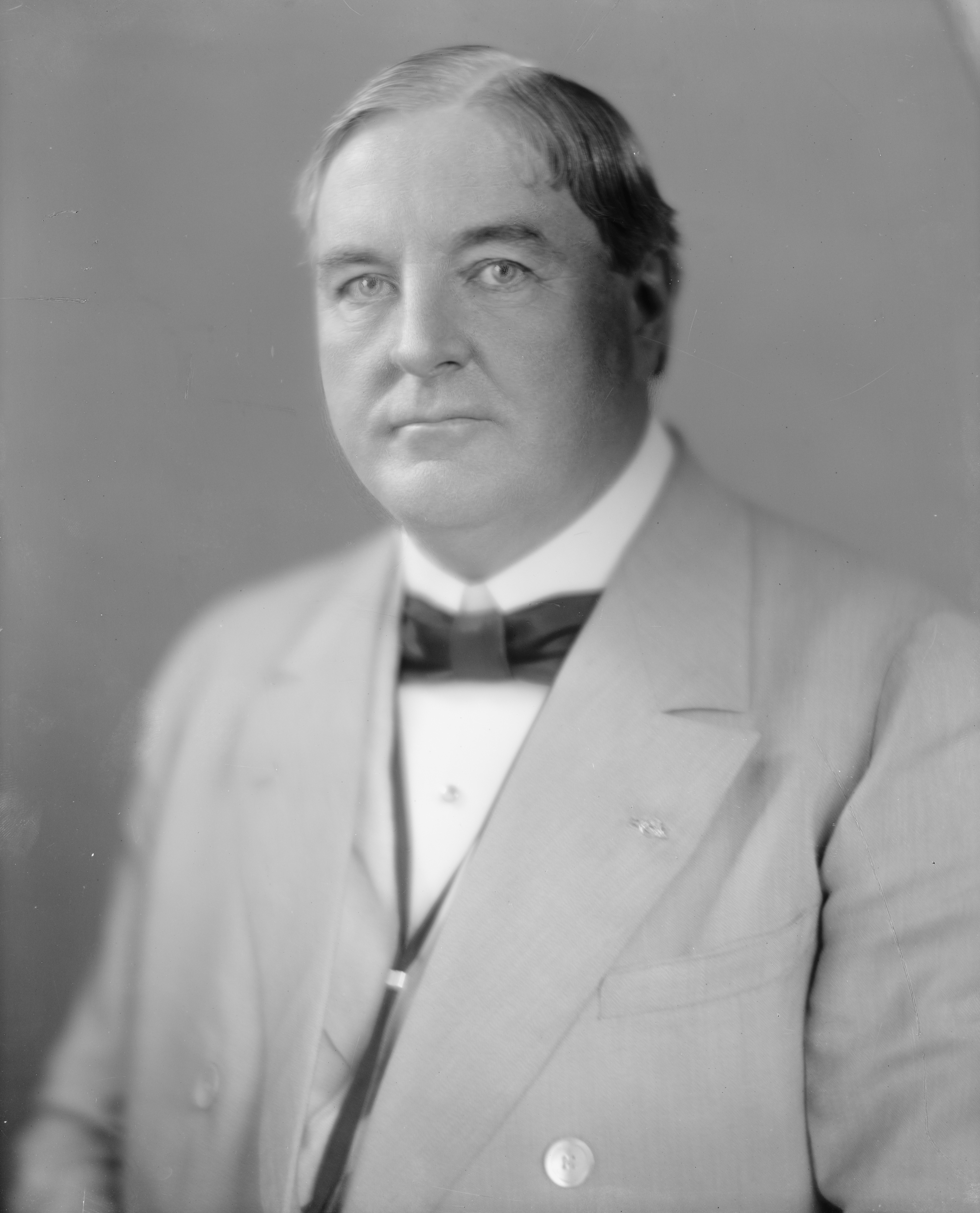

Candidate	James Thomas Heflin	Frank H. Lathrop
Party	Democratic	Republican
Popular vote	120,017	39,623
Percentage	75.18%	24.82%
- County results Heflin: 50–60% 60–70% 70–80% 80–90% >90% Lathrop: 50–60% 60–70% No Vote
U.S. senator before election
James Thomas Heflin
Democratic
Elected U.S. Senator
James Thomas Heflin
Democratic

The 1924 United States Senate election in Alabama was held on November 4, 1924.

Incumbent U.S. Senator James Thomas Heflin, who had been elected to complete the unfinished term of John H. Bankhead in 1920, was elected to a full term in office over Republican Frank J. Lathrop.

== General election ==
=== Candidates ===
- James Thomas Heflin, incumbent Senator since 1920 (Democratic)
- Frank H. Lathrop (Republican)

=== Results ===
1924 U.S. Senate election in Alabama
Party	Candidate	Votes	%	±%
Democratic	James Thomas Heflin (inc.)	120,017	75.18%	▲5.91
Republican	Frank H. Lathrop	39,623	24.82%	▼4.69
Total votes		159,640	100.00%	

== See also ==
- 1924 United States Senate elections
