= 1936 United States Senate election in Alabama =

- November 2, 1936
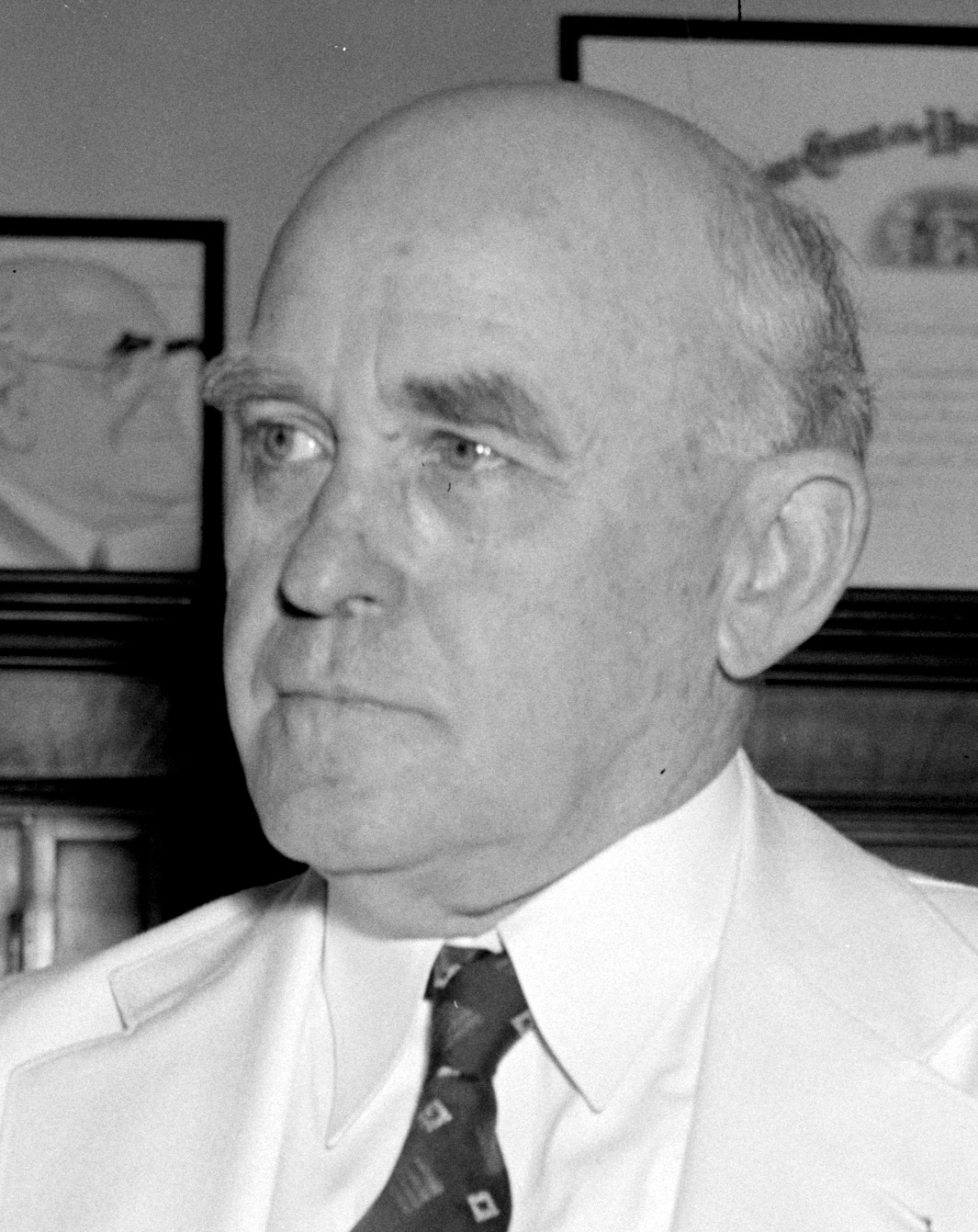

Nominee	John H. Bankhead II	H. E. Berkstresser
Party	Democratic	Republican
Popular vote	239,632	33,698
Percentage	87.03%	12.24%
- County results Bankhead: 50–60% 60–70% 70–80% 80–90% >90% Berkstresser: 50–60%
U.S. senator before election
John H. Bankhead II
Democratic
Elected U.S. Senator
John H. Bankhead II
Democratic

The 1936 United States Senate election in Alabama was held on November 2, 1936.

Senator John H. Bankhead II was re-elected to a second term in office over Republican H. E. Berkstresser.

== Democratic primary ==
=== Candidates ===
- H.L. Anderton, candidate for Senate in 1932
- John H. Bankhead II, incumbent Senator

=== Results ===
1936 Democratic U.S. Senate primary
Party	Candidate	Votes	%
Democratic	John H. Bankhead II (inc.)	178,500	81.07%
Democratic	H.L. Anderton	41,673	18.93%
Total votes		310,929	100.00%

== General election ==
=== Results ===
General election results
Party	Candidate	Votes	%	±%
Democratic	John H. Bankhead II (inc.)	239,632	87.03%	▲12.24
Republican	H. E. Berkstresser	33,698	12.24%	N/A
Union	William C. Irby	2,022	0.73%	N/A
Total votes		275,352	100.00%	

== See also ==
- 1936 United States Senate elections
