= John H. Bankhead II =

American politician (1872–1946)

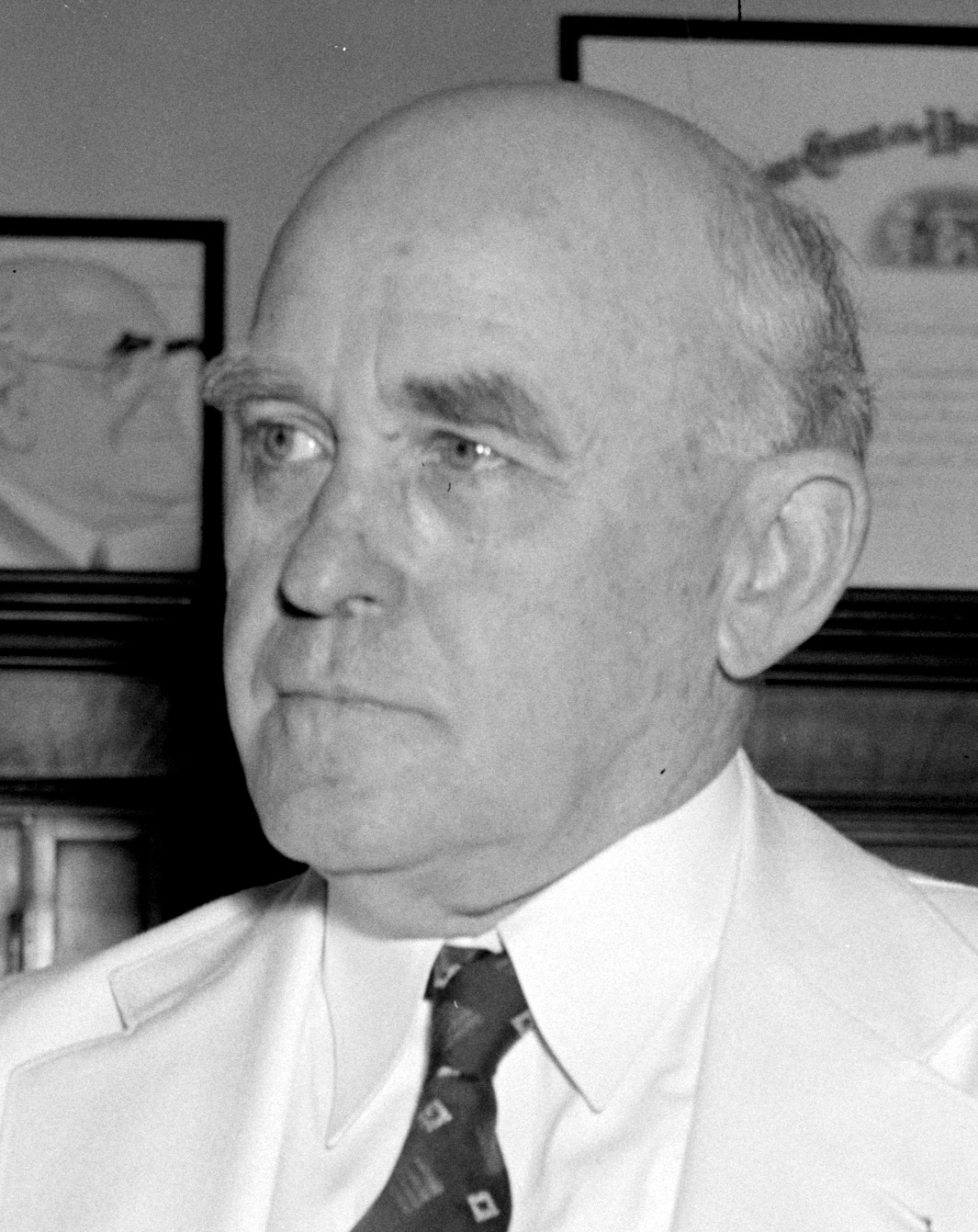

United States Senator from Alabama
- In office March 4, 1931 – June 12, 1946
- Preceded by: J. Thomas Heflin
- Succeeded by: George R. Swift

Personal details
- Born: John Hollis Bankhead II; July 8, 1872 near Old Moscow, Lamar County, Alabama, U.S.
- Died: June 12, 1946 (aged 73) United States Naval Hospital, Bethesda, Maryland, U.S.
- Party: Democratic
- Spouse: Musa Bernice Harkins
- Children: 3, including Walter
- Parent: John H. Bankhead (father)
- Relatives: William B. Bankhead (brother); Tallulah Bankhead (niece)
- Education: University of Alabama; Georgetown University

Military service
- Branch/service: United States National Guard
- Years of service: 1901–1903
- Rank: Major
- Unit: Alabama

John Hollis Bankhead II (July 8, 1872 – June 12, 1946) was a U.S. senator from the state of Alabama. Like his father, John H. Bankhead, he was elected three times to the Senate, and like his father, he died in office.

He served in the Senate from March 4, 1931, to his death on June 12, 1946. He was first elected to the Senate in 1930 by defeating J. Thomas Heflin, the man who succeeded his father. Though Bankhead won the election by 20 points, Heflin challenged the results for over a year. He served as chairman of the Committee on Irrigation and Reclamation. After his death, Bankhead was succeeded by George R. Swift, who was appointed to fill his seat until a successor, John J. Sparkman, could be elected. Bankhead is remembered as a spokesman for farmers and against civil rights for African Americans.

== Life and career ==
Bankhead was born on July 8, 1872, at the Bankhead plantation in Lamar County, Alabama, the son of Tallulah James Brockman and John Hollis Bankhead. After earning his law degree in 1893 and practicing law for ten years with his brother William, Bankhead was elected to the Alabama House of Representatives in 1903. After Alabama's grandfather clause, which disenfranchised most black voters, was declared unconstitutional, Bankhead was one of the drafters of Alabama's revised voting law effectively preventing most black voters from registering via a series of tests and poll taxes.

Following his controversial win over Heflin in 1930, the Senator from Alabama worked at the passage of various pieces of New Deal legislation to benefit cotton farmers, including the Subsistence Homestead Act of 1933, the Cotton Control Act of 1934 and the parity payment amendments to the Agricultural Adjustment Act of 1938. After World War II began in Europe, Bankhead was an interventionist. He took a "pro-British" stance and favored President Franklin Roosevelt's Lend-Lease program. On October 23, 1941, Bankhead voted in favor of additional lend-lease funding to provide more funding to the British Army. On November 7, 1941, he voted in favor of legislation to amend several sections of the neutrality acts. This vote made it easier for the United States to provide direct military aid to the United Kingdom during World War II. In 1943, he sponsored legislation to exempt "substantially fulltime" farm workers from the draft during World War II. Bankhead was among twelve nominated at the 1944 Democratic National Convention to serve as Franklin D. Roosevelt's running mate in the presidential election that year. He was in third place, with 98 votes, when Bankhead made a surprise withdrawal of his candidacy in favor of his Senate colleague, Harry S. Truman, who was elected vice president and succeeded to the presidency in 1945.

On May 24, 1946, Senator Bankhead suffered a stroke while attending an evening Senate committee meeting. Three weeks later, he died at the U.S. Naval Hospital in Bethesda, Maryland. He was the brother of Speaker of the House William B. Bankhead, and the uncle of actress Tallulah Bankhead.

== See also ==
- List of members of the United States Congress who died in office (1900–1949)

Party political offices
Preceded by James Thomas Heflin	Democratic nominee for U.S. Senator from Alabama (Class 2); 1930, 1936, 1942	Succeeded by John Sparkman
U.S. Senate
Preceded by J. Thomas Heflin	U.S. senator (Class 2) from Alabama; 1931–1946; Served alongside: Hugo Black, Dixie Bibb Graves, J. Lister Hill	Succeeded by George R. Swift
