= 1974 United States Senate election in Alabama =

1974 Democratic Senate primary election in Alabama
- August 6, 1974
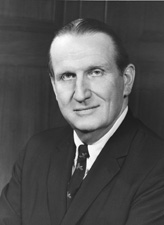

Nominee	James B. Allen	John Taylor
Party	Democratic	Democratic
Popular vote	572,584	118,848
Percentage	82.81%	17.19%
- County results Allen: 60–70% 70–80% 80–90% >90%

The 1974 United States Senate election in Alabama took place on November 5, 1974. Incumbent Democratic U.S. Senator James B. Allen ran for re-election to a second term in office and succeeded easily, with only nominal opposition in the Democratic primary and general election.

With no Republican opponent, the Democratic primary on August 6 was tantamount to election.

== Democratic primary ==
=== Candidates ===
- James B. Allen, incumbent U.S. senator
- John Taylor, Double Springs businessman

=== Results ===
1974 Democratic primary results
Party	Candidate	Votes	%
Democratic	James B. Allen (incumbent)	572,584	82.81%
Democratic	John Taylor	118,848	17.19%
Total votes		691,432	100.00%

== General election ==
1974 United States Senate election in Alabama
Party	Candidate	Votes	%	±%
Democratic	James B. Allen (incumbent)	501,541	95.84%	▲25.85
Prohibition	Alvin Abercrombie	21,749	4.16%	N/A
Total votes		523,290	100.00%	
Democratic hold		Swing		

== See also ==
- 1974 United States Senate elections
