= 1966 Alabama gubernatorial election =

- November 8, 1966
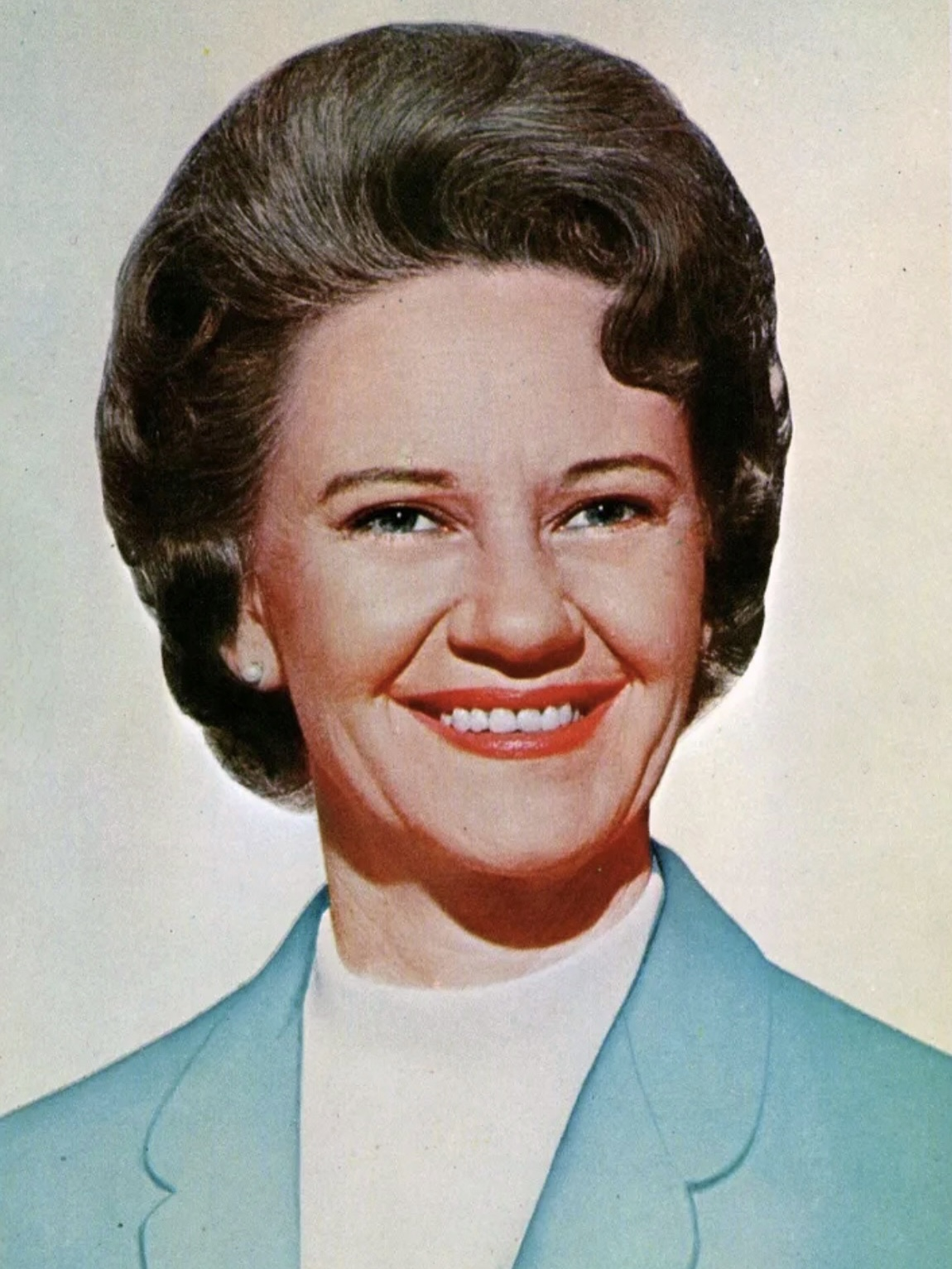

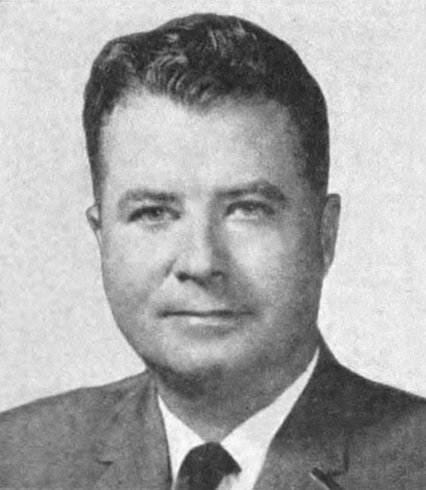

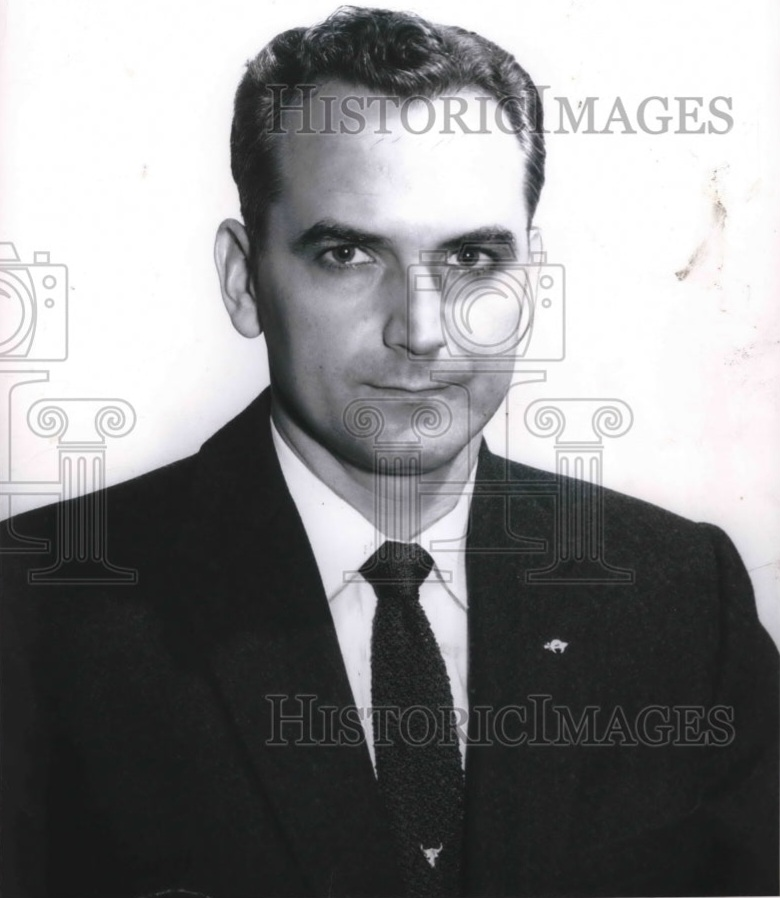
| Nominee | Lurleen Wallace | James D. Martin | Carl Robinson |
| Party | Democratic | Republican | Independent |
| Popular vote | 537,505 | 262,943 | 47,653 |
| Percentage | 63.38% | 31.00% | 5.62% |
- County results L. Wallace: 40–50% 50–60% 60–70% 70–80% 80–90% Martin: 40–50% 50–60%
Governor before election
George Wallace
Democratic
Elected Governor
Lurleen Wallace
Democratic

The 1966 Alabama gubernatorial election took place on November 8, 1966, and resulted in the election of Democratic candidate Lurleen Wallace as the governor over Republican James D. Martin. Incumbent Democrat George Wallace was term limited and could not seek a second consecutive term; he later successfully ran again in 1970 and 1974 before being term-limited again, and then successfully ran again in 1982.

== Democratic primary ==
The Democratic primary field included two former governors, John Malcolm Patterson and Jim Folsom, former congressman Carl Elliott of Jasper, Attorney General Richmond Flowers, Sr., and the incumbent's wife Lurleen Wallace who ran as "Mrs. George C. Wallace." The Democratic primary was handily won by Lurleen Wallace, who was running as a proxy for her husband, governor George Wallace. Wallace captured a majority of the vote cast in the first round of the primary and no runoff was necessary.

=== Candidates ===
Democratic primary results by county Wallace: 30–40% 40–50% 50–60% 60–70% 70–80% 80–90% Flowers: 40–50% 50–60%

- Carl Elliott, former U.S. Representative
- Richmond Flowers, Sr., Attorney General
- Jim Folsom, former Governor
- Bob Gilchrist, State Senator
- Eunice Gore
- John Malcolm Patterson, former Governor
- Sherman Powell
- A.W. Todd, Commissioner of Agriculture and Industries
- Lurleen Wallace, First Lady
- Charles Woods, businessman

Democratic primary results
| Party | Candidate | Votes | % |
|---|---|---|---|
| Democratic | Lurleen Wallace | 480,841 | 54.10 |
| Democratic | Richmond Flowers, Sr. | 172,386 | 19.40 |
| Democratic | Carl Elliott | 71,792 | 8.10 |
| Democratic | Bob Gilchrist | 49,502 | 5.57 |
| Democratic | Charles Woods | 41,148 | 4.63 |
| Democratic | John Malcolm Patterson | 31,011 | 3.49 |
| Democratic | Jim Folsom | 24,145 | 2.72 |
| Democratic | A.W. Todd | 9,013 | 1.01 |
| Democratic | Sherman Powell | 7,231 | 0.81 |
| Democratic | Eunice Gore | 1,589 | 0.18 |
| Total votes | | 888,658 | 100.00 |

== General election ==
Lurleen Wallace faced Republican U.S. representative James D. Martin of Gadsden, who had received national attention four years earlier when he mounted a serious challenge to U.S. senator J. Lister Hill.

=== Republican campaign ===
Though no Republican had served as governor of Alabama since David Peter Lewis vacated the office in 1874, Martin's Republican campaign appeared strong. The New York Times predicted that Martin "not only has a chance to win the governorship, but at least for the moment must be rated as the favorite." Political writer Theodore H. White incorrectly predicted that Alabama, instead of Arkansas and Florida as it developed, would in 1966 become the first former Confederate state to elect a Republican governor. Martin was expected to cause Republican wins in down-ballot elections though there was no GOP nominee for lieutenant governor. The idea was reinforced by three legislators and a Democratic State Executive Committee member who defected to the GOP. The New York Times said Alabama Democrats had diverged from the national Democratic Party so much and for so long that the party was no longer popular.

Jim Martin bemoaned having to campaign against a woman and proclaimed that Wallace was a "proxy" candidate, a manifestation of her husband's "insatiable appetite for power." He declared the South must "break away from the one-party system just as we broke away from a one-crop economy" and vowed to make Alabama "first in opportunity, jobs, and education." Martin focused on U.S. President Lyndon B. Johnson, unpopular with many in Alabama because of the Vietnam War, inflation, and urban unrest. "We want to see this war ended, and it's going to take a change of administration to do it", Martin said. At the state level, Martin questioned a $500,000 school book depository contract awarded to Wallace supporter Elton B. Stephens of Ebsco Investment Company, as well as "secret deals" regarding the construction of highways or schools" and "conspiracies between the state house and the White House."

U.S. senator Strom Thurmond and former U.S. senator Barry Goldwater, the 1964 Republican presidential nominee, campaigned on behalf of Martin and GOP Senate nominee John Grenier of Birmingham. Thurmond, who had carried Alabama in 1948 as the nominee of the Dixiecrats, addressed an all-white GOP state convention, where he denounced the national Democratic leadership as "the most dangerous people in the country" and urged a "return to constitutional government." George Wallace was so irritated over Goldwater's appearance on Martin's behalf that he questioned why Goldwater could win only six states in the 1964 race against President Johnson. "Where were the Republicans when I was fighting LBJ?" Wallace asked. Goldwater shunned personal criticism of Wallace but repudiated Wallace's talk of a third party in the 1968 presidential election.

=== Democratic campaign ===
Lurleen Wallace was instructed to run by her husband George Wallace, who had failed to lift the Alabama Constitution's ban on consecutive gubernatorial terms and intended to serve as de facto leader while his wife occupied the governor seat. Amid the campaign, Lurleen underwent radiation therapy and multiple surgeries for her cancer, regularly traveling to the M. D. Anderson Cancer Center in Houston due to Alabama's lack of adequate cancer treatment facilities. Though her husband knew of her diagnosis as early as 1961, she was not made aware until she went to the gynecologist for abdominal bleeding in 1965. She underwent radiation in December 1965 and had a hysterectomy in January 1966, subsequently beginning the gubernatorial campaign.

At her general election campaign kickoff in Birmingham, Lurleen Wallace pledged "progress without compromise" and "accomplishment without surrender ... George will continue to speak up and stand up for Alabama." It was during this 1966 campaign that George Wallace coined his famous line: "There's not a dime's worth of difference" between the two national parties." Wallace likened Republicans like House Minority Leader Gerald Ford and Chief Justice Earl Warren, who supported civil rights legislation, to "vultures" presiding over the destruction of the U.S. Constitution. Lurleen Wallace used the slogan "Two Governors, One Cause" and proclaimed the words Alabama and freedom to be synonyms.

=== Results ===
George Wallace's organization proved insurmountable despite an early poll that placed Martin within range of victory. Lurleen Wallace carried all Alabama counties except for Greene in west Alabama, which she lost by six votes, and predominantly Republican Winston in the north. She drew 537,505 votes (63.4 percent). Martin trailed with 262,943 votes (31 percent). A third candidate running to the political left of the major candidates, Dr. Carl Robinson, received 47,655 (5.6 percent). Martin had the best by showing of a Republican candidate for governor in Alabama since Reconstruction.

At Lurleen Wallace's January 1967 inauguration, she stated that her husband would be her "number one assistant".

1966 Alabama gubernatorial election
| Party | Candidate | Votes | % | ±% |
|---|---|---|---|---|
| Democratic | Lurleen Burns Wallace | 537,505 | 63.38 | −32.89% |
| Republican | James D. Martin | 262,943 | 31.00 | N/A |
| Independent | Carl Robinson | 47,653 | 5.62 | N/A |
| Majority | | 274,562 | 32.38 | |
| Turnout | | 848,101 | | |
| Democratic hold | | | | |

==== Results by county ====
| County | Lurleen Burns Wallace Democratic | | James Douglas Martin Republican | | Dr. Carl Robinson Independent | | Margin | | Total votes cast |
| County | # | % | # | % | # | % | # | % | Total votes cast |
|---|---|---|---|---|---|---|---|---|---|
| Autauga | 4,664 | 70.87% | 1,660 | 25.22% | 257 | 3.91% | 3,004 | 45.65% | 6,581 |
| Baldwin | 10,601 | 72.53% | 3,712 | 25.40% | 304 | 2.08% | 6,889 | 47.13% | 14,617 |
| Barbour | 5,925 | 88.57% | 649 | 9.70% | 116 | 1.73% | 5,276 | 78.86% | 6,690 |
| Bibb | 3,534 | 78.99% | 790 | 17.66% | 150 | 3.35% | 2,744 | 61.33% | 4,474 |
| Blount | 4,974 | 58.09% | 3,398 | 39.69% | 190 | 2.22% | 1,576 | 18.41% | 8,562 |
| Bullock | 2,204 | 66.47% | 1,012 | 30.52% | 100 | 3.02% | 1,192 | 35.95% | 3,316 |
| Butler | 5,131 | 76.71% | 1,259 | 18.82% | 299 | 4.47% | 3,872 | 57.89% | 6,689 |
| Calhoun | 13,621 | 63.47% | 5,908 | 27.53% | 1,933 | 9.01% | 7,713 | 35.94% | 21,462 |
| Chambers | 6,237 | 72.06% | 2,321 | 26.82% | 97 | 1.12% | 3,916 | 45.25% | 8,655 |
| Cherokee | 3,442 | 80.53% | 749 | 17.52% | 83 | 1.94% | 2,693 | 63.01% | 4,274 |
| Chilton | 5,051 | 61.85% | 2,949 | 36.11% | 167 | 2.04% | 2,102 | 25.74% | 8,167 |
| Choctaw | 4,064 | 70.42% | 1,638 | 28.38% | 69 | 1.20% | 2,426 | 42.04% | 5,771 |
| Clarke | 5,484 | 81.85% | 976 | 14.57% | 240 | 3.58% | 4,508 | 67.28% | 6,700 |
| Clay | 3,226 | 67.72% | 1,467 | 30.79% | 71 | 1.49% | 1,759 | 36.92% | 4,764 |
| Cleburne | 2,907 | 75.33% | 919 | 23.81% | 33 | 0.86% | 1,988 | 51.52% | 3,859 |
| Coffee | 6,468 | 83.81% | 1,066 | 13.81% | 183 | 2.37% | 5,402 | 70.00% | 7,717 |
| Colbert | 9,457 | 66.28% | 4,097 | 28.71% | 715 | 5.01% | 5,360 | 37.56% | 14,269 |
| Conecuh | 3,719 | 83.14% | 686 | 15.34% | 68 | 1.52% | 3,033 | 67.81% | 4,473 |
| Coosa | 2,117 | 65.58% | 805 | 24.94% | 306 | 9.48% | 1,312 | 40.64% | 3,228 |
| Covington | 9,601 | 81.00% | 1,980 | 16.70% | 272 | 2.29% | 7,621 | 64.30% | 11,853 |
| Crenshaw | 3,953 | 82.15% | 778 | 16.17% | 81 | 1.68% | 3,175 | 65.98% | 4,812 |
| Cullman | 7,981 | 50.32% | 7,438 | 46.89% | 443 | 2.79% | 543 | 3.42% | 15,862 |
| Dale | 6,007 | 82.71% | 1,125 | 15.49% | 131 | 1.80% | 4,882 | 67.22% | 7,263 |
| Dallas | 11,388 | 74.70% | 2,326 | 15.26% | 1,531 | 10.04% | 9,062 | 59.44% | 15,245 |
| DeKalb | 8,091 | 53.75% | 6,777 | 45.02% | 185 | 1.23% | 1,314 | 8.73% | 15,053 |
| Elmore | 7,301 | 76.19% | 1,963 | 20.48% | 319 | 3.33% | 5,338 | 55.70% | 9,583 |
| Escambia | 7,307 | 80.19% | 1,523 | 16.71% | 282 | 3.09% | 5,784 | 63.48% | 9,112 |
| Etowah | 13,849 | 55.44% | 9,549 | 38.23% | 1,580 | 6.33% | 4,300 | 17.22% | 24,978 |
| Fayette | 3,221 | 65.20% | 1,587 | 32.13% | 132 | 2.67% | 1,634 | 33.08% | 4,940 |
| Franklin | 4,629 | 53.07% | 3,741 | 42.89% | 352 | 4.04% | 888 | 10.18% | 8,722 |
| Geneva | 6,620 | 87.29% | 852 | 11.23% | 112 | 1.48% | 5,768 | 76.05% | 7,584 |
| Greene | 1,359 | 48.09% | 1,365 | 48.30% | 102 | 3.61% | -6 | -0.21% | 2,826 |
| Hale | 2,957 | 63.47% | 1,400 | 30.05% | 302 | 6.48% | 1,557 | 33.42% | 4,659 |
| Henry | 3,799 | 85.51% | 472 | 10.62% | 172 | 3.87% | 3,327 | 74.88% | 4,443 |
| Houston | 12,015 | 80.59% | 2,202 | 14.77% | 691 | 4.64% | 9,813 | 65.82% | 14,908 |
| Jackson | 6,259 | 77.89% | 1,668 | 20.76% | 109 | 1.36% | 4,591 | 57.13% | 8,036 |
| Jefferson | 80,658 | 50.69% | 64,290 | 40.40% | 14,177 | 8.91% | 16,368 | 10.29% | 159,125 |
| Lamar | 3,951 | 85.65% | 564 | 12.23% | 98 | 2.12% | 3,387 | 73.42% | 4,613 |
| Lauderdale | 9,662 | 63.41% | 4,579 | 30.05% | 997 | 6.54% | 5,083 | 33.36% | 15,238 |
| Lawrence | 5,152 | 76.01% | 1,461 | 21.56% | 165 | 2.43% | 3,691 | 54.46% | 6,778 |
| Lee | 6,214 | 64.78% | 2,898 | 30.21% | 480 | 5.00% | 3,316 | 34.57% | 9,592 |
| Limestone | 5,823 | 76.30% | 1,544 | 20.23% | 265 | 3.47% | 4,279 | 56.07% | 7,632 |
| Lowndes | 2,049 | 79.05% | 481 | 18.56% | 62 | 2.39% | 1,568 | 60.49% | 2,592 |
| Macon | 2,520 | 46.18% | 1,629 | 29.85% | 1,308 | 23.97% | 891 | 16.33% | 5,457 |
| Madison | 16,731 | 45.81% | 14,759 | 40.41% | 5,032 | 13.78% | 1,972 | 5.40% | 36,522 |
| Marengo | 4,865 | 65.47% | 2,231 | 30.02% | 335 | 4.51% | 2,634 | 35.45% | 7,431 |
| Marion | 5,034 | 66.24% | 2,231 | 29.36% | 335 | 4.41% | 2,803 | 36.88% | 7,600 |
| Marshall | 4,969 | 49.28% | 4,682 | 46.43% | 432 | 4.28% | 287 | 2.85% | 10,083 |
| Mobile | 44,742 | 66.38% | 18,605 | 27.60% | 4,058 | 6.02% | 26,137 | 38.78% | 67,405 |
| Monroe | 4,899 | 81.96% | 934 | 15.63% | 144 | 2.41% | 3,965 | 66.34% | 5,977 |
| Montgomery | 23,687 | 63.01% | 12,578 | 33.46% | 1,325 | 3.52% | 11,109 | 29.55% | 37,590 |
| Morgan | 10,063 | 64.05% | 4,825 | 30.71% | 824 | 5.24% | 5,238 | 33.34% | 15,712 |
| Perry | 2,708 | 55.54% | 2,043 | 41.90% | 125 | 2.56% | 665 | 13.64% | 4,876 |
| Pickens | 3,682 | 76.69% | 846 | 17.62% | 273 | 5.69% | 2,836 | 59.07% | 4,801 |
| Pike | 4,932 | 69.90% | 1,976 | 28.00% | 148 | 2.10% | 2,956 | 41.89% | 7,056 |
| Randolph | 4,284 | 72.48% | 1,493 | 25.26% | 134 | 2.27% | 2,791 | 47.22% | 5,911 |
| Russell | 6,160 | 78.02% | 1,583 | 20.05% | 152 | 1.93% | 4,577 | 57.97% | 7,895 |
| Shelby | 5,820 | 61.67% | 3,242 | 34.35% | 376 | 3.98% | 2,578 | 27.32% | 9,438 |
| St. Clair | 5,166 | 63.52% | 2,737 | 33.65% | 230 | 2.83% | 2,429 | 29.87% | 8,133 |
| Sumter | 2,185 | 58.67% | 1,374 | 36.90% | 165 | 4.43% | 811 | 21.78% | 3,724 |
| Talladega | 9,329 | 60.26% | 4,981 | 32.18% | 1,170 | 7.56% | 4,348 | 28.09% | 15,480 |
| Tallapoosa | 6,726 | 71.60% | 2,452 | 26.10% | 216 | 2.30% | 4,274 | 45.50% | 9,394 |
| Tuscaloosa | 13,540 | 59.02% | 8,640 | 37.66% | 760 | 3.31% | 4,900 | 21.36% | 22,940 |
| Walker | 10,484 | 63.63% | 5,200 | 31.56% | 793 | 4.81% | 5,284 | 32.07% | 16,477 |
| Washington | 4,063 | 82.95% | 757 | 15.46% | 78 | 1.59% | 3,306 | 67.50% | 4,898 |
| Wilcox | 2,742 | 64.49% | 677 | 15.92% | 833 | 19.59% | 1,909 (Note: In this county where Robinson ran second ahead of Martin, margin given is Wallace vote minus Robinson vote and percentage margin Wallace percent minus Robinson percent.) | 44.90% | 4,252 |
| Winston | 2,502 | 40.66% | 3,509 | 57.03% | 142 | 2.31% | -1,007 | -16.37% | 6,153 |
| Totals | 537,505 | 63.38% | 262,943 | 31.00% | 47,653 | 5.62% | 274,562 | 32.37% | 848,101 |

== Analysis ==
Neither James D. Martin nor Lurleen Wallace sought support from African American voters, many of whom had been registered in the previous year due to the Selma to Montgomery marches and subsequent Voting Rights Act. George Wallace kept the racial issue alive when he signed state legislation to nullify desegregation guidelines between Alabama cities and counties and the former United States Department of Health, Education, and Welfare. Wallace claimed that the law would thwart the national government from intervening in schools. Critics denounced Wallace's "political trickery" and expressed alarm at the potential forfeiture of federal funds. Martin accused the Democrats of "playing politics with your children" and "neglecting academic excellence."
