= 1978 United States Senate election in Alabama =

- November 7, 1978
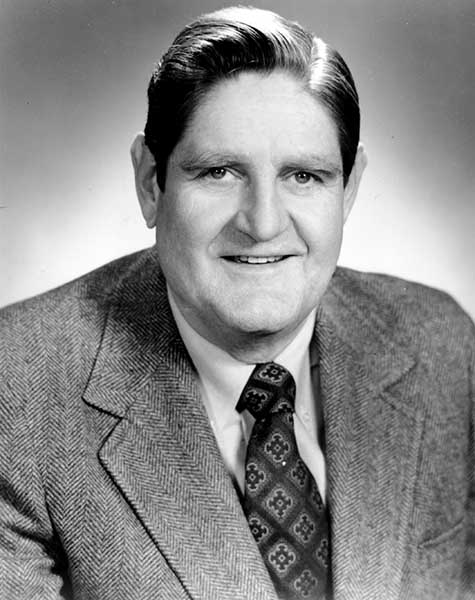

Nominee	Howell Heflin	Jerome B. Couch
Party	Democratic	Prohibition
Popular vote	547,054	34,951
Percentage	93.99%	6.01%
- County results Heflin: 80–90% >90%
U.S. senator before election
John Sparkman
Democratic
Elected U.S. Senator
Howell Heflin
Democratic

Democratic primary first round results by county Heflin: 30–40%; 40–50%; 50–60%; 60–70%; 70–80%; 80–90%; Flowers: 40–50%; 50–60%; 60–70%; 70–80%; 80–90%; Baker: 40–50%; 50–60%; 60–70%

Democratic primary runoff results by county Heflin: 50–60%; 60–70%; 70–80%; 80–90%; Flowers: 50–60%; 60–70%; 70–80%

The 1978 United States Senate election in Alabama was held on November 7, 1978. Incumbent Democratic U.S. Senator John Sparkman decided to retire and Alabama Supreme Court Chief Justice Howell Heflin was elected to succeed him.

Heflin won the Democratic primary against Rep. Walter Flowers and faced only nominal opposition from Prohibition Party nominee Jerome Couch in the general election.

== Democratic primary ==
=== Candidates ===
- John Baker, Alabama State Senator
- Walter Flowers, U.S. Representative
- Howell Heflin, former Chief Justice of the Alabama Supreme Court
- Mac Newton
- Margaret Stewart, perennial candidate
- Gordon Tucker
- Glenn Hewitt

=== Campaign ===
Prior to 1978, Alabama had never popularly elected any Senator from a party other than the Democratic Party, and Democratic candidates typically faced nominal opposition in the general election. Therefore, victory in the Democratic primary was considered tantamount to election.

Incumbent Democrat John Sparkman declined to seek a seventh consecutive term in office. Senator Sparkman retired as the longest-serving Senator in Alabama history.

Alabama Supreme Court Chief Justice Howell Heflin and Congressman Walter Flowers of Tuscaloosa were the leading candidates. Heflin came from a noted Alabama political family which included former Senator James Thomas Heflin, a famous advocate of white supremacy. Flowers was a strong ally of Governor George Wallace, a critic of President Jimmy Carter, and had cast a crucial vote to impeach President Richard Nixon, despite Nixon's strong support in the state.

During the campaign, Heflin attempted to tie himself to the late Senator James Allen. He was rebuffed by Allen's widow, Maryon, who succeeded her husband as Senator and supported Flowers. Maryon noted that Heflin worked for her husband's primary opponent during the 1974 campaign.

=== Results ===
Heflin and Flowers both proceeded to a run-off election, where Heflin won by over 250,000 votes.

Primary election results
Party	Candidate	Votes	%
Democratic	Howell Heflin	369,270	48.37%
Democratic	Walter Flowers	236,894	31.03%
Democratic	John Baker	101,110	13.24%
Democratic	Mac Newton	18,709	2.45%
Democratic	Margaret E. Stewart	17,562	2.35%
Democratic	Gordon Tucker	10,206	2.35%
Democratic	Glenn Hewett	9,702	1.27%
Total votes		763,453	100.00%

Primary runoff election results
Party	Candidate	Votes	%
Democratic	Howell Heflin	556,685	64.93%
Democratic	Walter Flowers	300,654	35.07%
Total votes		857,339	100.00%

== Republican primary ==
=== Candidates ===
==== Withdrew ====
- James D. Martin, former U.S. Representative for Alabama's 7th congressional district (to run in the special election)

After James Martin withdrew from the race to run in the concurrent special election to fill the late Senator Allen's seat, the Republican Party was left without a candidate for this election.

== General election ==
=== Results ===
United States Senate election in Alabama, 1978
Party	Candidate	Votes	%	±%
Democratic	Howell Heflin	547,054	93.99%	+31.72
Prohibition	Jerome B. Couch	34,951	6.01%	N/A
Total votes		582,005	100.00%	N/A
Democratic hold				

== See also ==
- 1978 United States Senate elections
- 1978 Alabama gubernatorial election
