= 1978 United States Senate special election in Alabama =

- November 7, 1978
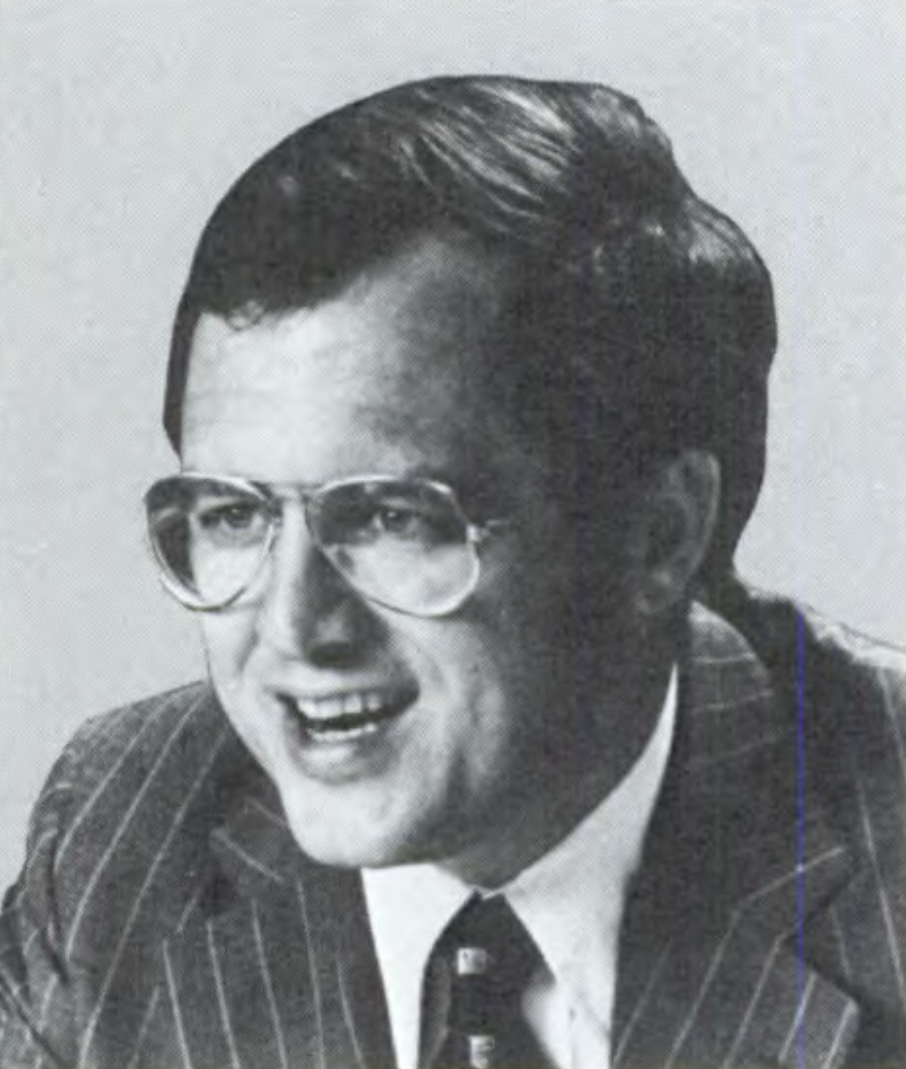

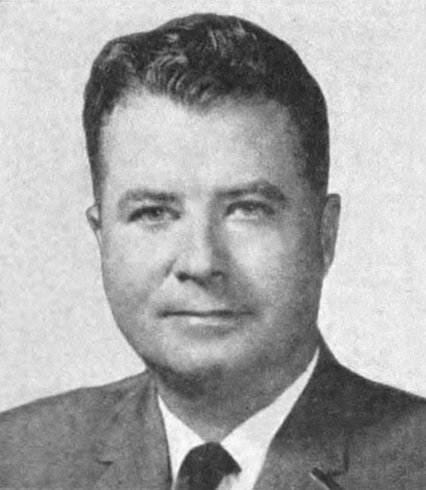
Nominee	Donald W. Stewart	James D. Martin
Party	Democratic	Republican
Popular vote	401,852	316,170
Percentage	54.93%	43.22%
- County results Stewart: 50–60% 60–70% 70–80% 80–90% Martin: 50–60% 60–70%
U.S. senator before election
Maryon Pittman Allen
Democratic
Elected U.S. Senator
Donald W. Stewart
Democratic

The 1978 United States Senate special election in Alabama was held on November 7, 1978. It was a special election to fill the seat which had been held by Senator Jim Allen, who died on June 1. His widow Maryon was appointed on June 8 by governor George Wallace to fill the vacancy until a special election could be held.

Democratic state senator Donald W. Stewart defeated Allen in the Democratic primary then defeated former Republican Congressman James D. Martin to serve the remaining two years of the term.

Primary elections were held on September 5, 1978, with the Democratic runoff held on September 26, 1978.

== Democratic primary ==
=== Candidates ===
- Maryon Pittman Allen, incumbent United States Senator
- Gene Myracle, business owner
- Donald W. Stewart, State Senator
- Ted Taylor, President of the Alabama Trial Lawyers Association
- Dan Wiley, President of the Mobile County Commission

=== Results ===
Democratic primary first round results by county Pittman Allen: 30–40%; 40–50%; 50–60%; 60–70%; 70–80%; Stewart: 30–40%; 40–50%; 50–60%; Taylor: 60–70%; 40–50%; Wiley: 40–50%

Primary election results
Party	Candidate	Votes	%
Democratic	Maryon Pittman Allen (incumbent)	334,156	44.51%
Democratic	Donald W. Stewart	259,795	34.61%
Democratic	Ted Taylor	70,894	9.44%
Democratic	Dan Wiley	66,689	8.88%
Democratic	Gene Myracle	19,166	2.55%
Total votes		750,700	100.00%

=== Runoff results ===
Democratic primary runoff results by county Stewart: 50–60%; 60–70%; 70–80%; Pittman Allen: 50–60%; 60–70%

Primary runoff election results
Party	Candidate	Votes	%
Democratic	Donald W. Stewart	502,346	57.20%
Democratic	Maryon Pittman Allen (incumbent)	375,894	42.80%
Total votes		878,240	100.00%

== Republican primary ==
=== Candidates ===
- Elvin McCary, Republican nominee for Governor in 1974
- George W. Nichols, attorney

=== Results ===
Republican primary results by county Nichols: 50–60%; 60–70%; 70–80%; 80–90%; >90%; McCary: 50–60%; 60–70%; 80–90%; >90%; No Vote

Primary election results
Party	Candidate	Votes	%
Republican	George W. Nichols	15,637	72.47%
Republican	Elvin McCary	5,941	27.53%
Total votes		21,578	100.00%

==== Withdrew ====
Nichols withdrew from the race in order that James D. Martin, former U.S. Representative for Alabama's 7th congressional district, who had been nominated to run in the concurrent regular Senate election, could switch races.

== General election ==
=== Results ===
United States Senate special election in Alabama, 1978
Party	Candidate	Votes	%
Democratic	Donald W. Stewart	401,852	54.93%
Republican	James D. Martin	316,170	43.22%
Libertarian	Michael R. A. Erdey	6,006	0.82%
Prohibition	A. J. Killingsworth	5,814	0.80%
Peace and Freedom	Joseph T. Robino	1,768	0.24%
Majority		85,682	11.74%
Turnout		731,610	
Democratic hold			

== Bibliography ==
- Congressional Elections, 1946-1996. Washington, D.C.: Congressional Quarterly Inc. 1998. ISBN 1-56802-248-4.

== See also ==
- 1978 United States Senate elections
- 1978 United States Senate election in Alabama
- 1978 Alabama gubernatorial election
