= John Sparkman =

American politician (1899–1985)

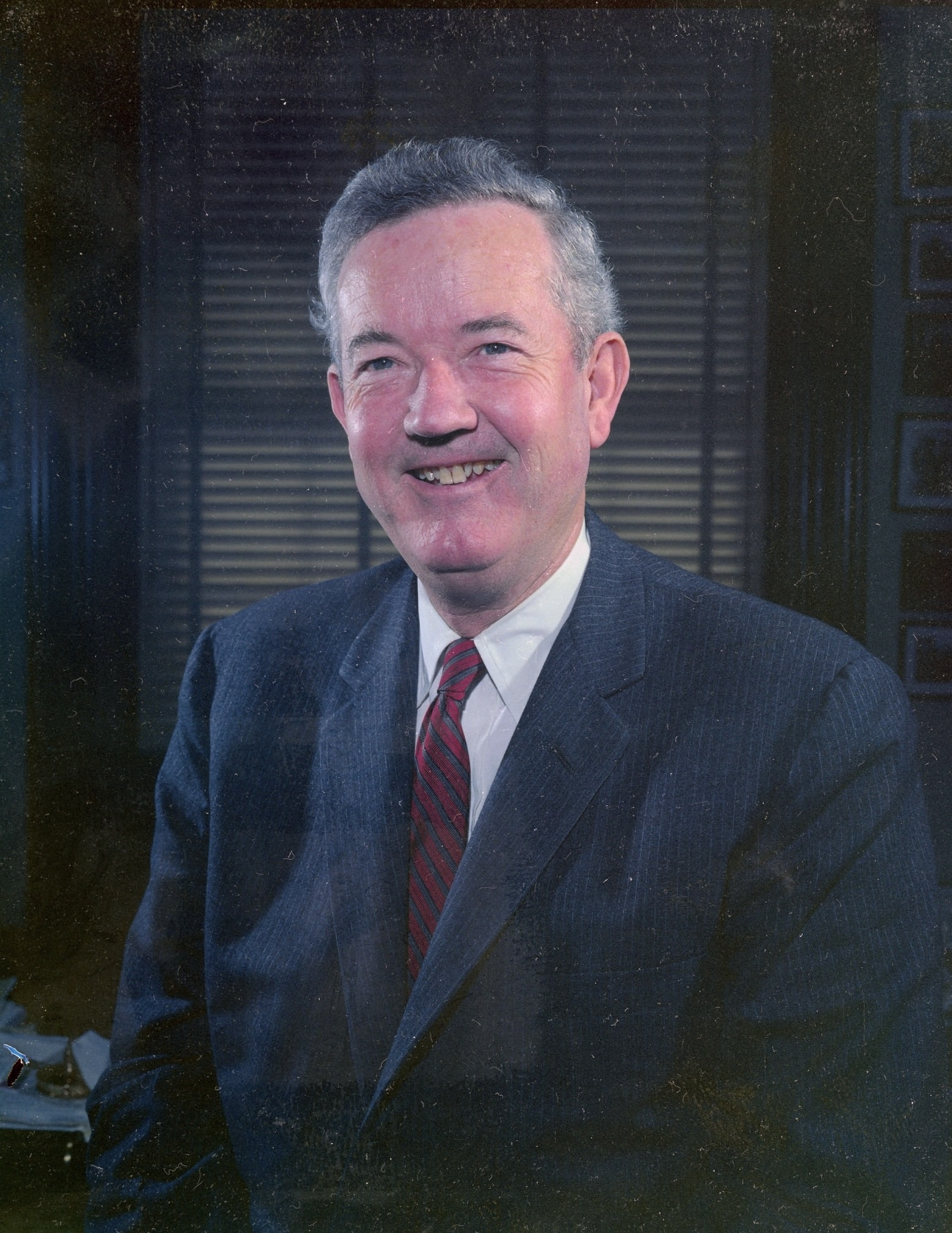
- Sparkman in 1959

United States Senator from Alabama
- In office November 6, 1946 – January 3, 1979
- Preceded by: George R. Swift
- Succeeded by: Howell Heflin
Senate positions
Chair of the Senate Foreign Relations Committee
In office January 3, 1975 – January 3, 1979
Preceded by	J. William Fulbright
Succeeded by	Frank Church
Chair of the Senate Banking Committee
In office January 3, 1967 – January 3, 1975
Preceded by	A. Willis Robertson
Succeeded by	William Proxmire
Chair of the Senate Small Business Committee
In office January 3, 1955 – January 3, 1967
Preceded by	Edward Thye
Succeeded by	George Smathers
In office February 20, 1950 – January 3, 1953
Preceded by	Committee formed
Succeeded by	Edward Thye

Member of the U.S. House of Representatives from Alabama's 8th district
- In office January 3, 1937 – November 6, 1946
- Preceded by: Archibald Hill Carmichael
- Succeeded by: Robert E. Jones Jr.
House positions
House Majority Whip
In office January 1, 1946 – November 6, 1946
Leader	John W. McCormack
Preceded by	Robert Ramspeck
Succeeded by	Leslie C. Arends

Personal details
- Born: John Jackson Sparkman; December 20, 1899 Hartselle, Alabama, U.S.
- Died: November 16, 1985 (aged 85) Huntsville, Alabama, U.S.
- Resting place: Maple Hill Cemetery
- Party: Democratic
- Spouse: Chelsea Ivo Hall (d. 1999)
- Children: 1
- Education: University of Alabama (BA, LLB)

Military service
- Allegiance: United States
- Branch/service: United States Army
- Unit: Student Army Training Corps
- Battles/wars: World War I

John Jackson Sparkman (December 20, 1899 – November 16, 1985) was an American jurist and politician from the state of Alabama. A Southern Democrat, Sparkman served in the United States House of Representatives from 1937 to 1946 and the United States Senate from 1946 until 1979. He was the Democratic Party's nominee for vice president in the 1952 presidential election.

Born in Morgan County, Alabama, Sparkman established a legal practice in Huntsville, Alabama, after graduating from the University of Alabama School of Law. He won election to the House in 1936 and served as house majority whip in 1946. He left the House in 1946 after winning a special election to succeed Senator John H. Bankhead II. While in the Senate, he helped establish Marshall Space Flight Center and served as the chairman of several committees. Sparkman served as Adlai Stevenson's running mate in the 1952 presidential election, but they were defeated by the Republican ticket of Dwight D. Eisenhower and Richard Nixon.

Although supportive of progressive social and economic legislation during the course of his political career, Sparkman was also known as a defender of segregation during the Civil Rights era; voting regularly against civil rights legislation and condemned the "judicial usurpation" of the U.S. Supreme Court decision of Brown v. Board of Education, Sparkman signed the 1956 Southern Manifesto, which pledged opposition to racial integration and promised to use "all lawful means" to fight the ruling that put court power behind the integration of public institutions. He became the longest-serving senator from Alabama in 1977, a record that was surpassed by Richard Shelby in 2019. Sparkman chose not to seek re-election in 1978 and retired from public office the following year.

== Early life and education ==
Sparkman, a son of Whitten Joseph and Julia Mitchell (Kent) Sparkman, was born on a farm near Hartselle, in Morgan County, Alabama. He grew up in a four-room cabin with his eleven brothers and sisters. His father was a tenant farmer and doubled as the county's deputy sheriff. As a child, Sparkman worked on his father's farm picking cotton. He was raised Methodist.

He attended a one-room elementary school in rural Morgan County, then walked 4 miles (6.4 km) every day to his high school. Sparkman graduated from Morgan County High School in 1917 and enrolled in the University of Alabama at Tuscaloosa. During World War I he was a member of the Students Army Training Corps. Sparkman worked shoveling coal in the university's boiler room to help pay for his education. He worked on The Crimson White (the university's newspaper), becoming the paper's editor-in-chief, and served as his class's student-body president. Sparkman was awarded a teaching fellowship in history and political science, he became a founding member of the Gamma Alpha chapter of Pi Kappa Alpha in 1921, and was chosen as the university's "most outstanding senior" the same year. He received his Bachelor of Arts in 1921, and his Bachelor of Laws from the University of Alabama School of Law in 1923. In 1924, Sparkman earned his master's degree in history; his master thesis, on former Confederate colonel William C. Oates's 1894 campaign for Governor of Alabama, was titled "The Kolb-Oates Campaign of 1894".

== Legal career ==
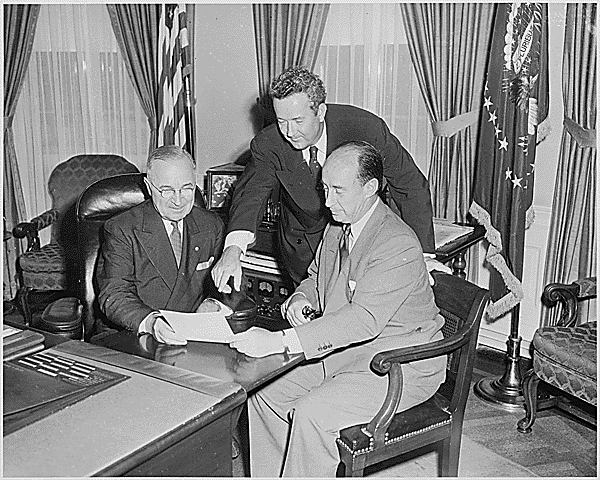
From left: President Harry S. Truman, Senator Sparkman and Adlai Stevenson II in the Oval Office

Sparkman briefly worked as a high school teacher before he was admitted to the Alabama State Bar in 1925. He commenced his practice in Huntsville. He was also an instructor at Huntsville College from 1925 to 1928. He was appointed as a U.S. Commissioner (magistrate judge) for Alabama's northern judicial district, serving from 1930 to 1931.

Sparkman was involved in many civic organizations, including serving as the district governor of the Kiwanis Club of Huntsville in 1930, and later as the president of the Huntsville Chamber of Commerce. A Freemason, he was life member of Helion Lodge#1 in Huntsville. He was also member of the Huntsville Scottish Rite bodies and a recipient of the Knight Commander Court of Honor (KCCH).

== Political career ==
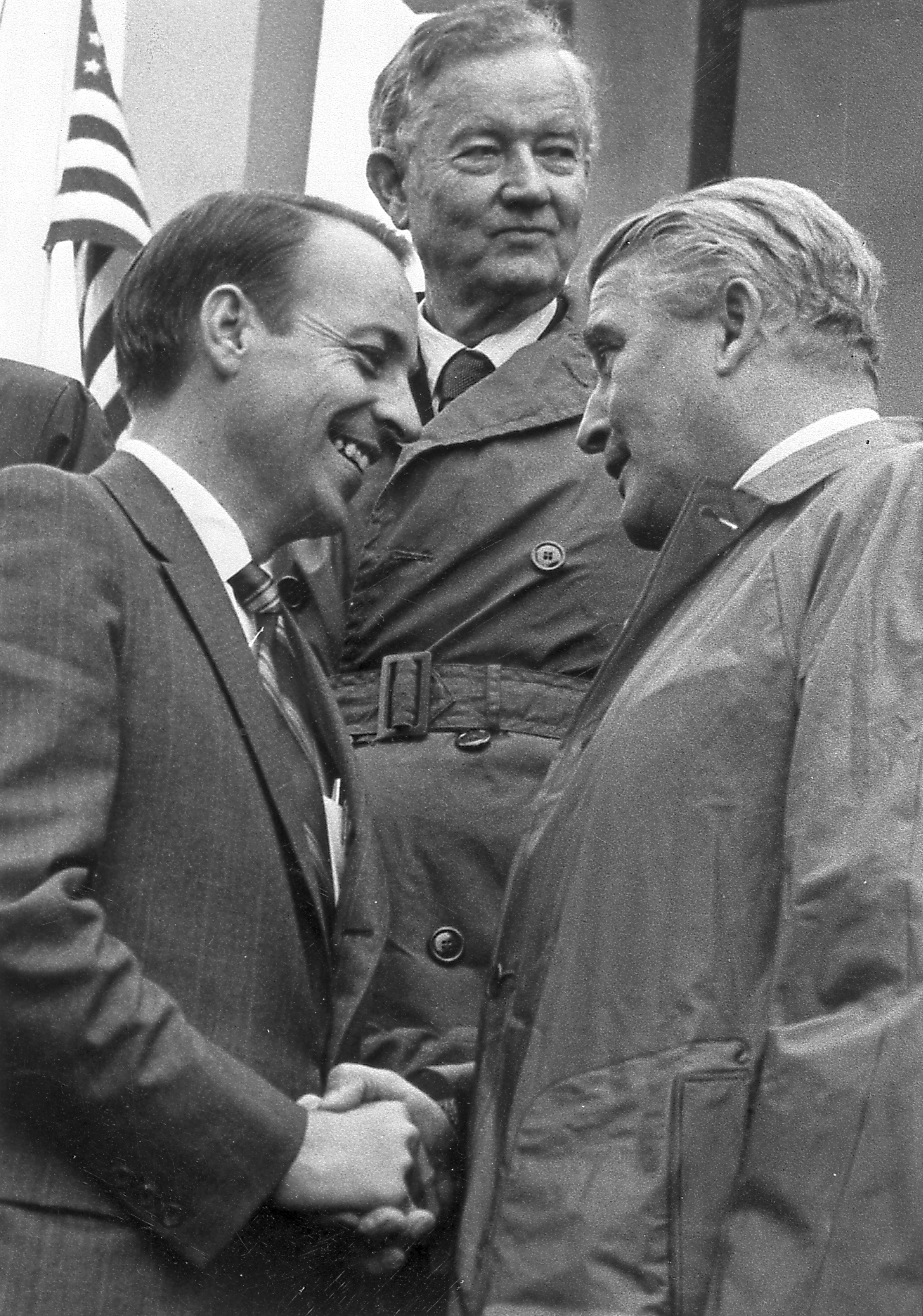
In 1970, Wernher von Braun (right) was honored for his career in Huntsville, Alabama, with the celebration of Wernher von Braun Day. Among those participating were Sparkman (center) and Alabama governor Albert Brewer (left).

After Representative Archibald Hill Carmichael announced his retirement in 1936, Sparkman ran in the Democratic primary for the open seat. A teacher of the Big Brother Class at the First Methodist Church in Huntsville, his campaign was launched through fundraising, campaigning and advertising by students in his Sunday class. Sparkman was elected to the United States House of Representatives in the 1936 election, defeating Union Party candidate, architect Harry J. Frahn with 99.7% of the vote. He was reelected in 1938 and 1940. During this time, World War II began in Europe. Sparkman took a pro-British foreign policy stance, advocating the United States should assist Great Britain in the war against the Nazis. In 1941, he voted in favor of the Lend-Lease Act of 1941 in order to provide military equipment and food to the United Kingdom. Sparkman was reelected in the elections of 1942 and 1944, serving in the 75th, 76th, 77th, 78th, and 79th Congresses.

As a Member of the House of Representatives, "[Sparkman] gained renown for his sponsorship of such programs as the farm-tenant purchase program, rehabilitation loans for small farmers, and lower interest rates for farm loans. He was a champion of the TVA and REA."

In 1946, he served as house majority whip. He was reelected in the 1946 House election to the 80th Congress and on the same date was elected to the United States Senate in a special election to fill the vacancy caused by the death of John H. Bankhead II, for the term ending on January 3, 1949. Sparkman resigned from the House of Representatives immediately following the election and began his Senate term on November 6, 1946. He served until his retirement on January 3, 1979, having not sought reelection in 1978.

He was chairman of the Select Committee on Small Business (81st, 82nd, and 84th through 90th Congresses), co-chairman of the Joint Committee on Inaugural Arrangements (86th Congress), chairman of the Committee on Banking and Currency (90th and 91st Congresses), co-chairman of the Joint Committee on Defense Production (91st and 93rd Congresses), Committee on Banking, Housing, and Urban Affairs (92nd and 93rd Congresses), and a member of the Committee on Foreign Relations (94th and 95th Congress).

The 1943 Sparkman Act, which allowed female physicians to be commissioned as officers in the armed forces, was named after him.

In 1949, Sparkman was instrumental in convincing the United States Department of the Army to transfer the missile development activities from Fort Bliss, Texas, to Redstone Arsenal. This brought Wernher von Braun and the German Operation Paperclip scientists and engineers to Huntsville, forming the foundation to what eventually became the NASA Marshall Space Flight Center. Von Braun selected Huntsville to relocate his fellow German engineers because it reminded him of Germany.

Sparkman was a representative of the United States at the Fifth General Assembly of the United Nations in 1950.

In January 1951, Sparkman stated that he believed the Truman administration housing defense program could increase inflationary pressures, a view that aligned with Republican senators Irving Ives and Andrew Frank Schoeppel, but furthered that the plan was essential and should be undertaken regardless of inflation concerns. On September 8, 1951, he was the fourth signatory to the Treaty of Peace with Japan (with two declarations).

In 1952, he was the Democratic Party's nominee for vice president, running on the ticket of Adlai Stevenson II. However, the election was won by the Republican candidate, Dwight D. Eisenhower. Sparkman ran against Richard Nixon, the junior senator from California, who would later became president.

After the election, Sparkman in an interview expressed approval that American small businessmen were giving large firms competition for foreign aid contracts. "The large firms once dominated this field. Now we are insisting that the small business get a fair share of these contracts and it has had a good effect. The increasing competition has cut costs in the entire American foreign aid program."

In January 1955, the University of Alabama News Bureau released remarks of Sparkman he had made during an interview following the 1954 midterm elections. Sparkman predicted a larger number of Democrats would cooperate with the Eisenhower administration, furthering that their tendency to criticize the Republicans rather than the president directly was ending, and Republicans, by contrast, would be more likely to oppose the president's foreign policy. Sparkman advocated for studying of the administration's defense program to confirm that the reduction in numbers would not be concurrent with a decrease in strength.

On January 21, 1955, Sparkman introduced a bill authorizing $50 million in appropriation each quarter of the year for G.I.s to see a reduction dependent on the sales of home mortgages to private lenders of properties owned by the Veterans Administration. In a statement, Sparkman argued that the past few years had seen a home loan program which had come up short in meeting the needs of GI applications and the government was making a profit from the loans to GI's.

On February 2, 1955, during an interview, Sparkman said the US would have to weigh giving Nationalist islands to Red China if the United Nations succeeded in imposing a cease-fire in Formosa. He said the Eisenhower administration had a foggy attitude towards defending the islands.

In February 1955, Sparkman criticized the farming policies of the Eisenhower administration, charging them with having hurt the financial situations of American farmers the most since before the beginning of World War II and that the plight of farmers would continue so long as legislation affecting controls on crop acreage and the flexible price support system was enacted.

Sparkman delivered a speech at the Jefferson-Jackson Day dinner in Rome, Georgia on February 21, 1955, assailing Republican economic promises as a hoax and asserting the Eisenhower administration was operating on a theory of reactionary trickle-down economics. He said the school and road programs of the Eisenhower administration were intended to deliver larger funds to investment bankers rather than children or those using highways, predicting that the enactment of Eisenhower's school program would not see a single classroom built in either Georgia or Alabama.

On February 25, 1955, Sparkman predicted the Senate would approve the authorization of one and a half billion dollars of government insurance to be granted for housing mortgages, saying that if the bill was not enacted, "our housing program will come to a stop."

In 1956, Sparkman was one of 82 representatives and 19 senators who signed the Southern Manifesto opposing the 1954 U.S. Supreme Court decision Brown v. Board of Education and racial integration. In 1956, the Democrats did not renominate Sparkman as Stevenson's vice presidential running mate, opting instead for U.S. Senator Estes Kefauver of neighboring Tennessee, partly because he had refused to sign. In 1957, Sparkman voted against HR 6127, the Civil Rights Act of 1957.

On June 30, 1961, President John F. Kennedy signed the Housing Act of 1961; Kennedy thanked Sparkman for spearheading "this bill through the Senate". During the September 4, 1964 signing of the Housing Act of 1964 by President Lyndon B. Johnson, the latter expressed his "very special congratulations this morning to both Senator Sparkman and Congressman Rains of Alabama."

In August 1961, the Kennedy administration reaffirmed its lack of interest in compromising on its five-year foreign aid program, Sparkman arguing that the administration faced the possibility of having to settle for a reduction in the program by two years.

On June 19, 1964, Sparkman and 20 other Southern Democrats, and one lone Southern Republican voted against the Civil Rights Act of 1964. Sparkman opposed the 1964 Act on the grounds that it would (as noted by one journal) “work against President Johnson’s anti-poverty program by penalizing the poor through federal fund cutoffs.”

On July 9, 1964, President Johnson signed the Urban Mass Transportation Act of 1964 into law, observing Sparkman was one of the members of Congress who helped in securing the legislation's passage.

From 1967 to 1975, Sparkman was the chairman of the Committee on Banking and Currency where he worked on helping small farmers. From 1975 to 1979, he chaired the Foreign Relations Committee, succeeding longstanding chairman J. William Fulbright after Fulbright was primaried. His perceived lack of leadership and desire to leave matters of foreign policy to the President, only giving them advice and consent, resulted in the diminishing of the committee's influence.

On January 20, 1978, at the age of 78, Sparkman announced that—for reasons he did not specify—he would not seek reelection as Alabama senator, but noted that he had served as Alabama senator for longer than anybody in history up to that point.

=== Later elections ===
In 1960, Sparkman defeated the Republican Julian E. Elgin of Montgomery, who received 164,868 votes (29.8 percent) in the Senate contest. Six years later, Elgin ran again against Sparkman as an Independent but polled few votes. In 1966, Sparkman defeated another Republican, John Grenier, the former state GOP chairman and an attorney from Birmingham, who polled 39 percent of the vote.

Initially, Grenier had planned to run for governor in 1966, and James D. Martin was poised to oppose Sparkman, as Martin had four years earlier against Sparkman's colleague, J. Lister Hill. However, The New York Times predicted toppling the "tight one-party oligarchy" would be a herculean task. Though Sparkman trailed in some polls, The Times speculated that he would rebound because Alabamians were accustomed to voting straight Democratic tickets.

In his last Senate race in 1972, Sparkman easily defeated President Nixon's former postmaster general, the Republican businessman Winton M. Blount of Montgomery, originally from Union Springs. Blount, running without a specific endorsement from President Nixon, first had to dispatch intraparty Republican rivals Martin and Alabama State Representative Bert Nettles.

On October 30, 1977, Sparkman became the longest-serving senator in the history of Alabama. This record was later surpassed by Richard Shelby in 2019.

== Death ==
On November 16, 1985, Sparkman died of a heart attack at Big Springs Manor Nursing Home in Huntsville, Alabama, a month before his 86th birthday. Survived by his wife and daughter, he was interred in Huntsville at the historic Maple Hill Cemetery.

Sparkman High School in Harvest, Alabama, Sparkman Park in Hartselle, Alabama, Sparkman School in Somerville, Alabama, Sparkman Drive in Huntsville are all named in his honor.

== Electoral history ==
1972 Alabama United States Senatorial Election

John Sparkman (D) (inc.) 62.3%
Winton M. Blount (R) 33.1%

1966 Alabama United States Senatorial Election

John Sparkman (D) (inc.) 60.1%
John Grenier (R) 39%

1960 Alabama United States Senatorial Election

John Sparkman (D) (inc.) 70.2%
Julian Elgin (R) 29.8%

1954 Alabama United States Senatorial Election

John Sparkman (D) (inc.) 82.5%
J. Foy Guin Jr. (R) 17.5%

1952 United States Presidential Election (Vice President's seat)

Richard Nixon (R) 55.2%
John Sparkman (D) 44.3%
Charlotta Bass (Progressive) 0.2%
Enoch Holtwick (Prohibition) 0.1%

1948 Alabama United States Senatorial Election

John Sparkman (D) (inc.) 84%
John G. Parsons (R) 16%

1946 Alabama United States Senatorial Special Election

John Sparkman (D) Unopposed

== Writings by Sparkman ==
- Sparkman, John. "Checks and balances in American foreign policy." Ind. LJ 52 (1976): 433. online
- Sparkman, John. "The Problems of Multi-State Taxation of Interstate Commerce Income." American Bar Association Journal (1960): 375–378.
- Sparkman, John. "Multinational Corporation and Foreign Investment, The." Mercer L. Rev. 27 (1975): 381.

U.S. House of Representatives
Preceded by Archibald Hill Carmichael	Member of the U.S. House of Representatives from Alabama's 8th congressional district 1937–1946	Succeeded by Robert E. Jones Jr.
Preceded by Robert Ramspeck	House Majority Whip; 1946	Succeeded by Leslie C. Arends
Party political offices
Preceded by Robert Ramspeck	House Democratic Whip; 1946	Succeeded by John William McCormack
Preceded by John H. Bankhead II	Democratic nominee for U.S. Senator from Alabama (Class 2); 1946, 1948, 1954, 1960, 1966, 1972	Succeeded by Howell Heflin
Preceded by Alben W. Barkley	Democratic nominee for Vice President of the United States; 1952	Succeeded by Estes Kefauver
U.S. Senate
Preceded by George R. Swift	U.S. Senator (Class 2) from Alabama; 1946–1979; Served alongside: J. Lister Hill, James Allen, Maryon Pittman Allen, Donald Stewart	Succeeded by Howell Heflin
Preceded by Edward Thye	Chair of the Senate Small Business Committee; 1955–1967	Succeeded by George Smathers
Preceded by Styles Bridges	Chair of the Joint Inaugural Ceremonies Committee; 1960–1961	Succeeded by B. Everett Jordan
Preceded by A. Willis Robertson	Chair of the Senate Banking Committee; 1967–1975	Succeeded by William Proxmire
Preceded by J. William Fulbright	Chair of the Senate Foreign Relations Committee; 1975–1979	Succeeded by Frank Church
