= Maryon Pittman Allen =

American journalist (1925–2018)

Maryon Allen
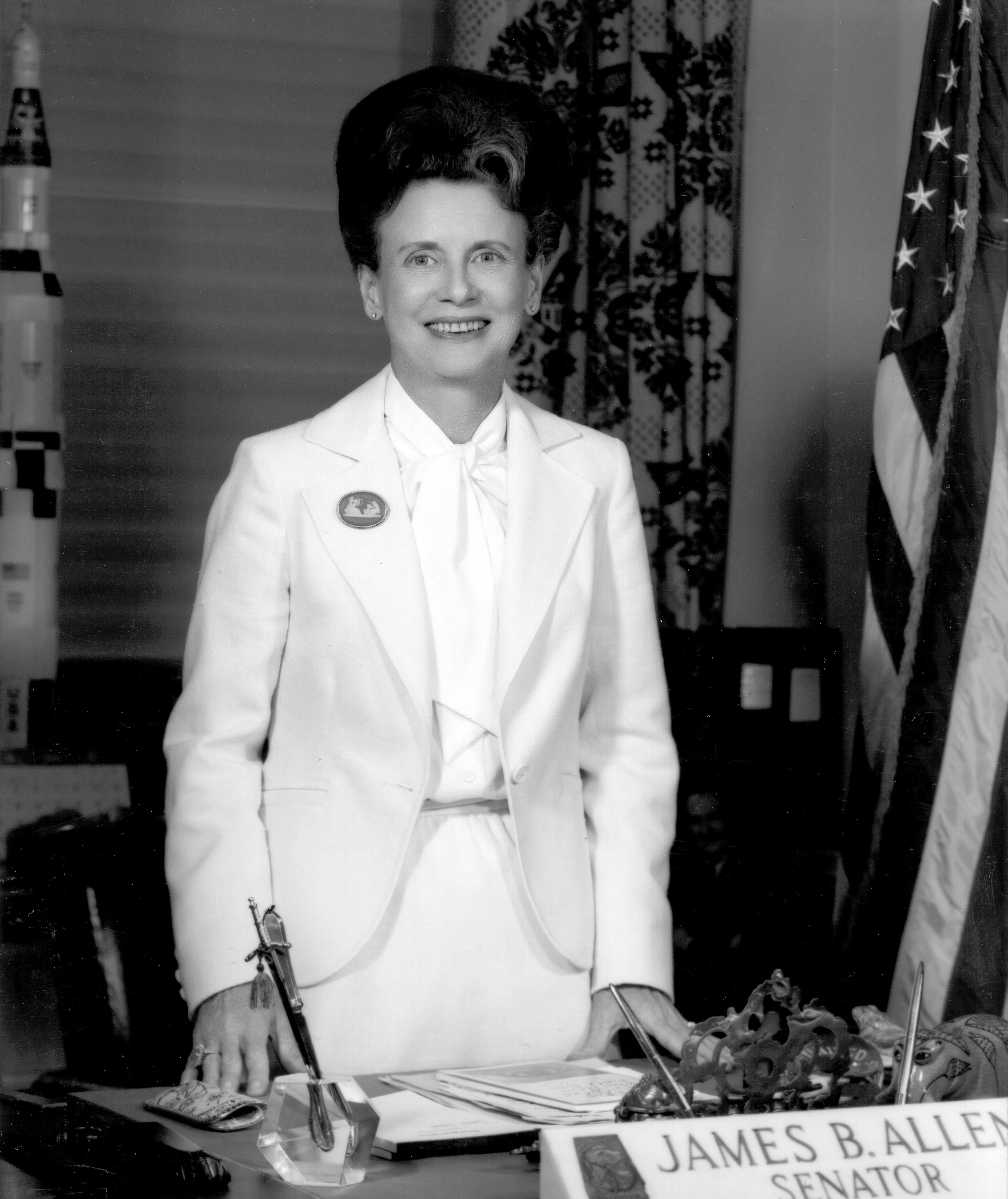

United States Senator from Alabama
- In office June 8, 1978 – November 7, 1978
- Appointed by: George Wallace
- Preceded by: James Allen
- Succeeded by: Donald Stewart

Second Lady of Alabama
- In role August 1964 – January 16, 1967
- Lt. Governor: James Allen
- Preceded by: Helen Balfour Drake (1963)
- Succeeded by: Martha Farmer Brewer

Personal details
- Born: Maryon Pittman; November 30, 1925 Meridian, Mississippi, U.S.
- Died: July 23, 2018 (aged 92) Birmingham, Alabama, U.S.
- Party: Democratic
- Spouse(s): Joshua Mullins (1946–1959); Jim Allen (1964–1978)
- Children: 3; 2 stepchildren
- Education: University of Alabama, Tuscaloosa

Maryon Allen (née Pittman; November 30, 1925 – July 23, 2018) was an American journalist who served as United States Senator from Alabama for five months in 1978, after her husband, Senator James B. Allen, died in office. She held no public office prior to her appointment to her husband's old senate seat. She was appointed by Democratic Alabama Governor George Wallace.

== Early life ==
Maryon Pittman was born in Meridian, Mississippi, in 1925. The following year the family moved to Birmingham, Alabama, where her father established a tractor dealership and where she grew up and attended public school. From 1944 to 1947, she studied journalism at the University of Alabama but did not graduate. In 1946, while a student, she married Joshua Mullins. The couple had three children, who were still young in 1959 when the marriage ended in divorce.

Following her divorce, she went to work, first as an insurance agent and later as the editor of the women's sections for five weekly newspapers in the Birmingham area. That experience led to a position as a staff writer for the Birmingham News. It was in that capacity that she met James "Jim" Allen, then lieutenant governor of Alabama, in 1964, when she interviewed him in connection with a speech he had delivered to the Alabama Federation of Women's Clubs. She and Allen, a widower with two children, were attracted to each other and married in August 1964, after a courtship of just four months.

== Political spouse ==
Upon her second marriage, Maryon Pittman Allen became a political wife. As lieutenant governor, Jim Allen had to preside over the Alabama State Senate in a special session of the state legislature that Governor George C. Wallace had called three days before the wedding. In a newspaper article published shortly thereafter, she wrote that the legislative session had resulted in the couple's having "the most public, political honeymoon in history".

In 1967, the same year that her husband finished his term as lieutenant governor, Maryon Allen discovered that she had tuberculosis and underwent several months of treatment. The following year she wrote a series of articles for Alabama newspapers in which she described her experiences. Her articles described the care programs in Alabama hospitals and urged readers to get tuberculin tests and chest X-rays.

In 1968, Jim Allen won election to the United States Senate. When he took office in January 1969, Maryon accompanied him to Washington, D.C. She continued working as a journalist, writing a syndicated news column called "The Reflections of a News Hen" for newspapers in Alabama. The column won Alabama Press Association awards as "best original column".

== U.S. Senate ==
Jim Allen died suddenly on June 1, 1978, the victim of a heart attack. One week later, on June 8, 1978, Alabama Governor George Wallace appointed Maryon Allen to succeed her husband in the Senate. Allen was the second of the four Senators to serve during the twenty-seventh Senate term for Alabama's Class 3 seat, from January 3, 1975, to January 3, 1981, after her husband.

In the Senate, she gained assignments to two of the committees on which her husband had served, Judiciary and Agriculture, Nutrition, and Forestry, but was unsuccessful in her effort to get appointed to the Rules and Administration Committee. She was the first woman to serve on the Senate Judiciary Committee.

Like her husband, Maryon Allen was very conservative even by Alabama Democratic standards of the time. In October 1978, she voted for a proposal to allow states that had ratified the Equal Rights Amendment (ERA) to rescind their ratification. At the time, 35 states had ratified the ERA, three short of the total that would be needed before March 1979 in order to add the ERA to the U.S. Constitution. The proposal to allow states to rescind their ratifications failed to win a majority, and the Senate went on to join the House in voting to give states three additional years to ratify the ERA, but no additional states ratified it, so it failed.

Following her appointment to the Senate, Allen decided to become a candidate in the November 1978 special election for the remaining two years of her husband's Senate term. Governor Wallace had been expected to seek the Senate seat, but he decided not to run, making Allen the favorite to win. However, she suffered serious damage to her public image after the Washington Post published an interview she had given to reporter Sally Quinn. Quinn quoted statements by Allen that appeared critical of Governor Wallace and his wife Lurleen Wallace. Allen said that Quinn had distorted her statements, but the comments alienated many Alabamians, and some questioned her judgment in sitting for an interview with the Post, which conservatives considered to be a liberal publication. She won a plurality in the September 5, 1978, Democratic primary election, receiving 44 percent of the vote, but failed to win the outright majority that was needed to avoid a runoff. In the runoff held on September 26, she lost to State Senator Donald W. Stewart by more than 120,000 votes. Stewart went on to win the general election on November 7, and Allen left the Senate the following day.

During her time in office, Maryon Allen was one of only two women in the Senate. The other woman Senator, Muriel Humphrey, had been appointed in January 1978 to fill the seat vacated by the death of her husband, Hubert Humphrey. Muriel Humphrey also left the Senate in November 1978, immediately after the election of a successor.

== Later years ==
After the end of her brief service in the Senate, Allen worked for a time as a columnist for The Washington Post. In later years, she returned to Alabama, where she did public relations work for an antique dealer and auction house in Birmingham.

Maryon Pittman Allen died on July 23, 2018, at the age of 92.

== See also ==
- Women in the United States Senate

U.S. Senate
Preceded by Jim Allen	U.S. Senator (Class 3) from Alabama; 1978; Served alongside: John Sparkman	Succeeded by Donald Stewart
