= Carl Elliott =

American politician (1913–1999)

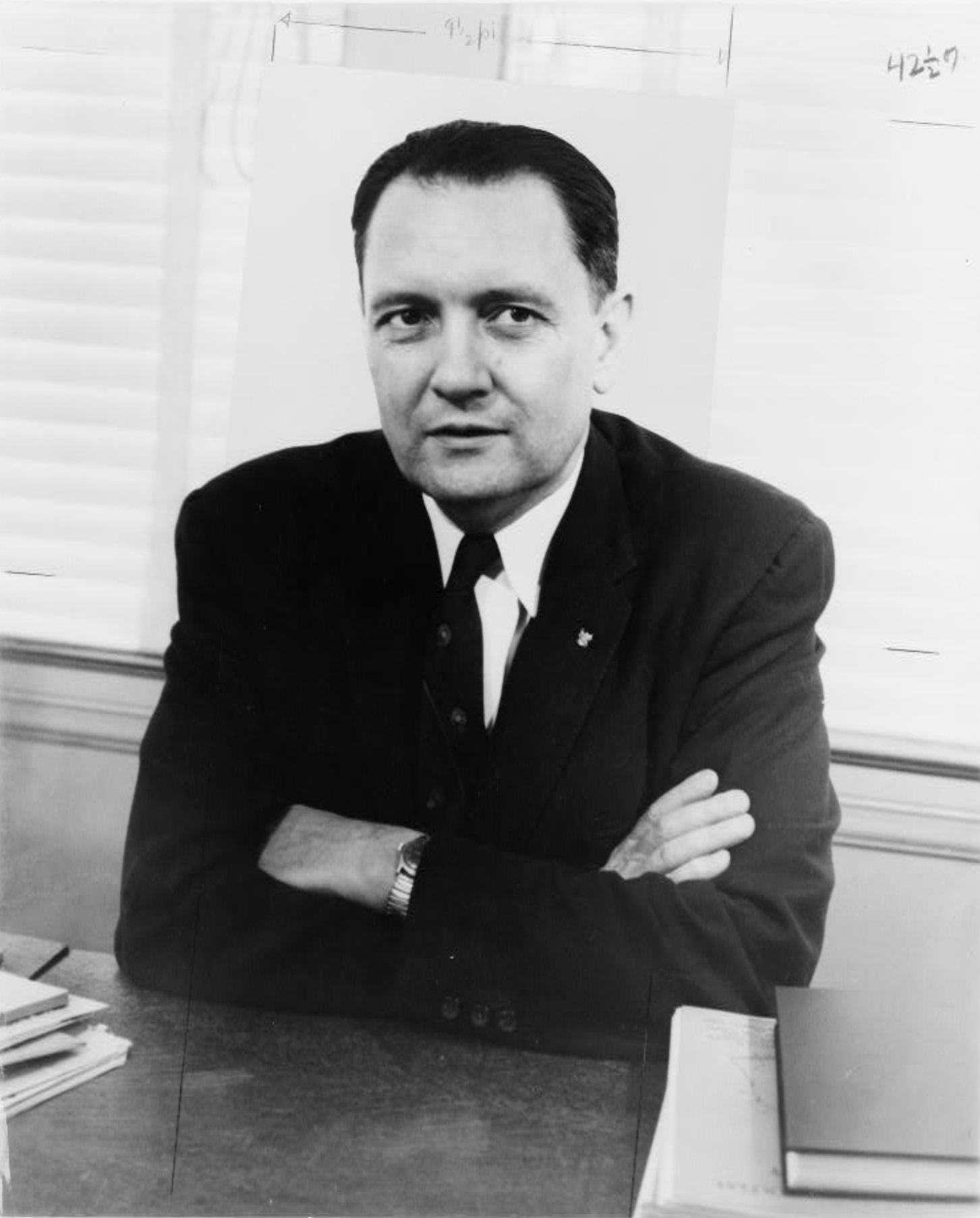

Member of the U.S. House of Representatives from Alabama
- In office January 3, 1949 – January 3, 1965
- Preceded by: Carter Manasco
- Succeeded by: James D. Martin (redistricting)
- Constituency: 7th district (1949-1963); At-large (1963-1965)

Personal details
- Born: Carl Atwood Elliott; December 20, 1913 Franklin County, Alabama, USA
- Died: January 9, 1999 (aged 85) Jasper, Alabama
- Party: Democratic
- Education: University of Alabama; University of Alabama Law School
- Occupation: Attorney

Military service
- Branch/service: United States Army
- Battles/wars: World War II

Carl Atwood Elliott (December 20, 1913 – January 9, 1999) was a U.S. representative from the U.S. state of Alabama. A New Deal Democrat, He was elected to eight consecutive terms, having served from 1949 to 1965.

== Background ==
Elliott was born in rural Franklin County in northwest Alabama. He graduated at the age of sixteen from Vina High School in Vina in Franklin County. Few expected him to be able to afford college because of the Great Depression. However, the University of Alabama, under its president George H. Denny, allowed young Elliott to work at a variety of jobs about campus to pay his educational expenses. In 1933, he received his undergraduate degree, and he subsequently enrolled at the University of Alabama School of Law, also located in Tuscaloosa.

While a law student, Elliott ran for the high-profile position of president of the student government. With the support of the growing number of out-of-state students and women, Elliott became the first person to defeat "the Machine", a select coalition of fraternities and sororities that to this day dominates campus politics at the university. In 1936, Elliott completed his term as SGA president and graduated with his law degree.

== Legal and congressional career ==
Elliott then began his law practice in Russellville near his hometown but soon moved to the community that he would call home for the remainder of his life: Jasper in Walker County, Alabama. As an attorney in Jasper, Elliott spent most of his time representing coal miners and their families, foreshadowing his long political career of fighting for Alabama's poorest, most disadvantaged people.

=== World War II ===
He served in the United States Army from 1942 to 1944.

=== Congress ===
He was twice elected a local judge in Jasper before he ran for Congress in 1948. His "Farm Boy to Congress" persona proved popular among the working class in his district, and in 1948, he unseated Representative Carter Manasco, to the surprise of many political observers. Upon winning the election, Elliott and his wife purchased a residence in the nation's capital and spent the next sixteen years traveling back and forth between Washington, D.C., and Jasper.

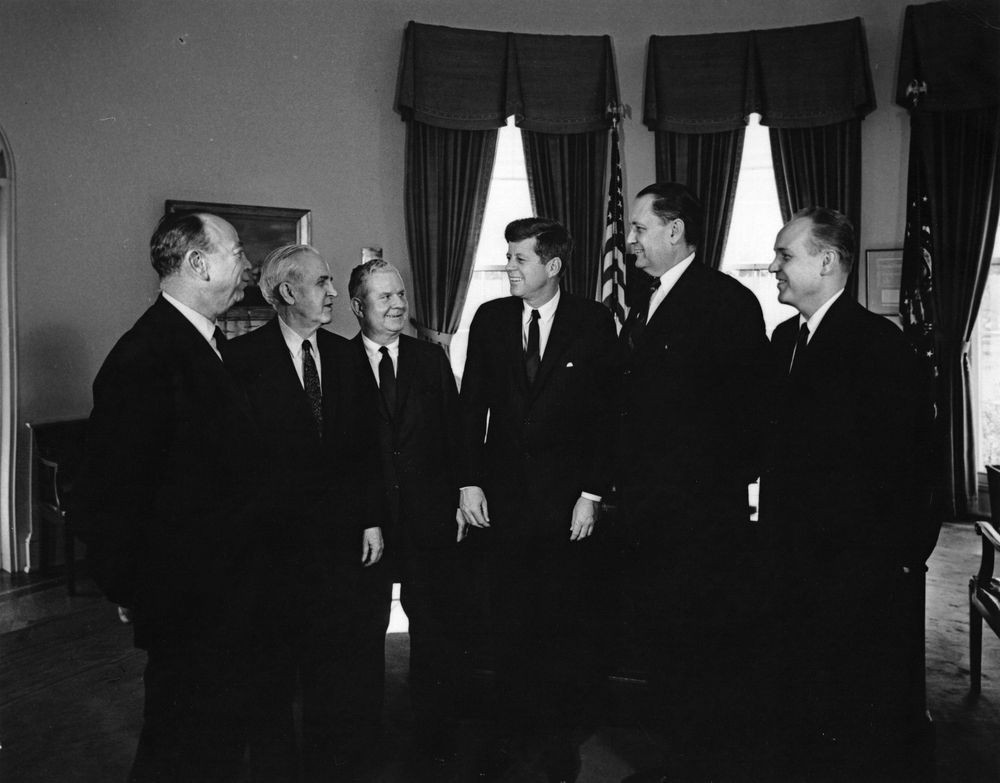
President John F. Kennedy meets with members of Congress. Left to right: Representative Phil M. Landrum (Georgia); Representative James William Trimble (Arkansas); Representative Harris B. McDowell, Jr. (Delaware); President Kennedy; Representative Carl Elliott (Alabama); Representative Stanley R. Tupper (Maine). Oval Office, White House, Washington, D.C.

Elliott represented Alabama's 7th congressional district. He served on the House Veterans Committee, the Education and Labor Committee, and the Rules Committee. He chaired the Select Committee for Government Research. In 1956, Elliott authored the Library Services Act, which brought mobile libraries (bookmobiles) and continuing library service to millions of rural Americans. The same year, he was one of 101 politicians to sign the Southern Manifesto in opposition to racial integration of public places. In 1957, he voted against the Civil Rights Act. In 1958, he co-authored the National Defense Education Act, which, in the wake of the U.S.S.R.'s early post-Sputnik lead in the Space Race, improved science, foreign language, and technology education nationwide and provided low-interest loans for college and graduate school for needy students. Both laws have been extended; more than 30 million college students nationwide have obtained loans under Elliott's NDEA legislation. In 1960 and 1964, he voted against the Civil Rights Acts of those years.

== Other political races ==
Alabama had failed to redistrict itself from nine to eight districts in 1962, based on the 1960 census. Primaries were held in each of the nine districts, and a statewide runoff election narrowed the number elected to eight. By the time of the 1964 primaries, a redistricting plan still had not passed, so Elliott defeated later 7th District Representative Tom Bevill in a primary. Then in the statewide runoff, Elliott was the congressman who was eliminated. His defeat was attributed to his policy conflicts with then Governor George C. Wallace. Alabama passed a redistricting plan after the runoff primary to avert a second statewide general election.

In the 1964 congressional general election, the Democrat George C. Hawkins, the president pro tempore of the Alabama State Senate, was defeated by the Republican James D. Martin, an oil products distributor from Gadsden. Martin had made a strong but losing race in 1962 against U.S. Senator J. Lister Hill. Some Elliott backers threatened to withhold votes from Hawkins or even to vote for Martin on the theory that Elliott might be able to reclaim the House seat in 1966 if he were pitted against a Republican in the historically Democratic district.

In 1966, Elliott did not run for Congress against Martin; nor did Martin seek reelection to the U.S. House. Instead, Elliott and Martin were unsuccessful candidates for governor. Elliott and three other prominent Democrats, Attorney General Richmond Flowers, Sr. and former governors James Folsom and John Malcolm Patterson, lost their party's nomination to Lurleen Burns Wallace, the surrogate candidate of her husband, George Wallace, who was ineligible to succeed himself at that time. Lurleen Wallace then defeated Martin in the gubernatorial general election. In his gubernatorial bid, Elliott stressed federal assistance to the needy, improved education, and racial tolerance. In the campaign, he faced bomb threats, defaced campaign billboards, and Ku Klux Klan protest appearances at several of his speeches.

== Death and legacy ==
After Elliott's defeat, he slipped into political obscurity, having spent his congressional pension on the failed gubernatorial bid. He resumed practicing law, writing books about local history, producing columns and book reviews for area newspapers, and publishing books by local authors. His books include five volumes of Annals of Northwest Alabama, a history of Red Bay, Alabama, and seven volumes on the history of area coal miners.

In 1982 he was awarded American Library Association Honorary Membership.

In 1990, Elliott received new recognition of his achievements when he became the first recipient of the John F. Kennedy Profile in Courage Award; the second in 1991 was U.S. Representative Charles Weltner, a civil rights advocate from Georgia. In the twilight of his life, he received long-sought vindication when he was able to travel to Boston, Massachusetts, to accept the award from then U.S. Senator Edward M. Kennedy. His autobiography, The Cost of Courage: The Journey of An American Congressman, written with journalist Michael D'Orso and published in 1992, was reprinted by the University of Alabama Press.

A one-hour television special, Conscience of a Congressman: The Life and Times of Carl Elliott, was produced as an episode of The Alabama Experience documentary series by the University of Alabama Center for Public Television & Radio. Only weeks before her death, the ailing Jacqueline Kennedy Onassis watched "Conscience of a Congressman." She had met Elliott when he had served in Congress with her husband. Mrs. Onassis was also the editor of Elliott's memoirs. In a letter to Elliott, she wrote that the power of the program "was going to be in what it does to young people."

Elliott died in 1999.

U.S. House of Representatives
Preceded by Carter Manasco	Member of the U.S. House of Representatives from Alabama's 7th congressional district January 3, 1949 – January 3, 1963	Succeeded by James Douglas Martin
Preceded by District inactive	Member of the U.S. House of Representatives from Alabama's at-large congressional district January 3, 1963 – January 3, 1965 all representatives elected at-large on a general ticket	Succeeded by District inactive
