= Lurleen Wallace =

American politician (1926–1968)

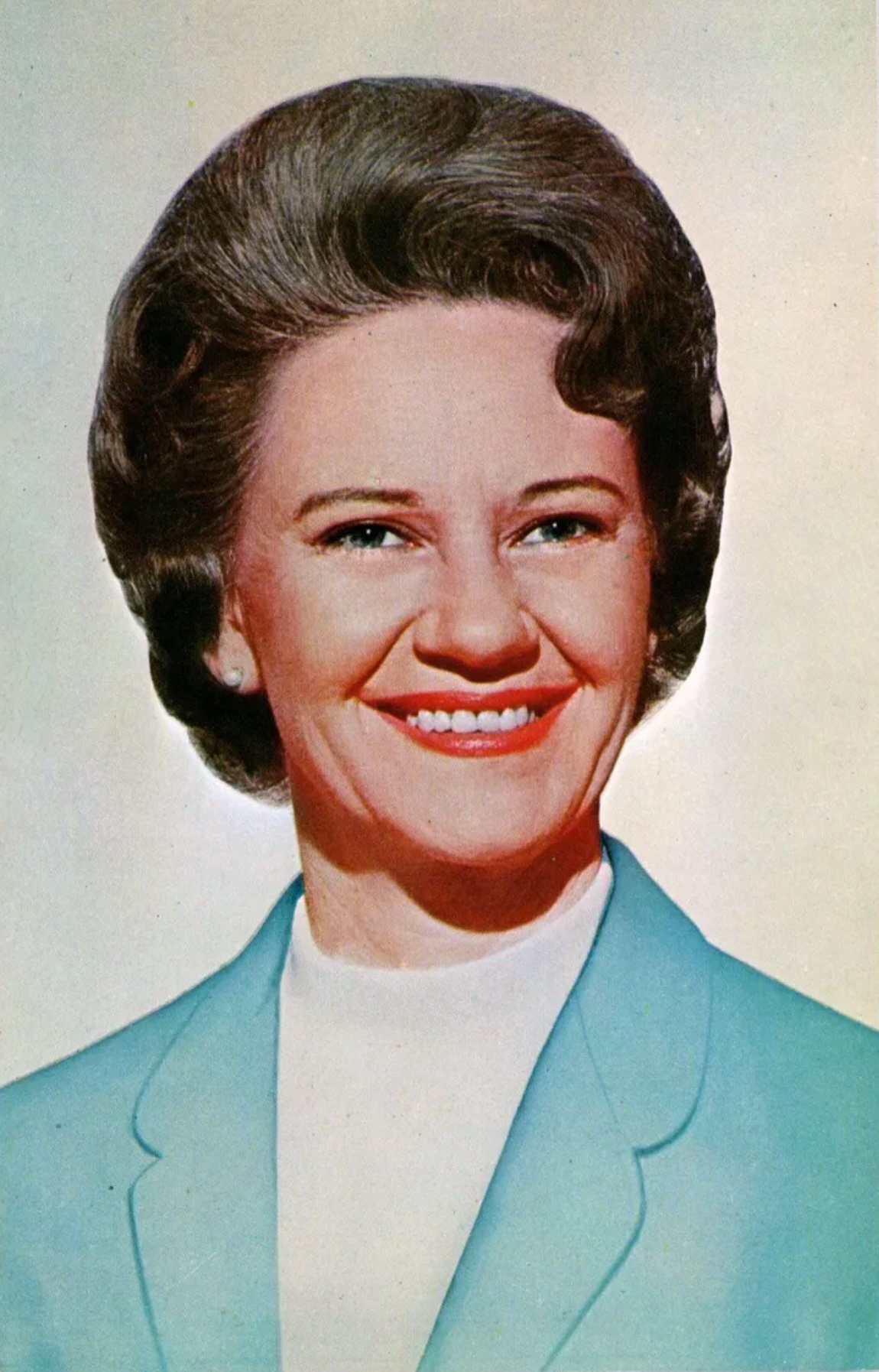

46th Governor of Alabama
- In office January 16, 1967 – May 7, 1968
- Lieutenant: Albert Brewer
- Preceded by: George Wallace
- Succeeded by: Albert Brewer

First Lady of Alabama
- In role January 14, 1963 – January 16, 1967
- Governor: George Wallace
- Preceded by: Florentine Patterson
- Succeeded by: George Wallace (as First Gentleman)

Personal details
- Born: Lurleen Brigham Burns; September 19, 1926 Tuscaloosa, Alabama, U.S.
- Died: May 7, 1968 (aged 41) Montgomery, Alabama, U.S.
- Resting place: Greenwood Cemetery
- Party: Democratic
- Spouse: George Wallace (m. 1943)
- Children: 4, including George III
- Education: Tuscaloosa Business College (attended)
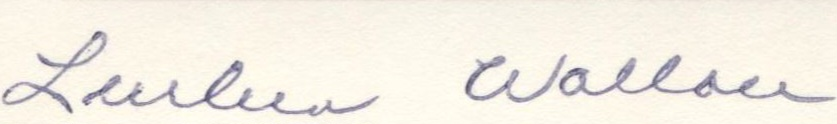
- Signature

Lurleen Burns Wallace (born Lurleen Brigham Burns; September 19, 1926 – May 7, 1968) was an American politician who served as the 46th governor of Alabama for 16 months from January 16, 1967, until her death on May 7, 1968. She was the wife of Alabama governor George Wallace, whom she succeeded as governor. Facing a constitutional restriction that prevented him from serving consecutive terms, George Wallace orchestrated his wife’s candidacy in the 1966 gubernatorial election, openly admitting that she would serve as a figurehead while he retained control over administrative policies and decisions.

Wallace was Alabama's first female governor and was the only woman to hold the governorship until Kay Ivey in 2017. Wallace is also (as of 2026) the only female governor in US history to have died in office, as well as being the first and only female Democrat to have served as governor in Alabama history. In 1973, she was posthumously inducted into the Alabama Women's Hall of Fame.

== Early years ==
Lurleen Brigham Burns was born to Henry Burns and Estelle Burroughs of Fosters in Tuscaloosa, Alabama, on September 19, 1926. She graduated from Tuscaloosa County High School in 1942 at the age of fifteen. She then worked at Kresge's Five and Dime in Tuscaloosa, where she met George Wallace, at the time a member of the United States Army Air Corps. The couple married on May 22, 1943, when she was 16.

Over the next twenty years, George became well-known in Alabama politics for his segregationist views while Lurleen was a mother and a homemaker. The Wallaces had four children: Bobbi Jo Wallace Parsons (1944–2015), Peggy Sue Wallace Kennedy (born 1950), George III (born 1951), and Janie Lee Wallace Dye (born 1961). Due to George Wallace's neglect of his family and frequent extramarital affairs, Lurleen filed for divorce in the late 1950s, later dropping the suit after he promised to be a better husband.

When George was elected to his first of four nonconsecutive governor terms in 1963, Lurleen assumed the duties of First Lady of Alabama in 1963. She opened the first floor of the Alabama Governor's Mansion to the public seven days a week. She refused to serve alcoholic beverages at official functions.

== 1966 gubernatorial election campaign ==
Like most southern US states at the time, Alabama forbade governors from serving two consecutive terms, a provision incorporated in the Alabama Constitution of 1901 (term limit only maintained in Virginia as of 2026). During his first term, George Wallace attempted to lift the ban but was unsuccessful due to opposition in the Alabama Legislature, including from his political rival Ryan deGraffenried Sr. In order to retain power, he offered his wife as a surrogate candidate for governor (though George later succeeded and served three more terms, two of them consecutively).

Amid treatment for cancer, Lurleen Burns Wallace ran in the 1966 Alabama gubernatorial election as "Mrs. George C. Wallace" at the request of George, who wished to remain de facto governor. A similar strategy was used in 1924 by former Texas governor James E. Ferguson with his wife Miriam Wallace Ferguson.

Shy in public and lacking interest in the workings of politics, Lurleen Wallace was described by an Alabama newspaper editor as the most "unlikely candidate imaginable. It is as difficult to picture her in politics as to envision Helen Hayes butchering a hog." She herself said, "It never even crossed my mind that I'd ever enter politics..."

=== Election field ===
The Democratic primary field included two former governors, John Malcolm Patterson and Jim Folsom, former congressman Carl Elliott of Jasper, and Attorney General Richmond Flowers, Sr. Lurleen won decisively with 54% and there was no runoff.

She faced one-term Republican U.S. representative James D. Martin in the general election. Though there had not been a Republican governor of Alabama since 1874, Martin's run was promising and he was expected to win by some political commentators. Martin campaigned with US senator Strom Thurmond and 1964 presidential nominee Barry Goldwater, focusing on the unpopular Vietnam War, inflation, and urban unrest occurring nationally under Democratic President Lyndon B. Johnson, as well as challenging state issues such as George Wallace handling road and school construction with "secret deals", issuing an expensive contract to a friend, and forging "conspiracies between the state house and the White House." Martin bemoaned having to campaign against a woman and proclaimed that Wallace was a "proxy" candidate, a manifestation of her husband's "insatiable appetite for power."

At her general election campaign kickoff in Birmingham, Lurleen Wallace pledged "progress without compromise" and "accomplishment without surrender ... George will continue to speak up and stand up for Alabama." She used the slogan "Two Governors, One Cause" and proclaimed the words Alabama and freedom to be synonyms. It was during this 1966 campaign that George Wallace coined his famous line: "There's not a dime's worth of difference between the two national parties." George Wallace's organization proved insurmountable despite an early poll that placed Martin within range of victory. Wallace had strong support for stemming from his firm opposition to desegregation. Neither candidate sought support from African American voters, many of whom had been registered in the previous year due to the Voting Rights Act.

Lurleen Wallace won with 537,505 votes (63.4 percent). Martin trailed with 262,943 votes (31 percent). A third candidate running to the political left of the major candidates, Dr. Carl Robinson, received 47,655 (5.6 percent). Wallace won every Alabama county besides Greene (which she lost by six votes), and Winston, a predominately Republican county in the North.

== Illness and governorship ==
Lurleen was diagnosed with cancer as early as April 1961, when her surgeon biopsied suspicious tissue that he noticed during the cesarean delivery of her last child. As was common at the time, the physician did not report the finding to Lurleen herself but instead to her husband, who insisted she remain unaware and failed to seek appropriate care for her. When she saw a gynecologist for abnormal bleeding in 1965, her diagnosis of uterine cancer came as a complete shock to her. Lurleen was outraged to learn from one of her husband's aides that campaign staffers had known of her cancer since George's 1962 campaign three years earlier.

Lurleen Wallace cooperated with a policy of dissimulation and misdirection as she underwent radiation therapy in December 1965 and a hysterectomy in January 1966. Since Alabama then lacked adequate cancer treatment facilities, Wallace traveled to the M. D. Anderson Cancer Center in Houston for treatment. Despite her ill health, Wallace maintained an arduous campaign schedule throughout 1966 until she won the election. At the January 1967 inauguration, she gave a 24-minute speech, her longest ever, and stated that her husband would be her "number one assistant."

Early in her term, Wallace's condition began to deteriorate. In June 1967, doctors found an abdominal growth which a July 10 surgery revealed to be an egg-sized malignancy on her colon. She began a second course of radiation therapy. Wallace's most notable independent action as governor was increasing appropriations for the Bryce Hospital and the Partlow State School, a residential institution for the developmentally disabled. She visited both institutions in Tuscaloosa on her own initiative in February 1967 after reading a news story about overcrowding and poor staffing and was horrified by the filthy, barracks-like settings. She also obtained a large funding increase for Alabama state parks.

== Death ==
In January 1968, after extensive testing, Lurleen informed her staff (but not the public) that she had a cancerous pelvic tumor which was pressing on the nerves of her back down through her right hip. Her last public appearances as governor were at the 1967 Blue–Gray Football Classic on December 30 and a January 11 campaign appearance for George's presidential bid on the American Party ticket. The pelvic tumor was removed in late February. This was followed by surgery to treat an abdominal abscess and, in late March 1968, more surgery to dissolve a blood clot in her left lung. By April, the cancer was in her liver and lungs and she weighed less than eighty pounds (36 kg).

George Wallace continued to make campaign stops nationwide during her last weeks of life and persistently lied to the press about her condition, claiming in April 1968 that "she has won the fight" against cancer. On May 5, the day he was to leave for a Michigan appearance, doctors warned him that Lurleen's condition was unstable. She was too ill to be moved back to the hospital, and at her request, George cancelled a May 6 television appearance. She died in Montgomery, Alabama, at 12:34 a.m. May 7, 1968, at home with her husband beside her, the rest of her family, including her parents, just outside her room, and the couple's three youngest children in the next room near it. She was 41 years old.

Wallace lay in state in the Capitol building on May 8, and 21,000 mourners waited as long as five hours to view her silver casket. Despite her emphatic request for a closed casket, George insisted that her body be on view, with a glass bubble over the open part of the coffin. The day of her funeral, May 9, all public and private schools closed except for the Anniston Academy, all state offices closed, and most businesses closed or had abbreviated hours. She was interred at Greenwood Cemetery in Montgomery.

At the time of her funeral, George Wallace had left the governor's mansion and moved into a Montgomery home they had purchased in 1967. He did not take his children with him, instead sending the siblings, ages 18, 16, and 6, to live with family and friends. The Wallaces' eldest daughter had married and left home. George Wallace had two subsequent marriages to Cornelia Ellis Snively and Lisa Taylor, both of which ended in divorce.

Governor Lurleen Wallace was succeeded by Lieutenant Governor Albert Brewer, a one-time ally of her husband who retained the office in the 1970 election with support from President Richard Nixon. George Wallace returned as governor in January 1971, where he remained for two consecutive terms, later returning for a fourth and final term from 1983 to 1987.

== Legacies ==
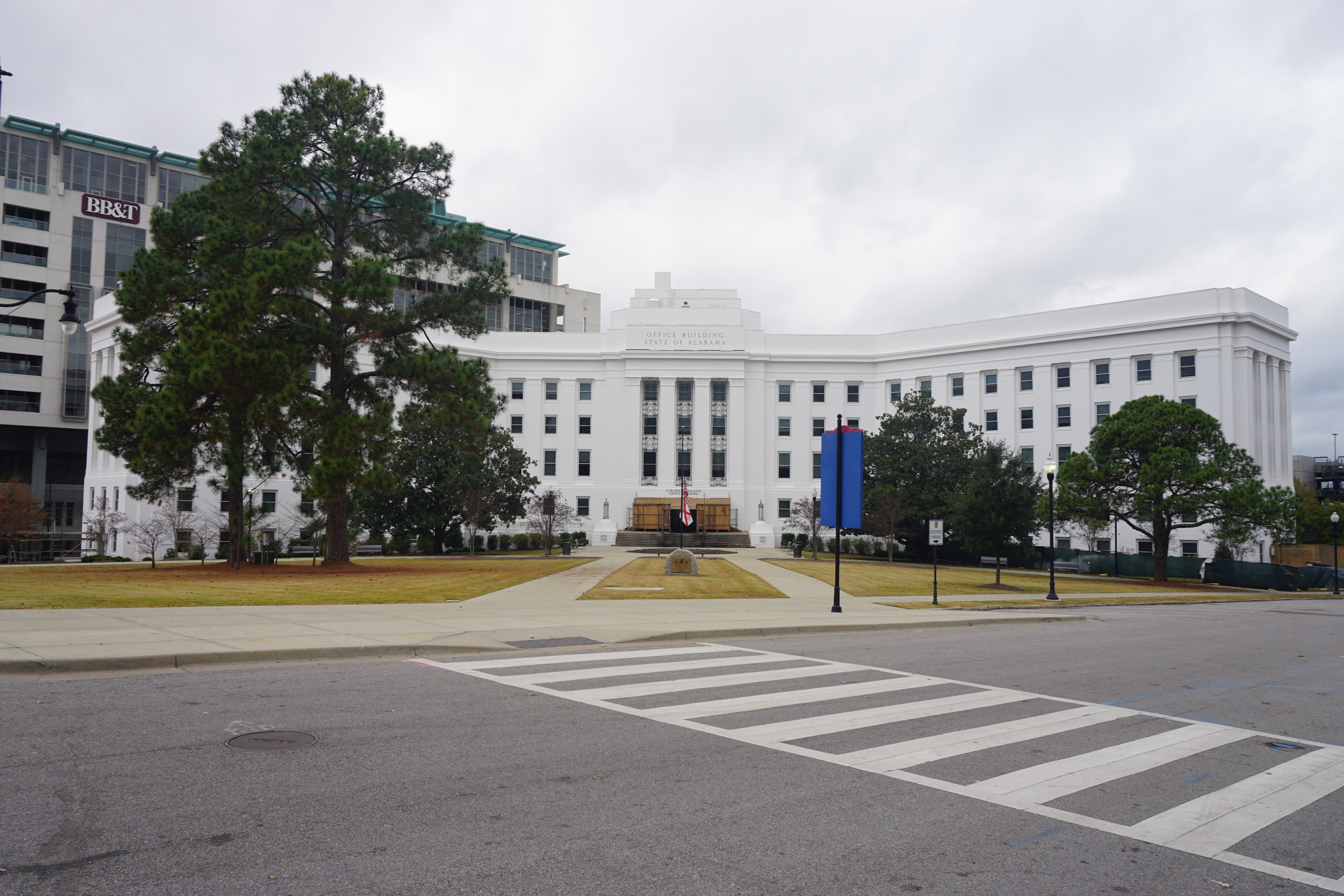
Lurleen Wallace Office Building in Montgomery

In honor of her support for parks, Lake Lurleen and Lurleen B. Wallace Boulevard, both in her native Tuscaloosa County, are named in her memory.

Following Lurleen's death, her successor, Governor Albert Brewer, spearheaded the Lurleen Wallace Courage Crusade to fund and build a new cancer center in Alabama. The University of Alabama Hospital at the University of Alabama at Birmingham was selected as the site for the cancer center, and a formal cancer center program was begun in 1970. Funding was received from the National Cancer Institute, and the center became one of the first eight NCI-designated Comprehensive Cancer Centers. Dr. John Durant served as its first director. Construction of the Lurleen B. Wallace Tumor Institute at the University of Alabama began in 1974 and was completed in 1975, seven years after the death by cancer of Gov. Wallace. The Tumor Institute was then renovated, with the renovation project completing in 2013. The Wallace Patient Tower, an addition to University Hospital, was built in her honor, as was Lurleen B. Wallace Community College in Andalusia, Alabama, and Lurleen B. Wallace Hall on the campus of the University of West Alabama.

Artist Nina Simone sang that "Lurleen Wallace has made me lose my rest" in several live performances of her 1964 civil rights song "Mississippi Goddam".

== See also ==
- List of female governors in the United States

Honorary titles
Preceded by Florentine Patterson	First Lady of Alabama; 1963–1967	Succeeded by George Wallace as First Gentleman of Alabama
Party political offices
Preceded by George Wallace	Democratic nominee for Governor of Alabama; 1966	Succeeded by George Wallace
Political offices
Preceded by George Wallace	Governor of Alabama; 1967–1968	Succeeded by Albert Brewer
