= 1962 United States Senate election in Alabama =

- November 6, 1962
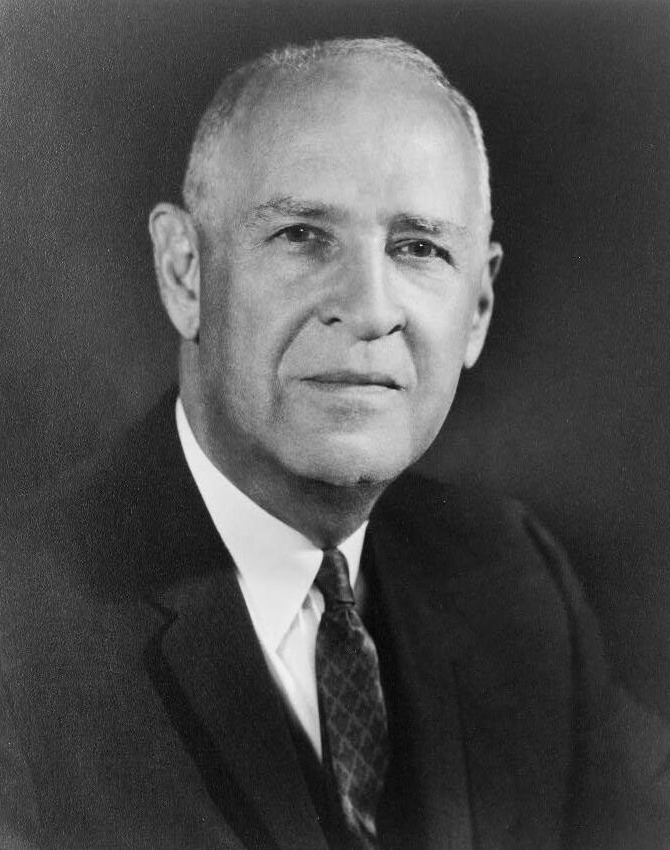

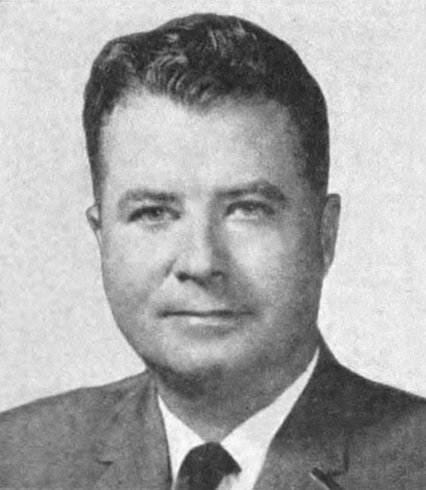
Nominee	J. Lister Hill	James D. Martin
Party	Democratic	Republican
Popular vote	201,937	195,134
Percentage	50.86%	49.14%
- County results Hill: 50–60% 60–70% 70–80% 80–90% Martin: 50–60% 60–70% 70–80%
U.S. senator before election
J. Lister Hill
Democratic
Elected U.S. Senator
J. Lister Hill
Democratic

The 1962 United States Senate election in Alabama was held on November 6, 1962, to elect one of Alabama's members to the United States Senate. Incumbent Democratic U.S. Senator J. Lister Hill won re-election to his fifth, and last, full term.

== Democratic primary ==
=== Candidates ===
- J. Lister Hill, incumbent U.S. Senator since 1938
- Donald Gunter Hallmark
- John G. Crommelin, naval officer, white supremacist and perennial candidate

=== Results ===
Alabama Democratic senatorial primary, 1962
Candidate	Votes	Percentage
J. Lister Hill	363,613	73.7%
Donald Gunter Hallmark	72,855	14.8%
John G. Crommelin	56,822	11.5%
Totals	493,290	100.00%

== Republican primary ==
=== Candidates ===
- James D. Martin, businessman

=== Results ===
James D. Martin ran unopposed in the Republican Primary.

== General election ==
=== Candidates ===
- J. Lister Hill, incumbent U.S. Senator since 1938 (Democratic)
- James D. Martin, businessman (Republican)

=== Campaign ===
In 1962, Hill, a pro-labor New Deal liberal, sought his last term in office but faced an unusually strong Republican opponent in James D. Martin, a petroleum products distributor from Gadsden. Like Hill, Martin supported the Tennessee Valley Authority, a New Deal project begun in 1933. Martin noted that the original sponsor of the inter-state development agency was a Republican U.S. senator, George W. Norris of Nebraska. Martin proposed in the campaign that the TVA headquarters be relocated from Knoxville, Tennessee, to its original point of development, Muscle Shoals, Alabama. Hill had worked to fund other public works projects too, including the deepening of the Mobile Ship Channel, the building of the Gainesville Lock and Dam in Sumter County, and the Tennessee-Tombigbee Waterway, an ultimately successful strategy to link the Tennessee River with the Gulf of Mexico. In the campaign against Martin, Hill said, "If Alabama is to continue the progress and development she has achieved, she cannot do so by deserting the great Democratic Party of Franklin Roosevelt."

Senator Hill pledged to seek renewed funding for the Redstone Arsenal and Marshall Space Flight Center in Huntsville, Alabama, and accused Eisenhower of having neglected the space program while the Soviet Union was placing Sputnik into the atmosphere. Strongly endorsed by organized labor, Hill accused the GOP of exploiting the South to enrich the North and the East and attacked the legacy of former President Herbert Hoover and the earlier "evils" of Reconstruction. Hill predicted that Alabama voters would bury the Republicans "under an avalanche."

The 1962 mid-term elections were overshadowed by the Cuban Missile Crisis. Martin joined Hill in endorsing the quarantine of Cuba but insisted that the problem was an outgrowth of the failed Bay of Pigs Invasion of 1961. Hill said that Soviet premier, Nikita S. Khrushchev, had "chickened out" because "the one thing the communists respect is strength." The New York Times speculated that the blockade ordered by Kennedy may have spared Hill from defeat.

Despite the postwar bipartisan consensus for foreign aid, Martin hammered away at Hill's backing for such programs. He decried subsidies to foreign manufacturers and workers at the expense of Alabama's then large force of textile workers: "These foreign giveaways have cost taxpayers billions of dollars and turned many areas of Alabama into distressed areas." Martin also condemned aid to communist countries and the impact of the United Nations on national policy. He questioned Hill's congressional seniority as of little use when troops were dispatched in the fall of 1962 to compel the desegregation of the University of Mississippi.

The Hill-Martin race drew considerable national attention. The liberal columnist Drew Pearson wrote from Decatur, Alabama, that "for the first time since Reconstruction, the two-party system, which political scientists talk about for the South, but never expect to materialize, may come to Alabama."The New York Times viewed the Alabama race as the most vigorous off-year effort in modern southern history but predicted a Hill victory on the basis that Martin had failed to gauge "bread-and-butter" issues and was perceived by many as an "ultraconservative."

=== Results ===
1962 United States Senate election in Alabama
Party	Candidate	Votes	%
Democratic	J. Lister Hill (incumbent)	201,937	50.86
Republican	James D. Martin	195,134	49.14
Independent	Write-in candidates	8 (Note: These write-in votes were not listed by county)	0.00
Invalid or blank votes			
Total votes		397,079	100.00
Turnout			
Democratic hold			

==== Results by county ====
1962 United States Senate election in Alabama by county
County	Joseph Lister Hill Democratic		James Douglas Martin Republican		Margin		Total votes cast
County	#	%	#	%	#	%	Total votes cast
Autauga	653	35.32%	1,196	64.68%	-543	-29.37%	1,849
Baldwin	2,502	37.04%	4,253	62.96%	-1,751	-25.92%	6,755
Barbour	1,088	44.39%	1,363	55.61%	-275	-11.22%	2,451
Bibb	1,038	49.76%	1,048	50.24%	-10	-0.48%	2,086
Blount	1,961	53.42%	1,710	46.58%	251	6.84%	3,671
Bullock	876	54.48%	732	45.52%	144	8.96%	1,608
Butler	1,291	43.67%	1,665	56.33%	-374	-12.65%	2,956
Calhoun	5,270	60.60%	3,426	39.40%	1,844	21.21%	8,696
Chambers	2,285	68.83%	1,035	31.17%	1,250	37.65%	3,320
Cherokee	1,570	82.46%	334	17.54%	1,236	64.92%	1,904
Chilton	2,395	49.33%	2,460	50.67%	-65	-1.34%	4,855
Choctaw	413	28.21%	1,051	71.79%	-638	-43.58%	1,464
Clarke	902	34.56%	1,708	65.44%	-806	-30.88%	2,610
Clay	1,071	59.20%	738	40.80%	333	18.41%	1,809
Cleburne	702	64.23%	391	35.77%	311	28.45%	1,093
Coffee	2,545	56.42%	1,966	43.58%	579	12.84%	4,511
Colbert	4,859	71.09%	1,976	28.91%	2,883	42.18%	6,835
Conecuh	1,226	42.31%	1,672	57.69%	-446	-15.39%	2,898
Coosa	686	52.49%	621	47.51%	65	4.97%	1,307
Covington	2,175	43.35%	2,842	56.65%	-667	-13.29%	5,017
Crenshaw	1,276	62.83%	755	37.17%	521	25.65%	2,031
Cullman	5,078	54.82%	4,185	45.18%	893	9.64%	9,263
Dale	1,622	47.04%	1,826	52.96%	-204	-5.92%	3,448
Dallas	1,539	35.57%	2,788	64.43%	-1,249	-28.87%	4,327
DeKalb	5,440	54.66%	4,512	45.34%	928	9.32%	9,952
Elmore	1,693	40.44%	2,493	59.56%	-800	-19.11%	4,186
Escambia	1,822	40.46%	2,681	59.54%	-859	-19.08%	4,503
Etowah	8,548	57.14%	6,413	42.86%	2,135	14.27%	14,961
Fayette	1,281	55.33%	1,034	44.67%	247	10.67%	2,315
Franklin	3,054	53.78%	2,625	46.22%	429	7.55%	5,679
Geneva	1,415	47.07%	1,591	52.93%	-176	-5.85%	3,006
Greene	677	59.91%	453	40.09%	224	19.82%	1,130
Hale	899	53.77%	773	46.23%	126	7.54%	1,672
Henry	910	48.05%	984	51.95%	-74	-3.91%	1,894
Houston	1,722	29.64%	4,087	70.36%	-2,365	-40.71%	5,809
Jackson	2,996	79.18%	788	20.82%	2,208	58.35%	3,784
Jefferson	34,691	42.41%	47,102	57.59%	-12,411	-15.17%	81,793
Lamar	1,104	66.15%	565	33.85%	539	32.29%	1,669
Lauderdale	5,856	70.23%	2,482	29.77%	3,374	40.47%	8,338
Lawrence	2,021	74.91%	677	25.09%	1,344	49.81%	2,698
Lee	1,843	56.43%	1,423	43.57%	420	12.86%	3,266
Limestone	2,522	78.37%	696	21.63%	1,826	56.74%	3,218
Lowndes	340	33.90%	663	66.10%	-323	-32.20%	1,003
Macon	1,888	75.01%	629	24.99%	1,259	50.02%	2,517
Madison	7,880	67.63%	3,772	32.37%	4,108	35.26%	11,652
Marengo	633	28.18%	1,613	71.82%	-980	-43.63%	2,246
Marion	1,863	53.12%	1,644	46.88%	219	6.24%	3,507
Marshall	3,573	62.94%	2,104	37.06%	1,469	25.88%	5,677
Mobile	17,067	47.95%	18,528	52.05%	-1,461	-4.10%	35,595
Monroe	1,370	51.02%	1,315	48.98%	55	2.05%	2,685
Montgomery	7,873	42.03%	10,859	57.97%	-2,986	-15.94%	18,732
Morgan	6,125	68.56%	2,809	31.44%	3,316	37.12%	8,934
Perry	600	40.03%	899	59.97%	-299	-19.95%	1,499
Pickens	821	39.68%	1,248	60.32%	-427	-20.64%	2,069
Pike	1,229	44.55%	1,530	55.45%	-301	-10.91%	2,759
Randolph	1,556	62.72%	925	37.28%	631	25.43%	2,481
Russell	821	51.99%	758	48.01%	63	3.99%	1,579
Shelby	2,116	48.04%	2,289	51.96%	-173	-3.93%	4,405
St. Clair	2,418	56.89%	1,832	43.11%	586	13.79%	4,250
Sumter	458	35.02%	850	64.98%	-392	-29.97%	1,308
Talladega	3,649	53.90%	3,121	46.10%	528	7.80%	6,770
Tallapoosa	1,810	54.44%	1,515	45.56%	295	8.87%	3,325
Tuscaloosa	5,573	57.79%	4,071	42.21%	1,502	15.57%	9,644
Walker	5,597	57.10%	4,205	42.90%	1,392	14.20%	9,802
Washington	644	33.59%	1,273	66.41%	-629	-32.81%	1,917
Wilcox	467	38.69%	740	61.31%	-273	-22.62%	1,207
Winston	2,049	42.07%	2,822	57.93%	-773	-15.87%	4,871
Total	201,937	50.86%	195,134	49.14%	6,803	1.71%	397,071

== See also ==
- United States elections, 1962
- United States Senate elections, 1962
