= J. Lister Hill =

American politician (1894–1984)

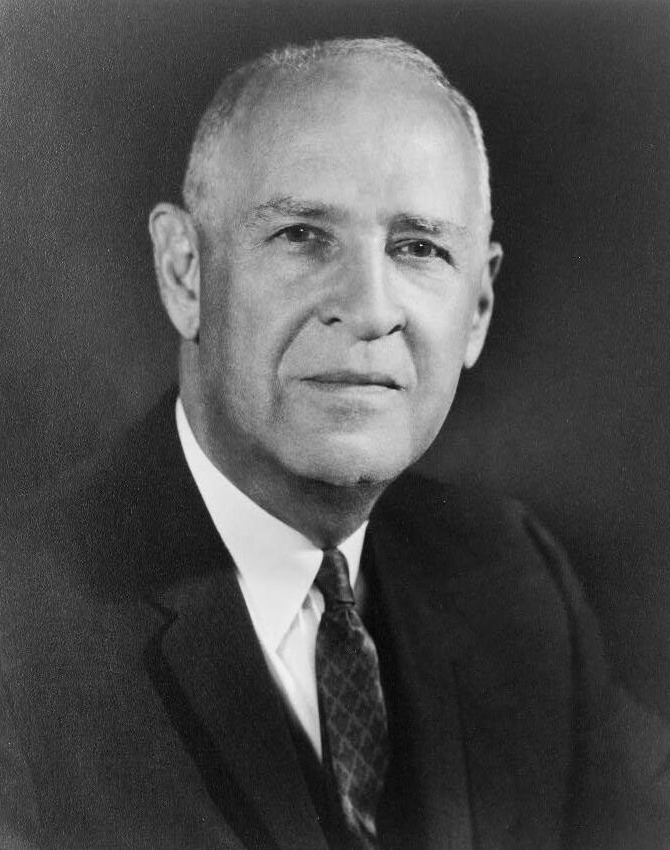

Chair of the Senate Labor Committee
- In office January 3, 1955 – January 3, 1969
- Preceded by: Howard Alexander Smith
- Succeeded by: Ralph Yarborough

Senate Majority Whip
- In office January 3, 1941 – January 3, 1947
- Leader: Alben W. Barkley
- Preceded by: Sherman Minton
- Succeeded by: Kenneth S. Wherry

United States Senator from Alabama
- In office January 11, 1938 – January 3, 1969
- Preceded by: Dixie Bibb Graves
- Succeeded by: James Allen

Member of the U.S. House of Representatives from Alabama's 2nd district
- In office August 14, 1923 – January 11, 1938
- Preceded by: John R. Tyson
- Succeeded by: George M. Grant

Personal details
- Born: Joseph Lister Hill; December 27, 1894 Montgomery, Alabama, U.S.
- Died: December 20, 1984 (aged 89) Montgomery, Alabama, U.S.
- Party: Democratic
- Spouse: Henrietta McCormick
- Children: 2
- Education: University of Alabama, Tuscaloosa (BA, LLB); University of Michigan, Ann Arbor; Columbia University

Military service
- Allegiance: United States
- Branch/service: United States Army
- Years of service: 1917–1919
- Battles/wars: World War I

Joseph Lister Hill (December 27, 1894 – December 20, 1984) was an American attorney and Democratic Party politician who represented Alabama in the United States House of Representatives from 1923 to 1938 and the United States Senate from 1938 to 1969.

As senator, Hill was active on health-related issues and served as Senate Majority Whip from 1941 to 1947. He also served as the Chair of the Senate Committee on Labor from 1955 to 1969. At the time of his retirement, Hill was the fourth-most senior senator. Hill was succeeded by fellow Democrat James Allen.

== Early years ==
Hill was born in Montgomery, Alabama, on December 27, 1894, along with his twin sister, Amelie, to the surgeon Dr. Luther Leonidas Hill Jr. and his wife Lilly. Lister Hill was named after Dr. Joseph Lister, the father of antiseptic surgery. Following his graduation from the Starke University School in Montgomery, he entered the University of Alabama at the age of sixteen and graduated four years later with a BA and law degree and a Phi Beta Kappa key. While a student at the University of Alabama, he was a member of Delta Kappa Epsilon. He also founded the Student Government Association (SGA) and was its first president, the Jasons Senior Men's Honorary (which the university ceased recognizing in 1976 for its all-male policy, but which still taps forty men each spring on the Franklin Mound), and The Machine (the local chapter of Theta Nu Epsilon).

He also studied law at the University of Michigan Law School at Ann Arbor, Michigan, and at Columbia Law School in New York City. He was admitted to the Alabama bar in 1916 and commenced practice in Montgomery and also served as the president of the Montgomery Board of Education from 1917 to 1922.

== Political life ==
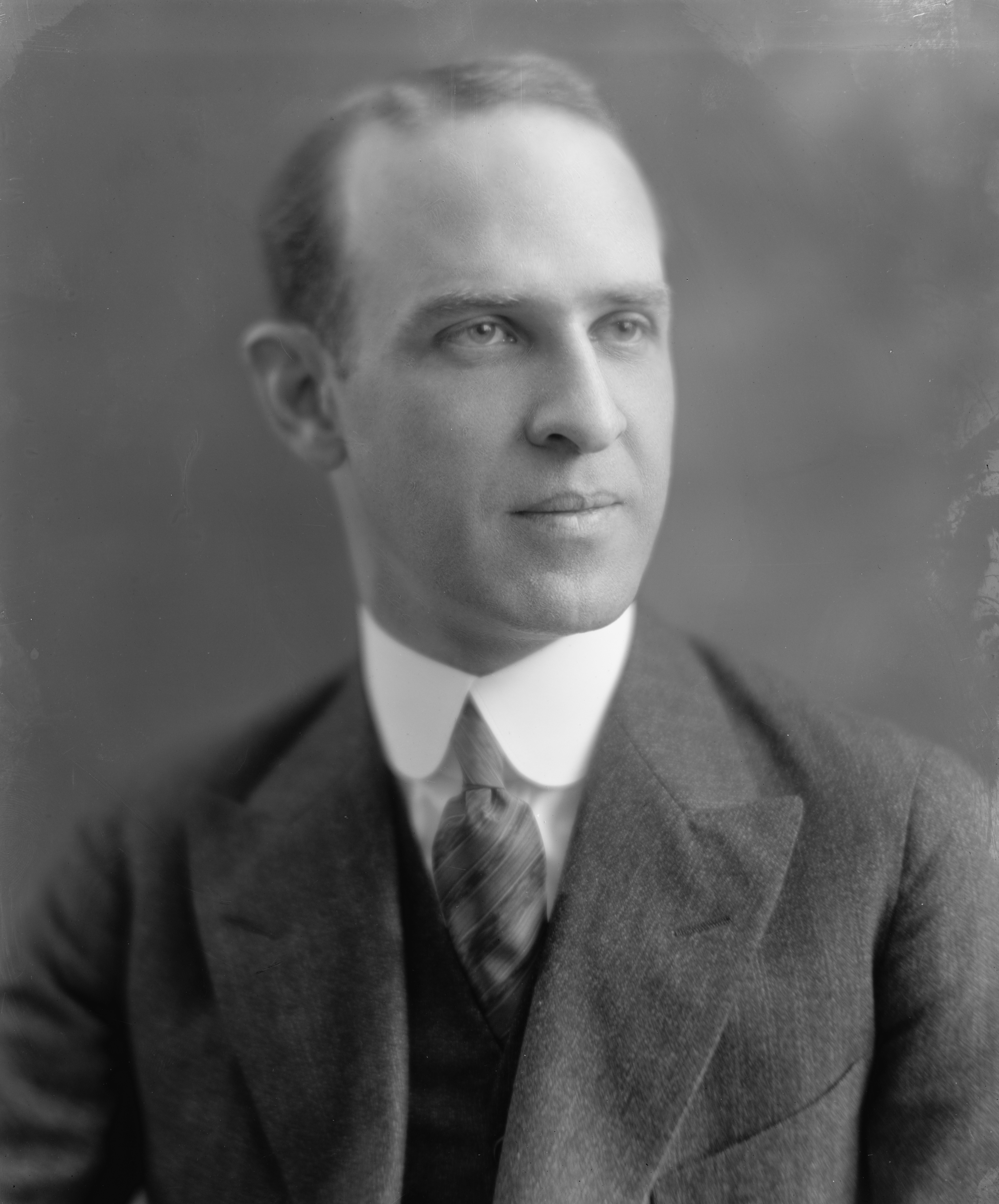
Hill during his time as a member of the House

Hill was elected on August 14, 1923, as U.S. representative from Alabama's 2nd congressional district to fill the vacancy created by the death of John R. Tyson. He served as Chairman of the House Committee on Military Affairs. On January 10, 1938, Hill was appointed to the U.S. Senate as a Democrat to fill the vacancy caused by the resignation of Senator Dixie Bibb Graves for the term ending January 3, 1939; he was subsequently elected on April 26, 1938, to fill the remaining months of the term.

During World War II, Hill supported the interventionist side of America's foreign policy arguments and took an outspokenly "pro-British" stance, both speaking and voting in favor of the Lend-Lease program. On October 23, 1941, he voted in favor of supplemental lend-lease funding to help the British Army. On November 7, 1941, he voted in favor of legislation to amend several sections of the neutrality acts which was intended to make it easier for the United States to provide direct military aid to the United Kingdom during World War II. The British privately described him as "reliably pro-British." He was elected to a full term in November 1938 and re-elected in 1944, 1950, 1956, and 1962. He did not seek re-election in 1968 and retired in January 1969.

A moderate-to-liberal populist Democrat, Hill distinguished himself in a number of fields, but was best known for the Hospital and Health Center Construction Act of 1946, better known as the Hill-Burton Act. He also sponsored the Hill-Harris Act of 1963, providing for assistance in constructing facilities for the intellectually disabled and mentally ill. Additionally, he was recognized as the most instrumental man in Congress in gaining greatly increased support for medical research at the nation's medical schools and other research institution.

He sponsored other important legislation, including the Rural Telephone Act, the Rural Housing Act, the Vocational Education Act, and the National Defense Education Act of 1958. "Hill also used his position and his persistence in improving conditions in rural areas to allot federal funds for rural libraries. For a decade, he worked to provide library service to those with no or inadequate facilities" and was instrumental in passing the Library Services Act which ensured federal funding to support development of libraries in rural areas and dramatically changed the landscape of libraries in terms of viability, sustainability, and quality.

In 1954, Hill signed "The Southern Manifesto" condemning the Supreme Court's 9–0 decision in Brown vs Board of Education ordering school desegregation, but remained a close friend of Supreme Court Justice and fellow Alabamian Hugo Black who voted for the decision. Hill voted against the Civil Rights Act of 1957, the Civil Rights Act of 1960, the Civil Rights Act of 1964, and the Civil Rights Act of 1968, as well as the 24th Amendment to the U.S. Constitution and the Voting Rights Act of 1965.

In 1956 he was honored by the American Library Association for his support of the Library Services Act.

However, Hill was as much a national figure as a representative of Alabama and the South. During his long years in the Congress, he would, from time to time, break with his southern colleagues to follow his own conscience. For example, in opposition to most southerners in the Congress, he favored federal control of offshore oil, with revenue to be earmarked for education.

Hill was the Senate Majority Whip from 1941 to 1947. He was Chairman of the Senate Labor and Public Welfare Committee, which handled important legislation on veterans education, health, hospitals, libraries, and labor-management relations. He was a ranking member of the Senate Appropriations Committee, and a member of the Senate Democratic Policy Committee.

In the 1950s, Hill criticized US President Dwight Eisenhower's attempts to reduce hospital funding that had been granted under the Hill-Burton Act. Hill strongly supported rural electrification and federally subsidized freight rates.

On September 4, 1964, President Lyndon B. Johnson signed the Nurse Training Act of 1964, naming Hill as one of the Members of Congress who pioneered the legislation.

=== The Wherry-Hill Investigation ===
The Wherry–Hill investigation was a 1950 Senate inquiry led by Kenneth S. Wherry and J. Lister Hill into the alleged employment of homosexuals in the federal government. Driven by Cold War fears that gay employees were security risks vulnerable to blackmail, the senators heard testimony from Lt. Roy Blick of the Metropolitan D.C. Police Vice squad who said it was his "own judgement" that there were as many as 3,500 homosexuals employed in Government agencies. Although much of the testimony relied on speculative claims, the investigation led to tighter personnel reporting procedures and helped trigger broader congressional action. It became an early catalyst for what is now known as the Lavender Scare, during which thousands of LGBTQ federal employees were investigated, forced to resign, or dismissed.

There is little evidence of this committee in records aside from press reports and two official published reports.

The Wherry–Hill inquiry contributed to the political pressure that led Dwight D. Eisenhower to issue Executive Order 10450 in 1953. That order expanded federal security requirements and explicitly listed “sexual perversion” as grounds for dismissal—language widely used at the time to target gay men and lesbians. EO 10450 formalized and intensified the exclusionary policies that had gained momentum during the early Cold War investigations, including those initiated by Wherry and Hill.

Executive Order 10450 remained in place for decades and was not formally rescinded in a single sweeping action. However, its discriminatory provisions were effectively dismantled in the 1970s when the U.S. Civil Service Commission ended a ban on gay and lesbian individuals in the federal civil service. In 1995, Bill Clinton issued Executive Order 12968, which removed sexual orientation as a basis for denying or revoking a federal security clearance. In 1998, Clinton strengthened protections further through Executive Order 13087, which explicitly prohibited discrimination based on sexual orientation in federal civilian employment. While EO 10450 technically remained on the books, its anti-gay enforcement structure was rendered legally obsolete beginning in 1995.

Hill's role in the investigation is not typically central to assessments of his career, nor is he remembered as a defining architect of federal anti-LGBTQ policy. Nevertheless, his participation in the 1950 inquiry places him within the early congressional actions that contributed to the institutionalization of discrimination against LGBTQ+ federal employees during the Cold War era and should be noted along with his stance against integration and voting rights over the next 10 years.

=== 1962 campaign ===
In 1962, Hill sought his last term in office but faced an unusually strong Republican opponent in James D. Martin, a petroleum products distributor from Gadsden. Like Hill, Martin supported the Tennessee Valley Authority, a New Deal project begun in 1933. Martin noted that the original sponsor of the interstate development agency was a Republican US Senator, George W. Norris of Nebraska. During the campaign, Martin proposed that the TVA headquarters be relocated from Knoxville, Tennessee, to its original point of development, Muscle Shoals, Alabama. Hill had worked to fund other public works projects too, including the deepening of the Mobile Ship Channel, the building of the Gainesville Lock and Dam in Sumter County, and the Tennessee-Tombigbee Waterway, an ultimately successful strategy to link the Tennessee River with the Gulf of Mexico. In the campaign against Martin, Hill said, "If Alabama is to continue the progress and development she has achieved, she cannot do so by deserting the great Democratic Party."

Hill pledged to seek renewed funding for the Redstone Arsenal and Marshall Space Flight Center in Huntsville, Alabama, and accused former President Eisenhower of having neglected the space program while the former Soviet Union was placing Sputnik into the atmosphere. Strongly endorsed by organized labor, Hill accused the Republicans of exploiting the South to enrich the North and the East and attacked the legacy of former President Herbert Hoover and the earlier "evils" of Reconstruction. Hill predicted that Alabama voters would bury the Republicans "under an avalanche."

The 1962 midterm elections were overshadowed by the Cuban Missile Crisis. Martin joined Hill in endorsing the quarantine of Cuba but insisted that the problem was an outgrowth of the failed Bay of Pigs Invasion of 1961. Hill said that Soviet premier Nikita S. Khrushchev had "chickened out" because "the one thing the communists respect is strength." The New York Times speculated that the blockade ordered by President John F. Kennedy may have saved Hill from defeat.

Despite the postwar bipartisan consensus for foreign aid, Martin hammered away at Hill's backing for such programs. He decried subsidies to foreign manufacturers and workers at the expense of Alabama's then large force of textile workers: "These foreign giveaways have cost taxpayers billions of dollars and turned many areas of Alabama into distressed areas." Martin also condemned aid to communist countries and the impact of the United Nations on national policy. He questioned Hill's congressional seniority as of little use when troops were dispatched in the fall of 1962 to compel the desegregation of the University of Mississippi.

The Hill-Martin race drew considerable national attention. The liberal columnist Drew Pearson wrote from Decatur, Alabama, that "for the first time since Reconstruction, the two-party system, which political scientists talk about for the South, but never expect to materialize, may come to Alabama."The New York Times viewed the Alabama race as the most vigorous off-year effort in modern Southern history but predicted a Hill victory on the basis that Martin had failed to gauge "bread-and-butter" issues and was perceived by many as an "ultraconservative."

Hill defeated Martin by 6,019 votes, 201,937 (50.9 percent) to 195,134 (49.1 percent). Turnout dropped sharply in 1962 compared to 1960, when presidential electors dominated the ballot, and the state split between the national Democratic ticket and unpledged electors who ultimately voted for U.S. Senator Harry F. Byrd, Sr., of Virginia. Nearly 250,000 who had voted in the 1960 U.S. Senate election won by Democrat John Sparkman did not cast ballots in 1962. Hill won thirty-seven of the state's sixty-seven counties. Martin's strong showing enabled him to be elected in 1964 to the U.S. House, representing the 7th District.

== Later life ==
In 1969, Hill was awarded the Public Welfare Medal from the National Academy of Sciences. He received honorary degrees from thirteen colleges and universities, including the University of Alabama and Auburn University. He was a Methodist, a Freemason, a United States Army veteran of World War I—having been assigned to the Seventeenth and Seventy-first United States Infantry Regiments—and a member of the American Legion.

Hill retired from the Senate in 1969, and was succeeded by fellow Democrat James B. Allen of Gadsden, a former lieutenant governor and a leader of his state's conservative faction. Hill died in Montgomery on December 20, 1984, a week before what would've been his 90th birthday, and is interred there at Greenwood Cemetery. Hill is the namesake of the small community of Listerhill, Alabama.

His great-grandson, Joseph Lister Hubbard, is a former member of the Alabama House of Representatives from District 73 in Montgomery, holding office between 2010 and 2014. He was also the Democratic nominee for Attorney General of Alabama in the 2014 elections.

U.S. House of Representatives
Preceded by John R. Tyson	Member of the U.S. House of Representatives from Alabama's 2nd congressional district 1923–1938	Succeeded by George M. Grant
Preceded by John J. McSwain	Chair of the House Military Affairs Committee; 1937–1938	Succeeded by Andrew J. May
U.S. Senate
Preceded by Dixie Bibb Graves	U.S. Senator (Class 3) from Alabama; 1938–1969; Served alongside: John H. Bankhead II, George R. Swift, John Sparkman	Succeeded by James Allen
Preceded by Sherman Minton	Senate Majority Whip; 1941–1947	Succeeded by Kenneth S. Wherry
Preceded by Frederick Van Nuys	Chair of the Senate Executive Expenditures Committee; 1941–1947	Succeeded by George Aiken
Preceded by Howard Alexander Smith	Chair of the Senate Labor Committee; 1955–1969	Succeeded by Ralph Yarborough
Party political offices
Preceded by Hugo Black	Democratic nominee for U.S. Senator from Alabama (Class 3); 1938, 1944, 1950, 1956, 1962	Succeeded by James Allen
Preceded by Sherman Minton	Senate Democratic Whip; 1941–1947	Succeeded by Scott W. Lucas
