= James D. Martin =

American politician (1918–2017)

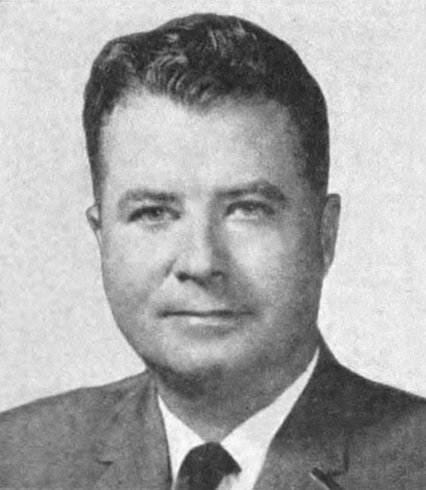
- Martin in 1965

Member of the U.S. House of Representatives from Alabama's 7th district
- In office January 3, 1965 – January 3, 1967
- Preceded by: Carl Elliott (redistricting)
- Succeeded by: Tom Bevill

Personal details
- Born: James Douglas Martin; September 1, 1918 Tarrant, Alabama, U.S.
- Died: October 30, 2017 (aged 99) Gadsden, Alabama, U.S.
- Party: Democratic (before 1962); Republican (1962–2017)
- Spouse: Patricia Martin
- Children: 3
- Education: Birmingham School of Law

James Douglas Martin (September 1, 1918 – October 30, 2017) was an American politician. A member of the Democratic Party and the Republican Party, he served in the United States House of Representatives from 1965 to 1967, representing Alabama's 7th congressional district.

== Life and career ==
Martin was born in Tarrant, Alabama, the son of Richard Martin, a railroad engineer, and Mary Graham, a teacher. He attended Birmingham School of Law, earning his law degree. After earning his degree, he served in the United States Army during World War II, which during his service, he was trained in psychological warfare and interrogations at Camp Ritchie. Together with other Ritchie Boys, he arrived in Europe in December 1944, where he was assigned as an intelligence officer in George S. Patton's army of occupation, until his discharge in 1946.

In 1962, Martin ran as a Republican candidate for United States senator of Alabama. He received 195,134 votes, but lost to Democratic incumbent J. Lister Hill, who won with 201,937 votes. In 1964, Martin was elected to Congress from Alabama's 7th congressional district. Along with Jack Edwards, William L. Dickinson, Glenn Andrews, and John H. Buchanan Jr., Martin was one of five Republicans elected that year, the first Republicans elected to Congress in the state since the end of Reconstruction.

Martin served in the United States House of Representatives from 1965 to 1967. He lost his seat in the House, in 1966, when he ran as a Republican candidate for governor of Alabama. He received 262,943 votes, but lost to Democratic candidate Lurleen Wallace, who won with 537,505 votes.

In 2009, Martin was inducted into the Alabama Academy of Honor.

== Death ==
Martin died on October 30, 2017, at his home in Gadsden, Alabama, at the age of 99.

Party political offices
Vacant Title last held by John A. Posey	Republican nominee for U.S. Senator from Alabama (Class 3); 1962	Succeeded by Perry O. Hooper Sr.
Vacant Title last held by William Longshore	Republican nominee for Governor of Alabama; 1966	Vacant Title next held by Elvin McCary
Vacant Title last held by Winton M. Blount	Republican nominee for U.S. Senator from Alabama (Class 2); Withdrew; 1978	Vacant Title next held by Albert L. Smith Jr.
Preceded by George W. Nichols	Republican nominee for U.S. Senator from Alabama (Class 3); 1978	Succeeded by Jeremiah Denton
Vacant Title last held by Jack Callaway	Republican nominee for Alabama State Treasurer; 1994	Succeeded by Tom Davis
U.S. House of Representatives
Preceded by Carl Elliott	Member of the U.S. House of Representatives from Alabama's 7th congressional district January 3, 1965 – January 3, 1967	Succeeded by Tom Bevill
Honorary titles
Preceded by John S. Wold	Oldest living United States representative (Sitting or former); February 19, 2017 – October 30, 2017	Succeeded by Lester L. Wolff
