= James Allen (Alabama politician) =

American politician (1912–1978)

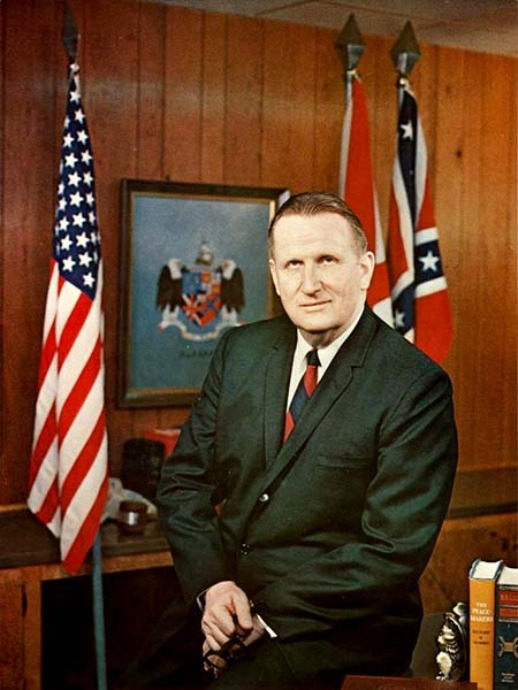
- Official portrait, c. 1963

United States Senator from Alabama
- In office January 3, 1969 – June 1, 1978
- Preceded by: J. Lister Hill
- Succeeded by: Maryon Pittman Allen

17th and 20th Lieutenant Governor of Alabama
- In office January 15, 1951 – January 17, 1955
- Governor: Gordon Persons
- Preceded by: James C. Inzer
- Succeeded by: William G. Hardwick
- In office January 14, 1963 – January 16, 1967
- Governor: George Wallace
- Preceded by: Albert B. Boutwell
- Succeeded by: Albert Brewer

Member of the Alabama Senate
- In office 1946–1950

Member of the Alabama House of Representatives
- In office 1938–1942

Personal details
- Born: James Browning Allen; December 28, 1912 Gadsden, Alabama, U.S.
- Died: June 1, 1978 (aged 65) Gulf Shores, Alabama, U.S.
- Resting place: Forrest Cemetery in Gadsden, Alabama
- Party: Democratic
- Spouse(s): (1) Marjorie Stephens (her death) (2) Maryon Pittman
- Education: University of Alabama; University of Alabama School of Law

Military service
- Allegiance: United States
- Branch/service: United States Navy
- Years of service: 1943–1946
- Unit: Reserves

James Browning Allen (December 28, 1912 – June 1, 1978) was an American Democratic politician serving as U.S. senator representing Alabama. Allen previously served as the lieutenant governor of Alabama and also served in the Alabama Legislature.

Allen was succeeded in the U.S. Senate by his wife, Maryon Pittman Allen.

== Life and career ==
Allen, a Gadsden native, attended the University of Alabama and the University of Alabama School of Law, both located in Tuscaloosa. At the University of Alabama he was a member of Alpha Sigma Phi. He practiced law in Gadsden from 1935 to 1968 and was a member of the Alabama House of Representatives from 1938 to 1942. He resigned from the state legislature to enter active duty in the United States Naval Reserve from 1943 to 1946. He again ran for office after World War II and was a member of the Alabama Senate from 1946 to 1950. He was the 17th and 20th lieutenant governor of Alabama from 1951 to 1955 and again from 1963 to 1967. During his first tenure, he asked the Alabama Legislature to reject federal funding and refuse to comply with school integration following the Brown v. Board of Education decision. He ran for Governor in 1954, but lost in the Democratic primary to former Governor Jim Folsom. Constitutionally barred from a second consecutive term, he would later be elected once more in 1962, becoming the first Lieutenant Governor to be elected more than once. During his second term as Lieutenant Governor, Allen developed a strong political partnership with Governor George Wallace. He was an advocate of racial segregation, and opposed the Civil Rights Act of 1964 and the Voting Rights Act of 1965. In 1964, he met Maryon Pittman Mullins, a journalist from the Birmingham News, for an interview. They quickly fell in love and married four months later.

In 1968, James Allen was elected to succeed the retiring Democratic U.S. Senator J. Lister Hill of Montgomery. Allen won 638,774 (76 percent) to 201,227 (24 percent) for his Republican opponent, Perry O. Hooper, Sr.

Allen was known as one of the most conservative Democrats in the chamber. He was considerably more conservative even than many Republicans of the time. He was an active opponent of the Panama Canal Treaty of 1978. James Allen received one vote for the Republican vice-presidential nomination at the 1976 Republican National Convention.

In March 1974, Allen stated that Governor George Wallace would run in the 1976 Democratic primary and that he believed the Wallace campaign would seek to prevent a repeat of the previous election cycle where the popular vote was not translated into his support from delegates.

Like his Republican Senate colleague, Jesse Helms of North Carolina, Allen was a master of parliamentary procedure. He was considered to have revived the filibuster rule during his nearly ten years as a senator. Following the 1974 midterm elections, Allen pledged to use filibusters against liberal officeholders in favor of large spending in the upcoming 94th United States Congress, reasoning that some of the newly elected Democrats could favor larger spending than the members they had replaced: "I don't feel the voters have given any mandate toward increased expenditures. The people's wishes as indicated by the vote are for us to curtail unnecessary programs and cut Federal spending." It was thought at this time that James Allen "could emerge as a leader of the Senate's conservative bloc with the retirement of Senator Sam J. Ervin, Democrat of North Carolina, and the aging of other conservatives".

In December 1974, James Allen led a group of senators in an anti-busing filibuster against the removal of an amendment previously passed in the House of Representatives designed to curb government enforcement of desegregation orders. The filibuster ended with a two–thirds majority voting 56 to 27 to end debate on language revising the amendment, marking only the 19th time a filibuster was ended in such a manner in Senate history. James Allen stated that the closure move would result in a legislative delay, Hugh Scott replying, "The supplemental is being delayed by the opposition of the Senator from Alabama to the Scott-Mansfield amendment."

James Allen served in the Senate until his death of a heart attack on June 1, 1978, at the resort community of Gulf Shores, Alabama. He is interred at Forrest Cemetery in Gadsden. Governor George C. Wallace, under whom James Allen served previously as lieutenant governor, appointed Allen's widow, Maryon Pittman Allen, to succeed him in the Senate.

The twenty-seventh Senate term for Alabama's Class 3 seat, from January 3, 1975, to January 3, 1981, was unusual in that four senators occupied the seat, beginning with Allen, who died without completing his term.

== See also ==
- List of members of the United States Congress who died in office (1950–1999)

Party political offices
Preceded by Albert Boutwell	Democratic nominee for Lieutenant Governor of Alabama; 1962	Succeeded by Albert Brewer
Preceded by J. Lister Hill	Democratic nominee for U.S. Senator from Alabama (Class 3); 1968, 1974	Succeeded by Donald Stewart
Political offices
Preceded by James C. Inzer	Lieutenant Governor of Alabama; January 15, 1951–January 17, 1955	Succeeded by William G. Hardwick
Preceded by Albert Boutwell	Lieutenant Governor of Alabama; January 14, 1963–January 16, 1967	Succeeded by Albert Brewer
U.S. Senate
Preceded by J. Lister Hill	U.S. senator (Class 3) from Alabama; January 3, 1969–June 1, 1978; Served alongside: John J. Sparkman	Succeeded by Maryon Pittman Allen
