= Julian L. McPhillips =

American lawyer (1946–2025

Julian L. McPhillips Jr.
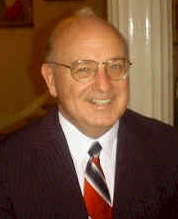

Personal details
- Born: Julian Lenwood McPhillips Jr. November 13, 1946 Birmingham, Alabama, U.S.
- Died: April 12, 2025 (aged 78)
- Party: Democratic
- Spouse(s): Leslie Burton; 3 children
- Relations: Sandra McPhillips Pitre (sister); David McPhillips (brother); Elizabeth McPhillips Williams (sister); Frank Dixon McPhillips (brother)
- Education: Princeton University cum laude with honors in history in 1968; Columbia Law School in 1971
- Profession: Attorney

Julian L. McPhillips Jr. (November 13, 1946 – April 12, 2025) was an American lawyer and was a candidate for Attorney General of Alabama in 1978. In 2002, McPhillips lost out in the Democratic nomination to challenge first-term Republican incumbent Jeff Sessions for a U.S. Senate seat in Alabama.

== Early life ==
Julian McPhillips was the son of (died February 13, 2001) an Episcopalian priest, and Eleanor Elizabeth (née Dixon; died December 1, 2002). He was born in Birmingham, Alabama but raised in Cullman.

His father served in the U.S. Navy during World War II. Julian was an All-American collegiate wrestler at Princeton, twice Eastern AAU heavyweight wrestling champion, and a finalist in the 1972 Olympic Tryouts.

== Political and law career ==
Julian worked as a Wall Street attorney, from 1971 to 1975. He moved back to Alabama in 1975 and began working as Assistant Attorney General under Alabama Attorney General Bill Baxley, specializing in white collar crime prosecution. He left in 1977 and began a campaign for Attorney General that year where he would finish second out of nine candidates for Attorney General in the unofficial results in 1978. He lost his run-off spot in the late changing official vote three days later. After the loss, McPhillips went into private practice.

In 2002, McPhillips lost out in the Democratic nomination to challenge the first-term Republican incumbent, Senator Jeff Sessions for a senate seat in Alabama. He won many counties in the southern part of the state, but Susan Parker won the most counties and Wayne Sowell endorsed Parker for the run off. Parker then lost to Jeff Sessions in the general election. McPhillips was an opponent of elective abortion care.

His brother, Frank D. McPhillips is an attorney in Birmingham, Alabama, a Democrat and a delegate to the 2008 Democratic National Convention.

== Death ==
McPhillips died April 12, 2025, at the age of 78.
