= 2014 United States Senate election in Alabama =

- November 4, 2014
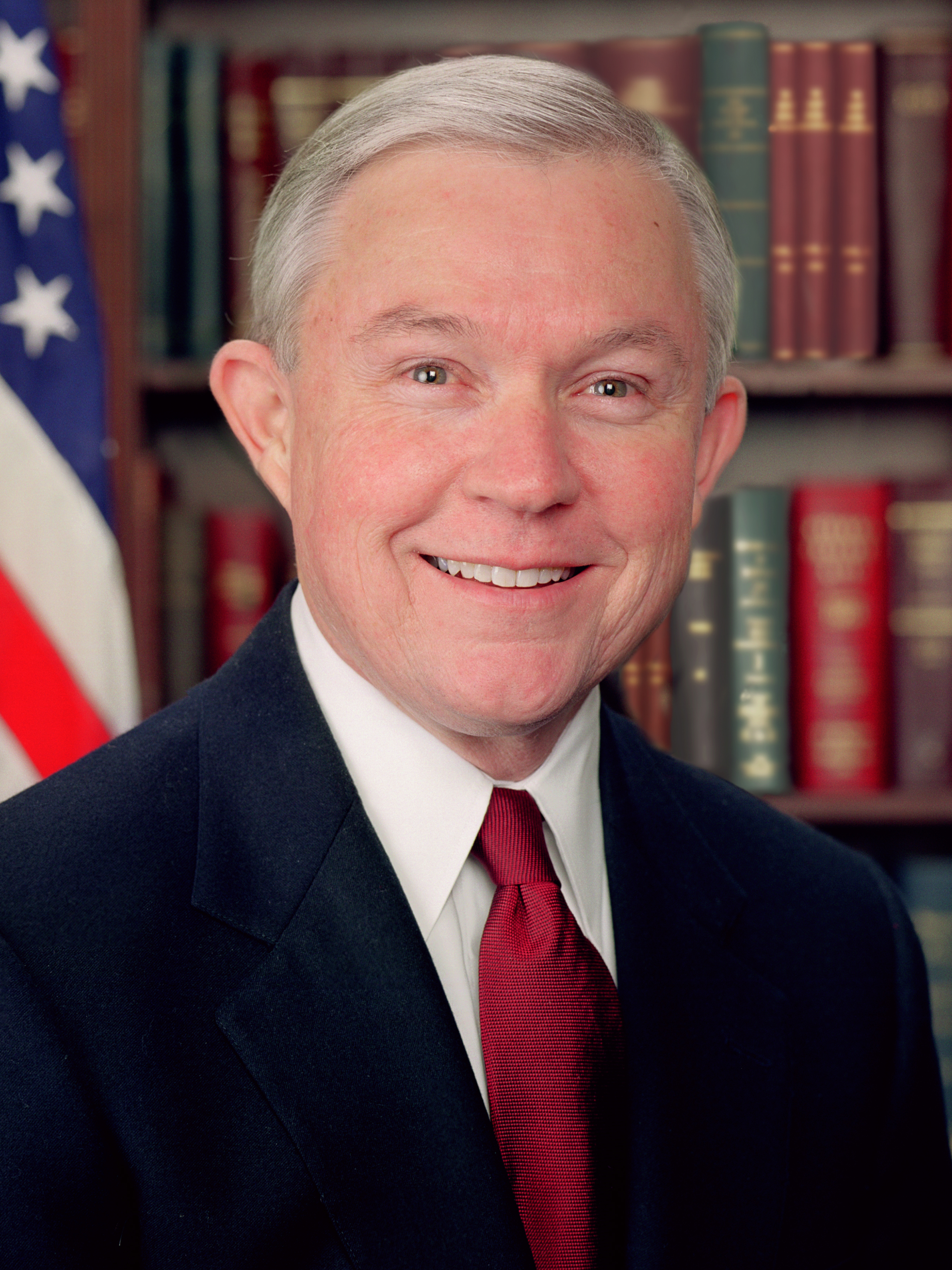
Nominee	Jeff Sessions
Party	Republican
Popular vote	795,606
Percentage	97.25%
- County results Sessions: 80–90% 90–100%
U.S. senator before election
Jeff Sessions
Republican
Elected U.S. Senator
Jeff Sessions
Republican

The 2014 United States Senate election in Alabama took place on November 4, 2014, to elect a member of the United States Senate for Alabama.

Incumbent Republican Senator Jeff Sessions, who served in the position since 1997, ran for re-election to a fourth term in office. As the Democrats did not field a candidate, he was the only candidate to file before the deadline and was therefore unopposed in the Republican primary election and only faced write-in opposition in the general election.

Sessions was re-elected with 97.25% of the vote with the remaining votes being write-ins. This alongside the concurrent gubernatorial election is the last time Jefferson County voted Republican in a statewide election.

As of 2026, this is the last time an incumbent senator was reelected unopposed.

== Republican primary ==
=== Candidates ===
==== Declared ====
- Jeff Sessions, incumbent U.S. Senator since 1997

== Independents ==
An independent candidate would have been able to challenge Sessions if at least 44,828 signatures had been submitted by June 3, 2014. None did so.

== General election ==
=== Candidates ===
==== On ballot ====
- Jeff Sessions (Republican), incumbent U.S. Senator

==== Write-in ====
- Victor Sanchez Williams (Democratic), attorney

=== Fundraising ===
Candidate	Raised	Spent	Cash on hand
Jeff Sessions (R)	$1,369,672	$1,151,690	$3,343,748
Victor Sanchez Williams (D)	$4,497	$4,247	$250

=== Predictions ===
Source	Ranking	As of
The Cook Political Report	Solid R	November 3, 2014
Sabato's Crystal Ball	Safe R	November 3, 2014
Rothenberg Political Report	Safe R	November 3, 2014
Real Clear Politics	Safe R	November 3, 2014

=== Polling ===
Poll source	Date(s) administered	Sample size	Margin of error	Jeff Sessions (R)	Other	Undecided
YouGov	October 16–23, 2014	661	± 6.0%	63%	11%	27%
YouGov	September 20 – October 1, 2014	692	± 4.0%	61%	13%	26%
YouGov	August 18 – September 2, 2014	741	± 5.0%	54%	12%	34%
YouGov	July 5–24, 2014	1,036	± 5.2%	65%	10%	26%

=== Results ===
2014 United States Senate election in Alabama
Party	Candidate	Votes	%
Republican	Jeff Sessions (incumbent)	795,606	97.25%
Write-in		22,484	2.75%
Total votes		818,090	100.00%
Republican hold			

==== By county ====
County	Jeff Sessions Republican		Write-in Various		Margin		Total
County	#	%	#	%	#	%	Total
Autauga	10,345	98.39%	169	1.61%	10,176	96.79%	10,514
Baldwin	39,135	98.22%	710	1.78%	38,425	96.44%	39,845
Barbour	3,475	97.75%	80	2.25%	3,395	95.50%	3,555
Bibb	3,901	98.39%	64	1.61%	3,837	96.77%	3,965
Blount	12,674	98.99%	129	1.01%	12,545	97.98%	12,803
Bullock	852	94.77%	47	5.23%	805	89.54%	899
Butler	3,391	98.29%	59	1.71%	3,332	96.58%	3,450
Calhoun	19,264	97.29%	536	2.71%	18,728	94.59%	19,800
Chambers	4,670	97.33%	128	2.67%	4,542	94.66%	4,798
Cherokee	5,193	98.93%	56	1.07%	5,137	97.87%	5,249
Chilton	9,546	99.09%	88	0.91%	9,458	98.17%	9,634
Choctaw	2,428	98.22%	44	1.78%	2,384	96.44%	2,472
Clarke	5,083	98.45%	80	1.55%	5,003	96.90%	5,163
Clay	3,394	98.29%	59	1.71%	3,335	96.58%	3,453
Cleburne	3,222	98.90%	36	1.10%	3,186	97.79%	3,258
Coffee	8,888	98.70%	117	1.30%	8,771	97.40%	9,005
Colbert	10,065	97.45%	263	2.55%	9,802	94.91%	10,328
Conecuh	2,372	98.02%	48	1.98%	2,324	96.03%	2,420
Coosa	2,434	97.63%	59	2.37%	2,375	95.27%	2,493
Covington	6,496	99.28%	47	0.72%	6,449	98.56%	6,543
Crenshaw	3,159	98.63%	44	1.37%	3,115	97.25%	3,203
Cullman	17,298	99.09%	159	0.91%	17,139	98.18%	17,457
Dale	8,735	98.11%	168	1.89%	8,567	96.23%	8,903
Dallas	4,825	93.69%	325	6.31%	4,500	87.38%	5,150
DeKalb	12,445	99.07%	117	0.93%	12,328	98.14%	12,562
Elmore	16,660	98.51%	252	1.49%	16,408	97.02%	16,912
Escambia	6,323	98.64%	87	1.36%	6,236	97.29%	6,410
Etowah	19,224	97.72%	449	2.28%	18,775	95.44%	19,673
Fayette	5,166	99.10%	47	0.90%	5,119	98.20%	5,213
Franklin	5,185	98.31%	89	1.69%	5,096	96.62%	5,274
Geneva	6,143	98.83%	73	1.17%	6,070	97.65%	6,216
Greene	629	94.87%	34	5.13%	595	89.74%	663
Hale	2,142	97.01%	66	2.99%	2,076	94.02%	2,208
Henry	3,437	98.00%	70	2.00%	3,367	96.01%	3,507
Houston	18,212	98.24%	327	1.76%	17,885	96.47%	18,539
Jackson	8,413	97.92%	179	2.08%	8,234	95.83%	8,592
Jefferson	91,243	94.87%	4,938	5.13%	86,305	89.73%	96,181
Lamar	3,387	98.75%	43	1.25%	3,344	97.49%	3,430
Lauderdale	16,508	96.95%	520	3.05%	15,988	93.89%	17,028
Lawrence	6,091	98.40%	99	1.60%	5,992	96.80%	6,190
Lee	17,514	96.61%	614	3.39%	16,900	93.23%	18,128
Limestone	17,740	97.69%	419	2.31%	17,321	95.39%	18,159
Lowndes	1,344	95.93%	57	4.07%	1,287	91.86%	1,401
Macon	1,133	89.92%	127	10.08%	1,006	79.84%	1,260
Madison	62,126	95.53%	2,906	4.47%	59,220	91.06%	65,032
Marengo	3,408	98.35%	57	1.65%	3,351	96.71%	3,465
Marion	6,467	98.84%	76	1.16%	6,391	97.68%	6,543
Marshall	16,589	98.81%	200	1.19%	16,389	97.62%	16,789
Mobile	51,264	97.19%	1,481	2.81%	49,783	94.38%	52,745
Monroe	3,688	98.56%	54	1.44%	3,634	97.11%	3,742
Montgomery	27,252	94.56%	1,567	5.44%	25,685	89.13%	28,819
Morgan	23,008	98.21%	420	1.79%	22,588	96.41%	23,428
Perry	1,079	96.86%	35	3.14%	1,044	93.72%	1,114
Pickens	3,652	97.75%	84	2.25%	3,568	95.50%	3,736
Pike	5,949	97.32%	164	2.68%	5,785	94.63%	6,113
Randolph	4,119	98.64%	57	1.36%	4,062	97.27%	4,176
Russell	4,756	95.87%	205	4.13%	4,551	91.74%	4,961
Shelby	42,275	97.90%	906	2.10%	41,369	95.80%	43,181
St. Clair	16,648	98.75%	210	1.25%	16,438	97.51%	16,858
Sumter	1,206	95.94%	51	4.06%	1,155	91.89%	1,257
Talladega	12,465	97.51%	318	2.49%	12,147	95.02%	12,783
Tallapoosa	8,552	98.68%	114	1.32%	8,438	97.37%	8,666
Tuscaloosa	27,260	96.21%	1,074	3.79%	26,186	92.42%	28,334
Walker	13,600	98.10%	264	1.90%	13,336	96.19%	13,864
Washington	3,393	99.04%	33	0.96%	3,360	98.07%	3,426
Wilcox	1,494	97.77%	34	2.23%	1,460	95.55%	1,528
Winston	5,572	99.08%	52	0.92%	5,520	98.15%	5,624
Totals	795,606	97.25%	22,484	2.75%	773,122	94.50%	818,090

Counties that flipped from Democratic to Republican

- Bullock (largest municipality: Union Springs)
- Sumter (largest municipality: Livingston)
- Greene (largest municipality: Eutaw)
- Hale (largest municipality: Moundville)
- Perry (largest municipality: Marion)
- Dallas (largest municipality: Selma)
- Lowndes (largest municipality: Fort Deposit)
- Montgomery (largest municipality: Montgomery)
- Macon (largest municipality: Tuskegee)
- Russell (largest city: Phenix City)
- Wilcox (largest municipality: Camden)

== Aftermath ==
Sessions did not complete this term, which ran through January 3, 2021; he resigned on February 9, 2017, to become Attorney General under the Trump administration. This triggered the interim appointment of Luther Strange to fill the vacancy until Democrat Doug Jones won a special election later that year. On November 7, 2019, Sessions announced that he would stand for this US Senate seat again in 2020 when it was due for its regularly scheduled election, though he was defeated in the runoff primary by football coach Tommy Tuberville, who would go onto win the general election.

== See also ==
- 2014 Alabama elections
- 2014 United States Senate elections
- 2014 United States elections
