= Susan Parker =

American politician (born 1955)

Member of the Alabama Public Service Commission Seat 2
- In office January 15, 2007 – January 17, 2011
- Governor: Bob Riley
- Preceded by: George Wallace
- Succeeded by: Terry Dunn

37th Auditor of Alabama
- In office January 18, 1999 – January 20, 2003
- Governor: Don Siegelman
- Preceded by: Pat Duncan
- Succeeded by: Beth Chapman

Personal details
- Born: September 30, 1955 (age 70) Eva, Alabama, U.S.
- Party: Democratic
- Education: Calhoun Community College (attended); Athens State University (BS); University of Alabama (MA, PhD)

Susan D. Parker (born September 30, 1955) is an American Democratic politician from Alabama. A resident of Rogersville, Parker was elected Alabama State Auditor in 1998 and served until 2002.

== Birth ==
Susan Parker was born on September 30, 1955, in Eva, Alabama.

== Education ==
Parker received an AS from Calhoun Community College in 1975(a977), a BS from Athens State College and an MA from the University of Alabama in 1977, and a Ph.D., in Higher Education Administration of Higher Education from the University of Alabama in 1985. She completed a program of alternate studies at Memphis Theological Seminary in 2014.

== Professional experience ==
Parker was an Administrator, Calhoun Community College, 1972–1988, Chief Development Officer/Assistant to the President, Athens State College, 1988–1996, and President, Parker Plus Consulting, 1996–1998, Ordained as a minister by the Cumberland Presbyterian Church, April, 2014, Interim President, Memphis Theological Seminary 2018-2019

== Politics ==
Parker was elected as Alabama State Auditor in 1998. She did not seek reelection in 2002, and was succeeded in office by Republican Beth Chapman.

In 2002 Parker was the first woman in Alabama to be nominated for a Senate seat when she defeated Julian L. McPhillips in the Democratic primary. Commentators drew attention to the perceived sexism of McPhillips who questioned whether Parker was fit to consider family issues because she had no children of her own. She lost the general election to incumbent Republican Senator Jeff Sessions, winning 40% of votes against Sessions' 59%. In 2003, Parker campaigned for Amendment 1 to the Alabama Constitution, a referendum which proposed, inter alia, new sources of funding for public education, a measure that was defeated at the polls. .

In 2006, Parker defeated former state Representative Perry Hooper Jr., of Montgomery for the Place 2 position on the Alabama Public Service Commission. Though Hooper had defeated former state Senator John Amari of Trussville in the Republican primary, he lost to Parker in the general election.

She had been mentioned as a possible candidate for Lieutenant Governor of Alabama in the 2010 election, but declined and instead lost her reelection bid for the Public Service Commission to Republican Terry L. Dunn.

== See also ==
- United States Senate elections, 2002

Party political offices
Preceded by Charley Baker	Democratic nominee for Auditor of Alabama; 1998	Succeeded by Carolyn Gibson
Preceded by Roger Bedford	Democratic nominee for U.S. Senator from Alabama (Class 3); 2002	Succeeded by Vivian Figures
Political offices
Preceded by Pat Duncan	Auditor of Alabama; 1999–2003	Succeeded by Beth Chapman
Preceded by George Wallace	Member of the Alabama Public Service Commission; Seat 2; 2007–2011	Succeeded by Terry Dunn
