= Jeff Sessions =

American politician and attorney (born 1946)

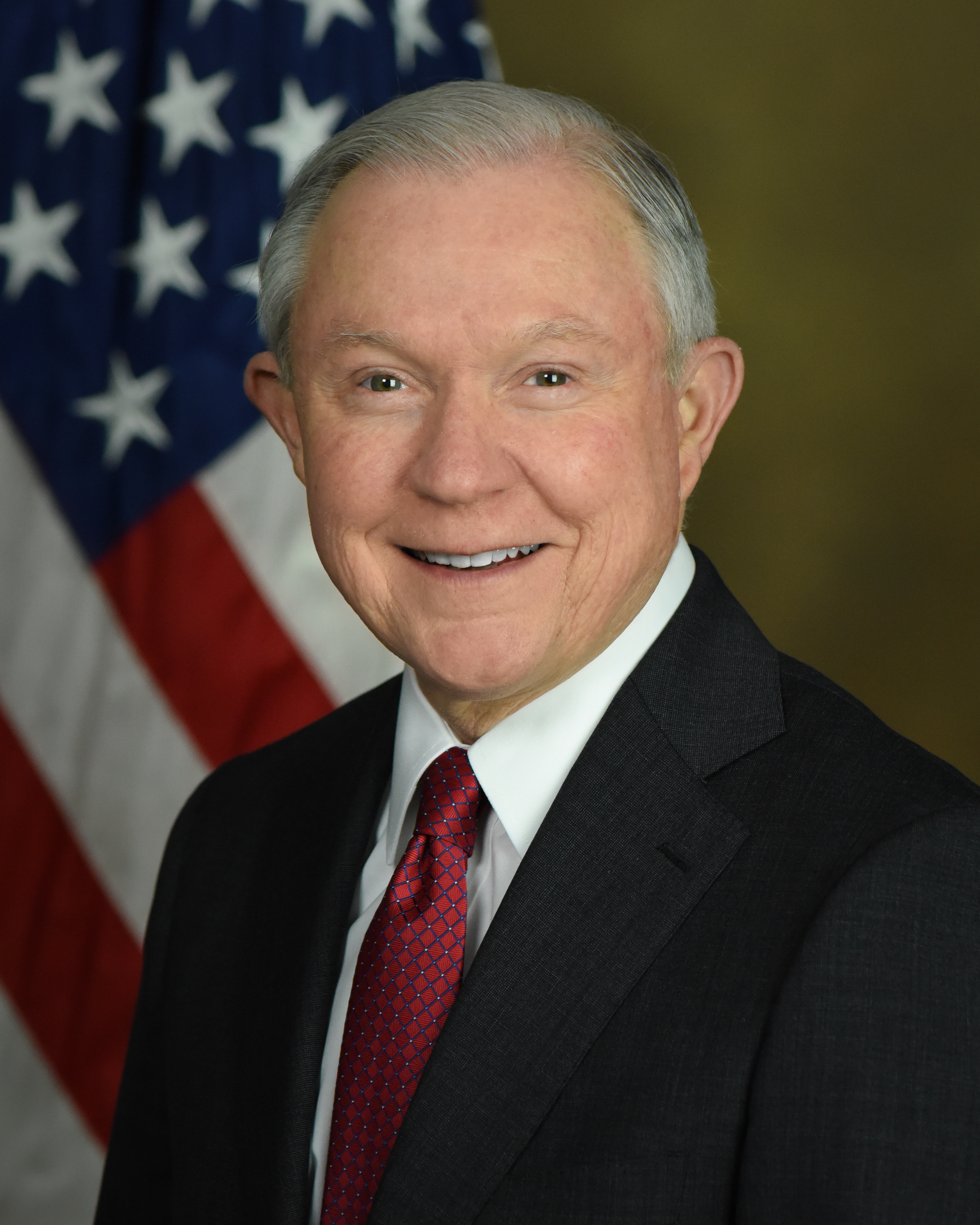
- Official portrait, 2017

84th United States Attorney General
- In office February 9, 2017 – November 7, 2018
- President: Donald Trump
- Deputy: Dana Boente (acting); Rod Rosenstein
- Preceded by: Loretta Lynch
- Succeeded by: William Barr

United States Senator from Alabama
- In office January 3, 1997 – February 8, 2017
- Preceded by: Howell Heflin
- Succeeded by: Luther Strange

44th Attorney General of Alabama
- In office January 16, 1995 – January 3, 1997
- Governor: Fob James
- Preceded by: Jimmy Evans
- Succeeded by: William H. Pryor Jr.

United States Attorney for the Southern District of Alabama
- In office February 1981 – March 23, 1993
- President: Ronald Reagan; George H. W. Bush; Bill Clinton
- Preceded by: William Kimbrough
- Succeeded by: Don Foster

Personal details
- Born: Jefferson Beauregard Sessions III; December 24, 1946 (age 79) Selma, Alabama, U.S.
- Party: Republican
- Spouse: Mary Blackshear (m. 1969)
- Children: 3
- Education: Huntingdon College (BA); University of Alabama (JD)

Military service
- Branch/service: United States Army; Army Reserve
- Years of service: 1973–1977
- Rank: Captain
- Unit: 1184th United States Army Transportation Terminal Unit
- Sessions's voice Sessions delivering his first message to U.S. Justice Department employees as attorney general Recorded February 10, 2017

Jefferson Beauregard Sessions III (born December 24, 1946) is an American politician and attorney who served as the 84th United States attorney general from 2017 to 2018. A member of the Republican Party, he previously served as United States senator from Alabama from 1997 to 2017 before resigning that position to serve as attorney general in the first administration of President Donald Trump. Trump fired Sessions in 2018 due to his inaction and recusal from the Russian collusion probes.

From 1981 to 1993, Sessions served as the U.S. attorney for the Southern District of Alabama. In 1986, President Ronald Reagan nominated Sessions to a judgeship on the U.S. District Court for the Southern District of Alabama. After allegations of racism were made against him in testimony before the U.S. Senate Judiciary Committee, which Sessions denied, the committee voted against advancing his nomination to the Senate floor; the nomination was later withdrawn. Sessions was elected attorney general of Alabama in 1994. In 1996, he was elected to the U.S. Senate, and was re-elected in 2002, 2008 and 2014. During his Senate tenure, Sessions was considered one of the most conservative senators. His Senate voting record includes votes against comprehensive immigration reform (2006), the 2008 bank bailout, the American Recovery and Reinvestment Act of 2009, the Affordable Care Act (2009) and criminal justice reform (2015).

Sessions was an early supporter of Trump's 2016 presidential campaign; he was nominated by Trump for the post of U.S. Attorney General. He was confirmed and sworn in as attorney general in February 2017. In his confirmation hearings, Sessions stated under oath that he did not have contact with Russian officials during the 2016 presidential campaign and that he was unaware of any contact between Trump campaign members and Russian officials. However, in March 2017, news reports revealed that Sessions had twice met with Russian ambassador Sergey Kislyak in 2016. Sessions later recused himself from any investigations into Russian interference in the 2016 United States elections. As attorney general, Sessions rescinded a memo issued by one of his predecessors, Eric Holder, that had sought to curb mass incarceration by avoiding mandatory sentencing for drug crimes; he ordered federal prosecutors to begin seeking the maximum criminal charges possible. A staunch opponent of illegal immigration, Sessions adopted a hard line on sanctuary cities and told reporters that cities failing to comply with federal immigration policy would lose federal funding. He also played a key role in the implementation of the Trump administration family separation policy. Trump issued an executive order revoking the cities' funding, but that order was overturned by a federal court. Sessions also supported Department of Justice prosecutions of medical marijuana providers.

On November 7, 2018, Sessions tendered his resignation at Trump's request following months of public and private conflict with President Trump over his recusal from investigations relating to Russian election interference. Sessions ran in the 2020 Senate election in Alabama to reclaim his old seat but lost in the Republican primary to Tommy Tuberville, who was supported by President Trump.

== Early life and early career ==
Sessions was born in Selma, Alabama, on December 24, 1946, the son of Jefferson Beauregard Sessions Jr. and the former Abbie Powe. Sessions, his father, and his grandfather were named after Jefferson Davis, a U.S. senator and president of the Confederate States of America, and P. G. T. Beauregard, a veteran of the Mexican–American War and a Confederate general who oversaw the Battle of Fort Sumter that commenced the American Civil War. His father owned a general store in Hybart, Alabama, and later owned a farm equipment dealership. In 1964, Sessions became an Eagle Scout, and later, he earned the Distinguished Eagle Scout Award for his many years of service.

After attending Wilcox County High School in nearby Camden, Sessions studied at Huntingdon College in Montgomery, graduating with a Bachelor of Arts in 1969. He was active in the Young Republicans, the marching band and was student body president. Sessions attended the University of Alabama School of Law and graduated with a Juris Doctor in 1973.

Sessions entered the private practice of law in Russellville and later in Mobile. He also served in the Army Reserve in the 1970s with the rank of captain.

== U.S. attorney for the Southern District of Alabama (1981–1993) ==
Sessions served as an assistant United States attorney in the Office of the U.S. Attorney for the Southern District of Alabama beginning in 1975. In 1981, President Reagan nominated him to be the U.S. attorney for the Southern District of Alabama. The Senate confirmed him and he held that position for twelve years. In 1993, Sessions resigned his post after Democrat Bill Clinton was elected President of the United States.

Sessions's office filed civil rights charges in the 1981 killing of Michael Donald, a young African American man who was murdered in Mobile, Alabama, by a pair of Ku Klux Klan members. Sessions's office did not prosecute the case, as homicide is prosecuted by the state government, but both men were arrested and convicted.

In 1985, Sessions prosecuted three African American community organizers in the Black Belt of Alabama, including Martin Luther King Jr.'s former aide Albert Turner, for voter fraud, alleging tampering with 14 absentee ballots. The prosecution stirred charges of selective prosecution of black voter registration. The defendants, known as the Marion Three, were acquitted of all charges by a jury after three hours of deliberation. Historian Wayne Flynt told The Washington Post he regarded concerns about tactics employed in the 1984 election and by Turner in particular as legitimate, but also noted Sessions had no history of advocating for black voter rights before 1984. Interviewed in 2009, Sessions said he remained convinced that he did the right thing, but admitted he "failed to make the case".

== Failed nomination for federal trial court judgeship (1986) ==
In 1986, Reagan nominated Sessions to be a United States district judge of the United States District Court for the Southern District of Alabama. Sessions's judicial nomination was recommended and actively backed by Republican Alabama senator Jeremiah Denton. A substantial majority of the American Bar Association Standing Committee on the Federal Judiciary, which rates nominees to the federal bench, rated Sessions "qualified", with a minority voting that Sessions was "not qualified". His nomination was opposed by the NAACP, the Leadership Conference on Civil Rights, and People for the American Way.

At Sessions's confirmation hearings before the Senate Judiciary Committee, four Department of Justice lawyers who had worked with Sessions testified that he made racially offensive remarks. One of those lawyers, J. Gerald Hebert, testified that Sessions had referred to the National Association for the Advancement of Colored People (NAACP) and the American Civil Liberties Union (ACLU) as "un-American" and "Communist-inspired" (Sessions said he was referring to their support of the Sandinistas) and that they did more harm than good by trying to force civil rights "down the throats of people". Hebert, a civil rights lawyer, said that he did not consider Sessions a racist, and that Sessions "has a tendency sometimes to just say something, and I believe these comments were along that vein." Hebert also said that Sessions had called a white civil rights attorney "maybe" a "disgrace to his race". Sessions said he did not recall making that remark and he did not believe it.

Thomas Figures, a black assistant U.S. attorney, testified that Sessions said he thought the Ku Klux Klan was "OK until I found out they smoked pot". Sessions later said that the comment was not serious, but did apologize for it, saying that he considered the Klan to be "a force for hatred and bigotry". Barry Kowalski, a prosecutor in the civil rights division, also heard the remark and testified that prosecutors working such a gruesome case sometimes "resort to operating room humor and that is what I considered it to be". Another DOJ lawyer, Albert Glenn, said, "It never occurred to me that there was any seriousness to it." Figures testified that on one occasion, when the U.S. Department of Justice Civil Rights Division sent the office instructions to investigate a case that Sessions had tried to close, Figures and Sessions "had a very spirited discussion regarding how the Hodge case should then be handled; in the course of that argument, Mr. Sessions threw the file on a table, and remarked, 'I wish I could decline on all of them'", by which Figures said Sessions meant civil rights cases generally. Kowalski, however, testified that he believed "[Sessions] was eager to see that justice was done in the area of criminal civil rights prosecutions."

Figures also said that Sessions had called him "boy", which Sessions denied. Figures testified that two assistant prosecutors had also heard Sessions, including current federal judge Ginny Granade. Granade denied this. He also testified that "Mr. Sessions admonished me to 'be careful what you say to white folks.'" Sessions denied this. In 1992, Figures was charged with attempting to bribe a witness by offering $50,000 to a convicted drug dealer who was to testify against his client. Figures claimed the charge was retaliation for his role in blocking the Sessions nomination. Sessions denied this, saying that he recused himself from the case. Figures was ultimately acquitted.

Hebert, Kowalski and Daniel Bell, deputy chief of the criminal section in the Civil Rights Division, testified that they considered Sessions to have been more welcoming to the work of the Civil Rights Division than many other Southern U.S. attorneys at the time. Sessions has always defended his civil rights record, saying that "when I was [a U.S. attorney], I signed 10 pleadings attacking segregation or the remnants of segregation, where we as part of the Department of Justice, we sought desegregation remedies." Critics later argued that Sessions had exaggerated his involvement in civil rights cases. Michigan Law professor Samuel Bagenstos, reviewing Sessions's claims, argued that "[a]ll this shows is that Sessions didn't completely refuse to participate in or have his name on pleadings in cases that the civil rights division brought during his tenure ... These four cases are awfully weak evidence of Sessions's supposed commitment to civil rights."

Coretta Scott King, the widow of Martin Luther King Jr. wrote to the Senate Judiciary Committee to oppose the nomination. In her letter, she wrote that "Mr. Sessions has used the awesome powers of his office in a shabby attempt to intimidate and frighten elderly black voters."

On June 5, 1986, the committee voted 10–8 against recommending the nomination to the Senate floor, with Republican senators Charles Mathias of Maryland and Arlen Specter of Pennsylvania voting with the Democrats. It then split 9–9 on a vote to send Sessions's nomination to the Senate floor with no recommendation, this time with Specter in support. A majority was required for the nomination to proceed. The pivotal votes against Sessions came from his home state's Democratic senator Howell Heflin of Alabama. Although Heflin had previously backed Sessions, he began to oppose Sessions after hearing testimony, concluding that there were "reasonable doubts" over Sessions's ability to be "fair and impartial". The nomination was withdrawn on July 31, 1986.

Sessions became only the second nominee to the federal judiciary in 48 years whose nomination was killed by the Senate Judiciary Committee. He was quoted then as saying that the Senate on occasion had been insensitive to the rights and reputation of nominees. A law clerk from the U.S. District Court in Mobile who had worked with Sessions later acknowledged the confirmation controversy, but stated that he observed Sessions as "a lawyer of the highest ethical and intellectual standards".

When Senator Arlen Specter of Pennsylvania left the GOP to join the Democratic Party on April 28, 2009, Sessions was selected to be the ranking member on the Senate Judiciary Committee. At that time, Specter said that his vote against Sessions's 1986 federal judicial nomination had been a mistake, adding that he had later found Sen. Sessions to be an "egalitarian".

== Alabama attorney general (1995–1997) ==
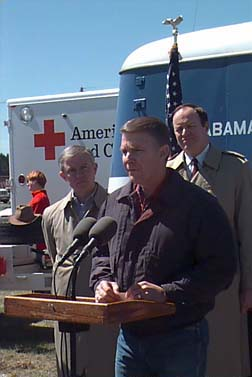
Senators Sessions and Richard Shelby with FEMA Director James Lee Witt, 1998

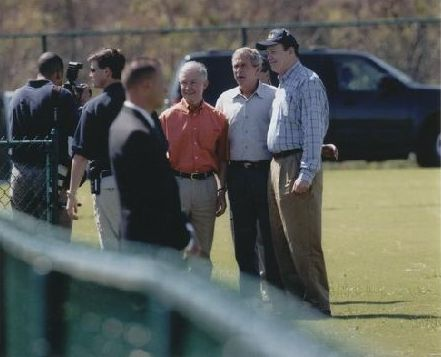
Senators Sessions and Richard Shelby meet with President George W. Bush, 2004

Sessions was elected attorney general of Alabama in November 1994, unseating incumbent Democrat Jimmy Evans with 57% of the vote. The harsh criticism he had received from Senator Ted Kennedy, who called him a "throw-back to a shameful era" and a "disgrace", was considered to have won him the support of Alabama conservatives.

As attorney general, Sessions defended the state in a litigation that challenged the funding system for Alabama's public schools. The litigation resulted in the creation of a new funding system after "Judge Eugene W. Reese found the state's education funding unconstitutional and ordered lawmakers to come up with a system to remedy inequities between rich and poor schools."

As attorney general in 1995, Sessions defended a newly passed state law denying access to meeting space and student group funding for Gay-Straight Alliances at the state's public universities, stating that "an organization that professes to be comprised of homosexuals and/or lesbians may not receive state funding or use state-supported facilities to foster or promote those illegal, sexually deviant activities defined in the sodomy and sexual misconduct laws." The U.S. District court ruled against the state law as a violation of the First Amendment to the U.S. Constitution in Gay Lesbian Bisexual Alliance v. Sessions, 917 F. Supp. 1548 (1996).

== U.S. Senate (1997–2017) ==
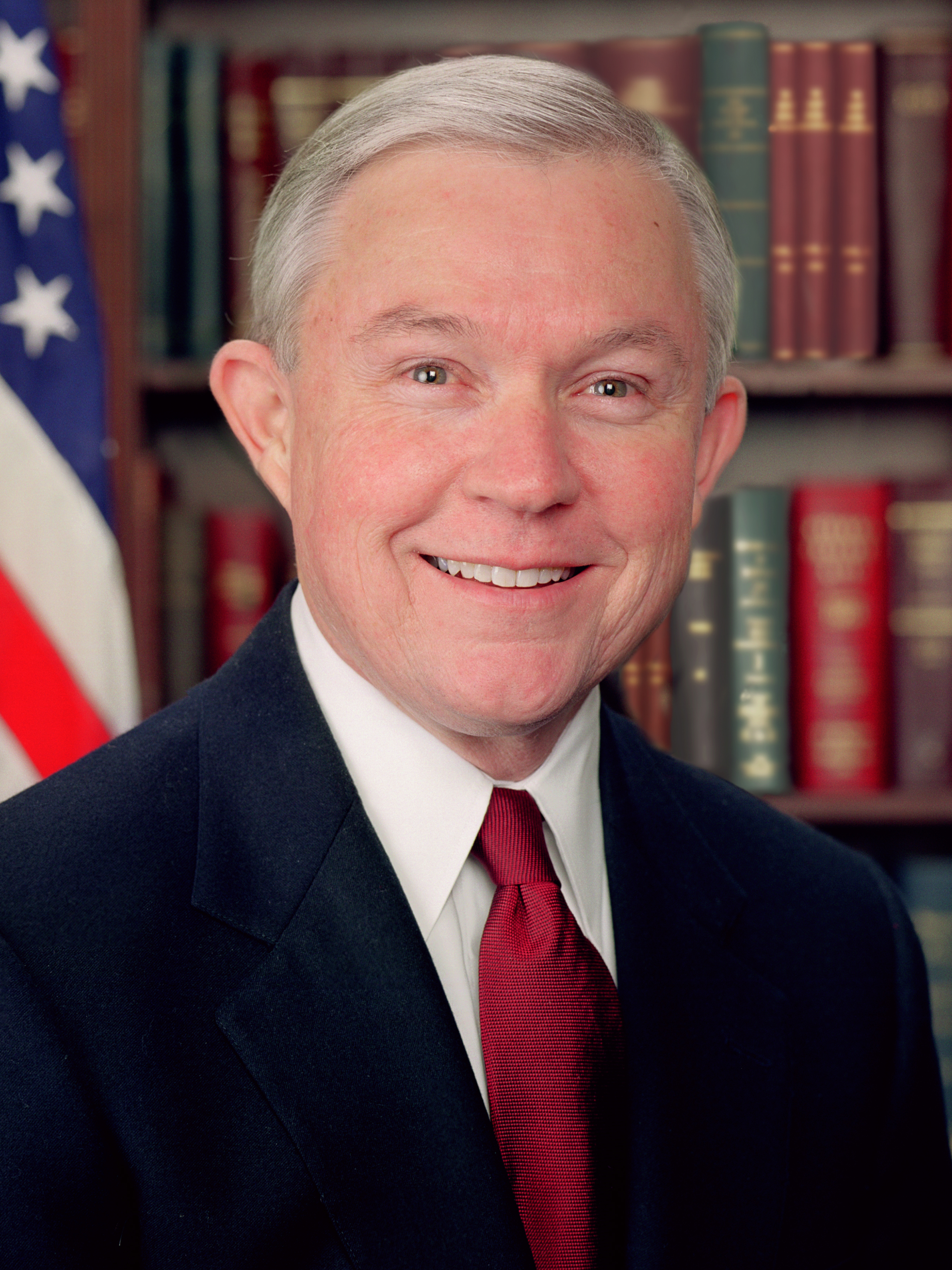
Official photo of Sessions as Senator, 2004

In 1996, Sessions won the Republican primary for U.S. Senate, after a runoff, and then defeated Democrat Roger Bedford 53%–46% in the November general election. He succeeded Democrat Howell Heflin, who had retired after 18 years in the Senate, making his victory a Republican pickup in the Senate.

In the February 1999 impeachment trial, Sessions voted to convict President Bill Clinton on both articles of impeachment, for perjury and obstruction of justice. However Clinton was acquitted on both charges by the Senate.

Following the Columbine High School massacre in April 1999, Sessions took part in the Senate's Subcommittee that investigated the massacre. Sessions blamed violent video games, movies and music, especially that of Marilyn Manson, and parts of culture for the actions of the two shooters.

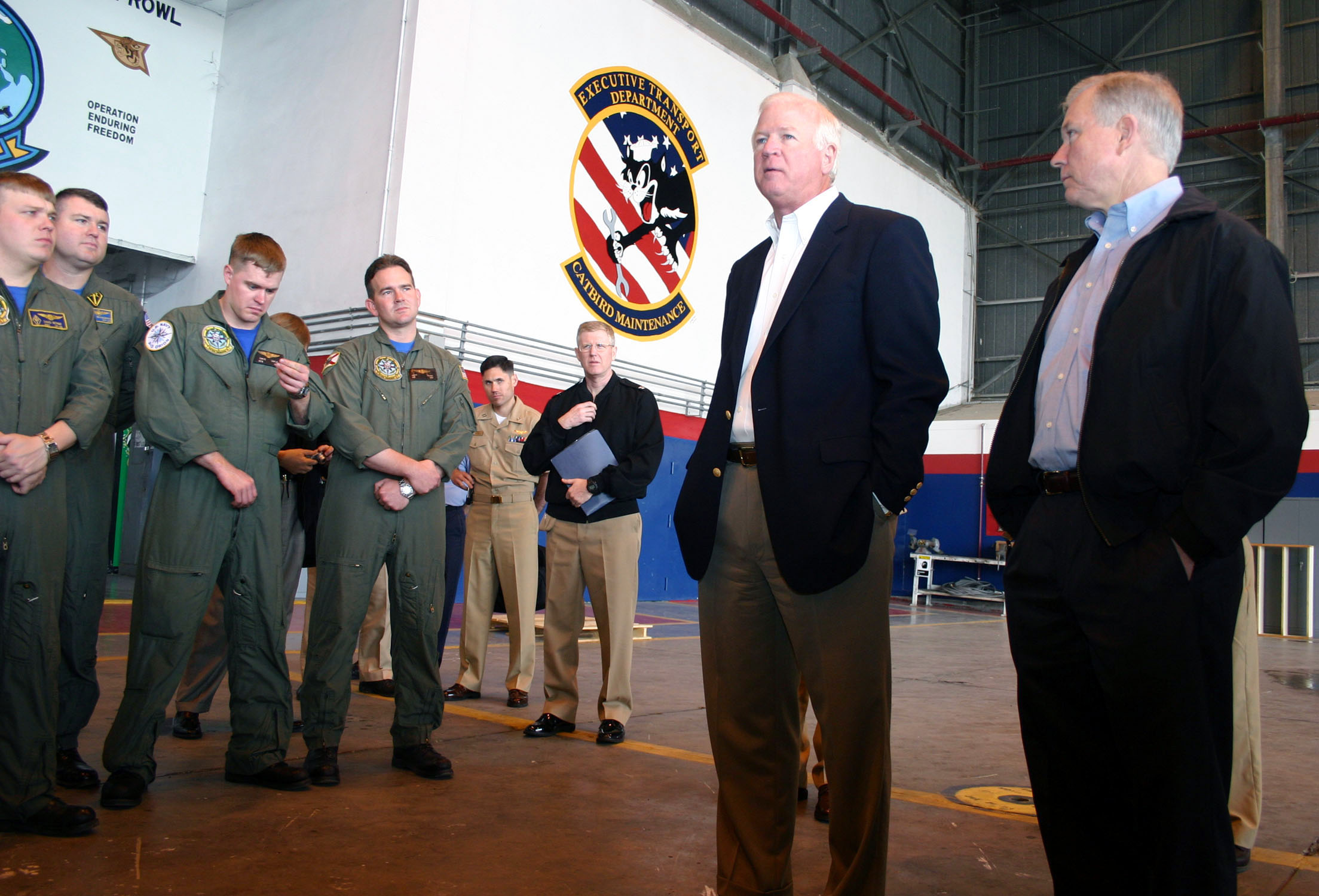
Senators Sessions and Saxby Chambliss talk to sailors, NAS Sigonella, Italy, 2004

In 2002, Sessions won reelection by defeating Democratic state auditor Susan Parker. In 2008, Sessions defeated Democratic state senator Vivian Davis Figures (sister-in-law of Thomas Figures, the assistant U.S. attorney who testified at Sessions's judicial confirmation hearing) to win a third term. Sessions received 63% of the vote to Figures's 37%. Sessions successfully sought a fourth term in 2014. In 2014, Sessions was uncontested in the Republican primary and was only opposed in the general election by write-in Democratic candidate Victor Sanchez Williams.

Sessions was only the second freshman Republican senator from Alabama since Reconstruction and gave Alabama two Republican senators, a first since Reconstruction. In 2002, he became the first Republican reelected to the Senate from Alabama since Reconstruction (given that his colleague Richard Shelby, who won reelection as a Republican in 1998, had previously run as a Democrat, switching parties in 1994).

Sessions was the ranking Republican member on the Senate Budget Committee, a former ranking member of the Senate Judiciary Committee, and a senior member of the Armed Services Committee. He also served on the Environment and Public Works Committee.

=== Campaign donors ===
According to OpenSecrets, between 1995 and 2016, Sessions's largest donors came from the legal, health, real estate, and insurance industries. From 1995 to 2016, the corporations employing donors who gave the most to his campaign were the Southern Company utility firm, the Balch & Bingham law firm, the Drummond Company coal mining firm, Collazo Enterprises, and Vulcan Materials.

=== Committee assignments ===
- Committee on Armed Services
  - Subcommittee on Airland
  - Subcommittee on Seapower
  - Subcommittee on Strategic Forces (Chairman)
- Committee on the Budget
- Committee on Environment and Public Works
  - Subcommittee on Clean Air and Nuclear Safety
  - Subcommittee on Green Jobs and the New Economy
  - Subcommittee on Transportation and Infrastructure
  - Subcommittee on Water and Wildlife
- Committee on the Judiciary
  - Subcommittee on Administrative Oversight and the Courts
  - Subcommittee on Crime and Drugs
  - Subcommittee on Immigration, Border Security, and Refugees (Chairman)
  - Subcommittee on Terrorism, Technology, and Homeland Security
- International Narcotics Control Caucus

=== 2016 presidential election ===
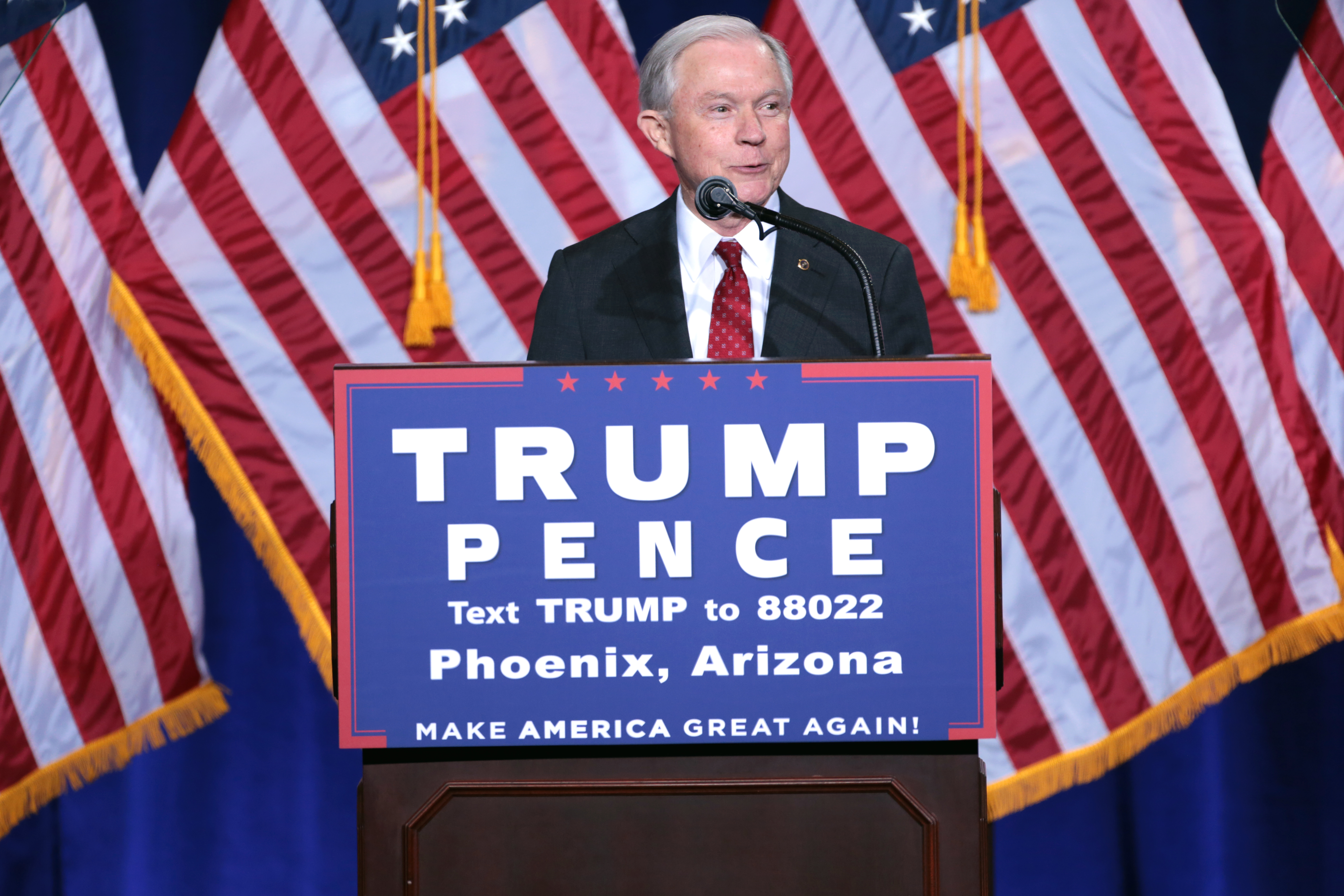
Sessions speaking at a campaign event for Republican presidential nominee Donald Trump on August 31, 2016

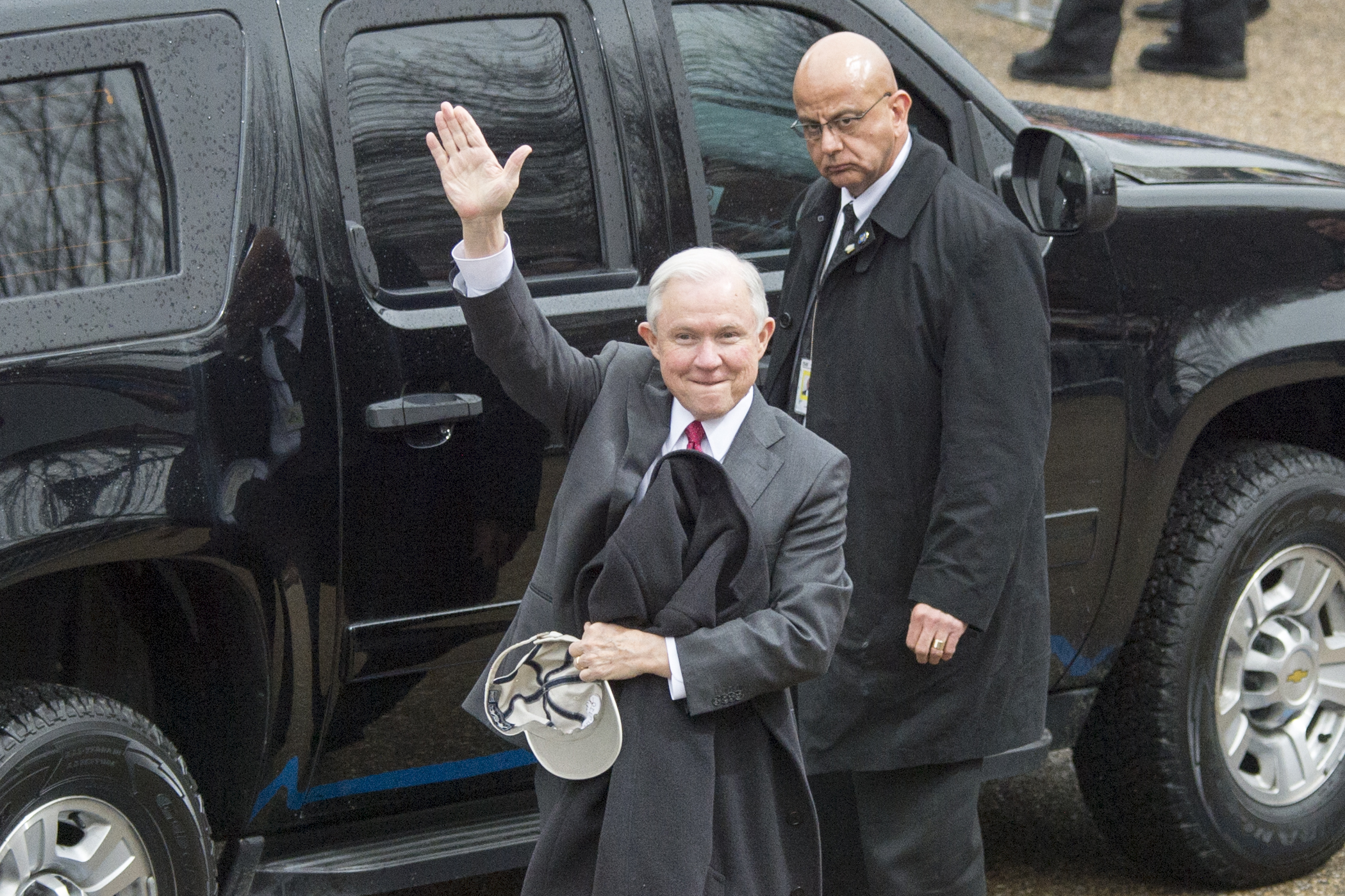
Sessions arriving at Trump's inauguration on January 20, 2017

Sessions was an early supporter of the presidential candidacy of Donald Trump, and was a major policy adviser to the Trump campaign, especially in regard to immigration and national security. He was on the short list to become Trump's running mate and was widely seen as a potential Cabinet secretary in a Trump administration.

Sessions donned a "Make America Great Again" cap at a Trump rally in August 2015, and Stephen Miller, Sessions's long-time communications director, joined the Trump campaign. On February 28, 2016, Sessions officially endorsed Trump for president. Sessions' endorsement further legitimized Trump's campaign, as he was the first and only sitting U.S. Senator to endorse him during the primary. Sessions' and Rudy Giuliani's appearance was a staple at Trump campaign rallies. Uncorroborated Russian communications intercepted by U.S. intelligence agencies discuss Ambassador Sergey Kislyak meeting privately with Sessions at the Mayflower Hotel during a Trump campaign event in April 2016.

==== Transition ====
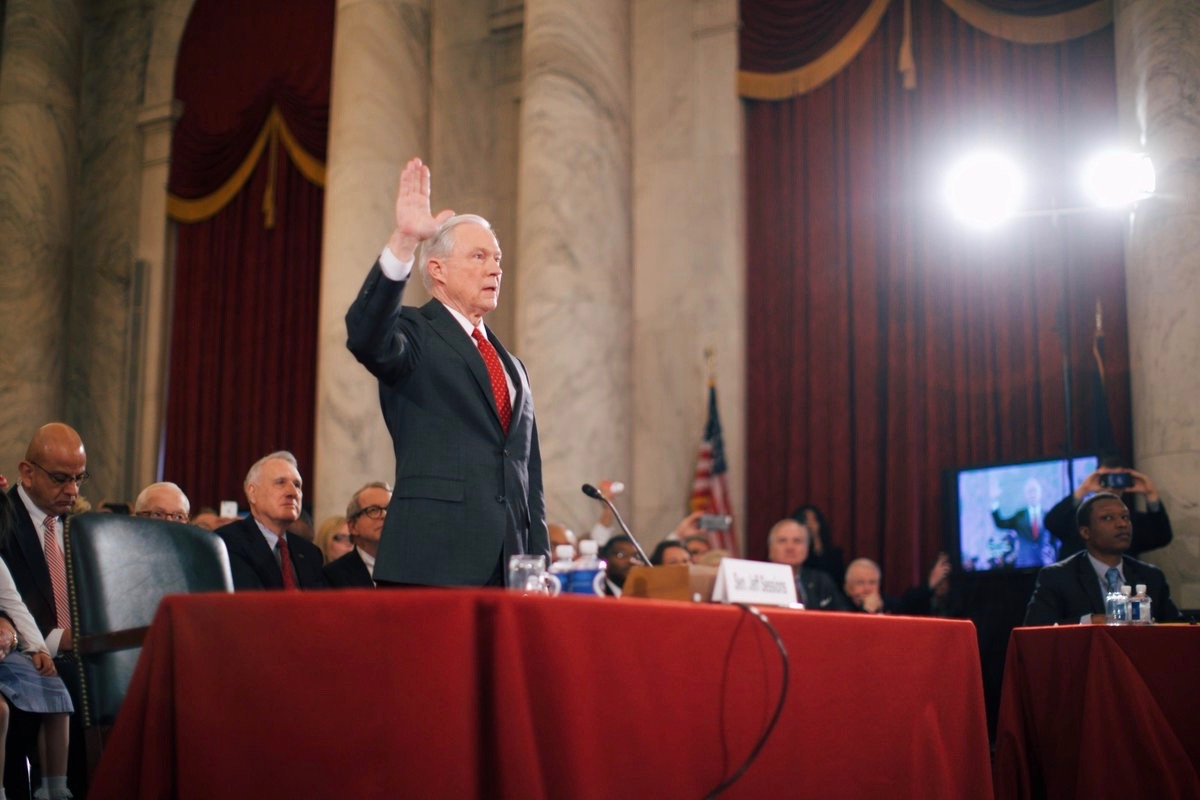
Sessions being sworn in at his confirmation hearing on January 10, 2017

During the transition, Sessions played a large role in appointments and policy preparation relative to space, NASA and related facilities in Alabama, while Peter Thiel advocated for private spaceflight.

== Attorney General of the United States (2017–2018) ==
=== Nomination and confirmation ===
President-elect Trump announced on November 18, 2016, that he would nominate Sessions to be Attorney General of the United States. Trump would later state in an August 22, 2018, interview with Fox News' Ainsley Earhardt that the only reason he nominated Sessions was because Sessions was an original supporter during his presidential campaign. The nomination engendered support and opposition from various groups and individuals. He was introduced by Senator Susan Collins from Maine who said, "He's a decent individual with a strong commitment to the rule of law. He's a leader of integrity. I think the attacks against him are not well founded and are unfair." More than 1,400 law school professors wrote a letter urging the Senate to reject the nomination. A group of black pastors rallied in support of Sessions in advance of his confirmation hearing; his nomination was supported by Gerald A. Reynolds, an African American former chairman of the United States Commission on Civil Rights. Six NAACP activists, including NAACP President Cornell William Brooks, were arrested at a January 2017 sit-in protesting the nomination.

On January 10, 2017, the Senate Judiciary Committee hearings on his nomination began and were interrupted by protesters. The committee approved his nomination February 1 on an 11–9 party-line vote. The nomination then went to the full Senate for a confirmation vote. The vote on Sessions was delayed until after the vote on Secretary of Education nominee Betsy DeVos, because his confirmation – and subsequent resignation from the Senate – would create a temporary vacancy, which otherwise would have jeopardized DeVos's narrow confirmation. On February 7, 2017, Senate majority leader Mitch McConnell stopped Senator Elizabeth Warren from reading statements opposing Sessions's nomination as federal judge that had been made by Ted Kennedy and Coretta Scott King. Warren was then officially rebuked per Senate Rule XIX on a party-line vote for "impugning a fellow senator's character". In silencing Warren, McConnell uttered the phrase "Nevertheless, she persisted"; the phrase was later adopted by the feminist movement in referring to women's persistence in breaking barriers. A few hours later Senator Jeff Merkley read without interruption the same letter by King that Warren had attempted to read.

On February 8, 2017, Sessions was confirmed as attorney general by a vote of 52 to 47. The next day, he was sworn in into his new post.

=== Tenure ===
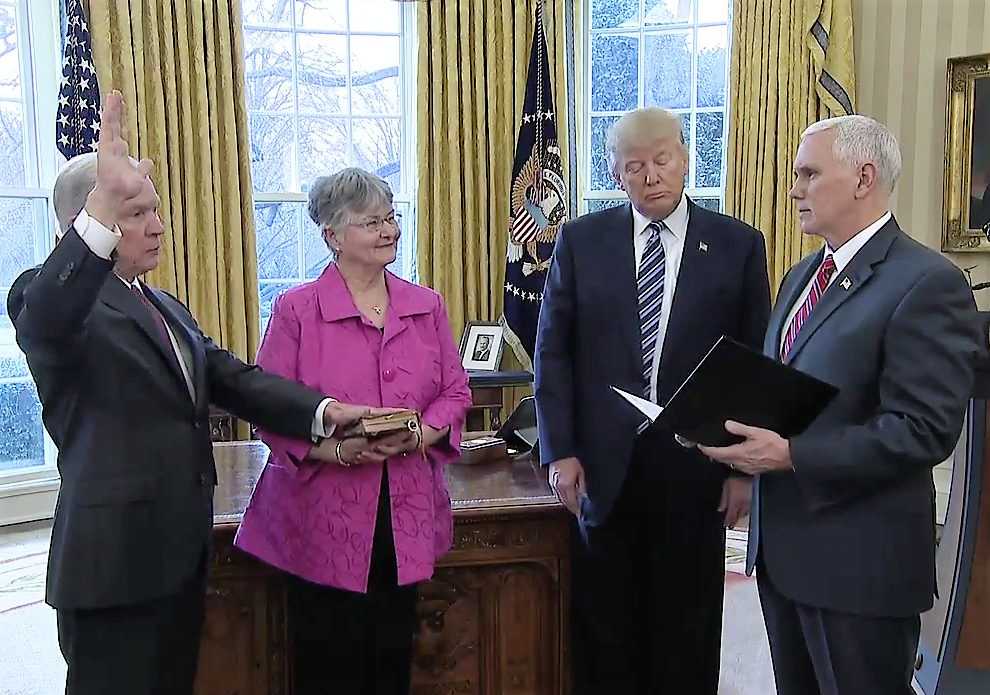
Sessions is sworn in as Attorney General by Vice President Mike Pence.

On March 10, 2017, Sessions oversaw the firing of 46 United States attorneys. His acting deputy, Dana Boente, and Deputy Attorney General nominee Rod Rosenstein remained in place after Trump declined their resignations.

On April 10, 2017, Sessions disbanded the National Commission on Forensic Science and ended the department's review of forensic accuracy in closed cases.

Sessions imposed a hiring freeze on most of the United States Department of Justice Criminal Division and U.S. attorneys' offices, and placed a total hiring freeze on the Department's Fraud Section. On April 24, 2017, Sessions traveled to an ethics lawyers' conference to assure them the department would continue prosecutions under the Foreign Corrupt Practices Act, regardless of Trump's comments that the law is a "horrible law" and that "the world is laughing at us".

On May 9, 2017, Sessions delivered a memo to the president recommending that Trump fire FBI director James Comey, attaching a memo by Deputy Attorney General Rod Rosenstein which called the Director's behavior indefensible. Trump fired Comey that day. In March 2017, Sessions had recused himself from investigations into Russia's interference in the 2016 presidential election. Comey was leading the investigations prior to his dismissal.

On June 5, 2017, Sessions issued a memo prohibiting the DOJ from directing or requiring settlement payments to non-governmental third parties that were "neither victims nor parties to the lawsuits," thus ending the Obama administration's practices. Sessions said that "[w]hen the federal government settles a case against a corporate wrongdoer, any settlement funds should go first to the victims and then to the American people – not to bankroll third-party special interest groups or the political friends of whoever is in power." Such settlement funding had been made available for the cleanup of the Deepwater Horizon oil spill. Over $2 billion of the Volkswagen emissions scandal settlement funds were diverted to California only, to build electric vehicle battery chargers despite the emissions impacting VW owners in all 50 states. The Regulatory Transparency Project investigated how such payments were unconstitutional.

In a November 2017 overview of his tenure in the Washington Post, Sessions was described as having made "dramatic and controversial changes [which] reflect his nationalist ideology and hard-line views".

In a speech on 5 December 2017, Sessions described a multi-billion dollar corruption scandal involving a Malaysian state fund (1Malaysia Development Berhad scandal) as the worst form of kleptocracy, and said the DoJ was working to provide justice to the victims. He said: "This is kleptocracy at its worst."

On December 21, 2017, Sessions rescinded 200 pages of guidance documents. Some of those 25 guidance documents had included warnings to avoid imposing excessive fees on the poor, to refrain from shipping some guns across state lines, and to encourage accommodation of the developmentally disabled. Sessions's recessions were criticized by the United States Commission on Civil Rights and prompted a lawsuit by the City Attorney of San Francisco. In 2018, Sessions shuttered the Justice Department's Office for Access to Justice, which had focused on making legal aid more accessible.

On November 7, 2018, Sessions resigned at President Trump's behest. It has been reported that his letter of resignation had also been submitted on a prior occasion.

==== Controversies about Russia ====
"Attorney General Sessions Statement on Recusal", U.S. Department of Justice (March 2, 2017)

During Sessions' Judiciary Committee confirmation hearing on January 10, Senator Al Franken asked him what he would do as attorney general "if there is any evidence that anyone affiliated with the Trump campaign communicated with the Russian government in the course of this campaign". Franken was referring to a news report alleging that Russia had compromising material on Trump, and that Trump surrogates were in contact with the Russian government. Sessions replied that he was "not aware of any of those activities" and said "I have been called a surrogate at a time or two in that campaign and I didn't have – did not have communications with the Russians, and I'm unable to comment on it." A week later, in his responses to written questions presented by Senator Patrick Leahy, Sessions stated that he had not been "in contact with anyone connected to any part of the Russian government about the 2016 election".

On March 1, 2017, reports surfaced that Sessions had contact with Russian government officials during the 2016 U.S. presidential election, even though during his confirmation hearings he denied he had any discussions with representatives of the Russian government. News reports revealed that Sessions had spoken twice with Russia's ambassador to the United States, Sergey Kislyak. The first communication took place after a Heritage Foundation event at the 2016 Republican National Convention attended by several ambassadors, including Kislyak who spoke with Sessions. The second interaction took place on September 8, 2016, when they met in Sessions's office; Sessions said they discussed Ukraine and terrorism. Sessions released a statement on March 1, 2017, saying "I never met with any Russian officials to discuss issues of the campaign. I have no idea what this allegation is about. It is false." U.S. Justice Department spokeswoman Sarah Isgur Flores said: "There was absolutely nothing misleading about his answer. He was asked during the hearing about communications between Russia and the Trump campaign – not about meetings he took as a senator and a member of the Armed Services Committee ... Last year, the Senator had over 25 conversations with foreign ambassadors as a senior member of the Armed Services Committee, including the British, Korean, Japanese, Polish, Indian, Chinese, Canadian, Australian, German and Russian ambassadors."

Upon the revelation that Sessions had met twice with the Russian ambassador, Republican senator Lindsey Graham called for Sessions to recuse himself from any investigations into the connections between Russia and the Trump campaign. Several Democratic members of Congress called on Sessions to resign his post as United States attorney general. Representatives Nancy Pelosi and Elijah Cummings and Senator Al Franken accused Sessions of having lied under oath at his confirmation hearing.

On March 20, 2017, FBI director James Comey testified in front of the House Intelligence Committee that since July 2016, the FBI had been conducting a counter-intelligence investigation to assess the extent of Russia's interference into the 2016 presidential election and whether Trump associates played a role in Russia's efforts. In May 2017 the Justice Department reported that Sessions had failed to disclose meetings with Russian officials during the presidential campaign in 2016, when he applied for his security clearance. Sessions's staff had been advised by the FBI that meetings with foreign dignitaries and their staff connected with his Senate activities did not need to be disclosed.

On June 13, 2017, Sessions testified before the Senate Intelligence Committee after canceling testimonies before the House and Senate Committees on Appropriations. Sessions rejected reports he had met with Russian Ambassador Kislyak during Trump's April 2016 speech at the Mayflower Hotel in Washington, D.C., testifying that he did not remember any "brief interaction" he may have had with the ambassador. Accused of "stonewalling" by Senator Ron Wyden, Sessions discussed the executive privilege power, and said that he was refusing to answer questions about his conversations with Trump because "I am protecting the President's right to assert it if he chooses." He was being advised by his personal lawyer Charles J. Cooper.

In July 2017, The Washington Post reported that Kislyak, in communications intercepted by U.S. intelligence, had told his superiors in Moscow that his conversations with Sessions had concerned Trump's campaign as well as "Trump's positions on Russia-related issues". Previously, after initially denying having met with Kisylak at all, Sessions had repeatedly asserted that in his meetings with the Russian ambassador he never discussed the campaign and only met with him in his capacity as a U.S. senator. The Department of Justice responded by saying that Sessions stood by his testimony that he "never met with or had any conversations with any Russians or any foreign officials concerning any type of interference with any campaign or election".

In March 2016, one of Trump's foreign policy advisors named George Papadopoulos suggested that he could use personal connections to arrange a meeting with Russian president Vladimir Putin, and Sessions rejected the proposed meeting, according to information provided to CNN by a person in attendance. This raised questions on the truthfulness of Sessions's testimony and whether Sessions committed perjury during his testimony. Furthermore, on the same day, testimony given by Carter Page to the House intelligence committee contradicted Sessions's previous statements by stating that he had told Sessions about plans to visit Russia during the campaign.

Beginning in March 2017, senators asked the FBI to conduct a criminal perjury investigation into Sessions. Deputy Director Andrew McCabe then assigned FBI agents to investigate. According to Sessions's personal lawyer, the investigation concluded without charges being brought.

On March 16, 2018, Sessions fired McCabe hours before the deputy director would have qualified for a government pension, citing McCabe's lack of candor to the department's inspector general.

==== Recusal from election investigation, and relationship with President Trump ====
The idea that Sessions might have to recuse himself from the Russia investigation was raised almost as soon as he took office. Trump was concerned about the implications of such a recusal, reportedly telling aides that he needed a loyalist overseeing the investigation. In early March he told White House counsel Don McGahn to urge Sessions to retain oversight of the investigation, but Sessions told McGahn he intended to follow the advice of Justice Department lawyers.

On March 2, 2017, Sessions announced that he would recuse himself from any investigations into Russia's interference in the 2016 presidential election, or any other matters related to the 2016 presidential election. He had been advised to do so by career Justice Department personnel, citing concerns about impartiality given his prominent role in the Trump election campaign. When told that a special counsel had been appointed, the president slumped back in his chair and said, "Oh my God. This is terrible. This is the end of my presidency. I'm fucked," then elaborating, “Everyone tells me if you get one of these independent counsels it ruins your presidency. It takes years and years and I won’t be able to do anything. This is the worst thing that ever happened to me.” That same day, The Wall Street Journal reported that Sessions' contacts with Russians had been investigated, but it was not clear whether the investigation was ongoing. Sessions said during a televised interview that the recusal was not an admission of any wrongdoing. On June 8, 2017, James Comey, who had been dismissed as FBI director a month earlier, testified before the Senate Intelligence Committee that he had expected Sessions to recuse himself from the Russia investigation two weeks before he did so, for classified reasons that made Sessions's continued engagement in the investigation "problematic".

Attorney General Sessions Statement on Recusal

A few days after he announced his recusal, Sessions traveled to Mar-a-Lago to meet with Trump. Sessions wanted to talk about implementing Trump's proposed travel ban, but instead Trump berated him for recusing himself and asked him to reverse his recusal. Sessions refused. In May 2017, Sessions offered to resign after receiving criticism from Trump, but Trump did not accept the resignation.

For the rest of Sessions's tenure, Trump continued to be furious with him for his recusal, blaming it for the appointment of Robert Mueller as special counsel by Deputy Attorney General Rod Rosenstein. Trump publicly attacked Sessions multiple times via Twitter and in public comments, saying he regretted choosing him as attorney general and that he never would have done so if he had known Sessions was going to recuse himself from the investigation. According to Bob Woodward's book Fear: Trump in the White House, Trump called Sessions "mentally retarded" and described him as a "dumb southerner". Trump denied ever using "these terms on anyone", although he had been recorded using the word "retarded" as an insult on two episodes of The Howard Stern Show.

In addition to criticizing him, Trump often used Twitter to suggest things he thought Sessions should do or to criticize Justice Department actions. According to Senator Jeff Flake, "the president has been pushing [Sessions] very openly to go after the president's enemies and lay off his friends," adding "And so far, Jeff Sessions, bless his heart, has resisted and maintained that the judiciary needs to be independent." Trump demanded that Sessions investigate Hillary Clinton, Barack Obama, and various employees of the FBI and Justice Department. In August 2018 he said that Sessions should "stop" the Mueller investigation. He later tweeted that "Our A.G. is scared stiff and Missing in Action." In an August interview Trump complained that Sessions "never took control of the Justice Department", to which Sessions in a rare response said "While I am Attorney General, the actions of the Department of Justice will not be improperly influenced by political considerations. ... I took control of the Department of Justice the day I was sworn in."

On September 3, 2018, Trump complained on Twitter that "investigations of two very popular Republican Congressmen were brought to a well publicized charge, just ahead of the Mid-Terms, by the Jeff Sessions Justice Department. Two easy wins now in doubt because there is not enough time." Many lawmakers, including Republican senators, said Trump's remark was inappropriate, and a spokesperson for House speaker Paul Ryan said the Justice Department "should always remain apolitical".

Trump often hinted he wanted to fire Sessions, perhaps after the November 2018 elections. Sessions told associates he did not intend to resign, but on November 7, 2018, he submitted a letter of resignation to Chief of Staff John Kelly at President Trump's request.

==== Criminal justice ====
On April 3, 2017, Sessions announced that he intended to review consent decrees in which local law enforcement agencies had agreed to Department oversight. U.S. district judge James K. Bredar then denied Sessions's request to delay a new consent decree with the Baltimore Police Department.

On May 12, 2017, Sessions ordered federal prosecutors to begin seeking the greatest criminal charges possible in drug cases. The new guidelines rescinded a memo by Attorney General Eric Holder that had sought to reduce mass incarceration by avoiding mandatory sentencing.

On July 19, 2017, Sessions signed an order reviving federally adopted civil asset forfeiture, which allows local law enforcement to bypass state limitations on seizing the property of those suspected but not charged of crimes.

In September 2017, the Justice Department under Sessions stated that it would no longer investigate police departments and publicize their shortcomings in reports, a policy previously enacted under the Obama administration. These reports were the basis of negotiating consent decrees.

On December 22, 2017, Sessions rescinded guidelines intended to warn local courts against imposing excessive fines and fees on poor defendants.

Sessions has brought prominence to prosecutions of the MS-13 gang.

In February 2018, Sessions sent a public letter to Senator Chuck Grassley (R-IA) opposing the Senate Judiciary Committee chairman's bipartisan Sentencing Reform and Corrections Act bill. Sessions opposed White House senior advisor Jared Kushner's support for the reforms until Kushner reportedly agreed to focus instead on improving prison conditions.

On March 20, 2018, Sessions signed a memo instructing federal prosecutors to seek capital punishment on major drug dealers.

In November 2018, just before Sessions was fired by Trump, Sessions ordered for consent decrees to be severely restricted.

In June 2020, Sessions asserted that former president Barack Obama had coddled criminals while disrespecting law enforcement. He characterized an episode in which "there's a riot, and he has a beer at the White House with some criminal, to listen to him. Wasn't having a beer with the police officers." In July 2009, a brief uproar arose after a black Harvard professor, Henry Louis Gates, was arrested by a white police officer as Gates attempted to enter his own home. Obama hosted both men at the White House to discuss the incident over beers.

==== Immigration ====
On March 27, 2017, Sessions told reporters that sanctuary cities failing to comply with policies of the Trump administration would lose federal funding, and cited the shooting of Kathryn Steinle as an example of an illegal immigrant committing a heinous crime.

On April 11, 2017, Sessions issued a memo for federal attorneys to consider prosecuting anyone harboring an illegal immigrant. On the same day, while at an entry border port in Nogales, Arizona, Sessions insisted the new administration would implement policies against those continuing "to seek improper and illegal entry into this country". On April 21, nine sanctuary cities were sent letters by the Justice Department giving them a deadline of June 30 to provide an explanation of how their policies were not in violation of the law, and Sessions hours later warned "enough is enough" in San Diego amid his tour of the U.S.–Mexico border. Two days later, Sessions said that reducing false tax credits given to "mostly Mexicans" could pay for the U.S.–Mexico border and it would be paid for "one way or the other".

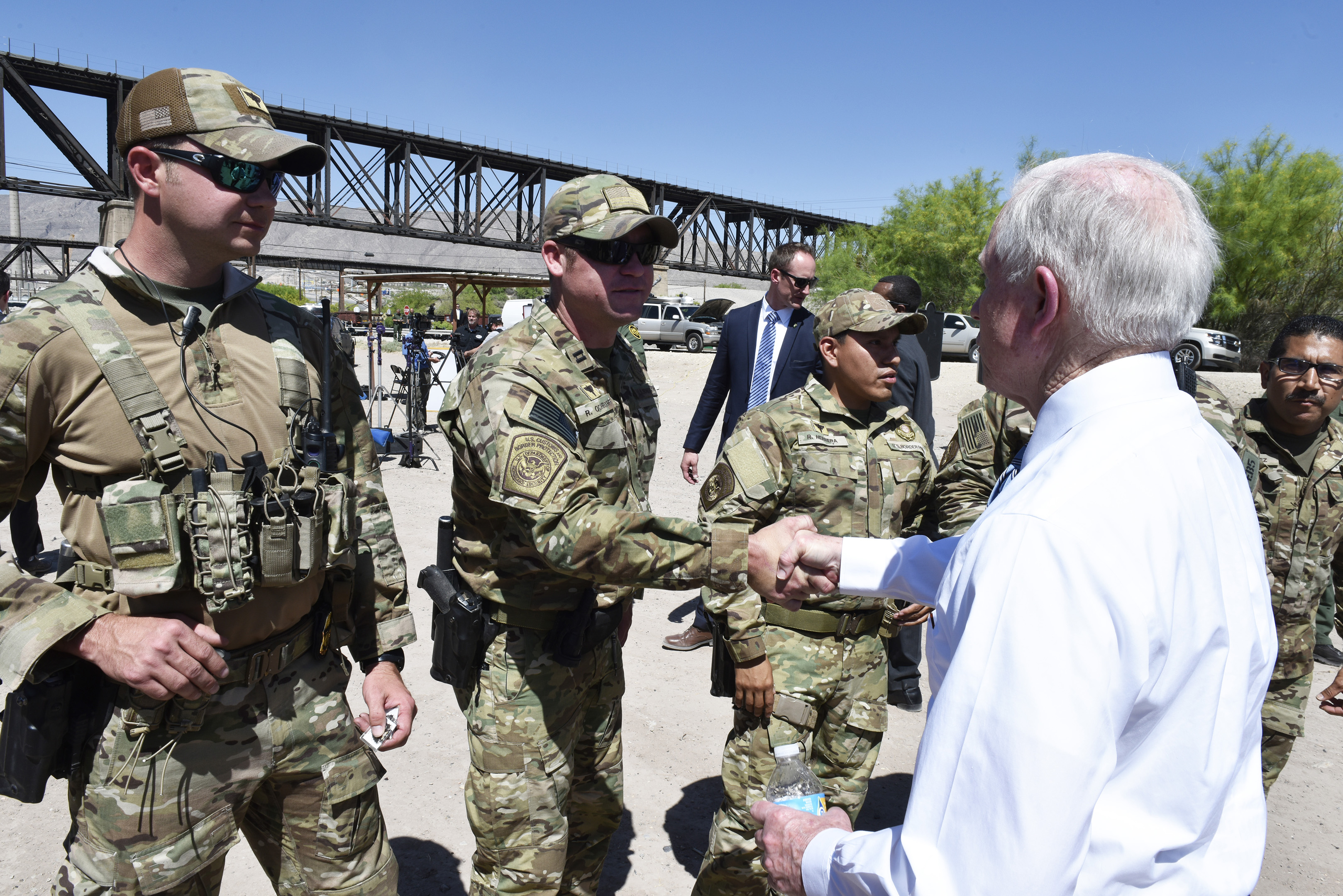
Sessions meets with Department of Justice and DHS personnel in El Paso, Texas, April 2017

Sessions attempted to block funding to sanctuary cities. Sessions also threatened to criminally prosecute uncooperative local officials. Federal judges in Chicago, San Francisco, and Philadelphia have rejected Sessions's efforts.

On March 6, 2018, Sessions sued the state of California in federal district court, alleging that the state's laws regarding prisoner release, workplace inspection, and detention site inspection are preempted by the federal government's immigration policy.

Sessions played an important role in implementing the Trump administration family separation policy wherein illegal immigrants were separated from their children. In June 2018, Sessions gave a speech in which he cited the Bible to justify the family separation policy, declaring that people should "obey the laws of the government because God has ordained them for the purpose of order." Christian leaders strongly disagreed with the policy, with Cardinal Daniel DiNardo calling it "immoral", Reverend Franklin Graham calling it "disgraceful", and Bishop Kenneth Carter of Sessions' own church (the United Methodist Church) calling it "unnecessarily cruel". Bible scholar and professor Matthew Schlimm said that history was being repeated as Sessions had taken the quote "completely out of context" just as slave traders and Nazis had misused the Bible in the past. Sessions sought to distance himself from the family separation policy, letting others in the administration take the blame.

On June 11, 2018, Sessions reversed a decision by the Board of Immigration Appeals granting a battered woman asylum and announced that victims of domestic abuse or gang violence will no longer qualify for asylum in the United States. He stated that "[t]he mere fact that a country may have problems effectively policing certain crimes – such as domestic violence or gang violence – or that certain populations are more likely to be victims of crime, cannot itself establish an asylum claim." Domestic violence victims had been eligible for asylum since 2014. According to The New Yorker, legal experts estimated that "Sessions had single-handedly dismantled between sixty and seventy per cent of asylum jurisprudence from the previous three decades."

In April 2017, while on a radio talk show, Sessions said that he was "amazed that a judge sitting on an island in the Pacific can issue an order that stops the President of the United States from what appears to be clearly his statutory and Constitutional power". This was in reference to Derrick Watson, a judge for the United States District Court for the District of Hawaii, blocking an executive order by President Trump. After receiving criticism for the remark, Sessions said there is nothing he "would want to phrase differently" and that he "wasn't criticizing the judge or the island".

==== Marijuana ====
In a May 2017 letter, Sessions personally asked congressional leaders to repeal the Rohrabacher–Farr amendment so that the Justice Department could prosecute providers of medical marijuana. The Rohrabacher–Farr amendment is a 2014 measure that bars the Justice Department from using federal funds to prevent states "from implementing their own State laws that authorize the use, distribution, possession or cultivation of medical marijuana". Sessions wrote in the letter that "I believe it would be unwise for Congress to restrict the discretion of the Department to fund particular prosecutions, particularly in the midst of an historic drug epidemic and potentially long-term uptick in violent crime." John Hudak of the Brookings Institution criticized the letter, stating that it was a "scare tactic" that "should make everyone openly question whether candidate Trump's rhetoric and the White House's words on his support for medical marijuana was actually a lie to the American public on an issue that garners broad, bipartisan support."

On January 4, 2018, Sessions rescinded the Cole Memorandum, which had prevented federal prosecutors from bringing charges against state legalized marijuana use.

==== Unite the Right rally violence and civil rights investigation ====
Sessions called the fatal vehicle-ramming attack at the August 2017 Unite the Right rally in Charlottesville, Virginia an act of domestic terrorism, and began a civil rights investigation into the attack to determine if it will be tried in court as a hate crime. Sessions said "You can be sure we will charge and advance the investigation toward the most serious charges that can be brought, because this is an unequivocally unacceptable and evil attack that cannot be accepted in America."

==== Gender identity ====
In a "Dear Colleague" letter issued February 22, 2017, the Department of Justice (DOJ) and the Department of Education withdrew and rescinded the 2016 "Dear Colleague" letter issued jointly by the same organizations. The earlier "Dear Colleague" letter, issued on May 13, 2016, had established that Title IX of the Education Amendments of 1972 allows access to sex-segregated facilities (such as restrooms) corresponding to a student's gender identity. The 2017 letter argued that the 2016 letter lacked "extensive legal analysis", did not "explain how the position is consistent with the express language of Title IX", and it had not undergone "any formal public process". Sessions issued a statement which said "Congress, state legislatures, and local governments are in a position to adopt appropriate policies or laws addressing this issue."

On October 4, 2017, Sessions released a Department of Justice (DoJ) memo interpreting Title VII of the 1964 Civil Rights Act, which prohibits discrimination based on sex, stating that Title VII "is ordinarily defined to mean biologically male or female," but it "does not prohibit discrimination based on gender identity per se." The memo was written to withdraw an earlier DoJ memorandum issued by Eric Holder on December 15, 2014, which aligned the DoJ with the Equal Employment Opportunity Commission on interpreting Title VII to include gender identity or transgender status as a protected class. At that time, DoJ had already stopped opposing claims of discrimination brought by transgender federal employees. Devin O'Malley, representing the DoJ, stated "the last administration abandoned that fundamental principle [that the Department of Justice cannot expand the law beyond what Congress has provided], which necessitated today's action." Sharon McGowan, a lawyer with Lambda Legal who previously served in the Civil Rights division of DoJ, rejected that argument, saying "this memo [issued by Sessions] is not actually a reflection of the law as it is – it's a reflection of what the DOJ wishes the law were" and "[t]he Justice Department is actually getting back in the business of making anti-transgender law in court."

==== Turkey's sanctions against Sessions ====
Sessions's resignation letter

On August 1, 2018, the U.S. Department of Treasury imposed sanctions on top Turkish government officials who were involved in the detention of American pastor Andrew Brunson, who was arrested in October 2016, several months after a failed coup attempt in Turkey. Turkey's president Recep Tayyip Erdoğan ordered Sessions's assets in Turkey frozen in retaliation for U.S. sanctions.

=== Resignation ===
On November 7, 2018 (the day after the 2018 midterm elections), Sessions resigned as attorney general at the president's request.

== U.S. Senate campaign (2020) ==
Sessions at a press event in Birmingham, Alabama on June 24, 2020

In October 2019, Sessions began exploring a potential candidacy for his old Senate seat in the 2020 election. On November 7, 2019, Sessions, the night before the deadline to file in the hyper-competitive Republican race, announced his candidacy. The winner of the Republican primary would challenge incumbent Democrat Doug Jones.

With no candidate acquiring more than 50% of the vote in the Republican primary, Sessions advanced to the run-off originally to be held on March 31, but delayed until July 14 due to the COVID-19 pandemic. Sessions faced the former head football coach at Auburn University, Tommy Tuberville. During the primary, Alabama's senior senator Richard Shelby asked Trump to stay out of the race. However, after the first-round primary Trump endorsed Tuberville. Throughout the campaign, Sessions had called himself an ally and supporter of Trump. However, on April 3 the Trump campaign sent a letter to Sessions, objecting and condemning the connections that Sessions has made between him and Trump during the Senate race.

Throughout the campaign Sessions repeatedly defended attacks from the President on Twitter. On May 22, 2020, President Trump tweeted "3 years ago, after Jeff Sessions recused himself, the Fraudulent Mueller Scam began. Alabama, do not trust Jeff Sessions. He let our Country down ..." Sessions responded the next day by tweeting: "Mr. President, Alabama can and does trust me, as do conservatives across the country. Perhaps you've forgotten. They trusted me when I stepped out and put that trust on the line for you." The President responded directly by continuing to deride Sessions, while further encouraging him to drop out of the race entirely.

Sessions lost the Alabama Senate primary to Tommy Tuberville on July 14, 2020. A Washington Post headline read, "Sessions loses runoff in Alabama as Trump helps end career of key supporter he came to despise".

== Political positions ==
During his tenure, Sessions was considered one of the most conservative members of the U.S. Senate.

=== Immigration ===
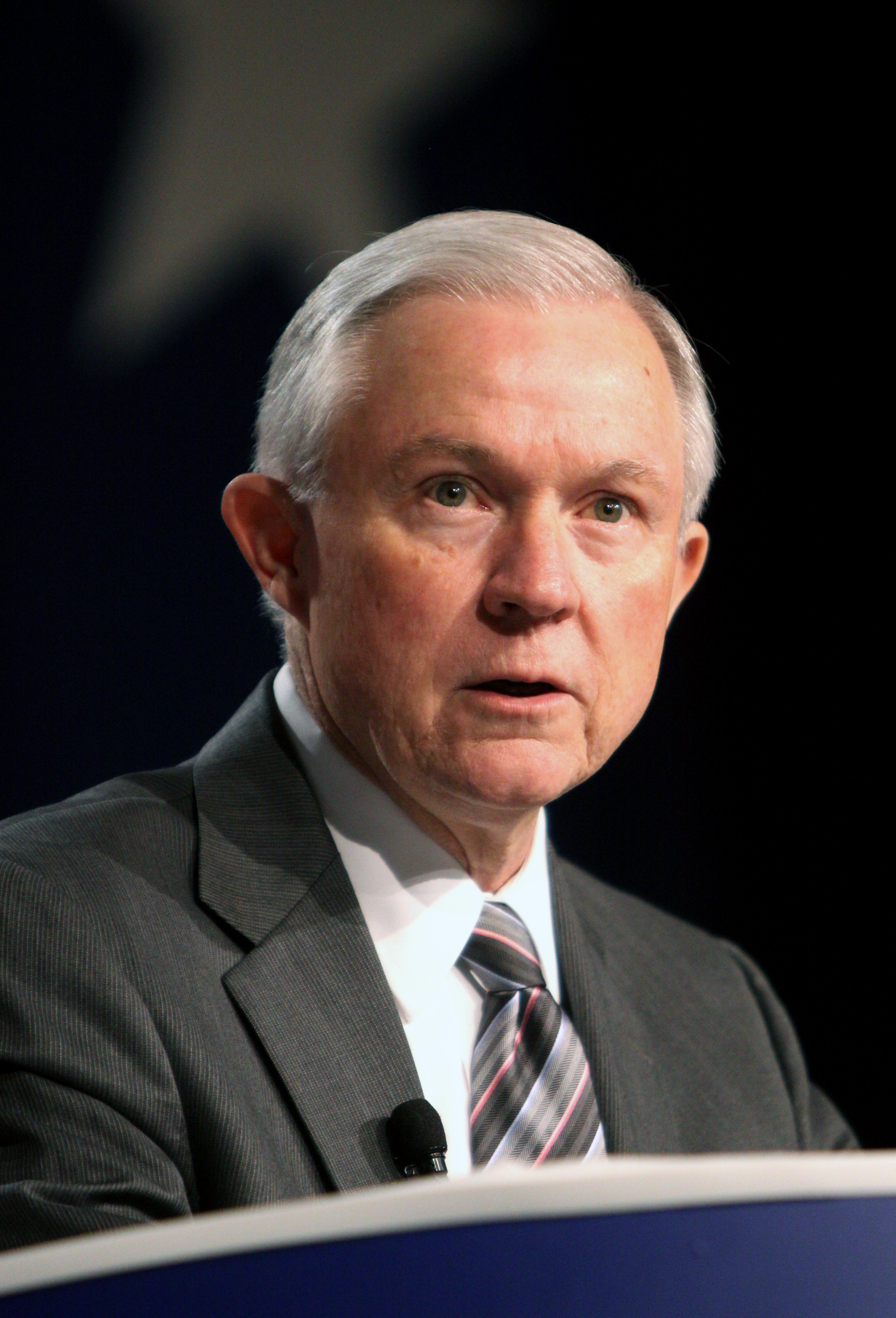
U.S. Senator Jeff Sessions addressing voters in 2011

Sessions was an opponent of legal and illegal immigration during his time in Congress. He opposed the Comprehensive Immigration Reform Act of 2006, the Comprehensive Immigration Reform Act of 2007 and the bi-partisan Gang of Eight's Border Security, Economic Opportunity, and Immigration Modernization Act of 2013. He said that a pathway to citizenship for illegal immigrants undermines the rule of law, that the inflow of guest workers and immigrants depresses wages and raises unemployment for United States citizens, and that current immigration policy expands an underclass dependent on the welfare state. In a May 2006 floor speech, he said, "Fundamentally, almost no one coming from the Dominican Republic to the United States is coming because they have a skill that would benefit us and that would indicate their likely success in our society." He is a supporter of E-Verify, the federal database that allows businesses to electronically verify the immigration status of potential new hires, and has advocated for expanded construction of a Southern border fence. In 2013, Sessions said an opt-out provision in immigration legislation before Congress would allow Secretary of Homeland Security Janet Napolitano to avoid building a border fence. PolitiFact called Sessions' statement false, stating that the provision would allow Napolitano to determine where the fence was built, not to opt out of building it entirely.

Sessions's Senate website expressed his view that there is a "clear nexus between immigration and terrorism" and that "Plainly, there is no way to vet these refugees" who would immigrate to the U.S. from Syria in 2016 or who came to the U.S. after September 11, 2001, and were alleged to be involved in terrorism. The news release said that "the absence of derogatory information in our systems about an individual does not mean that admitting that individual carries no risk." Sessions has expressed the view that the children of immigrants from Muslim-majority countries are "susceptible to the toxic radicalization of terrorist organizations" on the basis of the Orlando and San Bernardino attacks. Sessions supported establishing safe zones as an alternative to immigration from war-torn countries.

Breitbart News executive chairman Steve Bannon talked about Sessions as the leader of the movement for slowing down both legal and illegal immigration before Donald Trump came to the scene, considering his work to kill immigration reform as akin "to the civil rights movement of 1960". Sessions and his communications director Stephen Miller developed what Miller describes as "nation-state populism" as a response to globalization and immigration.

Immigration is the issue that brought Sessions and Trump together. Trump has credited Sessions as an influential advisor on immigration. After Trump was elected and announced Sessions as his attorney general nominee, Cato Institute immigration analyst Alex Nowrasteh observed "It's almost as if Sessions wrote Trump's immigration platform."

On June 18, 2018, a group of more than 600 United Methodist Church clergy and laity announced that they were bringing church law charges against Sessions. The members of the group accused him of "child abuse, immorality, racial discrimination and dissemination of doctrines contrary to the standards of the doctrine of the United Methodist Church".

According to the American Civil Liberties Union (ACLU), a woman and her child fled domestic abuse in El Salvador to seek asylum in the U.S. However the mother was removed from her detention facility and likely put on a plane on August 9, 2018, despite Justice Department promises that she and others would not be deported before the judge could rule on their cases. Judge Emmet G. Sullivan demanded, "Turn that plane around." He threatened to hold those responsible for the removal in contempt of court, starting with Sessions, if the situation was not rectified. A Department of Homeland Security official stated, "We are complying with the court's requests ... the plaintiffs will not disembark and will be promptly returned to the United States." An ACLU suit challenged a decision by Sessions to make it nearly impossible for victims of domestic violence and gangs to qualify for asylum in the U.S.

=== Foreign and military policy ===
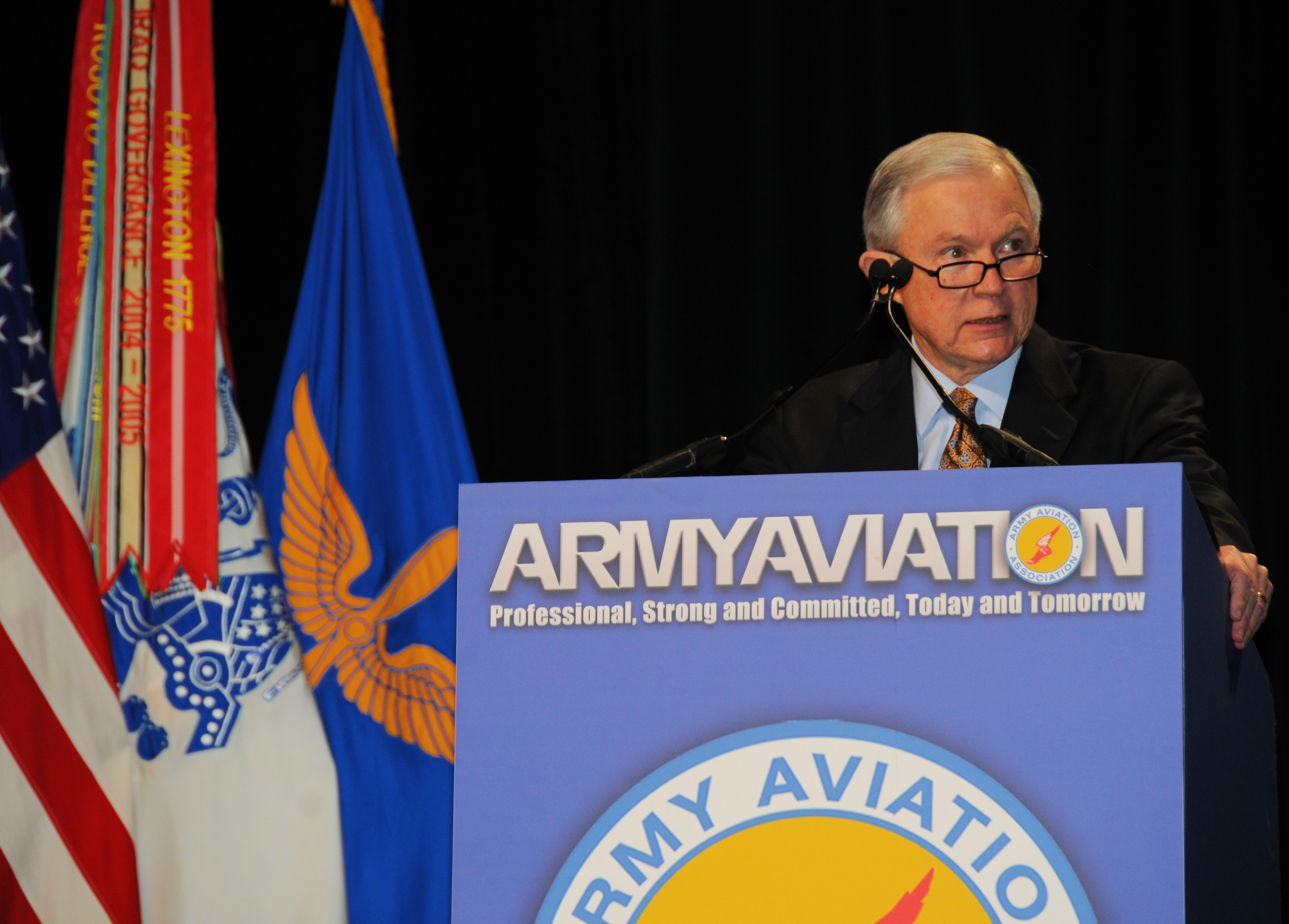
Senator Sessions speaks during Army Aviation Association of America (AAAA) 2012 in Nashville, Tennessee.

In 2005, Sessions spoke at a rally in Washington, D.C. in favor of the War in Iraq organized in opposition to an anti-war protest held the day before. Sessions said of the anti-war protesters: "The group who spoke here the other day did not represent the American ideals of freedom, liberty and spreading that around the world. I frankly don't know what they represent, other than to blame America first." The same year, he opposed legislation by Senator John McCain prohibiting the U.S. military from engaging in torture; the amendment passed 90–9.

Sessions opposed the NATO bombing of Yugoslavia, the 2011 military intervention in Libya, and arming the Syrian rebels. As Attorney General, he reportedly advised President Trump against increasing the U.S. military presence in Afghanistan.

In the 109th Congress, Sessions introduced legislation to increase the death gratuity benefit for families of service members from $12,420 to $100,000. The bill also increased the level of coverage under the Servicemen's Group Life Insurance from $250,000 to $400,000. Sessions's legislation was accepted in the Supplemental Appropriations Act of 2005.

In June 2014, Sessions was one of three senators to vote against additional funding for the VA medical system. He opposed the bill due to cost concerns and indicated that Congress should instead focus on "reforms and solutions that improve the quality of service and the effectiveness that is delivered".

In September 2016, in advance of a UN Security Council resolution 2334 condemning Israeli settlements in the occupied Palestinian territories, Sessions signed an AIPAC-sponsored letter urging President Barack Obama to veto "one-sided" resolutions against Israel.

=== Crime and security ===
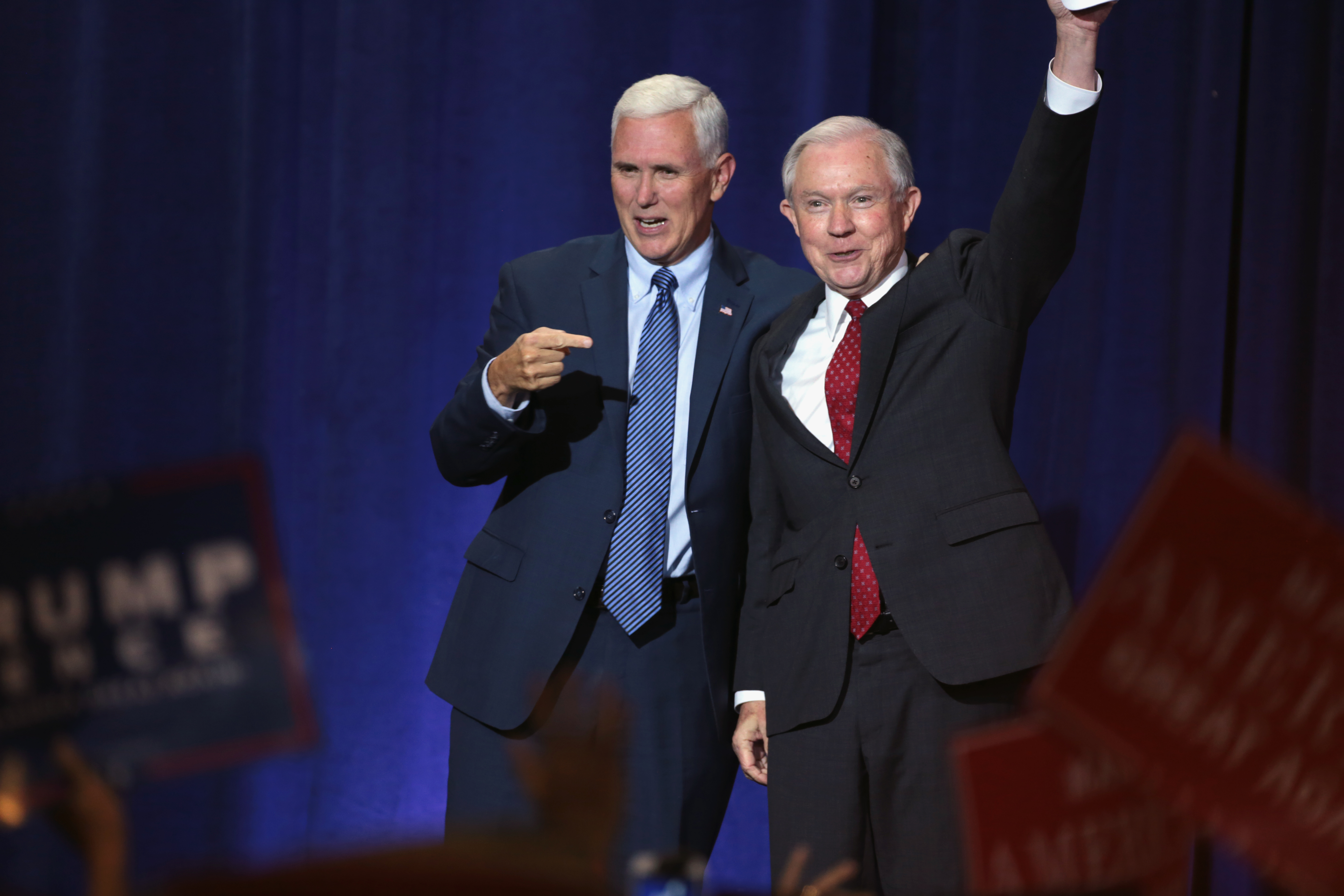
Senator Sessions and Indiana Governor, and Republican vice presidential nominee, Mike Pence at an immigration policy speech in Phoenix, Arizona in August 2016

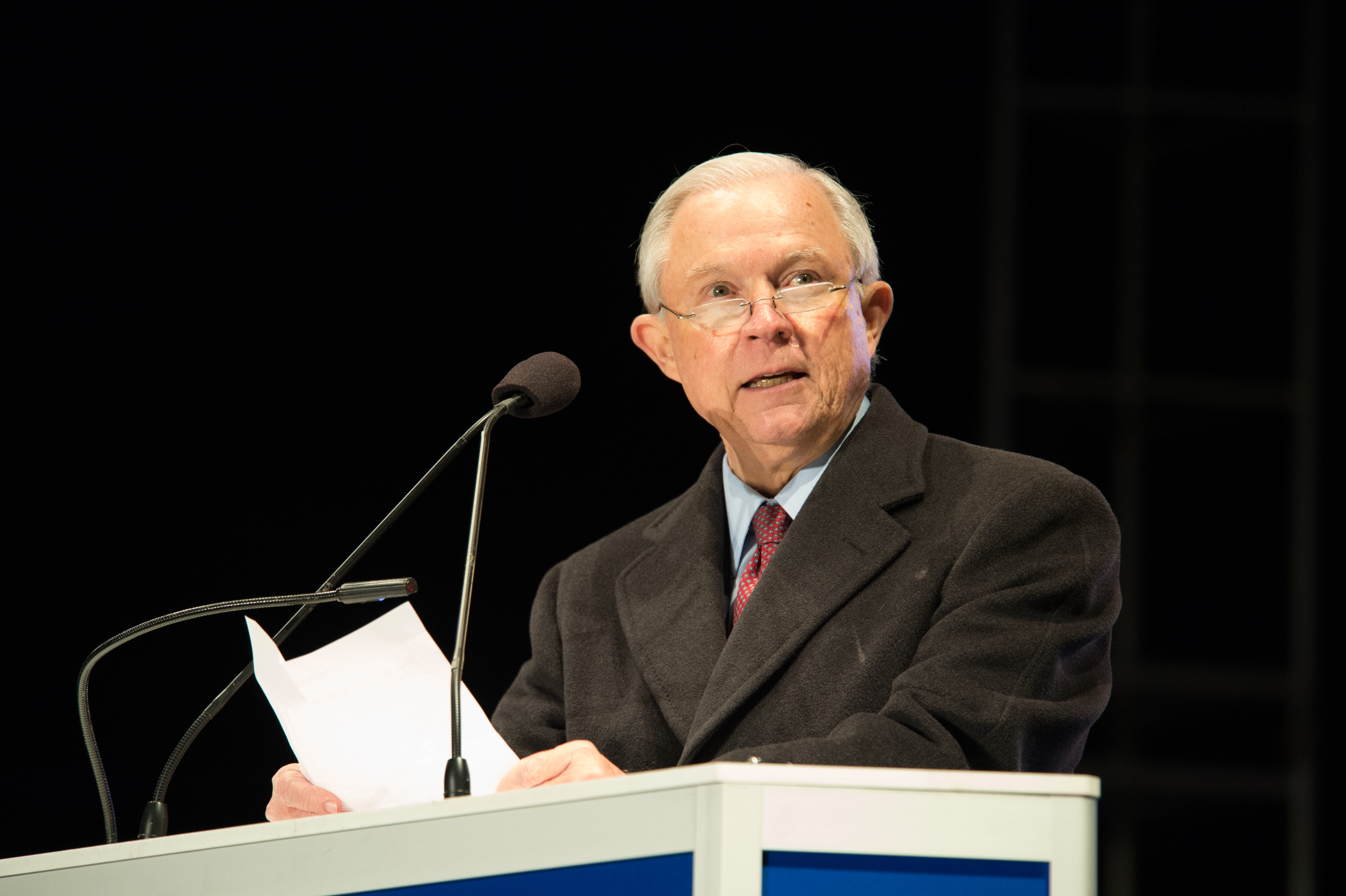
Sessions speaking at the 2017 Police Week Candlelight Vigil

In 1996, Sessions promoted state legislation in Alabama that sought to punish a second drug trafficking conviction, including for dealing marijuana, with a mandatory minimum death sentence. Sessions's views on drugs and crime have since softened.

Sessions supported the reduction (but not the elimination) of the sentencing disparity between crack cocaine and powdered cocaine, ultimately passed into law with the Fair Sentencing Act 2010.

On October 5, 2005, Sessions was one of nine senators who voted against a Senate amendment to a House bill that prohibited cruel, inhumane, or degrading treatment or punishment of individuals in the custody or under the physical control of the United States Government.

In November 2010, Sessions was a member of the Senate Judiciary Committee when the committee voted unanimously in favor of the Combating Online Infringement and Counterfeits Act (COICA), and sent the bill to the full Senate for consideration. The proposed law would allow the attorney general to ask a court to issue a restraining order on Internet domain names that host copyright-infringing material.

In October 2015, Sessions opposed Chairman Chuck Grassley's (R-IA) Sentencing Reform and Corrections Act, a bipartisan bill which sought to reduce mandatory minimum sentences for some nonviolent crimes. The United States Senate Committee on the Judiciary approved the bill by a vote of 15–5. According to The New York Times, Sessions, Tom Cotton, and David Perdue "stalled the bill in the Senate and sapped momentum from a simultaneous House effort". Senator Dick Durbin (D-IL), a co-sponsor of the bill, has said Sessions was its top opponent.

Sessions has been a strong supporter of civil forfeiture, the government practice of seizing property when it has allegedly been involved in a crime. Sessions opposes "any reform" of civil forfeiture legislation.

From March 2018 until the end of his service as attorney general, Sessions sat on the Federal Commission on School Safety.

=== Economic issues ===
Sessions voted for the 2001 and 2003 Bush tax cuts, and said he would vote to make them permanent if given the chance. He is a signer of Americans for Tax Reform's Taxpayer Protection Pledge.

Sessions was one of 25 senators to vote against the Emergency Economic Stabilization Act of 2008 (the bank bailout), arguing that it "undermines our heritage of law and order, and is an affront to the principle of separation of powers".

Sessions opposed the $837 billion American Recovery and Reinvestment Act of 2009, calling it "the largest spending bill in the history of the republic". In late 2011 he also expressed skepticism about the $447 billion jobs bill proposed by President Obama, and disputed the notion that the bill would be paid for without adding to the national debt.

=== Higher education and research ===
In 2013, Sessions sent a letter to National Endowment for the Humanities (NEH) enquiring why the foundation funded projects that he deemed frivolous. He also criticized the foundation for distributing books related to Islam to hundreds of U.S. libraries, saying "Using taxpayer dollars to fund education program grant questions that are very indefinite or in an effort to seemingly use Federal funds on behalf of just one religion, does not on its face appear to be the appropriate means to establish confidence in the American people that NEH expenditures are wise."

=== Social issues ===
Sessions voted against the Matthew Shepard Act, which added acts of bias-motivated violence based on sexual orientation and gender identity to federal hate-crimes law, commenting that it "has been said to cheapen the civil rights movement". Sessions "believes that a marriage is union between a man and a woman, and has routinely criticized the U.S. Supreme Court and activist lower courts when they try to judicially redefine marriage". Sessions voted in favor of advancing the Federal Marriage Amendment in 2004 and 2006, a U.S. constitutional amendment which would have permanently restricted federal recognition of marriages to those between a man and a woman. Sessions voted against the Don't Ask, Don't Tell Repeal Act of 2010.

Sessions has also said regarding the appointment of a gay Supreme Court justice, "I do not think that a person who acknowledges that they have gay tendencies is disqualified, per se, for the job" but "that would be a big concern that the American people might feel – might feel uneasy about that."

Sessions is against legalizing marijuana for either recreational or medicinal use. "I'm a big fan of the DEA," he said during a hearing with the Senate Judiciary Committee. Sessions was "heartbroken" and found "it beyond comprehension" when President Obama said that cannabis is not as dangerous as alcohol. In April 2016, he said that it was important to foster "knowledge that this drug is dangerous, you cannot play with it, it is not funny, it's not something to laugh about ... and to send that message with clarity that good people don't smoke marijuana." In March 2017, prepared remarks for a speech of his called cannabis "only slightly less awful" than heroin, and he argued that "lives [were] at stake" in legalizing the drug.

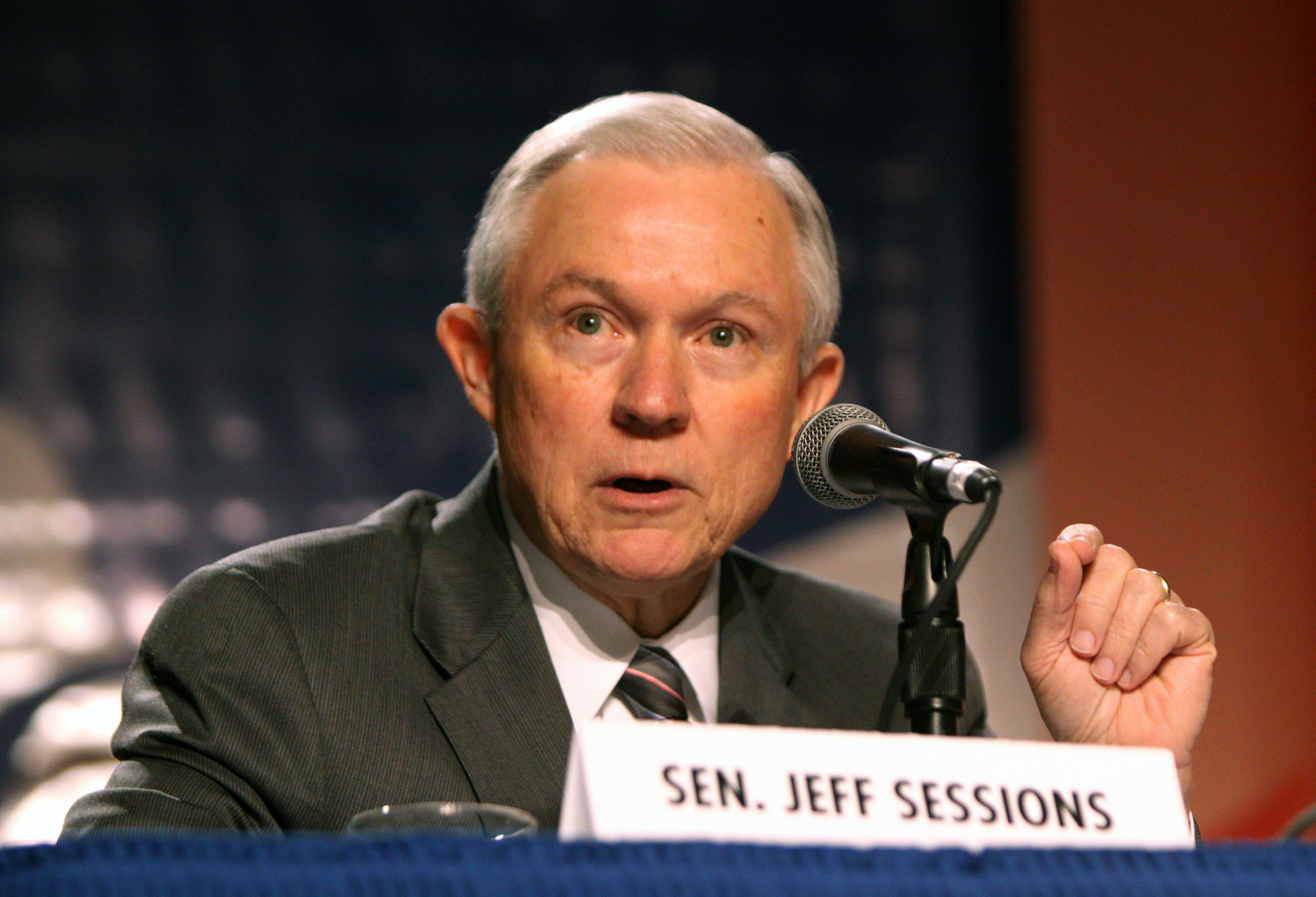
Jeff Sessions speaking at the Values Voter Summit in Washington, D.C.

Sessions believes "that sanctity of life begins at conception".

Sessions was one of 34 senators to vote against the Stem Cell Research Enhancement Act of 2007, which was vetoed by President Bush and would have provided funding for human embryonic stem cell research.

=== Health care reform ===
In 2006, Sessions coauthored legislation amending the Ryan White CARE Act to increase the share of HIV/AIDS funding going to rural states, including Alabama.

Sessions opposed President Barack Obama's health reform legislation; he voted against the Patient Protection and Affordable Care Act in December 2009, and he voted against the Health Care and Education Reconciliation Act of 2010.

Following Senator Ted Cruz's 21-hour speech opposing the Affordable Care Act in 2013, Sessions joined Cruz and 17 other senators in a failed vote against cloture on a comprehensive government funding bill that would have continued funding healthcare reform.

=== Energy and environment ===
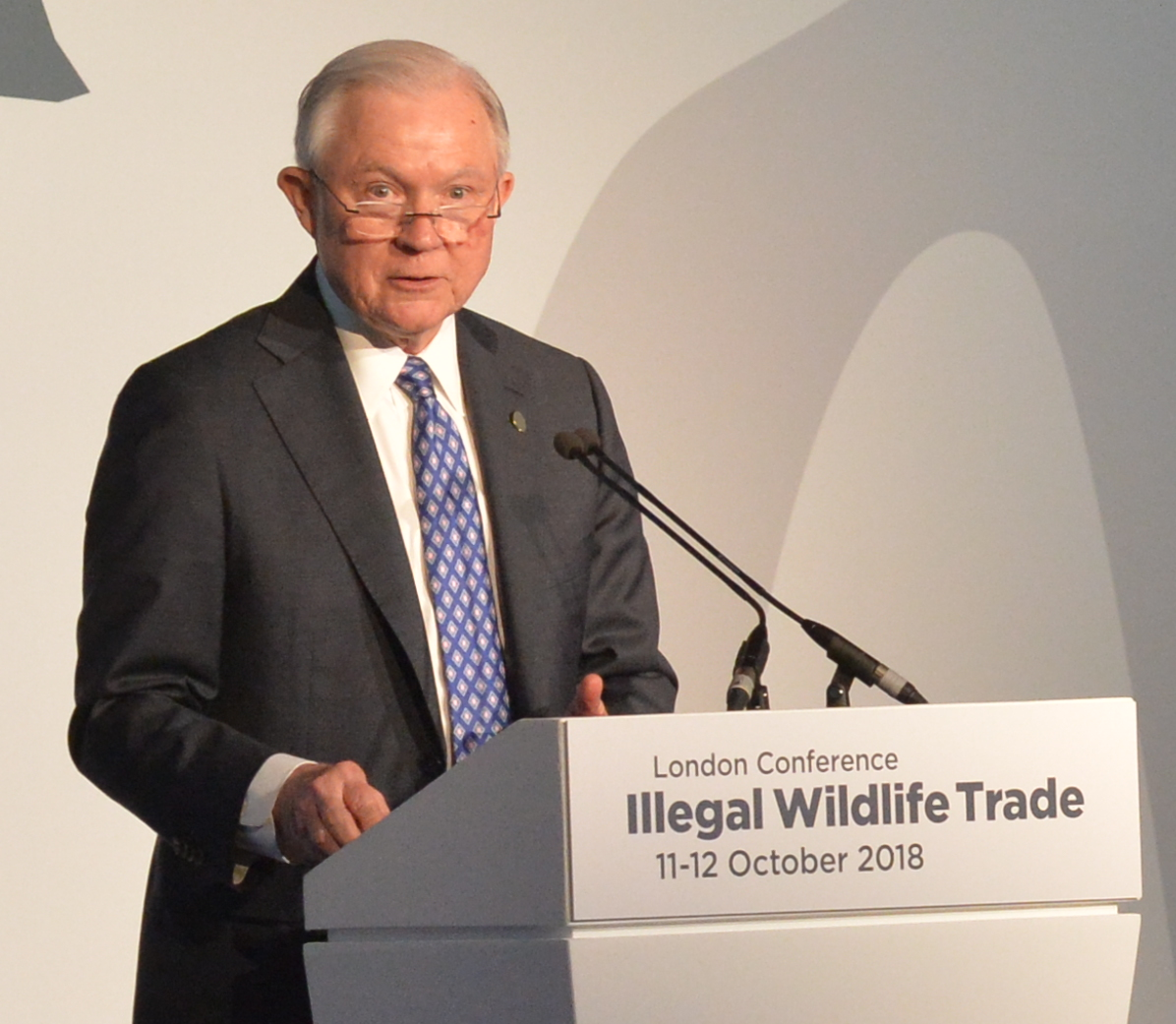
Sessions speaks at the Illegal Wildlife Trade Conference in London in 2018.

Sessions rejects the scientific consensus on climate change. He has voted in favor of legislation that would bar the Environmental Protection Agency from regulating greenhouse gases. He has voted to open the Arctic National Wildlife Refuge to oil drilling. Sessions is a proponent of nuclear power.

=== Judicial nominations ===
As a member of the Senate Judiciary Committee, Sessions defended unsuccessful circuit court nominee Charles W. Pickering against allegations of racism, saying he was "a leader for racial harmony". Sessions rejected criticisms of successful circuit court nominee Dennis Shedd's record, saying he "should have been commended for the rulings he has made". In 2003, Sessions viewed criticisms of Alabama Attorney General William H. Pryor Jr.'s ultimately successful circuit court appointment as being due to his faith, stating that "Are we not saying that good Catholics need not apply?"

Sessions was a supporter of the "nuclear option", a tactic considered by then-Senate Majority Leader Bill Frist in the spring of 2005 to change longstanding Senate rules to stop Democratic filibusters (or, "talking a bill to death") of some of George W. Bush's nominees to the federal courts. When the "Gang of 14" group of moderate senators reached an agreement to allow filibusters under "extraordinary circumstances", Sessions accepted the agreement but argued that "a return to the tradition of up-or-down votes on all judicial nominees would ... strengthen the Senate."

While serving as the ranking member on the Judiciary Committee in the 110th Congress, Sessions was the senior Republican who questioned Judge Sonia Sotomayor, President Barack Obama's nominee to succeed retiring Justice David Souter. Sessions focused on Sotomayor's views on empathy as a quality for a judge, arguing that "empathy for one party is always prejudice against another." Sessions also questioned the nominee about her views on the use of foreign law in deciding cases, as well as her role in the Puerto Rican Legal Defense and Education Fund (PRLDEF). On July 28, 2009, Sessions joined five Republican colleagues in voting against Sotomayor's nomination in the Judiciary Committee. The committee approved Sotomayor by a vote of 13–6. Sessions also voted against Sotomayor when her nomination came before the full Senate. He was one of 31 senators (all Republicans) to do so, while 68 voted to confirm the nominee.

Sessions also served as the ranking Republican on the Judiciary Committee during the nomination process for Elena Kagan, President Obama's nominee to succeed retired Justice John Paul Stevens. Sessions based his opposition on the nominee's lack of experience, her background as a political operative (Kagan had said that she worked in the Clinton White House not as a lawyer but as a policy adviser), and her record on guns, abortion, and gay rights. Sessions pointed out that Kagan "has a very thin record legally, never tried a case, never argued before a jury, only had her first appearance in the appellate courts a year ago".

Sessions focused the majority of his criticism on Kagan's treatment of the military while she was dean of Harvard Law School. During her tenure, Kagan reinstated the practice of requiring military recruiters to coordinate their activities through a campus veterans organization, rather than the school's Office of Career Services. Kagan argued that she was trying to comply with a law known as the Solomon Amendment, which barred federal funds from any college or university that did not grant military recruiters equal access to campus facilities. Sessions asserted that Kagan's action was a violation of the Solomon Amendment and that it amounted to "demeaning and punishing the military". He also argued that her action showed a willingness to place her politics above the law, and questioned "whether she had the intellectual honesty, the clarity of mind, that you would expect on the Supreme Court".

On July 20, 2010, Sessions and five Republican colleagues voted against Kagan's nomination. Despite this, the Judiciary Committee approved the nomination by a 13–6 vote. Sessions also voted against Kagan in the full Senate vote, joining 36 other senators (including one Democrat) in opposition. 63 senators voted to confirm Kagan. Following the vote, Sessions remarked on future nominations and elections, saying that Americans would "not forgive the Senate if we further expose our Constitution to revision and rewrite by judicial fiat to advance what President Obama says is a broader vision of what America should be".

In March 2016, following the death of Justice Antonin Scalia and President Obama's nomination of Merrick Garland to the U.S. Supreme Court, Sessions said the Senate "should not confirm a new Supreme Court justice until a new president is elected".

=== Legislation ===
In 1999, Sessions cosponsored the bill to award Rosa Parks the Congressional Gold Medal.

On December 11, 2013, Sessions cosponsored the Victims of Child Abuse Act Reauthorization Act of 2013, a bill that would reauthorize the Victims of Child Abuse Act of 1990 and would authorize funding through 2018 to help child abuse victims. Sessions argued that "there is no higher duty than protecting our nation's children, and this bill is an important step to ensure the most vulnerable children receive the care and support they deserve."

== Personal life ==
Sessions and his wife Mary have three children and, as of March 30, 2020, ten grandchildren. They are members of the Ashland Place United Methodist Church in Mobile; Jeff Sessions has taught Sunday school there.

== Electoral history ==
=== 2020 ===
2020 Alabama U.S. Senate Republican primary runoff election
Party	Candidate	Votes	%
Republican	Tommy Tuberville	333,890	60.7
Republican	Jeff Sessions	215,831	39.3

=== 2014 ===
2014 United States Senate election in Alabama
Party	Candidate	Votes	%
Republican	Jeff Sessions (incumbent)	795,606	97.25%
Write-ins	Other	22,484	2.75%
Total votes		818,090	100.00%
Republican hold			

=== 2008 ===
2008 Alabama U.S. Senate Republican primary election
Party	Candidate	Votes	%
Republican	Jeff Sessions (incumbent)	199,690	92.27
Republican	Zach McCann	16,718	7.73

2008 United States Senate election in Alabama
Party	Candidate	Votes	%	±%
Republican	Jeff Sessions (incumbent)	1,305,383	63.36%	+4.78%
Democratic	Vivian Davis Figures	752,391	36.52%	−3.31%
Write-ins		2,417	0.12%	+0.02%

=== 2002 ===
2002 United States Senate election in Alabama
Party	Candidate	Votes	%	±%
Republican	Jeff Sessions (incumbent)	792,561	58.58%	+6.13%
Democratic	Susan Parker	538,878	39.83%	−5.63%
Libertarian	Jeff Allen	20,234	1.5%	+0.06%
Write-ins		1,350	0.10%	+0.06%

=== 1996 ===
1996 Alabama U.S. Senate Republican primary election
Party	Candidate	Votes	%
Republican	Jeff Sessions	82,373	37.81
Republican	Sid McDonald	47,320	21.72
Republican	Charles Woods	24,409	11.20
Republican	Frank McRight	21,964	10.08
Republican	Walter D. Clark	18,745	8.60
Republican	Jimmy Blake	15,385	7.06
Republican	Albert Lipscomb	7,672	3.52

1996 Alabama U.S. Senate Republican primary runoff election
Party	Candidate	Votes	%
Republican	Jeff Sessions	81,681	59.26
Republican	Sid McDonald	56,156	40.74

1996 United States Senate election in Alabama
Party	Candidate	Votes	%
Republican	Jeff Sessions	786,436	52.45
Democratic	Roger Bedford	681,651	45.46
Libertarian	Mark Thornton	21,550	1.44
Natural Law	Charles R. Hebner	9,123	0.61
Write-in		633	0.04

=== 1994 ===
1994 Alabama Attorney General election
Party	Candidate	Votes	%
Republican	Jeff Sessions	667,010	56.87
Democratic	Jimmy Evans (incumbent)	505,137	43.07
Write-in		660	0.00

== See also ==
- 2017 dismissal of U.S. attorneys
- Mueller report
- Nobody Is Above the Law
- Russian interference in the 2016 United States elections

== Sources ==
Legal offices
Preceded by William Kimbrough	United States Attorney for the Southern District of Alabama; 1981–1993	Succeeded by Don Foster
Preceded by Jimmy Evans	Attorney General of Alabama; 1995–1997	Succeeded by Bill Pryor
Preceded by Loretta Lynch	United States Attorney General; 2017–2018	Succeeded by William Barr
Party political offices
Preceded by Spencer Bachus	Republican nominee for Attorney General of Alabama; 1994	Succeeded by William H. Pryor Jr.
Preceded by William J. Cabaniss	Republican nominee for U.S. Senator from Alabama (Class 2); 1996, 2002, 2008, 2014	Succeeded by Roy Moore
Preceded by Jon Kyl	Chair of the Senate Republican Steering Committee; 2003–2007	Succeeded by Jim DeMint
U.S. Senate
Preceded by Howell Heflin	U.S. Senator (Class 2) from Alabama; 1997–2017; Served alongside: Richard Shelby	Succeeded by Luther Strange
Preceded by Arlen Specter	Ranking Member of the Senate Judiciary Committee; 2009–2011	Succeeded by Chuck Grassley
Preceded by Judd Gregg	Ranking Member of the Senate Budget Committee; 2011–2015	Succeeded by Bernie Sanders
U.S. order of precedence (ceremonial)
Preceded by Betsy DeVos as Former U.S. Cabinet Member	Order of precedence of the United States as Former U.S. Cabinet Member	Succeeded by Tom Price as Former U.S. Cabinet Member
