= 2002 United States Senate election in Alabama =

- November 5, 2002
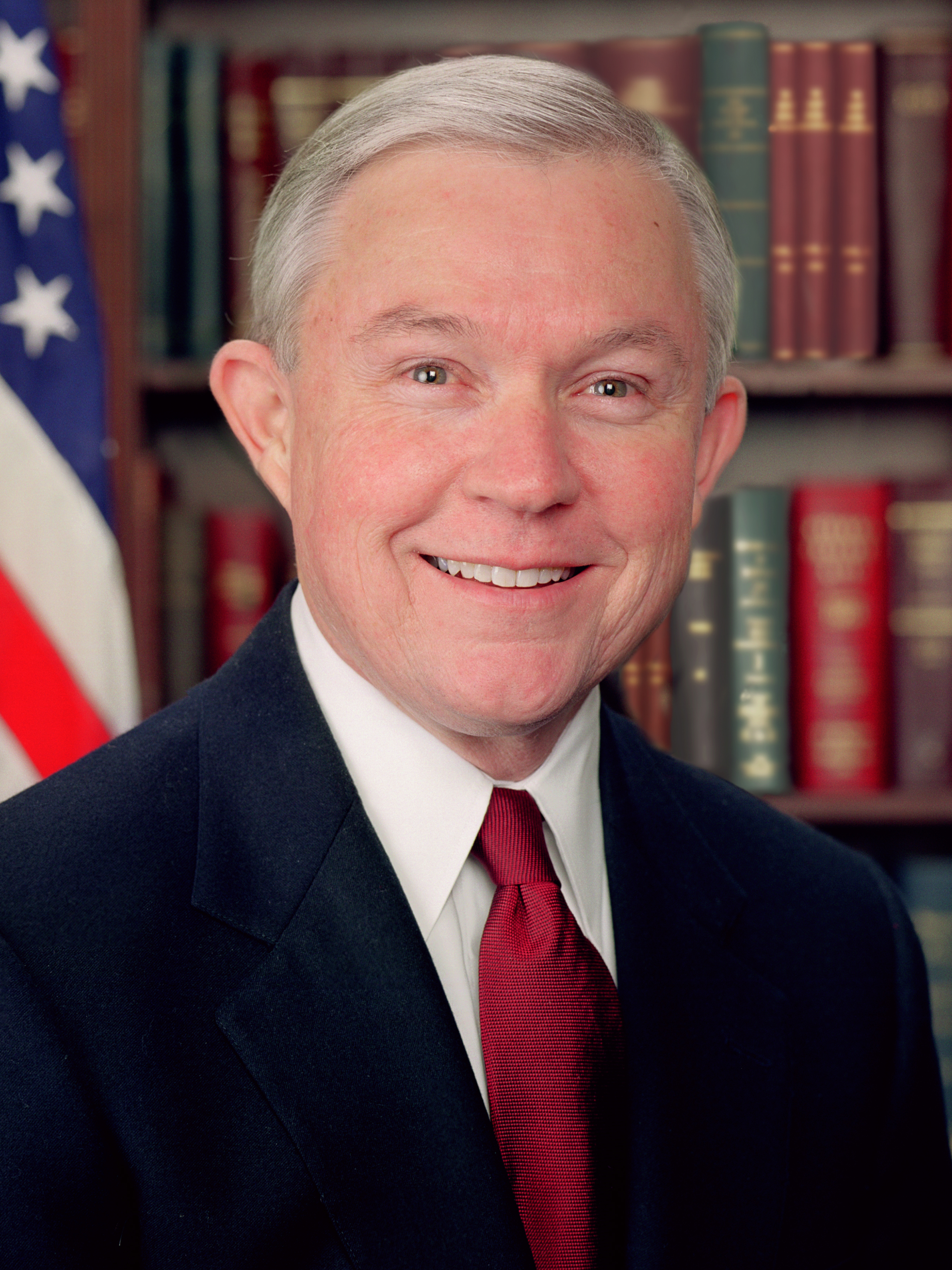

Nominee	Jeff Sessions	Susan Parker
Party	Republican	Democratic
Popular vote	792,561	538,878
Percentage	58.58%	39.83%
- County results Sessions: 50–60% 60–70% 70–80% Parker: 40–50% 50–60% 60–70% 70–80% 80–90%
U.S. senator before election
Jeff Sessions
Republican
Elected U.S. Senator
Jeff Sessions
Republican

The 2002 United States Senate election in Alabama was held on November 5, 2002. Incumbent Republican U.S. Senator Jeff Sessions won re-election to a second term. Sessions became the first Republican to be elected to two full terms to the Senate from the state. As of 2022, this is the most recent Senate election in Alabama in which Colbert and Lawrence counties voted for the Democratic candidate.

== Background ==
In the 1968 presidential election, Alabama supported native son and American Independent Party candidate George Wallace over both Richard Nixon and Hubert Humphrey. Wallace was the official Democratic candidate in Alabama, while Humphrey was listed as the "National Democratic". In 1976, Democratic candidate Jimmy Carter from Georgia carried the state, the region, and the nation, but Democratic control of the region slipped after that.

Since 1980, conservative Alabama voters have increasingly voted for Republican candidates at the federal level, especially in presidential elections. By contrast, Democratic candidates have been elected to many state-level offices and comprised a longstanding majority in the Alabama Legislature.

== Republican primary ==
=== Candidates ===
- Jeff Sessions, incumbent U.S. Senator since 1997

Sessions was not challenged in the primary.

== Democratic primary ==
=== Candidates ===
- Julian L. McPhillips, Attorney and candidate for Attorney General in 1978
- Susan Parker, Alabama State Auditor
- Wayne Sowell, candidate for governor in 1998 and candidate for the U.S. House in 2000

=== Results ===
Primary results by county Parker: 70–80%; 60–70%; 50–60%; 40–50%; McPhillips: 70–80%; 60–70%; 50–60%; 40–50%

Primary runoff results by county Parker: 90–100%; 80–90%; 70–80%; 60–70%; 50–60%; McPhillips: 60–70%; 50–60%

Original on June 4

Democratic primary results
Party	Candidate	Votes	%
Democratic	Susan Parker	190,978	47.99%
Democratic	Julian L. McPhillips	170,222	42.78%
Democratic	Wayne Sowell	36,719	9.23%
Total votes		397,919	100.00%

McPhillips won many counties in the southern part of the state, but Parker won the most counties. Sowell endorsed Parker for the runoff.

Runoff on June 25

Democratic primary runoff results
Party	Candidate	Votes	%
Democratic	Susan Parker	176,708	65.15%
Democratic	Julian L. McPhillips	94,540	34.85%
Total votes		271,248	100.00%

== General election ==
=== Candidates ===
- Jeff Allen (L)
- Susan Parker (D), Alabama State Auditor
- Jeff Sessions (R), Incumbent U.S. Senator

=== Debates ===
- Complete video of debate, October 20, 2002

=== Predictions ===
Source	Ranking	As of
Sabato's Crystal Ball	Safe R	November 4, 2002

=== Results ===
2002 United States Senate election, Alabama
Party	Candidate	Votes	%	±%
Republican	Jeff Sessions (incumbent)	792,561	58.58%	+6.13%
Democratic	Susan Parker	538,878	39.83%	−5.63%
Libertarian	Jeff Allen	20,234	1.50%	+0.06%
Write-in		1,350	0.10%	+0.06%
Majority		253,683	18.75%	
Turnout		1,353,023		
Republican hold		Swing		

==== Counties that flipped from Democratic to Republican ====
- Coosa (Largest city: Goodwater)
- Chambers (Largest city: Valley)
- Barbour (largest city: Eufaula)
- Conecuh (largest city: Evergreen)
- Butler (Largest city: Greenville)
- Crenshaw (Largest city: Luverne)
- Washington (Largest city: Chatom)
- Choctaw (Largest city: Butler)
- Jackson (Largest city: Scottsboro)
- Cherokee (Largest city: Centre)
- Fayette (Largest city: Fayette)
- Franklin (Largest city: Russellville)
- Marion (Largest city: Hamilton)
- Walker (Largest city: Jasper)
- Lauderdale (Largest city: Florence)
- Lamar (Largest city: Vernon)
- Etowah (Largest city: Gadsden)

== See also ==
- 2002 United States Senate election
