= Sentencing Reform and Corrections Act =

The Sentencing Reform and Corrections Act (S. 2123, also called the Sentencing Reform and Corrections Act of 2015 or SRCA) is a bipartisan criminal justice reform bill introduced into the United States Senate on October 1, 2015, by Chuck Grassley, a Republican senator from Iowa and the chairman of the United States Senate Committee on the Judiciary.

== Provisions ==
The bill would do the following:

- Make retroactive the reduced sentences for crack convictions (Fair Sentencing Act).
- Reduce mandatory sentences, also known as mandatory minimums, for people convicted more than three times for drug crimes, down from life without parole after the third offense to 25 years.
- Reduce mandatory sentences for armed career criminals and violent firearm offenses from a 15-year minimum down to 10 years.
- Reduce mandatory sentences for drug crimes from 15 to 10 years.
- Limit the use of solitary confinement on juvenile prisoners.
- Require the federal government to compile a list of every law that includes a criminal penalty.
- Increase mandatory minimums for crimes such as domestic violence.
- Require the Federal Bureau of Prisons to spend more money to offer more programs and services attempting to reduce recidivism rates and make prisoners participate in productive activities.

The bill would only apply to federal prisoners without changing anything in states' laws or judicial systems.

== Sponsors ==
In addition to Grassley, other sponsors of the bill when it was first introduced included:

- Senate Judiciary Ranking Member Patrick Leahy (D-VT)
- Senate Judiciary Member Mike Lee (R-UT)
- Senate Judiciary Member Sheldon Whitehouse (D-RI)
- Senate Majority Whip John Cornyn (R-TX)
- Senate Minority Whip Richard Durbin (D-IL)
- Senator Charles Schumer (D-NY)
- Senator Cory Booker (D-NJ)

The bill added the following additional sponsors when it was re-introduced in October 2017:

- Senator Roy Blunt (R-MO)
- Senator Dianne Feinstein (D-CA)
- Senator Jeff Flake (R-AZ)
- Senator Lindsey Graham (R-SC)
- Senator Tim Scott (R-SC)

== Revisions ==
To gain more support for the measure, bill sponsors announced revisions on April 28, 2016. Most notably, the proposed amendments would remove provisions related to armed career criminals, add new sentence enhancements for crimes involving fentanyl, and remove the retroactivity of the additional proposed safety valves.

The provision making the Fair Sentencing Act retroactive would remain intact.

== Timeline ==
- Oct. 1, 2015 — Bill is introduced.
- Oct. 22, 2015 — Senate Judiciary Committee votes 15–5 to send the bill to the floor for a vote.
- Oct. 4, 2017 — The bill was reintroduced as S. 1917.

== Opposition ==
Tom Cotton, a Republican senator from Arkansas, has led a group of other Republican congresspeople who are opposed to the bill. Cotton has argued that rates of murder and other violent crime have decreased so much since the 1990s because of "higher mandatory minimums put in place in the 1980s coupled with vigilant policing strategies pioneered by Rudy Giuliani and other American mayors and law enforcement officials." He has also argued that the bill, if passed, would lead to the release of thousands of violent felons.

== Support ==
On the day that the bill was introduced, Molly Gill, of Families Against Mandatory Minimums, said that "it doesn’t go as far as we would like." On October 3, 2015, Marc Mauer, the executive director of the Sentencing Project, told NPR that the bill "is the most substantial criminal justice reform legislation introduced since the inception of the 'tough on crime' movement that brought crimes rate drastically down over the last decades."

On October 17, 2017, National Football League Commissioner Roger Goodell and Seattle Seahawks wide receiver Doug Baldwin penned a letter in support of the legislation, writing that the bill would "increase rehabilitation. If enacted, it would be a positive next step in our collective efforts to move our nation forward."

== Criticism ==
Writing in Mother Jones the day after the bill was introduced, Shane Bauer described the bill as "remarkably unambitious" in addressing mass incarceration and argued that it "doesn't live up to its own hype." The bill has been criticized by Nicholas Wooldridge, a defense attorney from Las Vegas, for "creat[ing] the appearance of reform without doing much of anything to effect actual reform."

In March 2016, Marc Morial, the president of the National Urban League, asked Congress to delay action on both the House and Senate versions of the bill until the information could be obtained on its possible effects on blacks and Hispanics.
