= May 1966 =

Month of 1966

<<	May 1966					>>
Su	Mo	Tu	We	Th	Fr	Sa
1	2	3	4	5	6	7
8	9	10	11	12	13	14
15	16	17	18	19	20	21
22	23	24	25	26	27	28
29	30	31

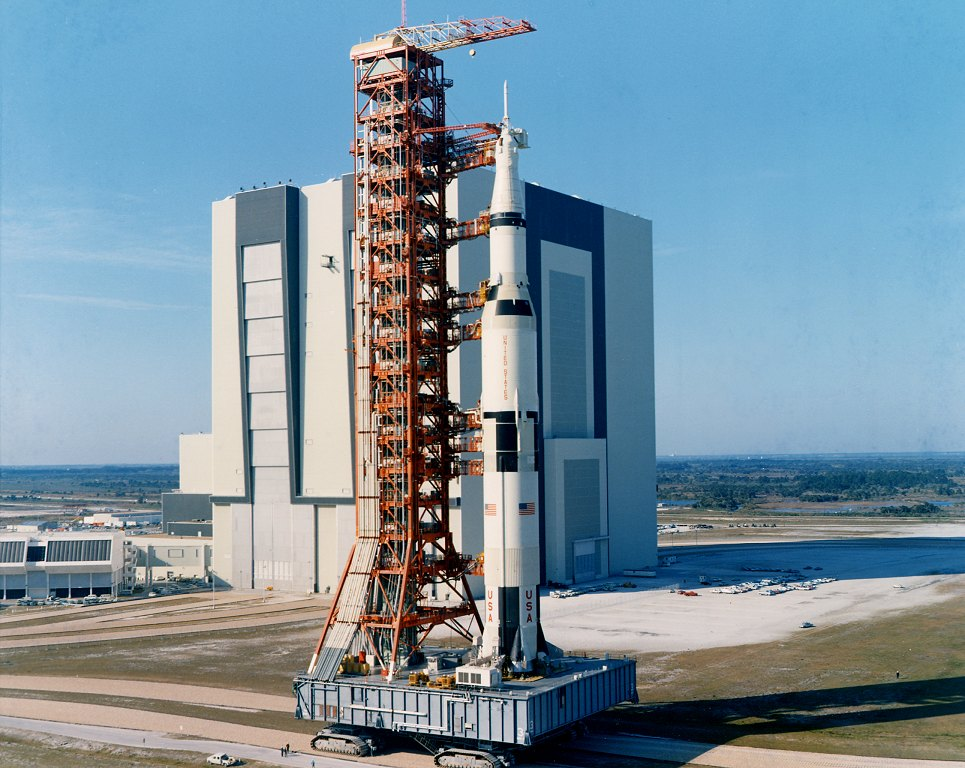
May 25, 1966: NASA unveils the gigantic Saturn V rocket (pictured: 1969 Apollo 10 rocket)

May 26, 1966: British Guiana becomes independent as Guyana

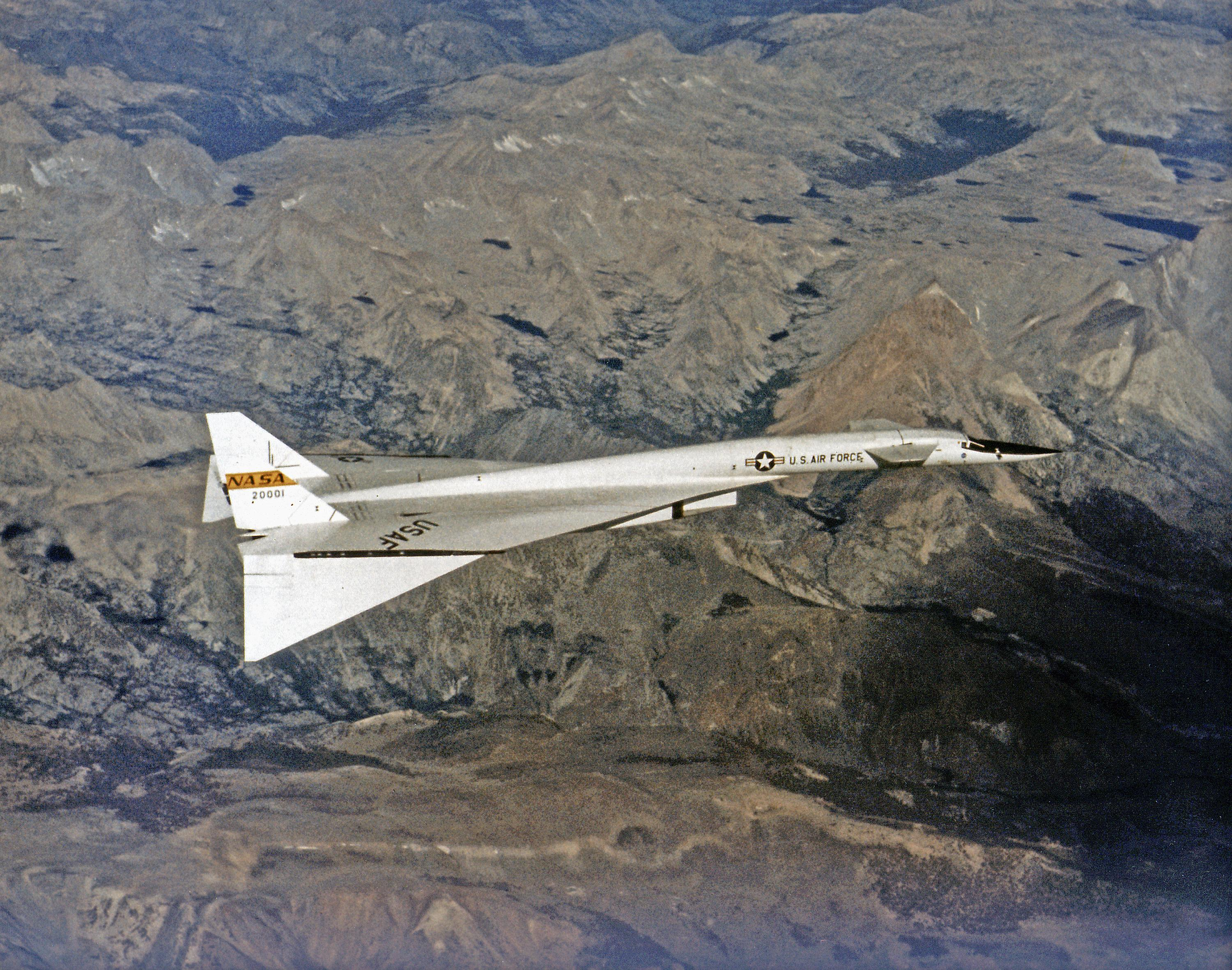
May 19, 1966: Flight of the Valkyrie first to pass Mach 3

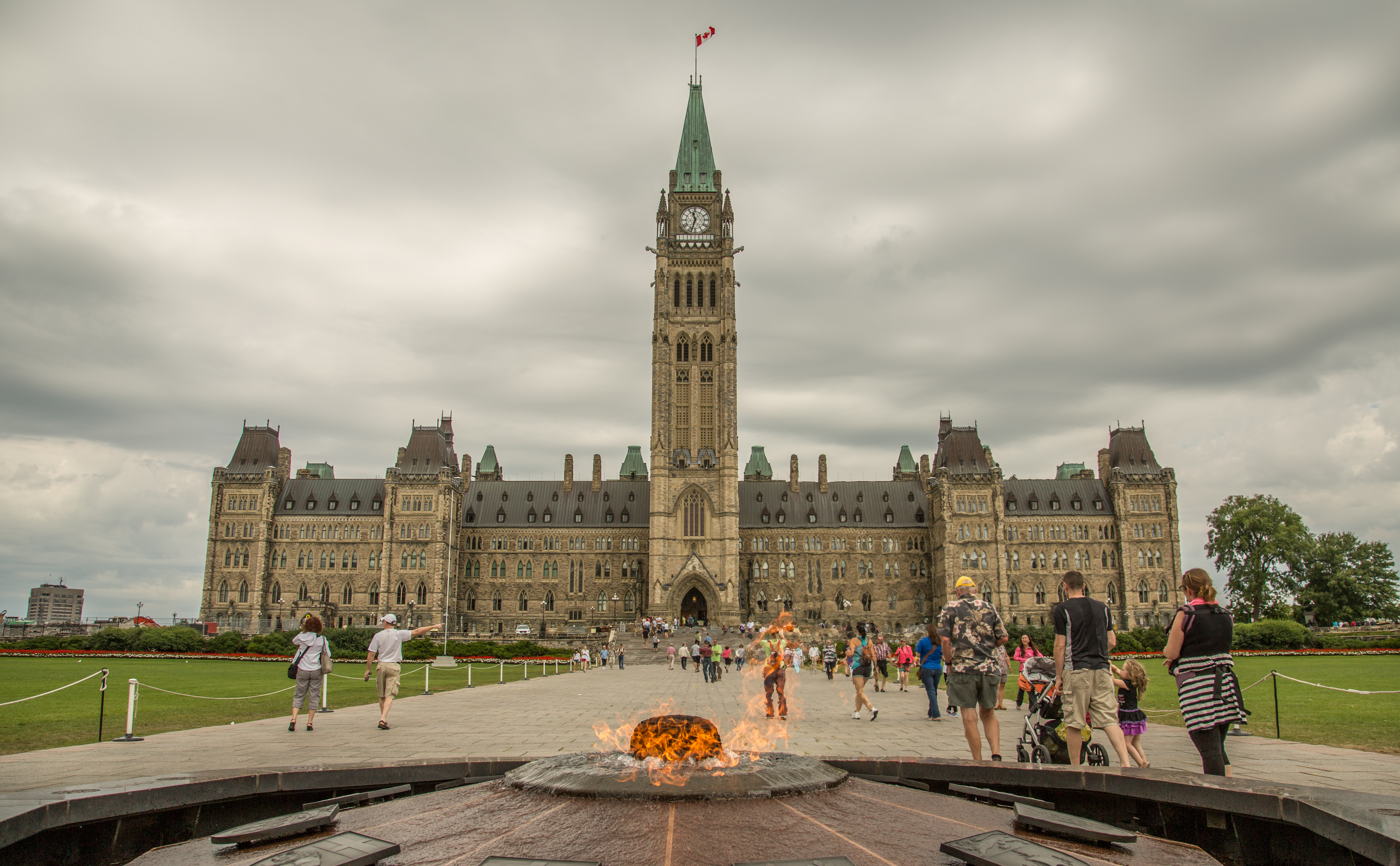
May 18, 1966: Canadian Parliament building bombed by terrorists

The following events occurred in May 1966:

== May 1, 1966 (Sunday) ==
- Nick Piantanida, an American amateur parachute jumper, was fatally injured while attempting to break the world parachute altitude record. Secured inside a small Styrofoam-insulated gondola, he began his ascent for a planned supersonic free fall from over 120,000 feet (37,000 m). Ground controllers listening to the communications link with the Strato Jump III were startled by the sound of rushing air and a sudden, cut-off call over the radio to abort, Piantanida's oxygen mask having depressurized at about the 57,000-foot (17,000 m) mark. Ground controllers immediately jettisoned the balloon at close to 56,000 feet (17,000 m) — higher than the cruising altitude for commercial jets — and Piantanida's gondola took 25 minutes to parachute to the ground, near Lakefield, Minnesota. The lack of oxygen left Piantanida with brain damage and he would remain in a coma until his death on August 29.
- For the first time in the Vietnam War, the United States attacked Cambodia, after the U.S. 1st Infantry Division came under mortar fire while patrolling in the Tây Ninh Province along South Vietnam's border with the neutral nation. When it was determined that the shelling was coming from the other side of the Cai Bac River that separated the two nations, Lt. Col. Richard L. Prillaman of the 2nd Infantry invoked the right of self-defense within the rules of engagement, and fired shells across the river into a Viet Cong position on the other side.
- Senator Carlos Lleras Restrepo of the Liberal Party won the Colombian presidential election, easily defeating his little-known challenger, lawyer Jose Jaramillo Giraldo. With a margin of 1,891,175 votes against the 742,133 for Jaramillo, Lleras Restrepo polled 71.4% of the ballots. More than 60 percent of eligible voters declined to participate in the election, the highest ever up to that time.
- The First of May Group, an armed Spanish organization fighting the regime of dictator Francisco Franco, staged its first attack, kidnapping the ecclesiastic adviser for the Spanish Embassy to the Vatican, Monsignor Marcos Ussia. Ussia, taken captive as he was driving to his house, remained missing for ten days, before he was released unharmed on May 11.
- Fantasy novelist Diana L. Paxson staged the first "medieval-themed" event for what would later be called the Society for Creative Anachronism, restaging combat between armored knights, as well as recreating other aspects of festivals in medieval England.
- The Genevieve E. Yates Memorial Centre was officially opened at Lethbridge, Alberta, Canada.
- Born: Abdelhakim Belhadj, Libyan politician and military leader; in Souq al Jum'aa, Tripoli

== May 2, 1966 (Monday) ==
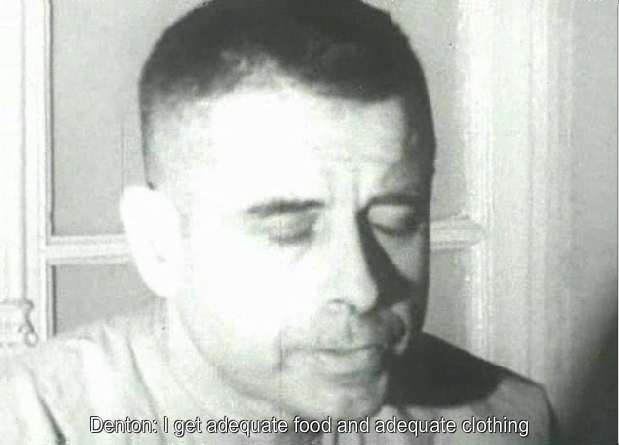
Denton in POW camp

- U.S. Navy Commander Jeremiah Denton, an American prisoner of war in North Vietnam, was interviewed in a prison camp by Japanese TV reporter Toshichi Suzuki of the Nihon Dempa Kogyo (NDK) news service, for 10 minutes. The edited newsreel was shown on North Vietnamese television and in movie theaters, then released to Japan where it was shown on Japanese TV on May 7. Denton, shot down on July 18, 1965, was held in the Cu Loc Detention Camp, nicknamed "The Zoo" by his fellow POWs, near Hanoi. He told Suzuki, "I believe in my government, yes sir. I am a member of that government and will support it as long as I live." Asked about prison conditions he said he got "adequate food and clothing and medical care when I require it." A reporter noted that "He spoke slowly and rolled his eyes continuously, at times staring blankly at the ceiling. He would occasionally close his eyes tightly when asked to answer a question." On the film, unbeknownst to his captors, he was blinking or closing his eyes to spell out "T-O-R-T-U-R-E" in Morse code. He would later be elected U.S. Senator for Alabama in 1980 and serve one term.
- In Dallas, leaders of eight separate American religious denominations opened discussions for an eventual merger of Protestant churches. Meeting in the talks were leaders of the Methodist Church (USA), the Episcopal Church, the United Presbyterian Church, the United Church of Christ, the Disciples of Christ, the Evangelical United Brethren, the African Methodist Episcopal Church, and the Presbyterian Church in the United States, encompassing 25 million members. On May 5, leaders of the eight denominations unanimously approved a document outlining common principles for a merger that would take place between 1970 and 1979.
- Renfrew Airport, Glasgow's domestic air terminal, ceased operations; the last flight to depart flew a short distance to the new facility, Abbotsinch Airport. The first scheduled arrival was a chartered Vickers Viscount turboprop, flown from Edinburgh by British European Airways, which carried 64 members of the architectural firm that had designed the new facility. However, on April 26, a Royal Air Force plane had mistakenly landed at the new airport after confusing it with the old one.
- The government of the Democratic Republic of the Congo announced that the nation's major cities would be restored to their pre-colonial names, effective on June 30, the sixth anniversary of independence. The capital, Leopoldville, was changed to Kinshasa; Elisabethville became Lubumbashi; Stanleyville to Kisangani; Coquilhatville to Mbandaka; and Paulis to Isiro.

== May 3, 1966 (Tuesday) ==
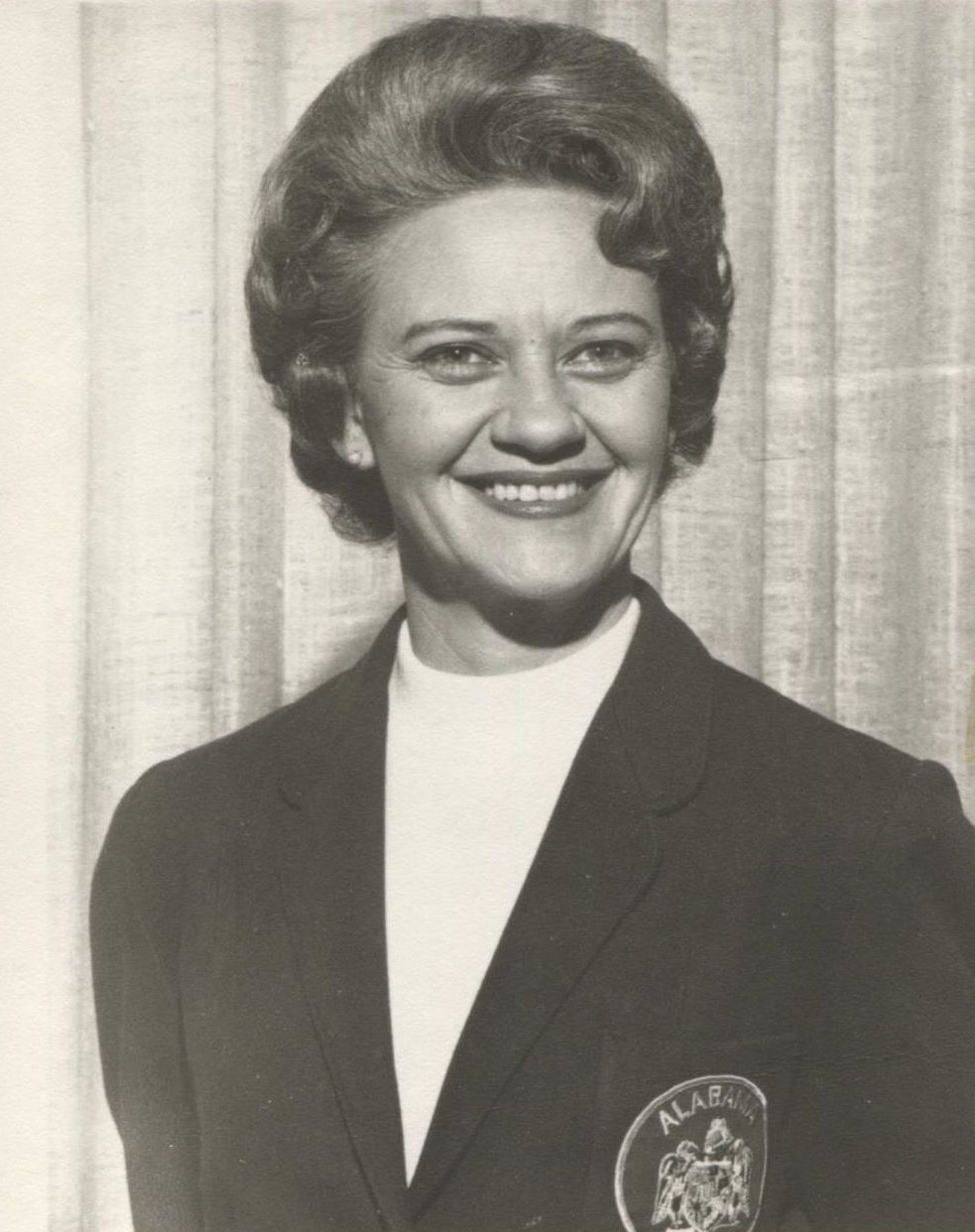
Governor Lurleen Wallace

- Lurleen Wallace, the wife of Alabama Governor George C. Wallace, overwhelmingly won the Democratic Party primary for the nomination for Governor of Alabama, a guarantee of victory in November in the overwhelmingly Democratic state. By law, George Wallace was barred from serving consecutive terms as governor, but could continue to be the de facto executive by having his wife hold the office. Governor Wallace would die a little more than two years later, on another primary election day (May 7, 1968), from intestinal cancer. After being treated successfully in 1965, the cancer had recurred only five months after she took office.
- Prime Minister of Canada Lester B. Pearson narrowly avoided a censure by the Canadian House of Commons, after being accused of perjury for contradicting testimony given by Canadian police in hearings on the Gerda Munsinger sex scandal. The vote, which would likely have brought down the Pearson government and led to the calling of new parliamentary elections, failed to pass, 106 to 133.
- "Pirate" radio stations Swinging Radio England and Britain Radio commenced broadcasting on AM, with a combined potential 100,000 watts, from the same ship anchored off the south coast of England in international waters.

== May 4, 1966 (Wednesday) ==
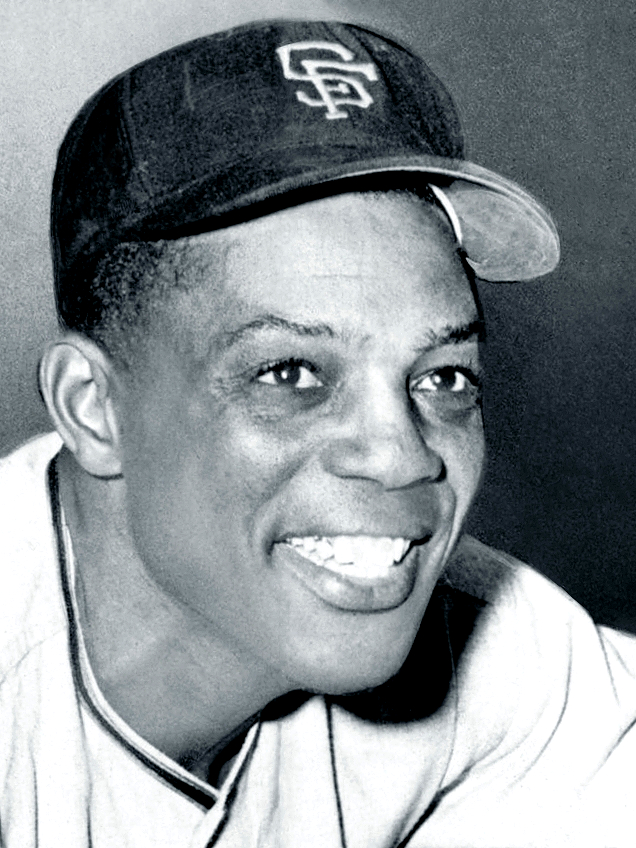
Willie Mays

- Center fielder Willie Mays of the San Francisco Giants hit his 512th home run, breaking the National League record held by Mel Ott. At the time, that was the fourth best career record for all Major League Baseball players, but Mays would surpass Ted Williams and Jimmie Foxx by August, to be second only to Babe Ruth.
- The Italian automaker FIAT (Fabbrica Italiana Automobili Torino) concluded an agreement with the Soviet government to build a car factory in the Soviet Union, with plans for production of 600,000 small and medium-sized cars annually. Vittorio Valletta, the FIAT President, signed the contract with Minister of Automotive Industries Aleksandr Tarasov, and in 1969, the first VAZ (Volzhsky Avtomobilny Zavod) automobiles would roll off of the assembly line at the factory, located at Togliattigrad (formerly Stavropol-on-Volga).
- Baseball shortstop Larry Brown of the Cleveland Indians was seriously (and almost fatally) injured after he collided with teammate Leon Wagner during a game against the New York Yankees. Brown and Wagner were both attempting to field a fly ball hit by Roger Maris; Brown suffered multiple skull fractures, lapsed into a coma, and was hospitalized for several weeks.
- A penumbral lunar eclipse took place. "No perceptible change in the appearance of the moon will be noticed in the areas where this eclipse is visible", a report noted at the time, because the Moon was only entering a part of Earth's shadow.
- Died: Edmond Locard, 88, French criminologist who formulated the basic principle of forensic science: "Every contact leaves a trace", now known as Locard's exchange principle

== May 5, 1966 (Thursday) ==
- The first of three strikes by bank employees in Ireland began, shutting down 900 banks in both the Republic of Ireland and in Northern Ireland. These strikes would provide economists with a unique opportunity to study the functioning of a modern economy without access to cash deposits. "Businesses with large cash intakes each day are getting rid of their surplus by making deals with firms that have large weekly payrolls but take no cash. One large brewery has taken on the role of banker for pubs. Saloons are favorite places for cashing cheques", a report during the strike noted. An early settlement would be reached in Northern Ireland, but the strike in the Irish Republic would not be settled until July 29. A second strike, in 1970, would last more than six months, and the third and final one would go for more than two months in 1976.
- In Game Six of the best-of-seven Stanley Cup finals, the Montreal Canadiens defeated the Detroit Red Wings, 3–2 in sudden death overtime, to win the championship of the National Hockey League. Detroit had won the first two games of the series, and Montreal then won the next four. After 2 minutes and 20 seconds in the extra period, Henri Richard rebounded the blocked shot of Dave Balon and sent the puck past the Red Wings' Roger Crozier for the win.
- In the 1966 European Cup Winners' Cup Final at Hampden Parkin Glasgow, Borussia Dortmund of West Germany defeated England's Liverpool F.C., 2–1, at 17 minutes into extra time after the game was tied at the end of 90 minutes. Reinhard Libuda hit a "perfectly judged cross" past Tommy Lawrence, who had blocked the first shot at goal.
- The 1966 Cannes Film Festival opened.
- Born:
  - Josh Weinstein, American television writer and producer, known for his work on the animated comedy series The Simpsons; in Washington, D.C.
  - Sergei Stanishev, Soviet-born, Prime Minister of Bulgaria from 2005 to 2009; in Kherson, Ukrainian SSR

== May 6, 1966 (Friday) ==
- South Vietnam's Prime Minister Nguyễn Cao Kỳ backtracked on the April promise to hold free elections for a civilian government by September 1966, announcing instead that the late September voting would be limited to an assembly that would draft a new constitution. Upon completion of that document, an election for a national legislature would be scheduled, and that legislature would then appoint a civilian government. Until then, Kỳ told reporters in Cần Thơ, the military regime would stay in power "for at least another year".
- Ian Brady, 28, was found guilty on three charges of murdering children, and his partner-in-crime, 23-year-old Myra Hindley, guilty of murdering two of the victims, 17-year-old Edward Evans and 10-year-old Lesley Ann Downey, as the Moors murders trial concluded. Hindley was acquitted of assisting in Brady's murder of 12-year-old John Kilbride. Their multiple life sentences (three for Brady, two for Hindley) were set to run concurrently. Trial had been held in Chester, in the county of Cheshire.
- Manned Spacecraft Center (MSC) Assistant Director for Flight Crew Operations Donald K. Slayton and several other astronauts (notably Joseph P. Kerwin) voiced concern regarding the purposes and proposed work statement for the S-IVB spent-stage experiment support module. As well as pointing out the general lack of experiment planning and hardware, Slayton and Kerwin noted a number of operational and safety concerns surrounding purging the stage's hydrogen tank to create a habitable structure in space.

== May 7, 1966 (Saturday) ==
- In China, Chairman Mao Zedong issued the "May Seventh Directive", declaring that "the phenomenon of bourgeois intellectuals reigning over our schools can no longer be allowed to continue." Starting in 1968, professors, teachers, government bureaucrats and other white-collar workers would be moved to rural areas, sometimes for several years, to work on farms in order to "live and labor like peasants"; in their recreational time, they were expected to study the works of Mao and of Karl Marx. The forced labor camps would be referred to during the Cultural Revolution as "May 7th Cadre Schools".
- Founded by Augustus "Gusty" Spence, the paramilitary "Ulster Volunteer Force" (UVF), based in the Shankill area of Belfast, committed the first of many bombings and assassinations in its campaign "to ensure continued rule by the Protestant majority in Northern Ireland". The UVF's first act was to detonate a petrol bomb outside a Catholic-owned pub in Shankill. Instead, the fire killed Matilda Gould, a 76-year-old Protestant widow who lived next door to the pub.
- The Rolling Stones released "Paint It Black", which would become the first number one hit single in the U.S. and UK to feature music from the Indian string instrument, the sitar (played by guitarist Brian Jones).

== May 8, 1966 (Sunday) ==
- Lu Dingyi, China's Minister of Culture and director of the Central Propaganda Department of the Chinese Communist Party, was summoned to a meeting of the Party's Politburo, without being informed of the purpose. When he arrived, he learned that the meeting was about him, and he was accused of promoting a "reactionary line of culture", fired, and put under arrest.
- José Joaquín Trejos Fernández was sworn into office for a four-year term as the new President of Costa Rica, succeeding Francisco Orlich Bolmarcich.
- Died: Erich Pommer, 76, German film producer

== May 9, 1966 (Monday) ==
- The People's Republic of China detonated its third nuclear weapon, and claimed that the bomb contained "thermonuclear material", suggesting that they had developed their own hydrogen bomb. However, meteorologists in Japan said that there was no abnormal atmospheric pressure detected after the blast and that "we don't believe that the latest Chinese device was a hydrogen bomb of a megaton class". China had exploded its first atomic bomb on October 16, 1964. Two days later, however, Japanese scientists noted that the radioactive fallout from the test was more than 30 times as great as that from either of the two earlier tests, and American officials concluded that the bomb, estimated to be 120 kilotons, was six times larger than previous weapons. The thermonuclear material in the bomb, which had been dropped from Xian H-6 bomber over the test site, would be determined later to be the isotope Lithium-6; China would successfully explode its first hydrogen bomb on June 17, 1967.
- The Eighteenth Amendment of the Constitution of India was introduced in the Lok Sabha by Jaisukh Lal Hathi, then Minister of State in the Ministry of Home Affairs, but the bill failed in this first attempt.

== May 10, 1966 (Tuesday) ==
- At a press conference in New York, Bob Hermann and William D. Cox announced the founding of the North American Professional Soccer League, with plans to play professional soccer during the autumn of 1967 in 11 cities. The league, renamed the National Professional Soccer League, would play in ten cities in 1967, and then merge half of its teams with a rival organization, the United Soccer Association to create the North American Soccer League.
- The South West Africa People's Organization (SWAPO) outlined its battle plan for liberating South West Africa (now Namibia) from the domination of South Africa. The strategy, which would first be implemented on September 26, called for dividing the Namibian battle theater into several regions, and to concentration on the killing of policemen and the destruction of police stations.
- Thirty African members of the United Nations demanded that the UN Security Council meet immediately to invoke harsher penalties against the white minority government of Rhodesia. The protest came as three envoys of Rhodesian Prime Minister Ian Smith were in London to negotiate with the United Kingdom.
- Born: Genaro Hernández, Mexican-American boxer (d. 2011); in Los Angeles

== May 11, 1966 (Wednesday) ==
- Replying to a suggestion by MSC Director Robert R. Gilruth that the Apollo Applications Program (AAP) capitalize on Apollo hardware to an even greater extent by using refurbished Apollo CSMs, NASA Associate Administrator for Manned Space Flight George E. Mueller deferred any action toward implementing a competitive effort for such work. This was necessary, he said, because of the present unsettled nature of AAP planning. Because of revisions in AAP mission planning as a result of joint Center-Headquarters discussions in mid-April 1966, however, Mueller told Gilruth that he was ordering Marshall Space Flight Center (MSFC) to undertake a parallel study to evaluate a refurbished CSM versus an Apollo Lunar Module (LEM) laboratory for the AAP experiments program.
- Real Madrid of Spain defeated Partizan Belgrade of Yugoslavia, 2 to 1, to win the European Cup in the final, held at Heysel Stadium in Brussels.

== May 12, 1966 (Thursday) ==
- Busch Memorial Stadium opened in St Louis, Missouri, four days after the previous Busch Stadium (originally Sportsman's Park) hosted its last St. Louis Cardinals baseball game. The old park's home plate was ceremonially transferred, by helicopter, to the new park; the new Busch Stadium would last until 2005. The new park would also serve as the home of the St. Louis Cardinals NFL team until that team's move to Phoenix, Arizona, in 1988.
- Born: Stephen Baldwin, American film actor and the youngest of the four Baldwin brothers; in Massapequa, New York

== May 13, 1966 (Friday) ==
- Radio Peking claimed that five American fighter planes had crossed from North Vietnam and into Chinese airspace, and that the fighters used guided missiles to shoot down a People's Liberation Army Air Force plane over Maguan in Yunnan province; a spokesman called it an "act of war provocation". Hours later, the United States denied the story, but said that one of its F-4C Phantom jets had downed a MiG-17 in North Vietnam, about 25 miles (40 km) from the border.
- Born: Darius Rucker, African-American country music singer and former rock music vocalist for Hootie & the Blowfish; in Charleston, South Carolina

== May 14, 1966 (Saturday) ==
- Across the United States, more than 400,000 college students took the draft deferment examination, given at 1,200 colleges and universities, in order to be exempted from being drafted into the United States military during the Vietnam War, while anti-war demonstrations took place outside many of the testing centers. Students were allowed three hours to answer 150 questions in order to see whether they could retain their 2-S draft classification; out of 1.8 million students who were 2-S, one million had registered for the test, which would be repeated on May 21, June 3 and June 24, and the test score and class rank would be evaluated by local draft boards.
- Everton overcame a 2–0 deficit to defeat Sheffield Wednesday, 3–2, to win the 1966 FA Cup Final, in one of the greatest comebacks in English soccer football history, played in front of 100,000 people at Wembley. By the 57th minute, goals by Jim McCalliog and David Ford had given the Owls a large lead. In the next seven minutes, however, Mike Trebilcock scored twice for the Toffees (in the 59 and 64th minute) to even the match and Derek Temple scored the game winner in the 74th minute.
- Turkey and Greece agreed to hold talks concerning a peaceful resolution of the ongoing violence in Cyprus, an island republic inhabited by people of Greek and Turkish descent.
- The 18th BRDC International Trophy motor race was held at the Silverstone Circuit and won by Jack Brabham.
- Born: Raphael Saadiq, American singer, songwriter, multi-instrumentalist, and record producer; as Charles Ray Wiggins in Oakland, California

== May 15, 1966 (Sunday) ==
- In Japan, the comedy and variety show Shōten was telecast for the first time. Fifty years later, the show continues to be watched on the Nippon Television Network. The program itself is based on a Japanese form of storytelling humor called rakugo, and features six performers who are posed questions by a host.
- Over 1,000 troops of the Army of the Republic of Vietnam were airlifted from Saigon into Da Nang to take control of the ongoing Buddhist student rebellion in the South Vietnamese city and recaptured the area after a day-long battle.
- Five thousand anti-war demonstrators picketed the White House, then rallied at the Washington Monument.

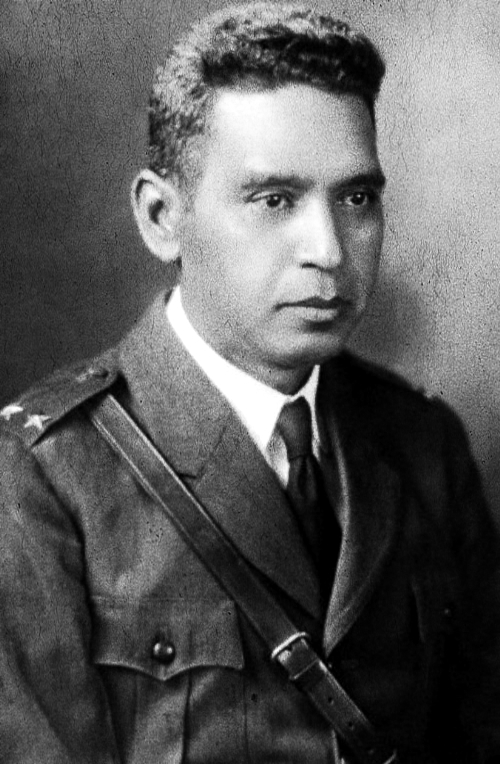
Hernández

- Born: Greg Wise, British actor, in Newcastle-upon-Tyne
- Died: Maximiliano Hernández Martínez, 83, former military dictator of El Salvador, was stabbed to death by his chauffeur, Jose Cipriano Morales, in the Jamastran valley of Honduras, where he had been living in exile. Cipriano's father had been one of the 30,000 people murdered by the dictator's "White Guards" between 1931 and 1944.

== May 16, 1966 (Monday) ==
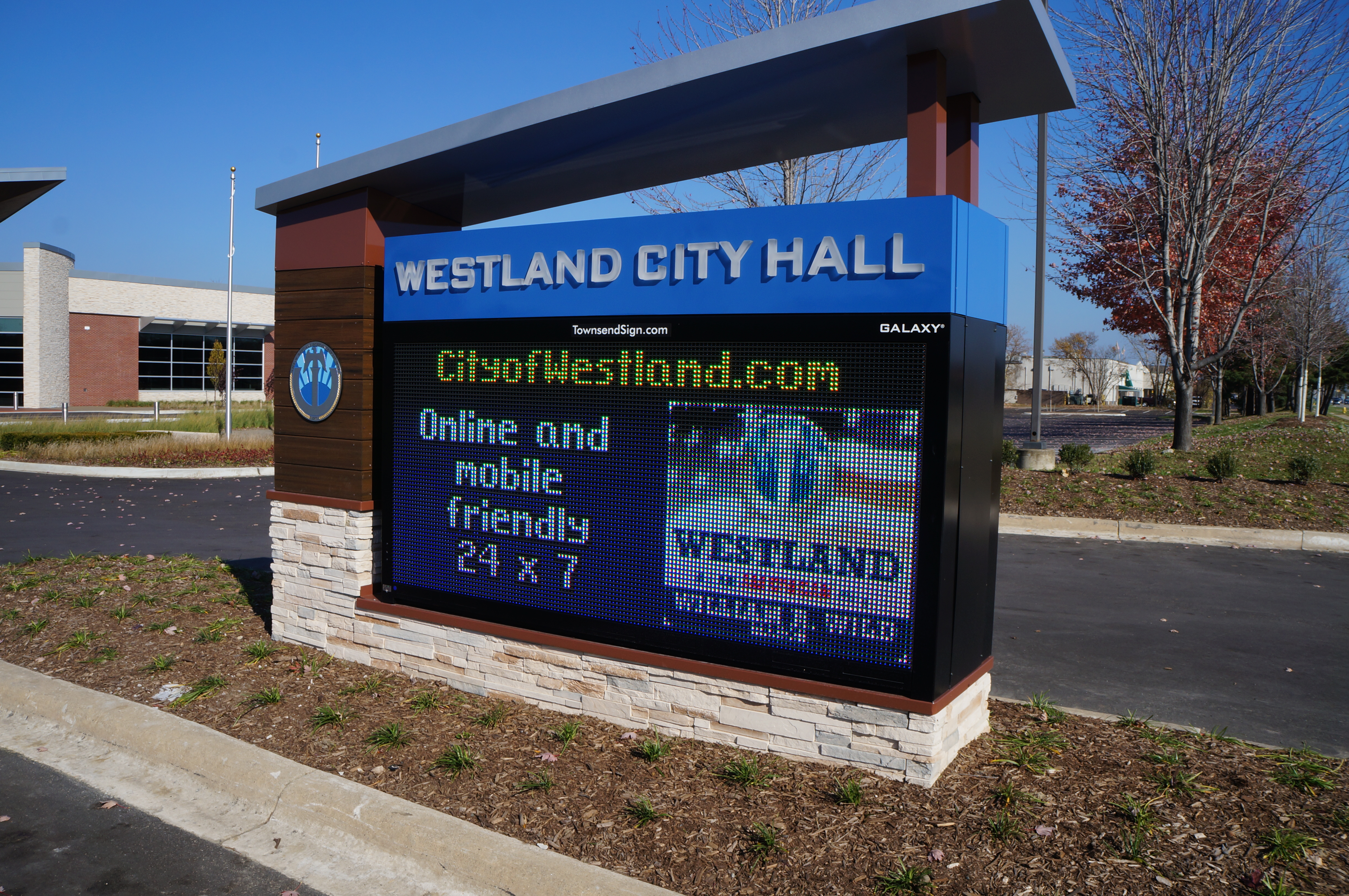
Westland

- The city of Westland, Michigan, was created near Detroit, representing the last area of the original Nankin Township whose sections had been incorporated as the villages (and later, villages) of Wayne (1869), Garden City (1927), and Inkster (1927). In a reversal of the usual sequence of naming places, the new city was named after the local shopping center, the Westland Mall.
- The "Circular of the Central Committee of the Communist Party of China on the Great Proletarian Cultural Revolution", unofficially known as the "May 16 Directive", was approved by the CCP Politburo, and began a period on nationwide upheaval in the world's most populous nation. The document, reviewed and edited by Party Chairman Mao Zedong, declared a nationwide campaign against "those representatives of the bourgeoisie who have sneaked into the Party, the government, the army, and various cultural circles", describing such persons as "counterrevolutionary revisionists" whose aim was to "seize political power and turn the dictatorship of the proletariat into a dictatorship of the bourgeoisie".
- A moment after midnight, Britain's merchant marines went on a nationwide strike for the first time since 1911, as 62,500 members of the National Union of Seamen demanded a 40-hour work week and higher wages. At the time, Britain's seamen were "among the world's worst paid" according to the NUS, with a base pay of £27 (equivalent at the time to $39.20) for a 56-hour work week. As workers docked and left their ships, British ports were tied up with as many as 400 vessels and, a commentator noted, the walkout "could achieve what German submarines failed to accomplish in two world wars" and idle the Royal Navy. The strike would continue for two months, ending on July 16.
- At least 175 people died when the ferry MV Pioneer Cebu capsized in the Philippines off Cebu Island, after the ship was caught by the winds of Typhoon Irma. Of the 262 people known to have been on board, 130 were saved by a passing motor vessel, the Diana, and taken to Bantayan Island.
- In New York City, Dr. Martin Luther King Jr. made his first public speech on the Vietnam War.
- The legendary album Pet Sounds by The Beach Boys was released.
- Born:
  - Thurman Thomas, American NFL running back and member of Pro Football Hall of Fame; in Houston
  - Janet Jackson, American singer, actress and dancer; in Gary, Indiana

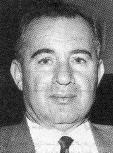
Mrowa

- Died:
  - Kamel Mrowa, 52, publisher of the Lebanon conservative newspaper Al-Hayat. Mrowa, who frequently criticized Egypt's President Nasser and other Arab leaders, was shot to death in his office.
  - Tu'i Malila, 188, a tortoise that Captain Cook had given to the Tongan royal family in 1777.

== May 17, 1966 (Tuesday) ==
- Gemini 9 was awaiting launch with astronauts Thomas P. Stafford and Eugene A. Cernan aboard, when the failure of another rocket, carrying the Agena target with which they were to dock, defeated the purpose of the mission. The $145,000,000 Gemini Agena target vehicle 5004 was on its way toward an orbit 185 miles (298 km) above the Earth. Launch and flight were normal until about 120 seconds after liftoff, 10 seconds before booster engine cutoff. At that point, booster engine No. 2 on Atlas target launch vehicle 5303 swiveled and went "under sustained thrust, but at a down angle", according to the NASA statement. The Agena fell into the Atlantic Ocean some 90 miles (140 km) off the Florida coast about seven and one-half minutes after launch. Subsequent investigation indicated that the failure had been caused by a short in the servo control circuit.
- At midnight, 7,500,000 government employees and private workers in France began a 24-hour strike in protest of the strict wage policies of President Charles de Gaulle. Newspapers did not publish, the state-operated radio and television networks went off the air, telephones ceased to operate, subway trains and buses did not run, garbage went uncollected, and electricity and natural gas were in short supply. Closed also were taxis, barber shops, bakeries, laundries and thousands of factories, and those restaurants that remained open "served only cold meals or just one hot dish" because of a shortage of power.
- Bob Dylan and the Hawks (later The Band) performed at the Free Trade Hall in Manchester. Dylan was booed by the audience because of his decision to tour with an electric band, the boos culminating in the famous "Judas" shout. Three years earlier, in his protest song "With God on Our Side", Dylan had sung "Through many a dark hour/I’ve been thinking about this/That Jesus Christ/Was betrayed by a kiss/But I can’t think for you/You’ll have to decide/Whether Judas Iscariot/Had God on his side".
- Mafia chief Joseph Bonanno, nicknamed "Joe Bananas", surrendered to federal agents in New York City after being gone for 19 months. Bonanno had vanished on October 21, 1964, the day before he was scheduled to appear before a federal grand jury.
- Recycling operations began immediately after the cancellation of the Gemini 9 mission. The mission was redesignated Gemini 9A.
- Born: Qusay Hussein, designated successor to his father, Iraqi President Saddam Hussein and the second most powerful man in Iraq at the time of his death. Qusay would be killed in a gun battle with U.S. forces during a raid in 2003; in Baghdad

== May 18, 1966 (Wednesday) ==
- The Parliament of Canada came under a terrorist attack for the first time in the nation's 99-year history, when a bomb exploded in a restroom a few doors away from the office of Prime Minister Pearson in the Centre Block of the Parliament Buildings. One person, 45-year-old Joseph Chartier, was killed in the explosion. At the time, Pearson was attending the ongoing session of the House of Commons. Afterward, police determined that Chartier himself was the perpetrator. Chartier left behind a notebook at his apartment, saying that his intention was "to drop a bomb and kill as many as possible for the rotten way you are running this country" and added, "Mr. Speaker, gentlemen: I might as well give you a blast to wake you up. For one whole year. I have thought of nothing but how to exterminate as many of you as possible." Other Chartier writings showed that he had calculated that he would have two and a half minutes to light the dynamite fuse, walk from the men's room to the Commons chambers, and throw in his bomb; but that he had misjudged the amount of time.
- NASA Associate Administrator for Manned Space Flight George E. Mueller held a major technical planning session on the AAP with principal NASA Headquarters AAP officials and representatives of the three crewed spacecraft Centers. Programmatic and design decisions included the concept of a "dependent" spent-stage experiment support module (SSESM) and S-IVB Workshop (i.e., fuel cells in the CSM would support the entire vehicle); a process by which expendables in the SSESM would be fed to the CSM via external umbilicals; and development of extended-duration fuel cell assemblies for long-duration synchronous and lunar orbit AAP missions. Also, Mueller reaffirmed an early 1968 schedule for availability of the first SSESM.
- Mame, a musical based on the 1955 novel Auntie Mame, opened on Broadway and began a run of 1,508 performances over the next three and a half years. With music and lyrics by Jerry Herman, Mame starred Angela Lansbury in the title role, and Bea Arthur portrayed Vera Charles, a role for which Arthur would win a Tony Award. The musical would close on January 3, 1970.
- NASA decided to launch the augmented target docking adapter (ATDA) because of the failure on the previous day of Atlas target launch vehicle (TLV) 5303 and the loss of Gemini Agena target vehicle 5004. TLV-5304 was removed from storage and began modification to serve as the launch vehicle for the ATDA.
- The 1966 Giro d'Italia bicycle race began in Monte Carlo. Italian cyclist Gianni Motta would win the 3,976-kilometre (2,471 mi) race to Trieste on June 8.
- The 1966 European Judo Championships were held in Luxembourg.

== May 19, 1966 (Thursday) ==
- The XB-70 Valkyrie strategic bomber became the first vehicle to hold a sustained speed (more than half an hour) in excess of Mach 3. Literally moving faster than a speeding bullet, at three times the speed of sound, the six-engine jet aircraft was flown at its "triplesonic" speed of more than 2,000 miles per hour (3,200 km/h) for 32 minutes by test pilot Al White of North American Aviation, and his co-pilot, USAF Colonel Joe Cotton. Friction from the air heated the outside of the aircraft to 620 °F (327 °C). As the plane returned to Edwards Air Force Base in California, the two pilots discovered that the landing gear would not lower because of a short circuit; Colonel Cotton reportedly "used a paper clip to short circuit an electrical terminal" to lower the gear, sparing the crew from having "to bail out and abandon the $500 million craft".
- The Dissolution Honours List, issued by the outgoing UK government, included 12 new life peers.
- Leroy Grumman retired as chairman of Grumman Aeronautical Engineering Co.
- Died:
  - Theodore F. Green, 98, U.S. Senator for Rhode Island from 1937 to 1961; he was known as "The Grand Old Man of the Senate" because he was 69 when he took office and served until age 93. At the time, Green was the oldest person to have served in the U.S. Senate, a record later broken by Strom Thurmond, who was 100 when his term as U.S. Senator from South Carolina expired in 2003.
  - Alirio Ugarte Pelayo, 43, Venezuelan politician who was preparing to form his own political party as a presidential candidate. Ugarte, who had been suspended from the URD after being the front-runner for their nomination, invited reporters to his home for a press conference, but when the journalists arrived, they found him dead of a self-inflicted gunshot wound.

== May 20, 1966 (Friday) ==
- The Kingdom of Buganda had existed as an autonomous traditional monarchy within the Republic of Uganda, and was governed by former Ugandan President Edward Mutesa, under the regnal name King Mutesa II, along with a parliament of chiefs, the Lukiiko, in the capital at Mengo. The Lukiiko passed a resolution to declare the Ugandan central government to be an illegal occupier, and demanded that it remove itself from Bugandan soil without taking into account that the little kingdom had no military power to enforce the resolution and, in the process, gave Ugandan President Milton Obote a reason for military intervention a few days later.
- On May 20 and 21, representatives of the Air Force and NASA met at Brooks AFB, Texas, to exchange information on medical experiments planned for the Air Force's Manned Orbiting Laboratory (MOL) project and NASA's AAP. Stanley White, who headed the USAF group of aerospace medical experts, expressed strong interest in exploiting NASA's AAP project to study the effects of long-duration spaceflight on human life processes. White stated the Air Force's desire that MOL thus be relieved of this experiment burden so program planners could direct the program more closely toward evaluating human utility for military space operations.
- Zal Yanovsky and Steve Boone of the American folk-rock band the Lovin' Spoonful were arrested in San Francisco for possessing marijuana, marking the first time members of a popular music act were busted for possessing illegal drugs.
- Generalissimo Chiang Kai-shek was sworn in for his fourth term as President of the Republic of China after having been forced to flee to Taiwan from mainland China during his first term.
- The 1966 Cannes Film Festival concluded with Faraon, directed by Jerzy Kawalerowicz.
- Born:
  - Mindy Cohn, American child actress best known as "Natalie" on the television show The Facts of Life; in Los Angeles
  - Joey Gamache, American professional boxer and former world lightweight champion; in Lewiston, Maine

== May 21, 1966 (Saturday) ==
- A sentry for the Army of Cuba was shot and killed by a U.S. Marine guard firing from the Guantanamo Bay Naval Base. Cuban radio identified the dead man as Luis Ramirez Lopez. The U.S. Department of Defense acknowledged the shooting three days later, and said that the Marine guard had told investigators that the Cuban sentry had been an intruder inside the base's fence, and had ignored a warning shot. The Marine, not identified, told his superiors that he had fired again and thought he had wounded the sentry, who, despite being wounded, "was able to surmount the fence and leave the area".
- In Northern Ireland, the Protestant Ulster Volunteer Force issued its "declaration of war" against the Roman Catholic Irish Republican Army, a statement that appeared in Belfast newspapers. "From this day we declare war against the IRA", UVF Chief of Staff William Johnston wrote. "Known IRA men will be executed mercilessly and without hesitation. We will not tolerate any interference from any source and we solemnly warn the authorities to make no more speeches of appeasement."
- The Broadway production of The Subject Was Roses, starring Jack Albertson, Irene Dailey and Martin Sheen, closed after 832 performances, two Tony Awards and one Pulitzer Prize. Albertson and Sheen would reprise their roles for the 1968 film adaptation, for which Albertson would win an Oscar for Best Supporting Actor.
- Died: Pat O'Malley, 75, American film actor

== May 22, 1966 (Sunday) ==
- The 271st and final episode of the television legal drama Perry Mason was shown on CBS, bringing an end to a nine-season run that featured Raymond Burr in the title role. The Case of the Final Fade-Out included an uncredited appearance by Erle Stanley Gardner, the author who created the Perry Mason series of books, as a judge presiding over Mason's final murder defense. Members of the production crew appeared in cameo roles portraying the production crew for a fictitious TV series.
- At the Tūrangawaewae marae in Ngāruawāhia, New Zealand, Princess Piki Mahuta was crowned as Te Atairangikaahu, the first Māori Queen, and the sixth traditional Maori monarch overall in a line of secession that began in 1857.
- The 1966 Formula One season opened with the Monaco Grand Prix, which was won by Jackie Stewart.
- Died: Tom Goddard, 65, English cricketer, fifth-highest first-class wicket taker

== May 23, 1966 (Monday) ==
- Justice Hugo Black delivered the opinion of the U.S. Supreme Court in Mills v. Alabama, striking down, as unconstitutional, an Alabama court ruling that had held that the printing of a newspaper editorial on an election day could be punishable as a crime. The case arose from the arrest of James E. Mills, the editor of the Birmingham Post-Herald, on November 6, 1962, for urging Post-Herald readers to vote in favor of a measure to reorganize the city government. Black noted that such an interpretation "muzzles one of the very agencies the framers of our Constitution thoughtfully and deliberately selected to improve our society and keep it free."
- The conflict between Cuba and the United States naval base at Guantánamo Province escalated as six Cuban soldiers and an unreported number of U.S. Marines exchanged gunfire at the Guantanamo Bay Naval Base. According to the U.S., the Cuban soldiers had slipped through the boundary fence and onto the base, and then opened fire. Nobody on either side was wounded.
- Born:
  - H. Jon Benjamin, American actor and comedian; in Worcester, Massachusetts
  - Graeme Hick, Rhodesia-born England cricketer; in Salisbury (now Harare)
- Died: Prince Demchugdongrub, 64, Mongol Chinese politician and puppet ruler who had been chairman of the Mongolian military government that led Inner Mongolia in a secession from China in 1938 during the invasion by Japan, and later was the ruler of the Japanese-sponsored Kingdom of Mengjiang from 1939 to 1945, when Inner Mongolia was reincorporated into China.

== May 24, 1966 (Tuesday) ==
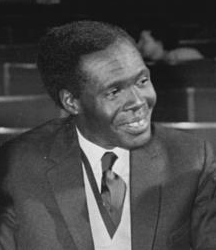
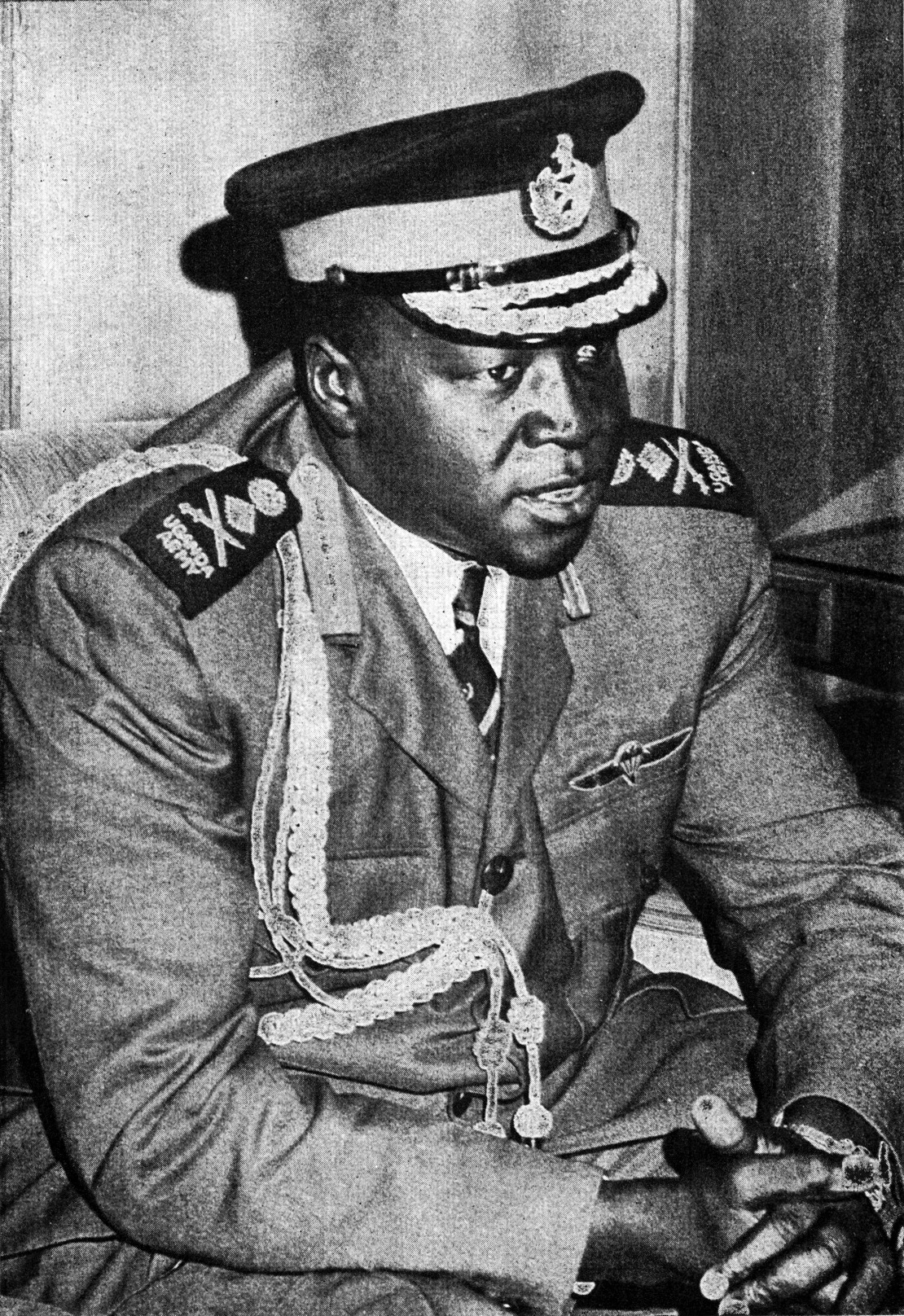
May 24, 1966: President Obote orders General Idi Amin to attack the Kabaka of Buganda
- On orders of Uganda's President Obote, troops led by Colonel Idi Amin Dada invaded the Bugandan capital of Mengo to attack the Lubiri, palace of the King Mutesa II, the Kabaka (paramount chief) of the rebellious traditional kingdom. Outnumbered, the 120 royal bodyguards defended the palace for twelve hours while Mutesa II escaped. Amin then carried out the elimination of "all living creatures that did not leave the palace in time", whether elderly or young, and the destruction of the traditional relics— "drums, spears, crowns, insignia, stools, and so on". Mutesa, who had sneaked out during a rainstorm, was sheltered by two families, then spirited out of the country to neighboring Burundi. He eventually settled in the United Kingdom. Colonel Amin would stage a military coup in 1971, deposing Obote to become the new president.

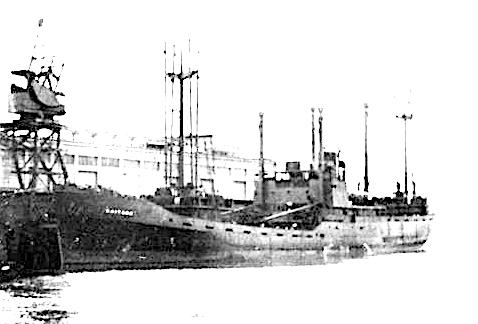
MV Kaitawa

- The entire 29-man crew of the New Zealand collier MV Kaitawa drowned after the ship foundered in a storm, 10 nautical miles (19 km) off Cape Reinga. Wreckage washed ashore the following day, including the remains of a lifeboat, and life jackets that the crew was not able to don in time. It was the worst sea disaster in New Zealand in almost 60 years, since the passenger ferry SS Penguin ran aground near Wellington on February 12, 1909.
- Nigeria's President Johnson Aguiyi-Ironsi issued "Decree Number 34", abolishing the system of prior system of autonomous Northern, Eastern and Western Regions that composed the Federal Republic of Nigeria and declaring a unified government. "Nigeria ceases to be what has been described as a federation", General Ironsi said in a radio broadcast. "It now becomes simply the Republic of Nigeria." The decree would prove to be his undoing, and Ironsi would be overthrown two months later.
- Errol Noack, a 21-year-old Australian Army Private, became the first Australian National Service draftee to be killed in the Vietnam War, only ten days after he had arrived, and would become a symbol for the Australian anti-war movement. Private Noack was the victim of friendly fire, shot by members of another platoon of the 5th Battalion after being mistaken for an enemy combatant.

== May 25, 1966 (Wednesday) ==
- Along with six of her colleagues from the Department of Philosophy at Beijing University, Professor Nie Yuanzi entered the university's dining hall at 2:00 p.m. and placed the first of the "big-character posters" (ta tzu pao or dazibao) on the wall, unleashing what would be a wave of similarly styled criticisms by Chinese students. In large Chinese characters, the first of the posters was headlined "What the Peking University Committee Is Doing in the Cultural Revolution". Within the text, she accused Vice-Chancellor Lu P'ing and the Committee of undermining the Revolution by suppressing the student movement toward reform. Universities tried to suppress big-character posters in general, but on June 1, Chairman Mao would endorse the campaign, directing the youths of China to expose anyone believed to be a "counter-revolutionary".
- Five years after President John F. Kennedy's call for a commitment of "landing a man on the Moon and returning him safely to the earth", NASA unveiled the prototype of the machine that would take astronauts there. At 363 feet (111 m) tall (equivalent to a 30-story building) the Saturn V rocket was larger than any predecessor, and three times as powerful as the Titan II GLV rocket used in the Gemini program.
- The Soviet government delivered a diplomatic note to Israel's embassy in Moscow, with a warning that the Soviets were aware of Israel's massing of forces along its northern borders. The note included the warning that "we hope that the Israeli government would not allow external forces to determine the fate of its people and country."
- Died: Lieutenant General Vernon Sturdee, 76, Chief of Staff of the Australian Army during World War II

== May 26, 1966 (Thursday) ==
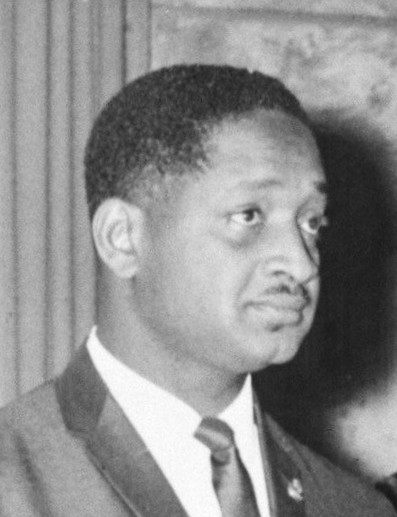
Forbes Burnham

- At midnight, the colony of British Guiana was granted independence as the nation of Guyana, with Forbes Burnham as its first Prime Minister. Prince Edward, Duke of Kent, and the Duchess of Kent appeared on behalf of Queen Elizabeth.
- In the annual U.S. presidential proclamation of the last Monday in May as Memorial Day, President Johnson pledged that the United States would not pull out of the Vietnam War until victory had been achieved. "This nation has never left the field of battle in abject surrender of a cause for which it has fought", Johnson wrote. "We shall not do so now. We shall see this through."
- On the same day, the United States military command announced that the number of American casualties in Vietnam in the week of May 15–21 marked the highest up to that time in the war, with 146 Americans killed and 820 wounded. The 966 casualties was 36% higher than the previous record of 710 in the week of November 14–20, 1965, when 86 were killed and 565 wounded.
- A new Learjet 24 completed a round-the-world flight, landing at the Lear Jet company airfield near Wichita, Kansas at 11:31 a.m., 66 hours and 19 minutes after its departure from Wichita almost three days earlier. The flight was a promotion "to demonstrate the versatility of the plane for world-wide business use".
- Born:
  - Zola Budd, South African runner and one-time women's 5,000 meter world record holder; in Bloemfontein
  - Helena Bonham Carter, English film actress; in Hampstead
- Died: Don Castle, 47, American film actor and television producer, died from an accidental overdose of pain medication.

== May 27, 1966 (Friday) ==
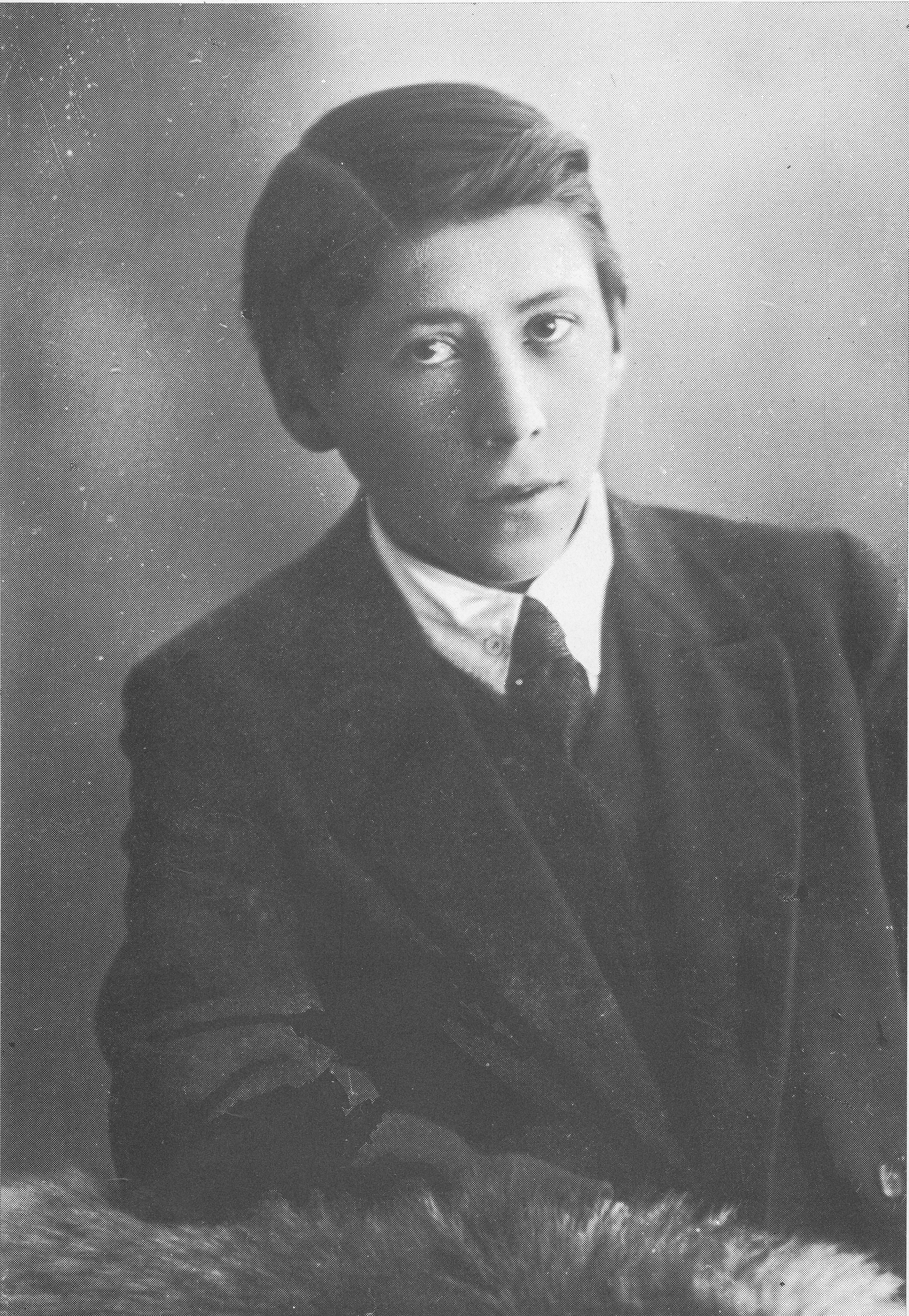
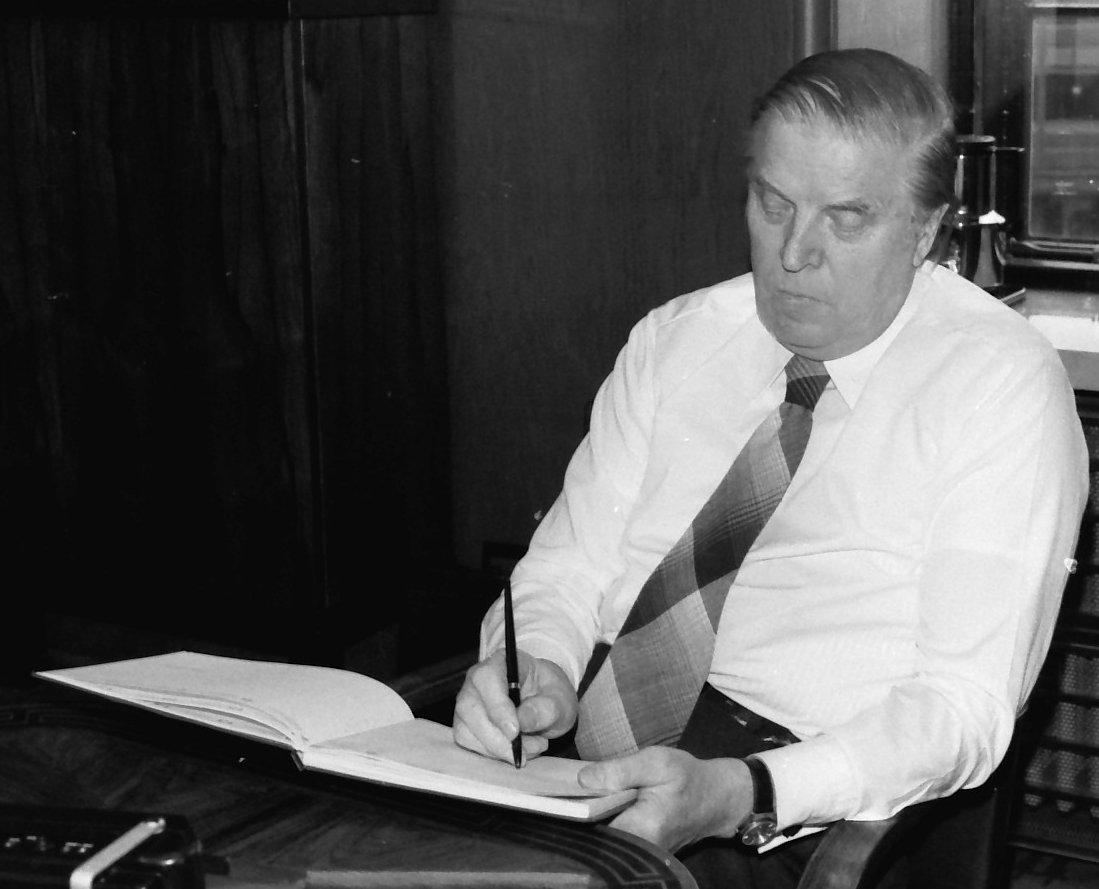
Finland's Prime Ministers Paasio and Virolainen
- Rafael Paasio replaced Johannes Virolainen as Prime Minister of Finland and, for the first time since 1948, included members of Finland's Communist Party in the government. The Communist government ministers had been invited to join in order for the coalition government to win two-thirds majority approval by the 200-seat Finnish Parliament, where Paasio's Social Democratic party had a plurality with only 55 seats, compared to the Centrists' 49 and the Communists' 26.
- After getting lost during a training mission and running out of fuel, French Air Force pilots safely ejected from, and allowed to crash, six Mystère IV jet fighters, worth $600,000 apiece. At the time, the squadron of planes was only ten minutes away from either the Naval Station at Rota or the Morón Air Base, both operated jointly by Spain and the United States. The six planes crashed in the sparsely populated countryside in western Spain near the frontier with Portugal.
- Born:
  - Titi DJ (stage name for Titi Dwijayati), Indonesian pop singer; in Jakarta
  - Heston Blumenthal, English celebrity chef; in Shepherd's Bush

== May 28, 1966 (Saturday) ==
- Cuba's Prime Minister Fidel Castro ordered a state of alert for the Cuban armed forces, and told citizens in a nationwide television and radio address to be prepared for an attack from the United States. Castro said that statements by U.S. Secretary of State Dean Rusk had "practically threatened Cuba with war". The next day, tens of thousands of military reservists were recalled for active duty.
- The boat ride "It's a Small World" opened in Disneyland after the closing of the New York World's Fair in 1965.

== May 29, 1966 (Sunday) ==
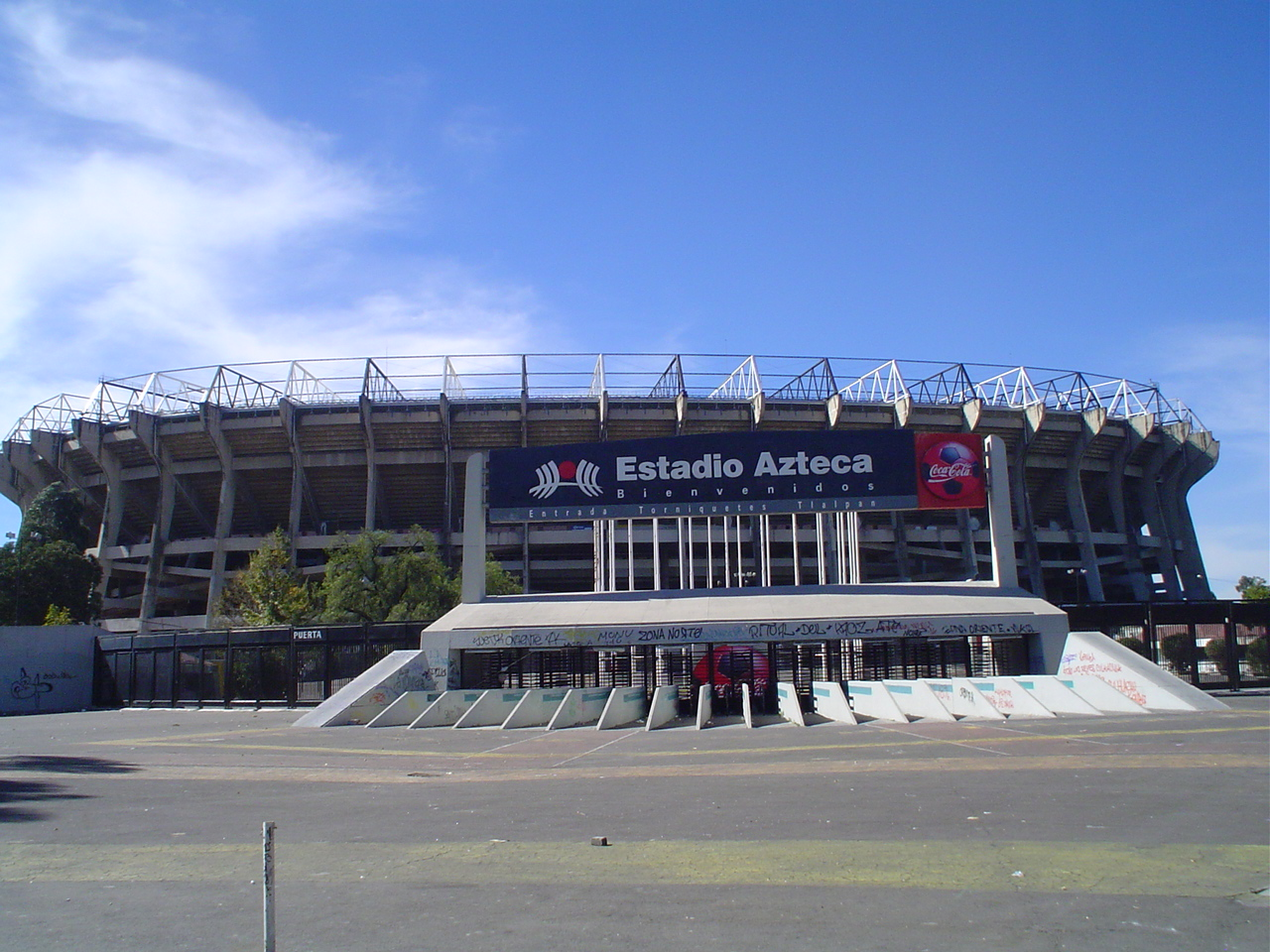
Estadio Azteca

- The 105,000-seat Estadio Azteca football ground in Mexico City hosted its inaugural match, between Club América and Torino F.C. Mexican president Gustavo Díaz Ordaz made the initial kick and FIFA president Sir Stanley Rous was the witness. The game ended in a 2–2 draw.
- A group of 40 high school age students at the Middle School of Qinghua University formed a new group to resist the school's principal, Wang Pangyu, and began using the name Red Guards (hongweibing) to describe itself, taking a vow that they would guard China against the people whom Chairman Mao described as those who "conspired to change the color of Communist China."
- Foreign Minister Adam Malik of Indonesia and Deputy Prime Minister Tun Abdul Razak of Malaysia met at the home of Thai Foreign Minister Thanat Khoman, and told reporters afterward that the Indonesian Confrontation was over after three years. A treaty would be signed on August 11.

== May 30, 1966 (Monday) ==
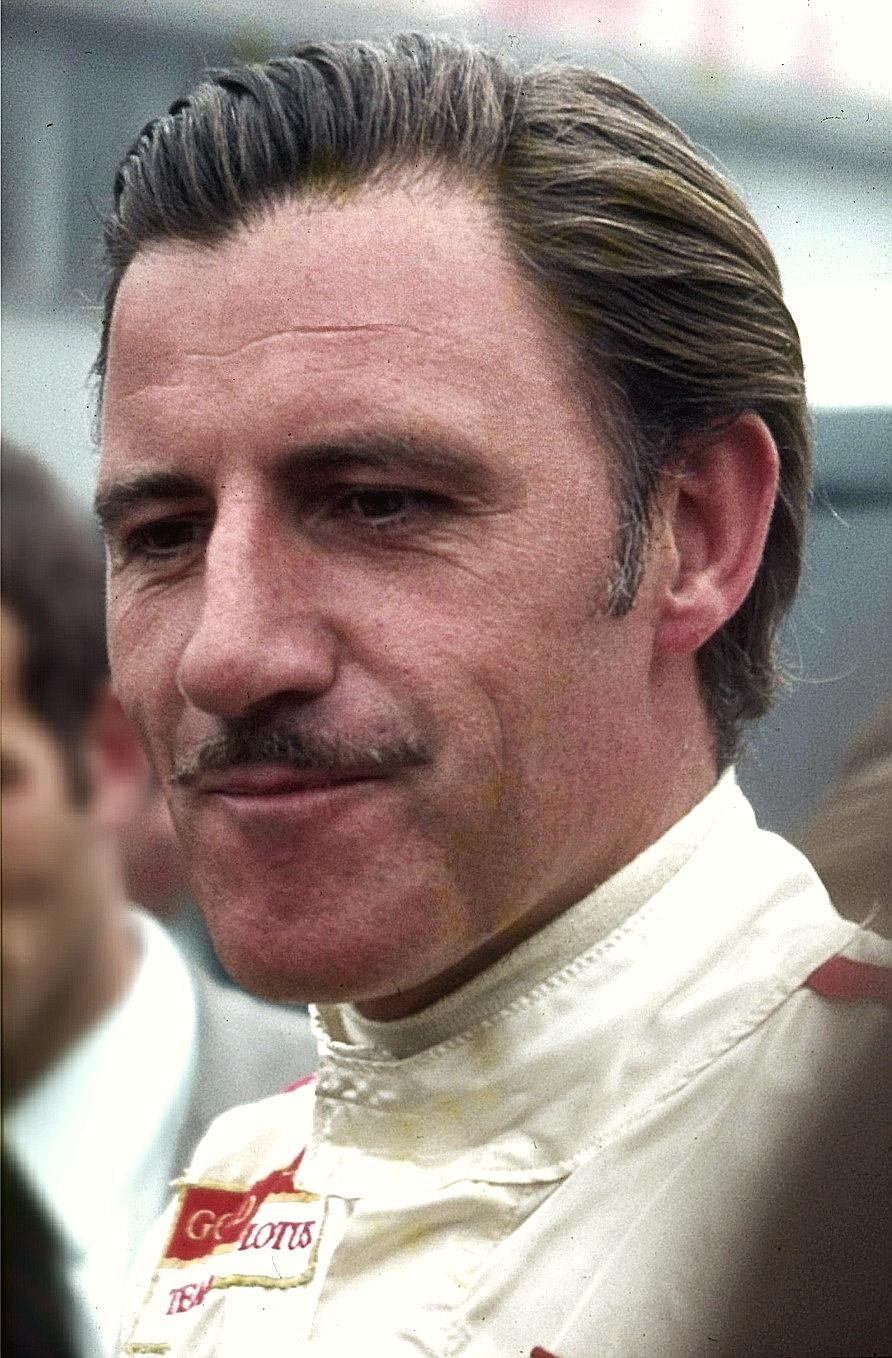
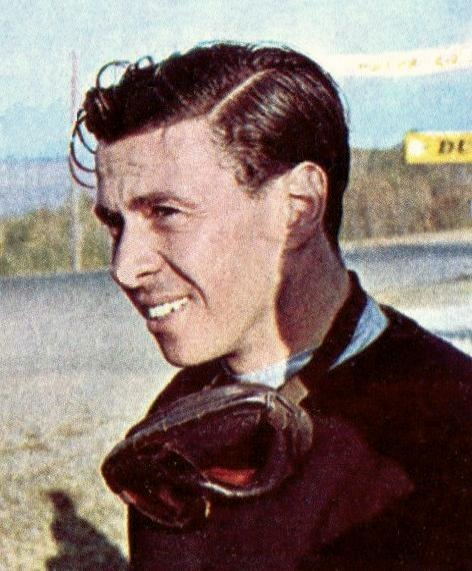
England's Hill and Scotland's Clark
- English driver Graham Hill won the 50th Indianapolis 500, ahead of Scotland's Jim Clark, whose team protested that Hill had actually been one lap behind Clark when the checkered flag was waved to end the race. Only seven of the 33 cars, the lowest number ever, actually finished the race. Before even reaching the first turn, 11 of the cars had been eliminated in a 16-car pileup, delaying the race for nearly an hour and a half. Another Scotsman, Jackie Stewart, had been leading the race with only ten laps left, but his engine failed. The next day, Clark's crew reviewed the official racing charts and determined that they (and the operators of the official scoreboard) had overlooked Hill passing by while Clark was at a pit stop. The scorers had corrected the error later in the race and added a lap for Hill on the scoreboard.
- Surveyor 1, the first American lunar exploration probe, was launched from Cape Kennedy toward a soft landing at the Oceanus Procellarum, the Moon's "Ocean of Storms", and would confirm Soviet discoveries about the suitability of the lunar surface for a crewed landing. On the same day, the Soviet Union lost radio contact with Luna 10, which on April 3 had become the first space probe to orbit the Moon.
- Died:
  - Alexander MacDonald Shook, 77, Canadian flying ace with 12 kills during World War I
  - Bob Thompson, 48, African-American abstract expressionist painter
  - Michael Lvovitch Tsetlin, 42, Soviet mathematician
  - Wäinö Aaltonen, 72, Finnish artist and sculptor

== May 31, 1966 (Tuesday) ==
- Only a few years after most Negroes had effectively been barred, by state voter registration laws, from voting in Alabama, former postal worker Lucius Amerson became the first African-American to win a Democratic Party nomination for a major office in that state, defeating incumbent Macon County Sheriff Harvey Sadler in the primary. In the general election, Amerson would defeat two white opponents who had run against him in the May primary, to become "the only member of his race to hold the office in the South" and the first black sheriff since the Reconstruction Era.
- One day after their arrest on charges of conspiring to assassinate President Joseph Mobutu, a military tribunal in the former Belgian Congo tried and convicted former Congolese Prime Minister Évariste Kimba and three other former cabinet ministers, and sentenced them to be hanged in public. After a 90-minute proceeding, Prime Minister Kimba, Defense Minister Jeromy Anany, Finance Minister Emmanuel Bamba, and Alexandre Mahamba, were found guilty, and all four were hanged in front of 80,000 spectators two days later.
