= Third Party for America =

- Founder: Juan Elgin
- Founded: 1965
- Dissolved: 1968

The Third Party for America, officially the Southern National Third Party for America, was an American political party that was founded in 1965 by former Republican Party member Juan Elgin. The party was founded as the Third Party of America, but the name was later changed.

== History ==
Juan Elgin was a former member of the Alabama Republican Party State Executive Committee, and founded the party in 1965. In the announcement of the party's formation, he criticized the United States involvement in the Vietnam War. He praised then-Governor of Alabama George Wallace, and criticized the boycott of products made in Alabama that was launched by Martin Luther King Jr. He attempted to block Republican candidates from appearing on the ballot in 1966, as they were not selected through a primary. That year, he pledged to support Wallace for president in 1968.

The party fielded its first candidates in the 1966 election, in one statewide race and various local races, including the 1966 Macon County, Alabama Sheriff election. Elgin qualified for the ballot in the 1966 United States Senate election in Alabama, as the first statewide candidate for the party. The party appeared in the third column of the ballot, as parties were sorted alphabetically by law.

In 1967, the party ran a candidate for public works commissioner in Montgomery twice, in both a special and general election.

The party was considered inactive in 1968 and did not return. (Note: The Huntsville Times reported in 1970 that the party had fielded candidates in the 1968 election, but there are no sources covering any candidates from 1968.)
