= John Grenier =

American politician (1930–2007)

Chair of the Alabama Republican Party
- In office 1962–1964
- Preceded by: Claude O. Vardaman
- Succeeded by: Thomas H. Bingham

Personal details
- Born: August 24, 1930 New Orleans, Louisiana, U.S.
- Died: November 6, 2007 (aged 77) Houston, Texas, U.S.
- Party: Republican

John Edward Grenier (August 24, 1930 – November 6, 2007) was a figure in the 1964 presidential campaign of Barry Goldwater. Grenier is one of the figures credited with using the Southern Strategy in that campaign and one of the figures responsible for the rise of the Republican Party in Alabama.

Grenier ran for the United States Senate in 1966 against John Sparkman. Grenier won 39 percent of the vote, the highest percentage that anybody had won against Sparkman in Sparkman's Senate career.

Grenier was also involved in the campaign of Alabama Republican Guy Hunt and the controversies which followed Hunt during his term in office.

For many years, Grenier also worked as a litigator for Lange Simpson Robinson and Somerville, one of the oldest and most distinguished law firms in Birmingham, Alabama.

Grenier died of lung cancer on November 6, 2007, in a hospital in Houston, Texas aged 77.

Party political offices
Preceded by Julian E. Elgin	Republican nominee for U.S. Senator from Alabama (Class 2); 1966	Vacant Title next held by Winton M. Blount
