= 1966 Macon County, Alabama, Sheriff election =

Local election

- November 8, 1966
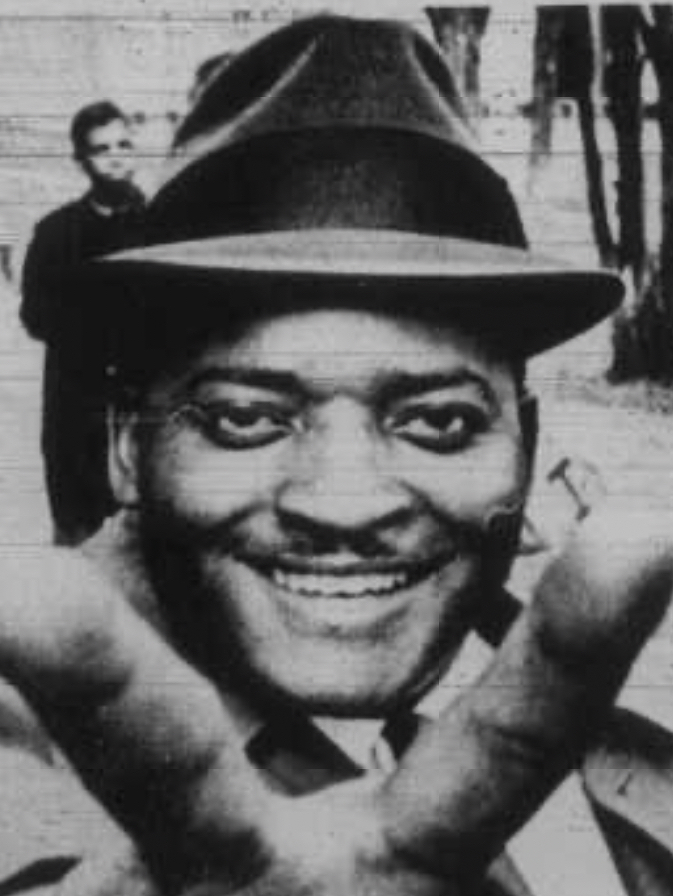

Candidate	Lucius D. Amerson	Harvey Sadler (write-in)
Party	Democratic	Democratic
Popular vote	3,868	2,002
Percentage	64.3%	33.3%
Sheriff before election
Harvey Sadler
Democratic
Elected Sheriff
Lucius D. Amerson
Democratic

The 1966 Macon County sheriff election was held on November 8, 1966, to elect the sheriff of Macon County, Alabama. The primary election was held on May 3, and the primary runoff was held on May 31.

== Background ==
The Voting Rights Act of 1965 was signed into law on August 6, 1965. In 1960, less than 10% of African Americans in Alabama were registered to vote, in part due to various legal measures designed to prevent them from voting, such as poll taxes. The Voting Rights Act meant that this would be the first time that African Americans had legal protections against such restrictions, resulting in a much higher number of African Americans registering to vote in Alabama.

Incumbent Sheriff Harvey Sadler was appointed to the position by Governor George Wallace in January 1965 following the resignation of Preston Hornsby, after he was elected as probate judge. He had served on Wallace's 1962 campaign, the head of the campaign in Macon County.

== Democratic primary ==
=== Candidates ===
==== Nominee ====
- Lucius D. Amerson, former U.S. Army paratrooper

==== Eliminated in runoff ====
- Harvey Sadler, incumbent sheriff

=== Campaign ===
The Macon County Democratic Club endorsed Amerson in April, which was predicted to increase turnout among African American voters.

=== Results ===
Democratic primary
Party	Candidate	Votes	%
Democratic	Lucius D. Amerson	2,725	44.22
Democratic	Harvey Sadler (incumbent)	2,637	42.79
Democratic	Others	800 (Note: Figure may not be exact.)	12.98
Total votes		6,162	100.00

=== Runoff ===
==== Results ====
Democratic primary runoff
Party	Candidate	Votes	%
Democratic	Lucius D. Amerson	3,497	52.90
Democratic	Harvey Sadler (incumbent)	3,113	47.10
Total votes		6,610	100.00

==== Aftermath ====
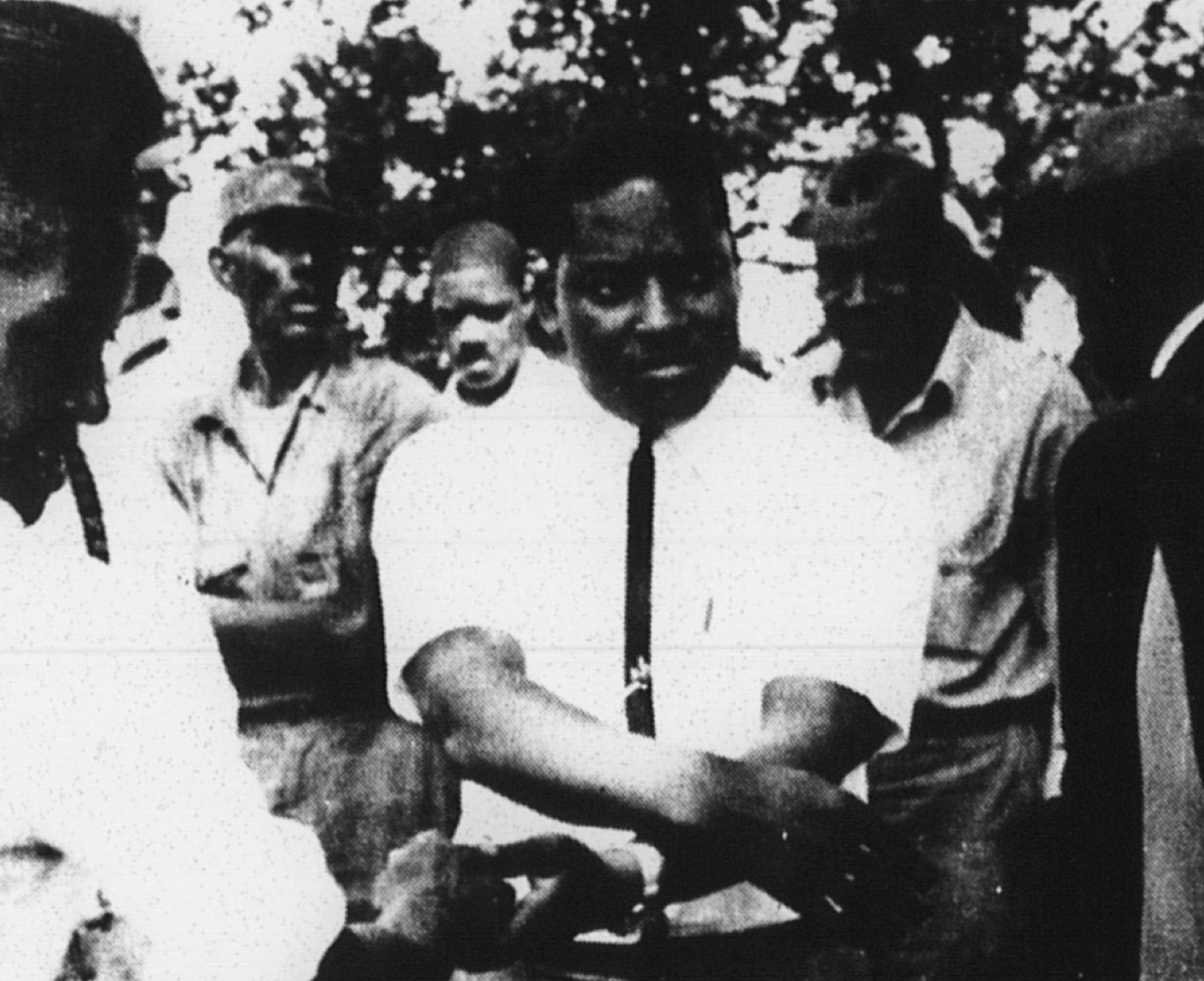
Amerson greeting supporters following his victory in the runoff

At 8:15 PM, Amerson received news of his victory from a campaign staffer. Sadler conceded the election after results came in, stating, "There's no hard feelings between me and him. I wish him luck."

== Third-party candidates ==
=== Third Party for America ===
==== Nominee ====
- Bob Dawson

== General election ==
After losing the Democratic primary, Sadler ran against Amerson in the general election as a write-in candidate.

=== Results ===
On November 9, 1965, United Press International reported a victory for Amerson, showing him leading with 96% of the vote counted.

1966 Macon County sheriff election
Party	Candidate	Votes	%
Democratic	Lucius D. Amerson	3,868	64.26
Democratic	Harvey Sadler (incumbent, write-in)	2,002	33.26
Third Party for America	Bob Dawson	149	2.48
Total votes		6,019	100.00

== Aftermath ==
Amerson became the first Black sheriff in the south since Reconstruction. In the days following the election, he received a congratulatory telegram from Vice President Hubert Humphrey, and was invited to The White House to meet President Lyndon B. Johnson.

Amerson would go on to be re-elected again in 1970, defeating Sadler, who ran as an independent. He was re-elected three more times, serving a total of 20 years, before his retirement in 1987.
