= 1966 United States Senate election in Alabama =

- November 8, 1966
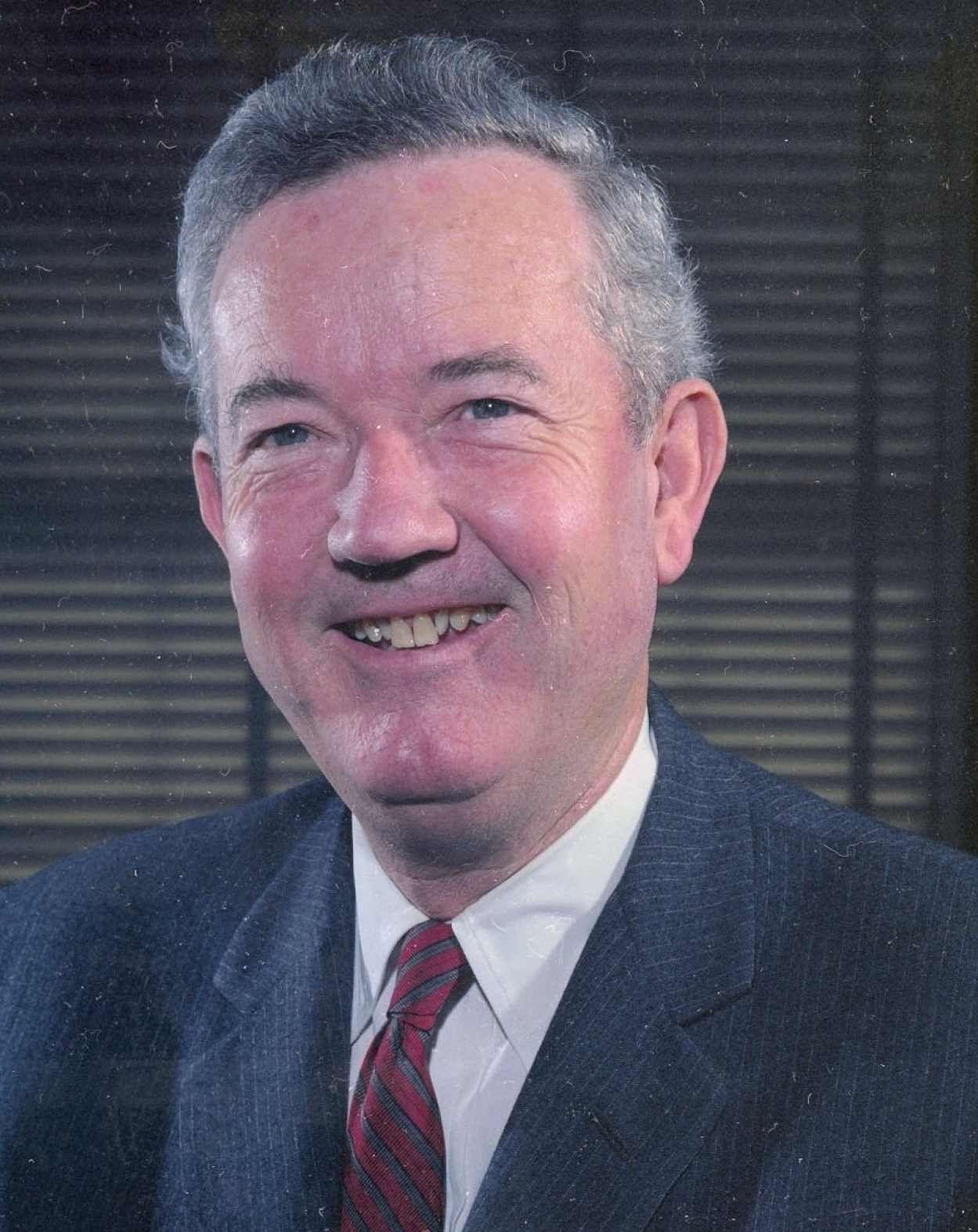

Nominee	John Sparkman	John Grenier
Party	Democratic	Republican
Popular vote	482,138	313,018
Percentage	60.07%	39.00%
- County results Sparkman: 50–60% 60–70% 70–80% Grenier: 60–70%
U.S. senator before election
John Sparkman
Democratic
Elected U.S. Senator
John Sparkman
Democratic

Democratic primary results by county Sparkman: 40–50%; 50–60%; 60–70%; 70–80%; 80–90%; Dixon: 30–40%; 40–50%; 50–60%; Crommelin: 30–40%; 50–60%

The 1966 United States Senate election in Alabama was held on Tuesday November 8, Incumbent United States Senator John Sparkman was re-elected to a fourth full term in office over Republican candidate John Grenier

== Democratic primary ==
=== Candidates ===
- John G. Crommelin, retired U.S. Navy Rear Admiral and white supremacist
- Frank E. Dixon, Huntsville engineer
- John Sparkman, incumbent Senator
- Margaret E. Stewart, genealogist and historian

=== Campaign ===
This was the first Alabama election since Reconstruction to be regulated by federal elections observers, who were sent by the Department of Justice to ensure compliance with the Voting Rights Act.

=== Results ===
1966 Democratic U.S. Senate primary
Party	Candidate	Votes	%
Democratic	John Sparkman (inc.)	378,295	56.98%
Democratic	Frank E. Dixon	133,139	20.05%
Democratic	John G. Crommelin	114,622	17.26%
Democratic	Margaret E. Stewart	37,889	5.71%
Total votes		663,945	100.00%

== Independents and third parties ==
=== Third Party ===
- Julian Elgin, Republican nominee for Senate in 1960

== General election ==
=== Results ===
General election results
Party	Candidate	Votes	%	±%
Democratic	John Sparkman (inc.)	482,138	60.07%	▼10.17
Republican	John Grenier	313,018	39.00%	▲9.24
Third Party for America	Julian Elgin	7,444	0.93%	N/A
Total votes		802,600	100.00%	

== See also ==
- 1966 United States Senate elections
