= 1966 Dissolution Honours =

British government recognitions

The 1966 Dissolution Honours List was issued on 19 May 1966 following the dissolution of the United Kingdom parliament in preparation for a general election.

The recipients of honours are displayed here as they were styled before their new honour.

== Life Peers ==
=== Barons ===
- Rt Hon. Henry Brooke CH, Member of Parliament for West Lewisham, 1938–1945; and for Hampstead, 1950–1966. Financial Secretary, H.M. Treasury, 1954–1957; Minister of Housing and Local Government and Minister for Welsh Affairs, 1957–1961; Chief Secretary, H.M. Treasury, and Paymaster-General 1961–1962; Home Secretary 1962–1964.
- Rt Hon. Sir William Anstruther-Gray Bt MC DL, Member of Parliament for North Lanark, 1931–1945 and for Berwick and East Lothian, 1951–1966. Deputy Chairman of Ways and Means, 1959–1962 and Chairman of Ways and Means and Deputy Speaker, House of Commons, 1962–1964.
- Rt Hon. Arthur Henderson DL QC, Member of Parliament for South Cardiff, 1923–1924 and 1929–1931; and for Kingswinford Division of Staffordshire, 1935–1950; Rowley Regis and Tipton 1950–1966. Financial Secretary, War Office, 1943–1945; Parliamentary Under Secretary of State, India Office and Burma Office, 1945–1947; Minister of State for Commonwealth Relations, 1947; Secretary of State for Air, 1947–1951. Vice-President, Council of Europe Assembly, 1961–1962.
- Rt Hon. Thomas William Jones JP, Member of Parliament for Merioneth, 1951–1966. Welfare Officer and Education Officer for Merseyside and North Wales Electricity Board in North Wales.
- Rt Hon. Walter Monslow, Member of Parliament for Barrow-in-Furness, 1945–1966. Formerly Organising Secretary, Associated Society of Locomotive Engineers and Firemen.
- Rt Hon. Sir George Richard Hodges Nugent Bt, Member of Parliament for Guildford Division of Surrey, 1950–1966. Parliamentary Secretary, Ministry of Agriculture and Fisheries, 1951–1955: to Ministry of Agriculture, Fisheries and Food, 1955–1957: and to Ministry of Transport and Civil Aviation, 1957–1959; Chairman, House of Commons Select Committee on Nationalised Industries, 1961–1964; Chairman, Standing Conference on London Regional Planning since 1962.
- Rt Hon. George Pargiter CBE DL, Member of Parliament for Spelthorne Division of Middlesex, 1945–1950 and for Southall, 1950–1966. Member, Middlesex County Council, 1934–1965: Chairman, 1959–1960. Chairman, Executive of the County Councils Association, 1963.
- Rt Hon. Ernest Popplewell CBE JP, Member of Parliament for Newcastle upon Tyne, West, 1945–1966. Vice-Chamberlain of H.M. Household, 1947–1951; an Opposition Whip, 1951–1955; Opposition Deputy Chief Whip, 1955–1959; Chairman, Select Committee on Nationalised Industries 1964–1966.
- Rt Hon. Sir Martin Redmayne Bt DSO TD, Member of Parliament for Rushcliffe Division of Nottinghamshire, 1950–1966. Government Whip, 1951; A Lord Commissioner, H.M. Treasury, 1953–1959; Deputy Government Chief Whip, 1955–1959; Parliamentary Secretary, H.M. Treasury and Government Chief Whip, 1959–1964.
- Rt Hon. Sir Frank Soskice QC, Member of Parliament for Birkenhead East, 1945–1950: for Neepsend Division of Sheffield, 1950–1955 and for Newport, Monmouthshire, 1956–1966. Solicitor-General, 1945–1951; Attorney-General, 1951; Home Secretary, 1964–1965; Lord Privy Seal, 1965–1966.
- Rt Hon. Sir Samuel Storey Bt, Member of Parliament for Sunderland, 1931–1945 and for Stretford, 1950–1966. Deputy Chairman of Ways and Means, 1964–1965; Chairman of Ways and Means and Deputy Speaker, House of Commons, 1965–1966.
- Rt Hon. Harry Bernard Taylor CBE, Member of Parliament for Mansfield Division of Nottinghamshire, 1941–1966. Parliamentary Secretary, Ministry of National Insurance, 1950–1951.

== Privy Council ==
- Rt Hon. Edward Shackleton, Baron Shackleton OBE, Member of Parliament for Preston, 1946–1950 and for Preston South, 1950–1955. Minister of Defence (Royal Air Force) since 1964.

== Companions of Honour ==
- Lady Megan Lloyd George MP, Member of Parliament for Anglesey, 1929–1951 and for Carmarthen, 1957–1966. For political and public services (posthumously).
- Rt Hon. Jim Griffiths MP, Member of Parliament for Llanelly Division of Carmarthenshire since 1936. Minister of National Insurance, 1945–1950; Secretary of State for the Colonies, 1950–1951; Secretary of State for Wales, 1964–1966. For political and public services.
