= Lucius Amerson =

American sheriff

Lucius Davenport Amerson
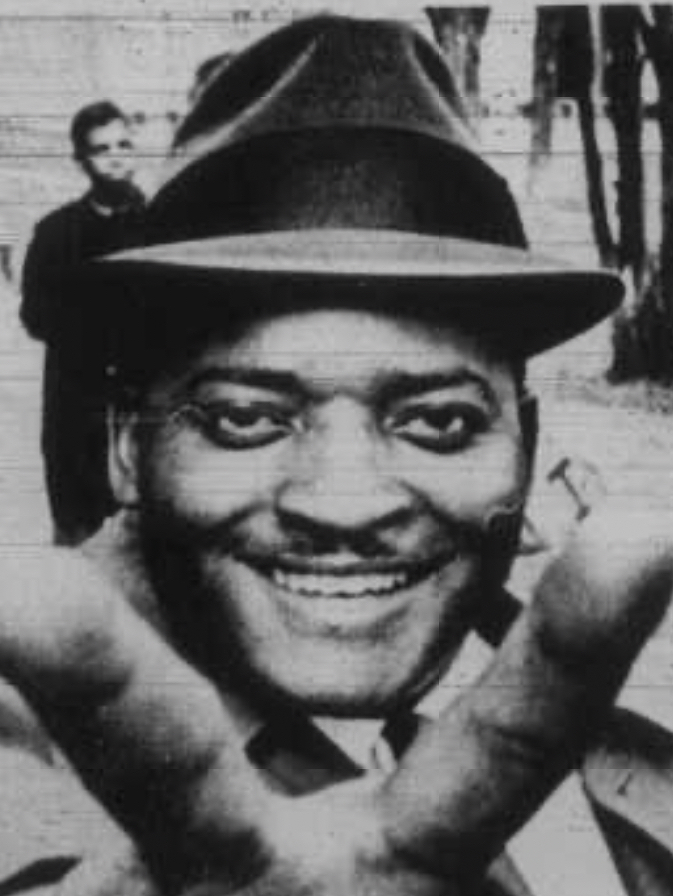

Sheriff of Macon County, Alabama
- In office 1967–1987

Personal details
- Born: October 7, 1933 Clinton, Alabama, U.S.
- Died: March 1994 (aged 60) Tuskegee, Alabama, U.S.
- Party: Democratic
- Other political affiliations: National Democratic Party of Alabama
- Education: Tuskegee Institute

Military service
- Branch/service: United States Army
- Rank: Sergeant First Class
- Unit: 82nd Airborne Division

Lucius Davenport Amerson (October 7, 1933 – March 1994) was an American law enforcement officer notable for being the first black sheriff in the South since Reconstruction. He was elected to office in Macon County, Alabama, in 1966, and started his role in 1967. Amerson served for 20 years, until 1987, being reelected four times.

== Early life and family ==
Amerson was born in Clinton, Alabama in 1933, the son of Henry Amerson, a farmer, and Lewinie Amerson.

At age 17, Amerson dropped out of high school to join the Army. He served for eight and a half years in the army, including in the Korean War as a paratrooper and as a drill sergeant. Afterwards Amerson would study electronics at Tuskegee Institute.

Amerson had three sons, Lucius Amerson Jr., Peter Amerson, and Anthony Amerson.

== Career ==
Amerson was elected sheriff of Macon County, Alabama in 1966, the year after the Voting Rights Act of 1965 was passed, and assumed office on January 16, 1967. He was the first black sheriff elected in the South since Reconstruction.

Amerson's election was headline news across the United States, with reporters descending upon Macon County. Amerson received a congratulatory telegram from Vice President Hubert Humphrey and was invited to the White House to meet President Lyndon B. Johnson.

In a February 1994 interview with The Tuskegee News, Amerson said that all his deputies quit when he took office: "They wouldn't work with me". He also described the difficulties he faced from his colleagues: "The people in the public didn't see the experiences I had with the circuit judges, clerks, and prosecutors, who were supposed to help me with my job. They were trying to show that a black sheriff couldn't be effective." He also said that white people in the county attempted to get constables elected so that they could bypass the sheriff's office. While the attempt never succeeded, The Montgomery Advertiser came out in support of the idea in an editorial.

In 1968, Amerson's department arrested two white officers, a police chief and a state trooper, after a black man said he was beaten while being arrested. Both were later acquitted. Amerson would face a similar charge himself in a 1971 federal indictment where he was accused of assaulting a black suspect. Amerson was defended by State Legislator Fred Gray and State Attorney General William J. Baxley and was acquitted.

Amerson said he encountered James Earl Ray in 1968 several days before Ray assassinated Martin Luther King Jr.. Ray evidently came by the sheriff's department and asked Amerson what he thought about George Wallace. Amerson said he didn't talk to Ray much but did think the man was a person who could do someone some harm. A few days after King was assassinated, Amerson saw a picture of Ray and realized the assassin was the same man who'd come up to him at the sheriff's office.

In the 1972 special election for Alabama's 3rd congressional district, Amerson was a progressive-backed Democratic candidate. He lost the nomination to Elizabeth B. Andrews in a 72-17 vote.

Amerson would serve as Macon County's sheriff until 1987, having been reelected four times. After retiring as sheriff, Amerson unsuccessfully tried to run for the Alabama state legislature.

== Death ==
Amerson was found dead in his home in Tuskegee, Alabama on March 15, 1994, at age 60. He had suffered a serious heart attack three years earlier. He was trying to start a restaurant called Captain Catfish in Tuskegee when he died.

In an interview a few weeks before his death, Amerson said "I'm proud that I was able to make a contribution to the community, and I would do it all over again. ... A person can be anything they want to be if they don't give up their goals."

== Legacy ==
Amerson has been called "a pioneering figure in civil rights and law enforcement," with the National Law Enforcement Museum holding his archives and mementos including a Colt revolver that was burned and scarred when his patrol car crashed while chasing a stolen vehicle in rural Alabama.
