= 2022 United States attorney general elections =

- November 8, 2022

33 attorney general offices 30 states; 2 territories; 1 federal district (Note: Seat tallies and popular vote do not include states that do not elect attorneys general or territorial attorneys general.)
	Majority party	Minority party
Party	Republican	Democratic
Seats before	24	19
Seats after	23	20
Seat change	▼1	▲1
Seats up	15	15
Seats won	14	16
- Democratic hold Democratic gain Republican hold Republican gain Nonpartisan No election

The 2022 United States attorney general elections were held on November 8, 2022, to elect the attorneys general in thirty states, two territories, and one federal district. The previous elections for this group of states took place in 2018. The attorney general of Vermont serves two-year terms and was last elected in 2020.

Seven states do not popularly elect an attorney general. (Note: In Alaska, Hawaii, New Hampshire, New Jersey, and Wyoming, the attorney general is appointed by the governor. The attorney general in Tennessee is appointed by the Tennessee Supreme Court for an eight-year term. In Maine, the attorney general is elected by the state Legislature for a two-year term.) These elections took place concurrently with several other federal, state, and local elections. Democrats had a net gain of one seat in these elections, flipping Arizona and Vermont, while Republicans flipped Iowa.

== Partisan composition before the election ==
Going into the election, there were 23 Republican attorneys general and 20 Democratic attorneys general. This class of attorneys general was made of 15 Democrats and 15 Republicans.

Republicans defended three states won by Joe Biden in 2020 (Georgia, Arizona, and Vermont), while Democrats defended one state won by Donald Trump (Iowa). Additionally, Democrats held attorney general offices in three states with Republican governors. By contrast, Republicans held attorney general offices in one state with a Democratic governor.

== Election predictions ==
Several sites and individuals published predictions of competitive seats. These predictions looked at factors such as the strength of the incumbent (if the incumbent is running for re-election), the strength of the candidates, and the partisan leanings of the state (reflected in part by the state's Cook Partisan Voting Index rating). The predictions assigned ratings to each seat, with the rating indicating the predicted advantage that a party has in winning that seat.

Most election predictors used:

- "tossup": no advantage
- "tilt" (used by some predictors): advantage that is not quite as strong as "lean"
- "lean": slight advantage
- "likely": significant, but surmountable, advantage
- "safe": near-certain chance of victory

State	PVI	Incumbent	Last race	Sabato Nov. 3 2022	ED Nov. 7 2022	Result
Alabama	R+15	Steve Marshall	58.8% R	Safe R	Safe R	Steve Marshall
Arizona	R+3	Mark Brnovich (term-limited)	51.7% R	Tossup	Leans R	Kristin Mayes (flip)
Arkansas	R+16	Leslie Rutledge (term-limited)	61.8% R	Safe R	Safe R	Tim Griffin
California	D+14	Rob Bonta	Appointed (2021) (Note: Democrat Xavier Becerra won with 63.6% of the vote in 2018, but resigned on March 18, 2021.)	Safe D	Safe D	Rob Bonta
Colorado	D+3	Phil Weiser	51.6% D	Leans D	Likely D	Phil Weiser
Connecticut	D+7	William Tong	52.5% D	Safe D	Safe D	William Tong
Delaware	D+6	Kathy Jennings	61.3% D	Safe D	Safe D	Kathy Jennings
Florida	R+3	Ashley Moody	52.1% R	Safe R	Safe R	Ashley Moody
Georgia	R+3	Chris Carr	51.3% R	Leans R	Likely R	Chris Carr
Idaho	R+19	Lawrence Wasden (lost renomination)	62.5% R	Leans R	Leans R	Raúl Labrador
Illinois	D+7	Kwame Raoul	54.7% D	Safe D	Safe D	Kwame Raoul
Iowa	R+6	Tom Miller	76.5% D	Leans D	Leans D	Brenna Bird (flip)
Kansas	R+11	Derek Schmidt (retiring)	59.0% R	Tossup	Leans R	Kris Kobach
Maryland	D+14	Brian Frosh (retiring)	64.8% D	Safe D	Safe D	Anthony Brown
Massachusetts	D+14	Maura Healey (retiring)	69.9% D	Safe D	Safe D	Andrea Campbell
Michigan	R+1	Dana Nessel	49.0% D	Leans D	Leans D	Dana Nessel
Minnesota	D+1	Keith Ellison	49.0% DFL	Tossup	Leans R (flip)	Keith Ellison
Nebraska	R+13	Doug Peterson (retiring)	100.0% R (Note: Peterson ran unopposed in 2018.)	Safe R	Safe R	Mike Hilgers
Nevada	EVEN	Aaron Ford	47.2% D	Tossup	Leans D	Aaron Ford
New Mexico	D+3	Hector Balderas (term-limited)	61.8% D	Leans D	Likely D	Raúl Torrez
New York	D+10	Letitia James	62.4% D	Safe D	Safe D	Letitia James
North Dakota	R+20	Drew Wrigley	Appointed (2022) (Note: Republican Wayne Stenehjem won with 67.6% of the vote in 2018, but died on January 28, 2022.)	Safe R	Safe R	Drew Wrigley
Ohio	R+6	Dave Yost	52.2% R	Safe R	Safe R	Dave Yost
Oklahoma	R+20	John M. O'Connor (lost nomination)	Appointed (2021) (Note: Republican Mike Hunter won with 64.0% of the vote in 2018, but resigned on June 1, 2021.)	Safe R	Safe R	Gentner Drummond
Rhode Island	D+8	Peter Neronha	79.8% D	Safe D	Safe D	Peter Neronha
South Carolina	R+8	Alan Wilson	55.1% R	Safe R	Safe R	Alan Wilson
South Dakota	R+16	Mark Vargo (retiring)	Appointed (2022) (Note: Republican Jason Ravnsborg won with 55.2% of the vote in 2018, but was removed from office on June 21, 2022.)	Safe R	Safe R	Marty Jackley
Texas	R+5	Ken Paxton	50.6% R	Leans R	Likely R	Ken Paxton
Vermont	D+15	Susanne Young (retiring)	Appointed (2022) (Note: Democrat T. J. Donovan won with 63.1% of the vote in 2020, but resigned on June 20, 2022.)	Safe D (flip)	Safe D (flip)	Charity Clark (flip)
Wisconsin	R+2	Josh Kaul	49.4% D	Tossup	Leans R (flip)	Josh Kaul

== Race summary ==
=== States ===
State	Attorney General	Party	First elected	Status	Candidates
Alabama	Steve Marshall	Republican	2017 (Note: Marshall took office in 2017 after his predecessor (Luther Strange) resigned. He was subsequently elected in the 2018 Alabama Attorney General election.)	Incumbent re-elected.	▌ ✓ Steve Marshall (Republican) 68.0%; ▌Wendell Major (Democratic) 32.0%
Arizona	Mark Brnovich	Republican	2014	Incumbent term-limited. New attorney general elected. Democratic gain.	▌ ✓ Kristin Mayes (Democratic) 50.01%; ▌Abraham Hamadeh (Republican) 49.99%
Arkansas	Leslie Rutledge	Republican	2014	Incumbent term-limited. New attorney general elected. Republican hold.	▌ ✓ Tim Griffin (Republican) 67.6%; ▌Jesse Gibson (Democratic) 32.4%
California	Rob Bonta	Democratic	2021 (Note: Bonta took office after his predecessor (Xavier Becerra) resigned.)	Interim appointee elected.	▌ ✓ Rob Bonta (Democratic) 59.1%; ▌Nathan Hochman (Republican) 40.9%
Colorado	Phil Weiser	Democratic	2018	Incumbent re-elected.	▌ ✓ Phil Weiser (Democratic) 54.7%; ▌John Kellner (Republican) 43.0%; ▌William Robinson III (Libertarian) 2.2%
Connecticut	William Tong	Democratic	2018	Incumbent re-elected.	▌ ✓ William Tong (Democratic) 57.0%; ▌Jessica Kordas (Republican) 41.4%
Delaware	Kathy Jennings	Democratic	2018	Incumbent re-elected.	▌ ✓ Kathy Jennings (Democratic) 53.8%; ▌Julianne Murray (Republican) 46.2%
Florida	Ashley Moody	Republican	2018	Incumbent re-elected.	▌ ✓ Ashley Moody (Republican) 60.6%; ▌Aramis Ayala (Democratic) 39.4%
Georgia	Chris Carr	Republican	2016 (Note: Carr took office in 2016 after his predecessor (Sam Olens) resigned. He was subsequently elected in the 2018 Georgia Attorney General election.)	Incumbent re-elected.	▌ ✓ Chris Carr (Republican) 51.9%; ▌Jen Jordan (Democratic) 46.6%; ▌Martin Cowen (Libertarian) 1.5%
Idaho	Lawrence Wasden	Republican	2002	Incumbent lost renomination. New attorney general elected. Republican hold.	▌ ✓ Raúl Labrador (Republican) 62.6%; ▌Tom Arkoosh (Democratic) 37.4%
Illinois	Kwame Raoul	Democratic	2018	Incumbent re-elected.	▌ ✓ Kwame Raoul (Democratic) 53.9%; ▌Tom DeVore (Republican) 43.9%; ▌Daniel Robin (Libertarian) 2.2%
Iowa	Tom Miller	Democratic	1978; 1990 (retired); 1994	Incumbent lost re-election. New attorney general elected. Republican gain.	▌ ✓ Brenna Bird (Republican) 50.9%; ▌Tom Miller (Democratic) 49.1%
Kansas	Derek Schmidt	Republican	2010	Incumbent retired to run for governor of Kansas. New attorney general elected. Republican hold.	▌ ✓ Kris Kobach (Republican) 50.8%; ▌Chris Mann (Democratic) 49.2%
Maryland	Brian Frosh	Democratic	2014	Incumbent retired. New attorney general elected. Democratic hold.	▌ ✓ Anthony Brown (Democratic) 65.0%; ▌Michael Peroutka (Republican) 35.0%
Massachusetts	Maura Healey	Democratic	2014	Incumbent retired to run for governor of Massachusetts. New attorney general elected. Democratic hold.	▌ ✓ Andrea Campbell (Democratic) 62.6%; ▌Jay McMahon (Republican) 37.4%
Michigan	Dana Nessel	Democratic	2018	Incumbent re-elected.	▌ ✓ Dana Nessel (Democratic) 53.2%; ▌Matthew DePerno (Republican) 44.6%; ▌Joseph McHugh (Libertarian) 1.5%
Minnesota	Keith Ellison	DFL	2018	Incumbent re-elected.	▌ ✓ Keith Ellison (DFL) 50.4%; ▌Jim Schultz (Republican) 49.6%
Nebraska	Doug Peterson	Republican	2014	Incumbent retired. New attorney general elected. Republican hold.	▌ ✓ Mike Hilgers (Republican) 69.7%; ▌Larry Bolinger (Legal Marijuana Now) 30.3%
Nevada	Aaron Ford	Democratic	2018	Incumbent re-elected.	▌ ✓ Aaron Ford (Democratic) 52.3%; ▌Sigal Chattah (Republican) 44.4%; ▌None of These Candidates 3.4%
New Mexico	Hector Balderas	Democratic	2014	Incumbent term-limited. New attorney general elected. Democratic hold.	▌ ✓ Raúl Torrez (Democratic) 55.3%; ▌Jeremy Gay (Republican) 44.7%
New York	Letitia James	Democratic	2018	Incumbent re-elected.	▌ ✓ Letitia James (Democratic) 54.3%; ▌Michael Henry (Republican) 45.7%
North Dakota	Drew Wrigley	Republican	2022 (Note: Wrigley was appointed after his predecessor (Wayne Stenehjem) died.)	Interim appointee elected.	▌ ✓ Drew Wrigley (Republican) 71.1%; ▌Timothy Lamb (Democratic–NPL) 28.9%
Ohio	Dave Yost	Republican	2018	Incumbent re-elected.	▌ ✓ Dave Yost (Republican) 60.4%; ▌Jeffrey Crossman (Democratic) 39.6%
Oklahoma	John M. O'Connor	Republican	2021 (Note: O'Connor took office after his predecessor (Michael J. Hunter) resigned.)	Interim appointee lost nomination to full term. New attorney general elected. Republican hold.	▌ ✓ Gentner Drummond (Republican) 73.8%; ▌Lynda Steele (Libertarian) 26.2%
Rhode Island	Peter Neronha	Democratic	2018	Incumbent re-elected.	▌ ✓ Peter Neronha (Democratic) 61.6%; ▌Chas Calenda (Republican) 38.4%
South Carolina	Alan Wilson	Republican	2010	Incumbent re-elected.	▌ ✓ Alan Wilson (Republican)
South Dakota	Mark Vargo	Republican	2022 (Note: Vargo took office after his predecessor, Jason Ravnsborg, was impeached and removed from office.)	Incumbent retired. New attorney general elected. Republican hold.	▌ ✓ Marty Jackley (Republican)
Texas	Ken Paxton	Republican	2014	Incumbent re-elected.	▌ ✓ Ken Paxton (Republican) 53.4%; ▌ Rochelle Mercedes Garza (Democratic) 43.7%; ▌Mark Ash (Libertarian) 2.9%
Vermont	Susanne Young	Republican	2022 (Note: Young took office after her predecessor (T. J. Donovan) resigned.)	Interim appointee retired. New attorney general elected. Democratic gain.	▌ ✓ Charity Clark (Democratic) 65.1%; ▌Mike Tagliavia (Republican) 34.9%
Wisconsin	Josh Kaul	Democratic	2018	Incumbent re-elected.	▌ ✓ Josh Kaul (Democratic) 50.7%; ▌Eric Toney (Republican) 49.3%

=== Territories and federal district ===
State	Attorney General	Party	First elected	Status	Candidates
District of Columbia	Karl Racine	Democratic	2014	Incumbent retired. New attorney general elected. Democratic hold.	▌ ✓ Brian Schwalb (Democratic)
Guam	Leevin Camacho	Independent	2018	Incumbent lost re-election. New attorney general elected. Republican gain.	▌ ✓ Douglas Moylan (Republican) 46.2%; ▌Leevin Camacho (Independent) 46.1%; ▌Write-ins 7.7%
Northern Mariana Islands	Edward Manibusan	Nonpartisan (Note: Although Manibusan is affiliated with the Democratic Party, the CNMI Attorney General race is a nonpartisan contest and candidates do not run with a party affiliation.)	2014	Incumbent re-elected.	▌ ✓ Edward Manibusan (Nonpartisan) 55.2%; ▌Juan Tudela Lizama (Nonpartisan) 44.8%

== Closest races ==
States where the margin of victory was under 1%:

1. Arizona, 0.02%
2. Guam, 0.12%
3. Minnesota, 0.84%

States where the margin of victory was under 5%:

1. Wisconsin, 1.34%
2. Kansas, 1.68%
3. Iowa, 1.71%

States where the margin of victory was under 10%:

1. Georgia, 5.26%
2. Delaware, 7.67%
3. Nevada, 7.89%
4. New York, 8.58%
5. Michigan, 8.60%
6. Texas, 9.76%

Blue denotes races won by Democrats. Red denotes races won by Republicans.

== Alabama ==
Alabama Attorney General election
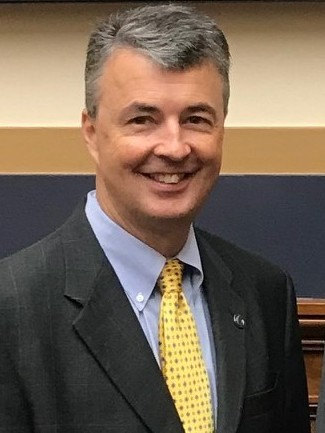

Nominee	Steve Marshall	Wendell Major
Party	Republican	Democratic
Popular vote	953,284	449,193
Percentage	68.00%	32.00%
- County results Marshall: 50–60% 60–70% 70–80% 80–90% >90% Major: 50–60% 60–70% 70–80%
Attorney General before election
Steve Marshall
Republican
Elected Attorney General
Steve Marshall
Republican

Incumbent Republican Steve Marshall ran for re-election. He was challenged by attorney Harry Still III in the primary. Tarrant police chief Wendell Major, a Democrat, ran.

Marshall and Major won their respective primaries on May 24.

In the general election, Steve Marshall won re-election.

== Arizona ==
Arizona Attorney General election
- November 8, 2022
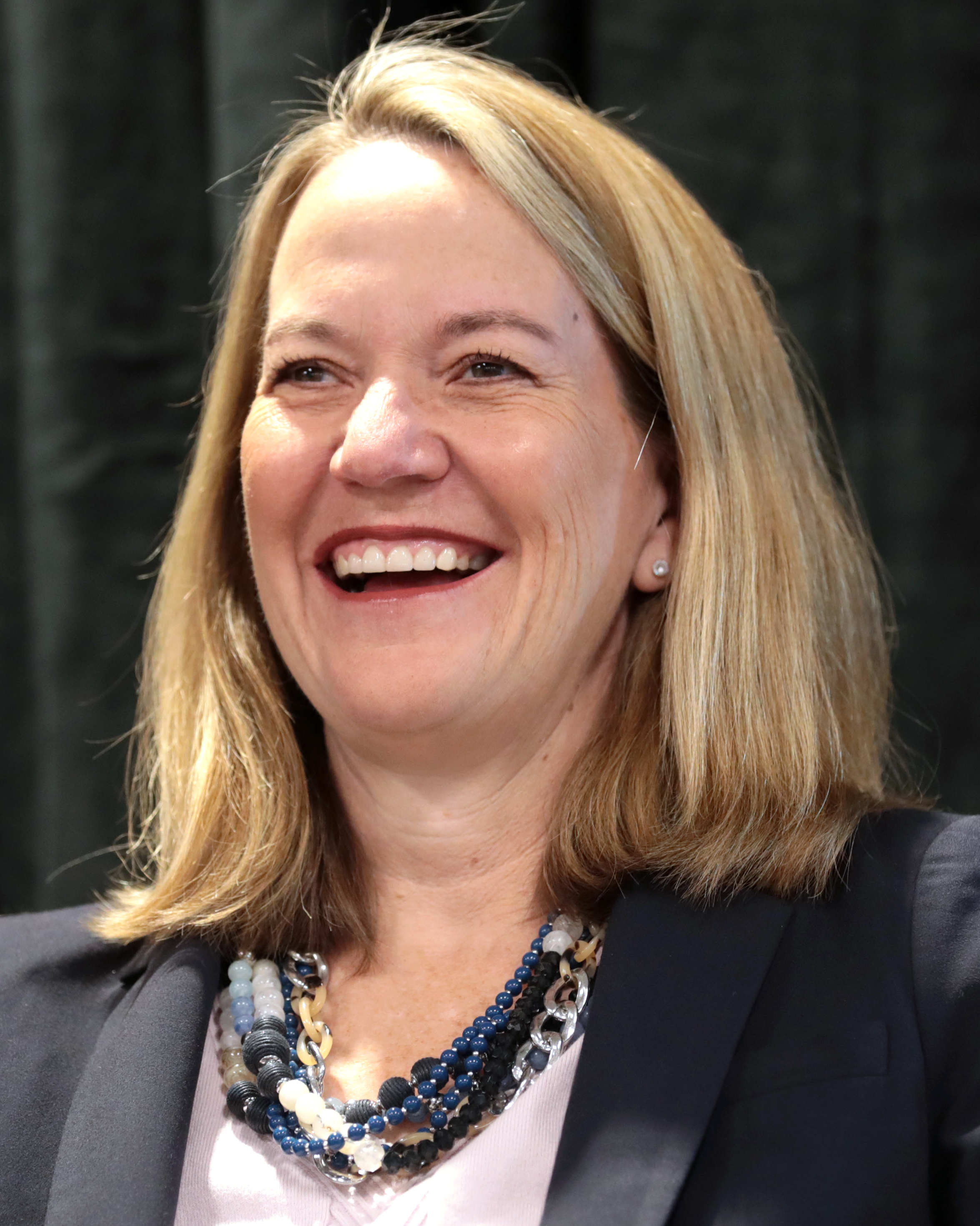

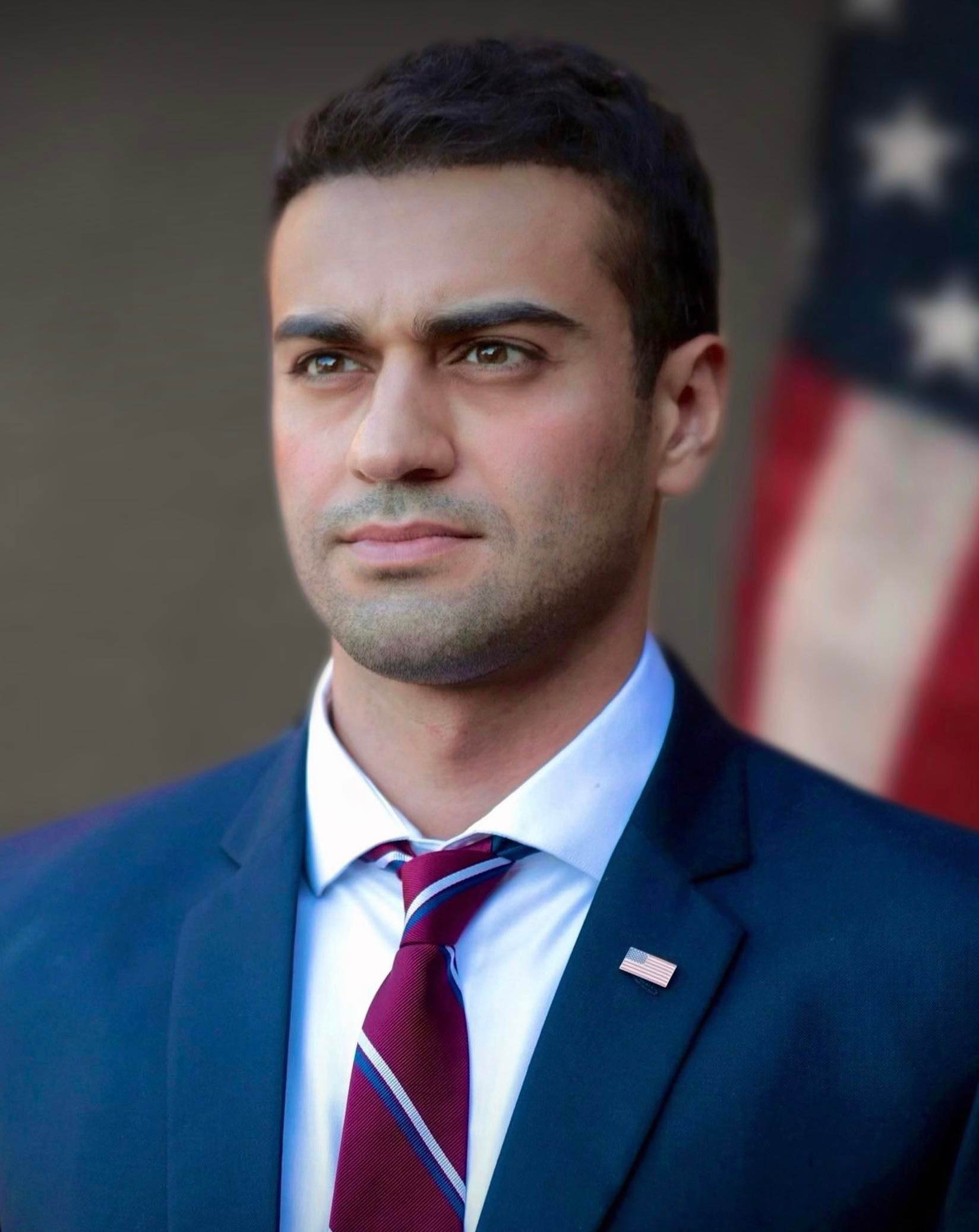
Nominee	Kris Mayes	Abraham Hamadeh
Party	Democratic	Republican
Popular vote	1,254,809	1,254,529
Percentage	49.94%	49.93%
- County results Mayes: 50–60% 60–70% Hamadeh: 50–60% 60–70% 70–80%
Attorney General before election
Mark Brnovich
Republican
Elected Attorney General
Kris Mayes
Democratic

The 2022 Arizona Attorney General election will take place on November 8, 2022, to elect the attorney general of Arizona. Incumbent Republican Attorney General Mark Brnovich was term-limited, could not seek re-election to a third term in office and instead ran for the U.S. Senate.

Republican candidates included former assistant U.S. attorney Lacy Cooper, former Tucson city councilman Rodney Glassman, former Arizona Supreme Court justice Andrew Gould, chair of the Arizona Chamber of Commerce and Industry Dawn Grove, former Maricopa County prosecutor Abraham Hamadeh, and farmer and 2020 congressional candidate Tiffany Shedd.

The only Democratic candidate is attorney and former chair of the Arizona Corporation Commission Kristin Mayes.

In the general election, Kris Mayes won by a razor-thin margin of 280 votes.

== Arkansas ==
Arkansas Attorney General election
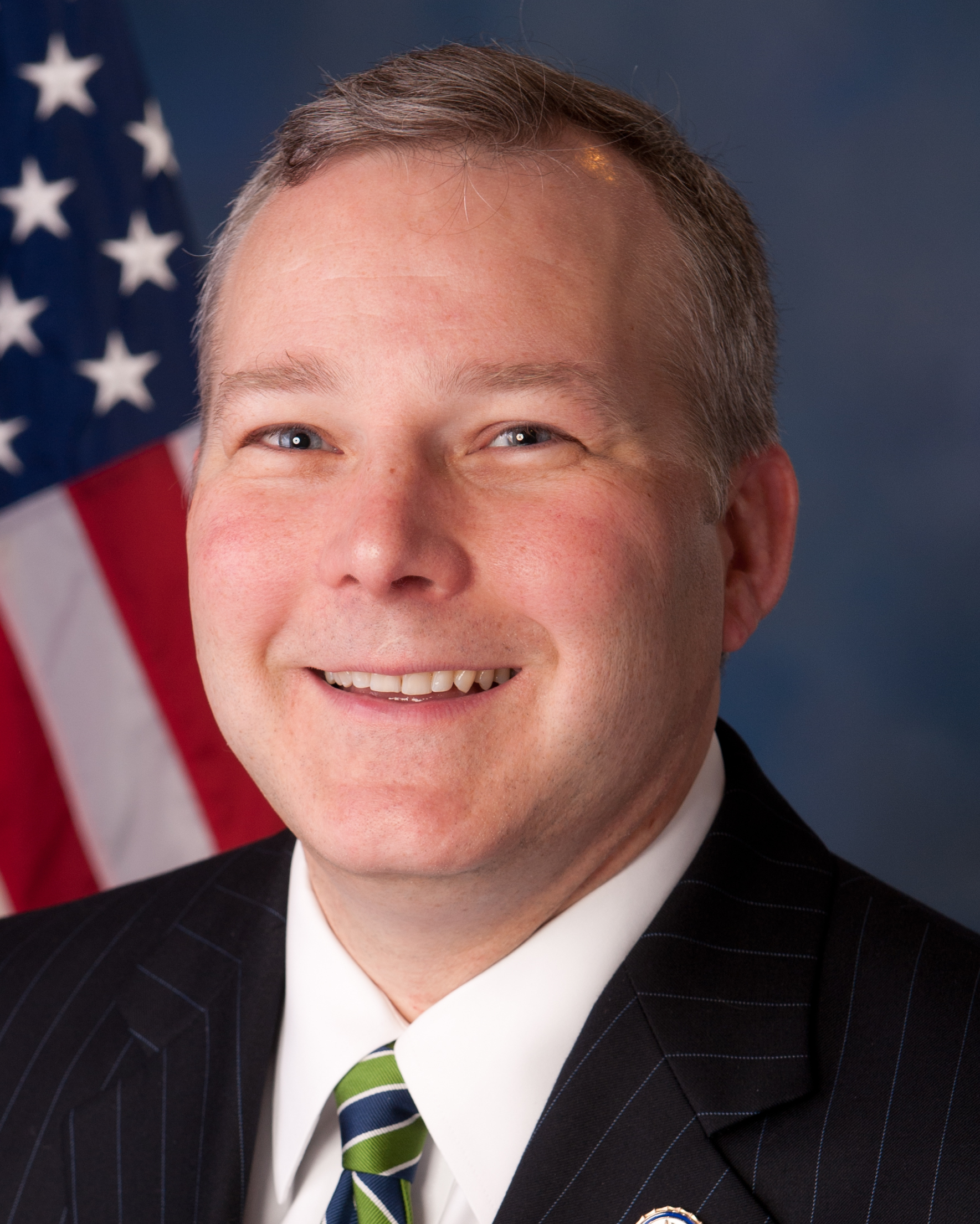

Candidate	Tim Griffin	Jesse Gibson
Party	Republican	Democratic
Popular vote	603,586	287,789
Percentage	67.7%	32.3%
- County results Griffin: 50-60% 60-70% 70-80% 80-90% Gibson: 50-60%
Attorney General before election
Leslie Rutledge
Republican
Elected Attorney General
Tim Griffin
Republican

The 2022 Arkansas Attorney General election will be held on November 8, 2022, to elect the attorney general of Arkansas. Incumbent Republican Attorney General Leslie Rutledge won re-election on November 6, 2018, to a second term. She was term-limited and decided to announce a campaign for Governor of Arkansas in 2022 but later switched to run for Lieutenant Governor of Arkansas.

Republican candidates included Lt. Governor Tim Griffin, and Attorney Leon Jones Jr. The only Democratic candidate is Little Rock lawyer Jesse Gibson.

Griffin and Gibson won their respective primaries on May 24.

In the general election, Griffin easily won.

== California ==
California Attorney General election
- November 8, 2022
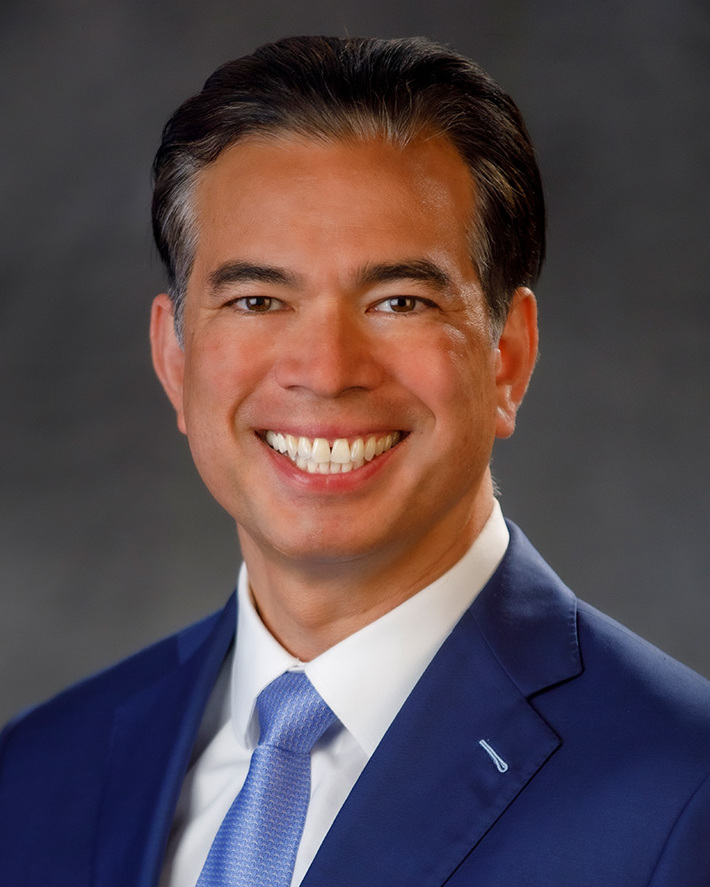

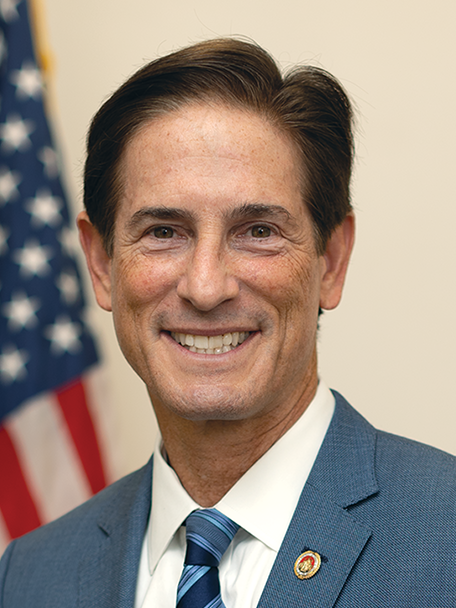
Candidate	Rob Bonta	Nathan Hochman
Party	Democratic	Republican
Popular vote	6,339,436	4,390,424
Percentage	59.1%	40.9%
- County results Bonta: 50–60% 60–70% 70–80% 80–90% Hochman: 50–60% 60–70% 70–80%
Attorney General before election
Rob Bonta
Democratic
Elected Attorney General
Rob Bonta
Democratic

The 2022 California Attorney General election will be held on November 8, 2022, to elect the attorney general of California. Incumbent Democratic Attorney General Rob Bonta was appointed to the office on April 23, 2021, following the resignation of Xavier Becerra to become the U.S. Secretary of Health and Human Services. He ran for a full term.

Republican candidates included attorney and business owner Eric Early and former assistant attorney general for the Tax Division Nathan Hochman.

Criminal defense attorney Dan Kapelovitz is running as the Green Party candidate. Sacramento district attorney Anne Marie Schubert is running as an independent.

Bonta and Hochman advanced from the nonpartisan blanket primary on June 7.

Rob Bonta won in the general election.

== Colorado ==
Colorado Attorney General election
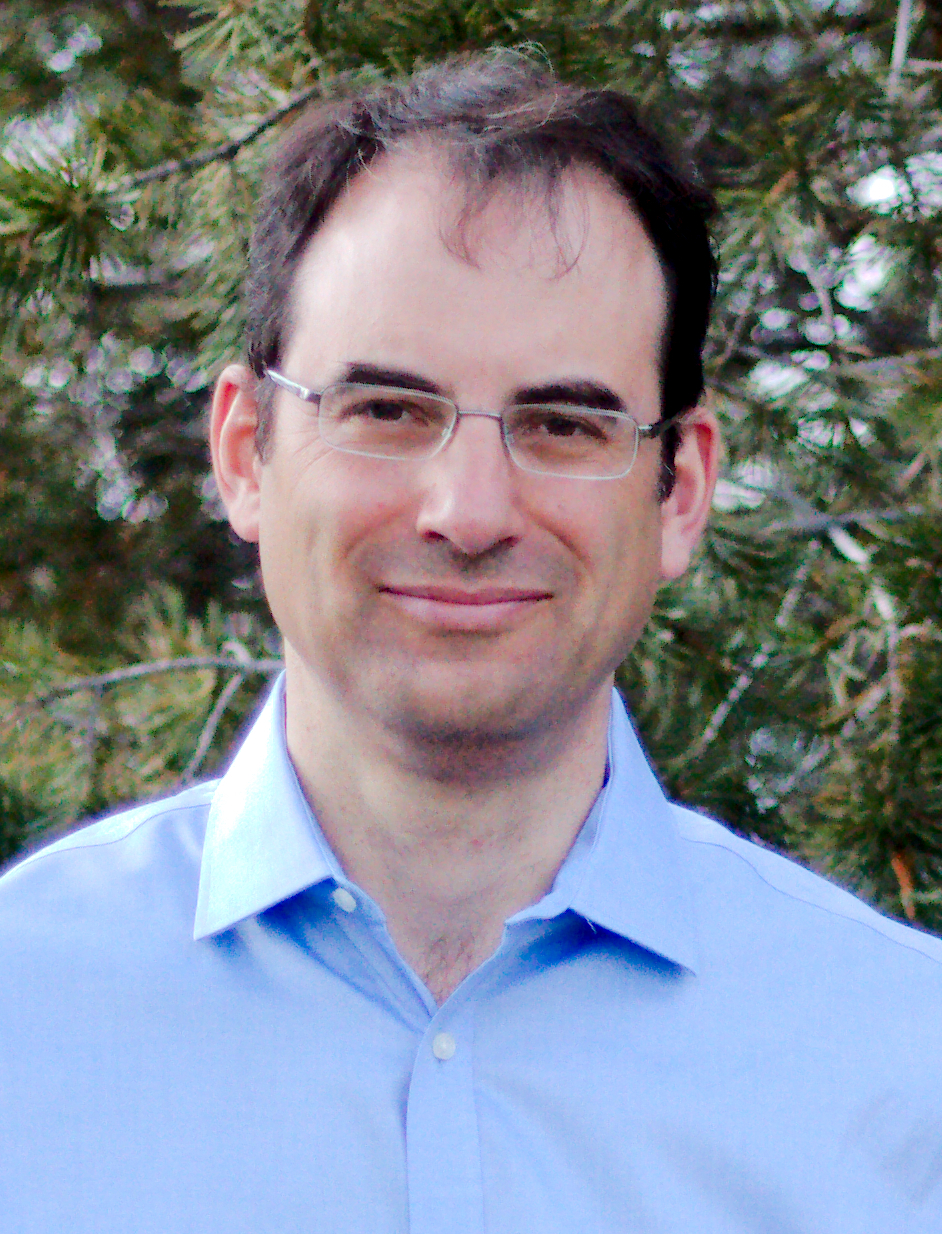

Nominee	Phil Weiser	John Kellner
Party	Democratic	Republican
Popular vote	1,349,133	1,060,866
Percentage	54.7%	43.0%
- County results Weiser: 40–50% 50–60% 60–70% 70–80% Kellner: 40–50% 50–60% 60–70% 70–80% 80–90%
Attorney General before election
Phil Weiser
Democratic
Elected Attorney General
Phil Weiser
Democratic

Incumbent Democrat Phil Weiser ran for re-election. Republican John Kellner, district attorney for the 18th district court of Colorado, ran against Weiser.

Attorney Stanley Thorne originally ran as a Republican, but was disqualified.

Weiser and Kellner won their respective primaries on June 28.

Phil Weiser won re-election.

== Connecticut ==
2022 Connecticut Attorney General election
- November 8, 2022
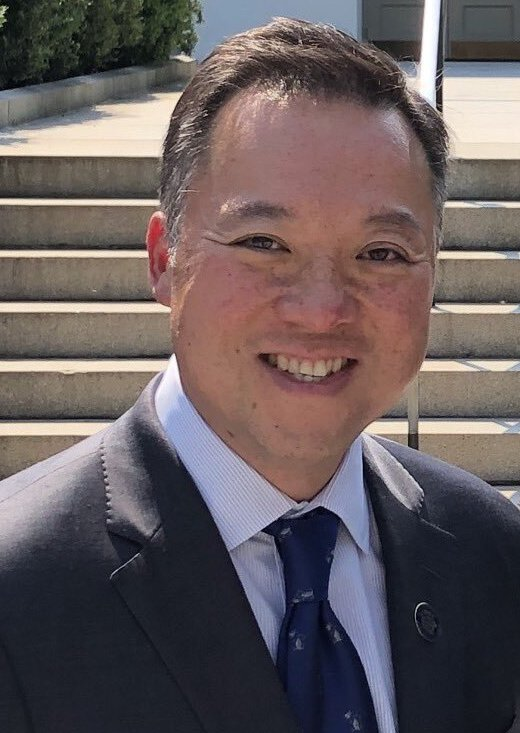

Nominee	William Tong	Jessica Kordas
Party	Democratic	Republican
Popular vote	713,894	518,128
Percentage	57.1%	41.4%
- Tong: 40–50% 50–60% 60–70% 70–80% 80-90% Kordas: 40–50% 50–60% 60–70%
Attorney General before election
William Tong
Democratic
Elected Attorney General
William Tong
Democratic

Incumbent Democrat William Tong ran for re-election. Republican attorney Jessica Kordas ran against him.

William Tong won re-election.

== Delaware ==
Delaware Attorney General election
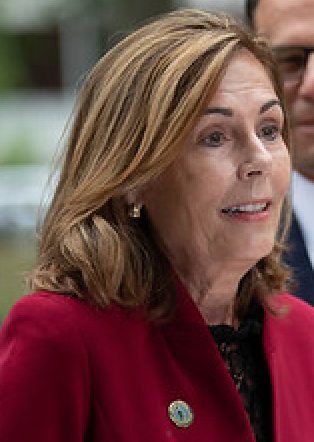

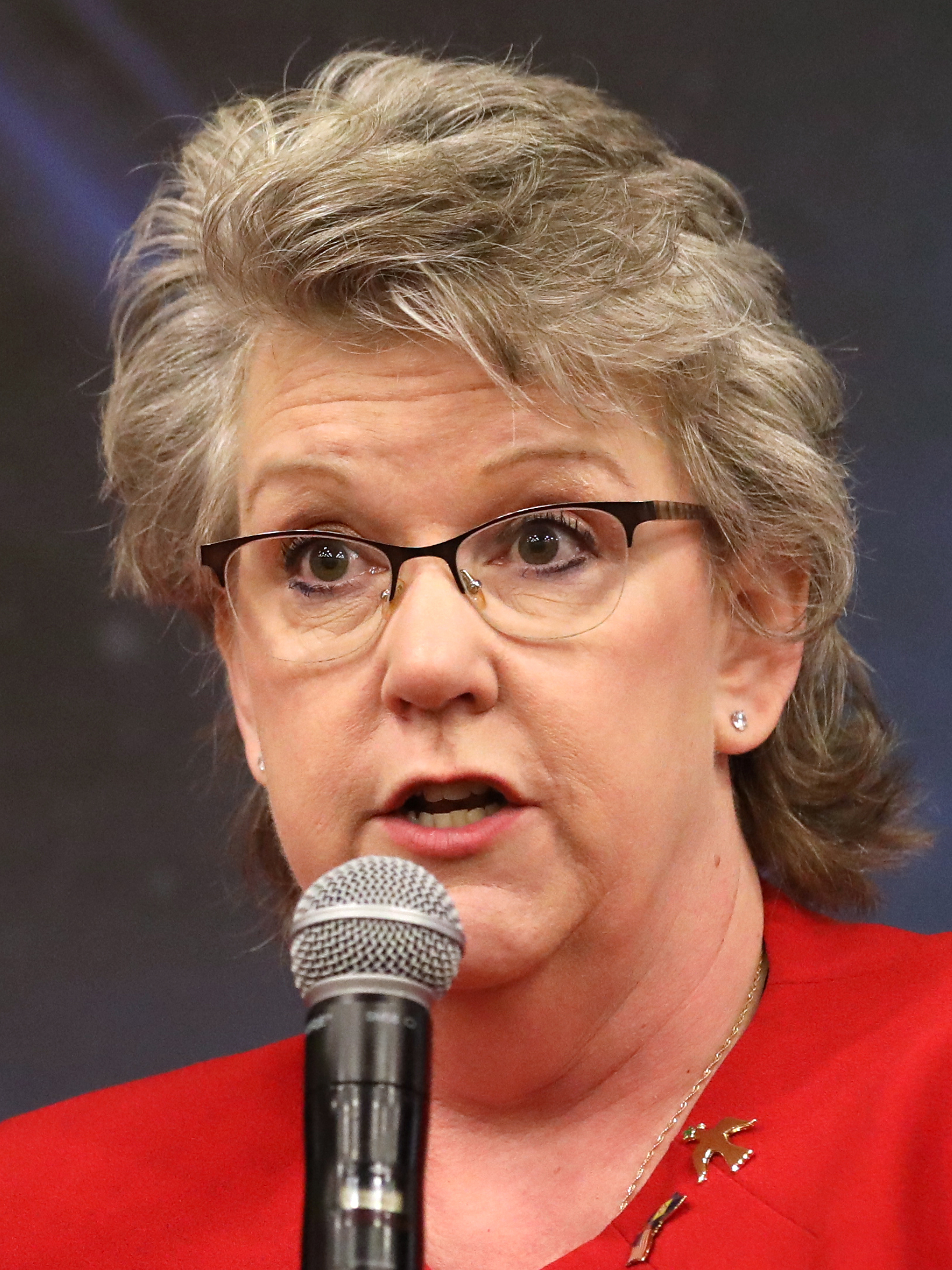
Nominee	Kathy Jennings	Julianne Murray
Party	Democratic	Republican
Popular vote	171,837	147,869
Percentage	53.8%	46.2%
- County results Jennings: 60–70% Murray: 50–60%
Attorney General before election
Kathy Jennings
Democratic
Elected Attorney General
Kathy Jennings
Democratic

Incumbent Democrat Attorney General Kathy Jennings ran for re-election.

The only Republican candidate is 2020 Republican gubernatorial nominee Julianne Murray.

Kathy Jennings won re-election by under 10%.

== Florida ==
Florida Attorney General election
- November 8, 2022
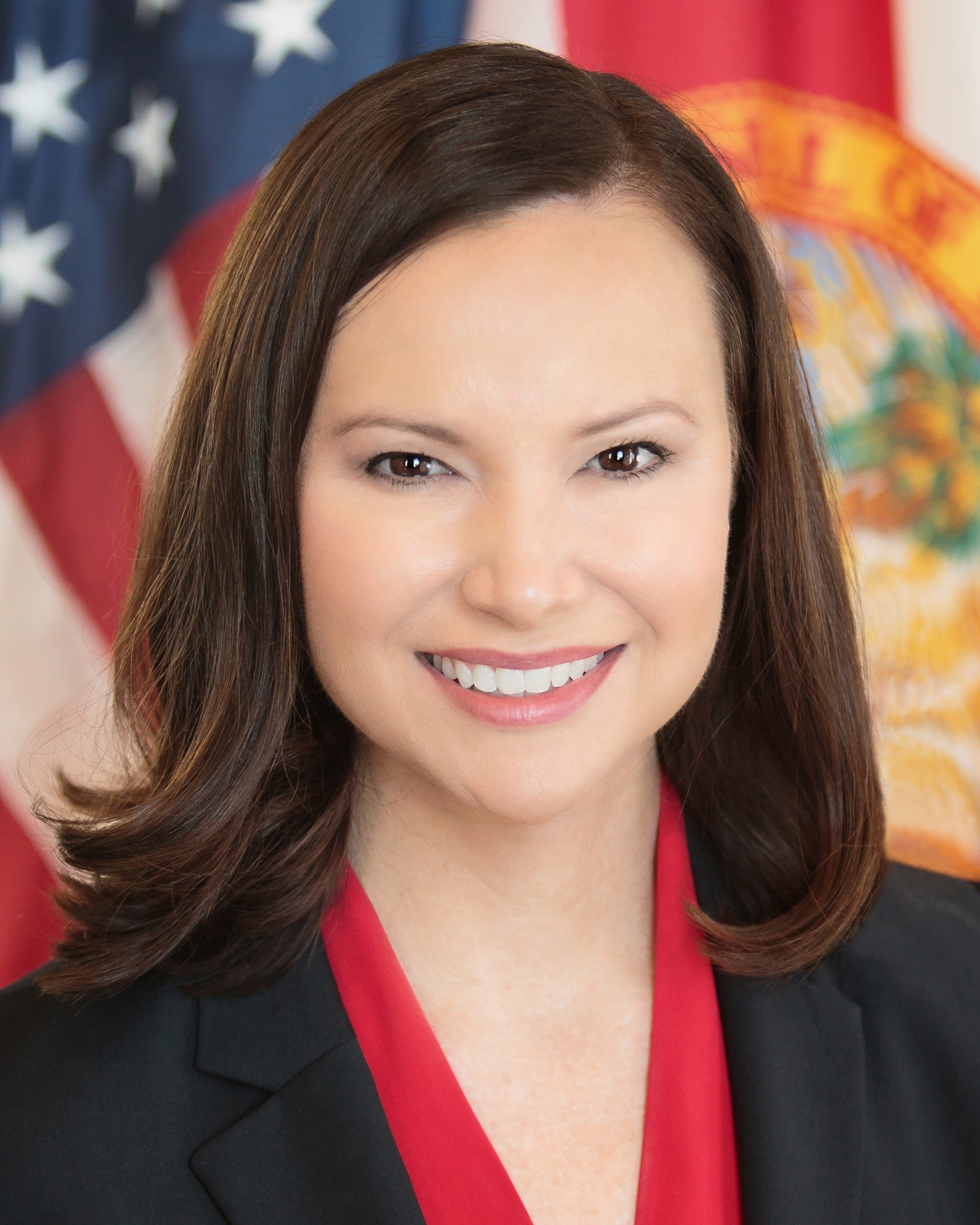

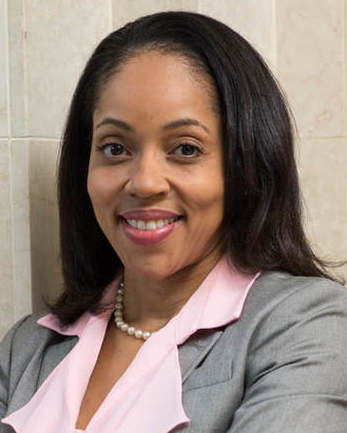
Nominee	Ashley Moody	Aramis Ayala
Party	Republican	Democratic
Popular vote	4,651,376	3,025,959
Percentage	60.6%	39.4%
- County results Moody: 50–60% 60–70% 70–80% 80–90% >90% Ayala: 50–60%
Attorney General before election
Ashley Moody
Republican
Elected Attorney General
Ashley Moody
Republican

Incumbent Republican Attorney General Ashley Moody ran for re-election.

Democratic candidates included former state attorney Aramis Ayala, Fort Lauderdale criminal defense lawyer Jim Lewis, and Santa Rosa Beach lawyer Daniel Uhlfelder.

Ayala won the Democratic primary on August 23.

In the general election, Ashley Moody won re-election with over 60% of the vote.

== Georgia ==
Georgia Attorney General election
- November 8, 2022
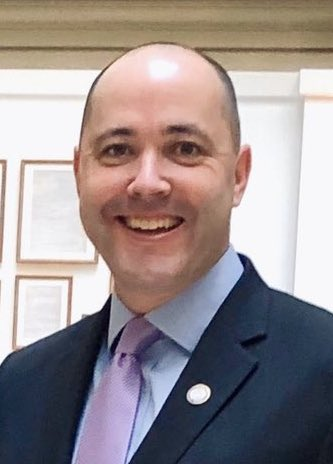

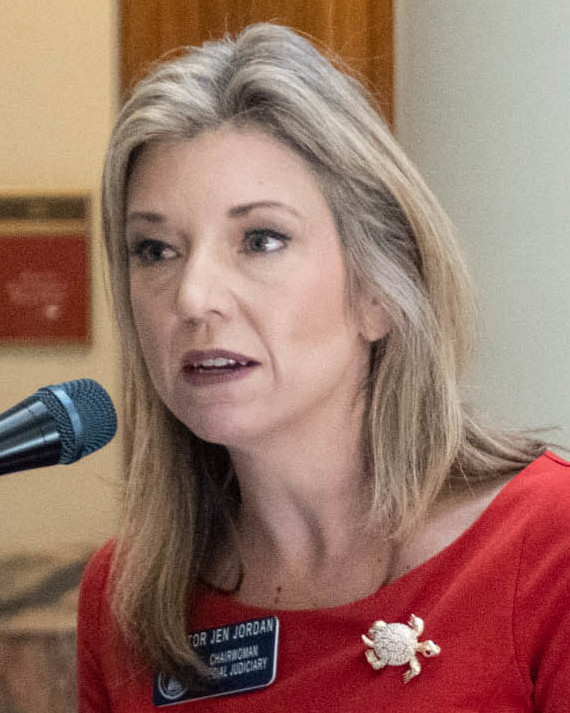
Candidate	Chris Carr	Jen Jordan
Party	Republican	Democratic
Popular vote	2,032,500	1,826,437
Percentage	51.9%	46.6%
- County results Carr: 40–50% 50–60% 60–70% 70–80% 80–90% >90% Jordan: 40–50% 50–60% 60–70% 70–80% 80–90%
Attorney General before election
Chris Carr
Republican
Elected Attorney General
Chris Carr
Republican

The 2022 Georgia Attorney General election will take place on November 8, 2022, to elect the attorney general of Georgia. Incumbent Republican Attorney General Chris Carr was appointed to the office on November 1, 2016. He won re-election to a second full term.

He faced a primary challenge from business owner John Gordon.

State Senator Jen Jordan and lawyer Christian Wise Smith ran for the Democratic nomination. Lawyer Martin Cowen ran as a Libertarian.

Carr and Jordan won their respective primaries on May 24.

In the general election, Carr won re-election by over 5% of the vote.

== Idaho ==
Idaho Attorney General election
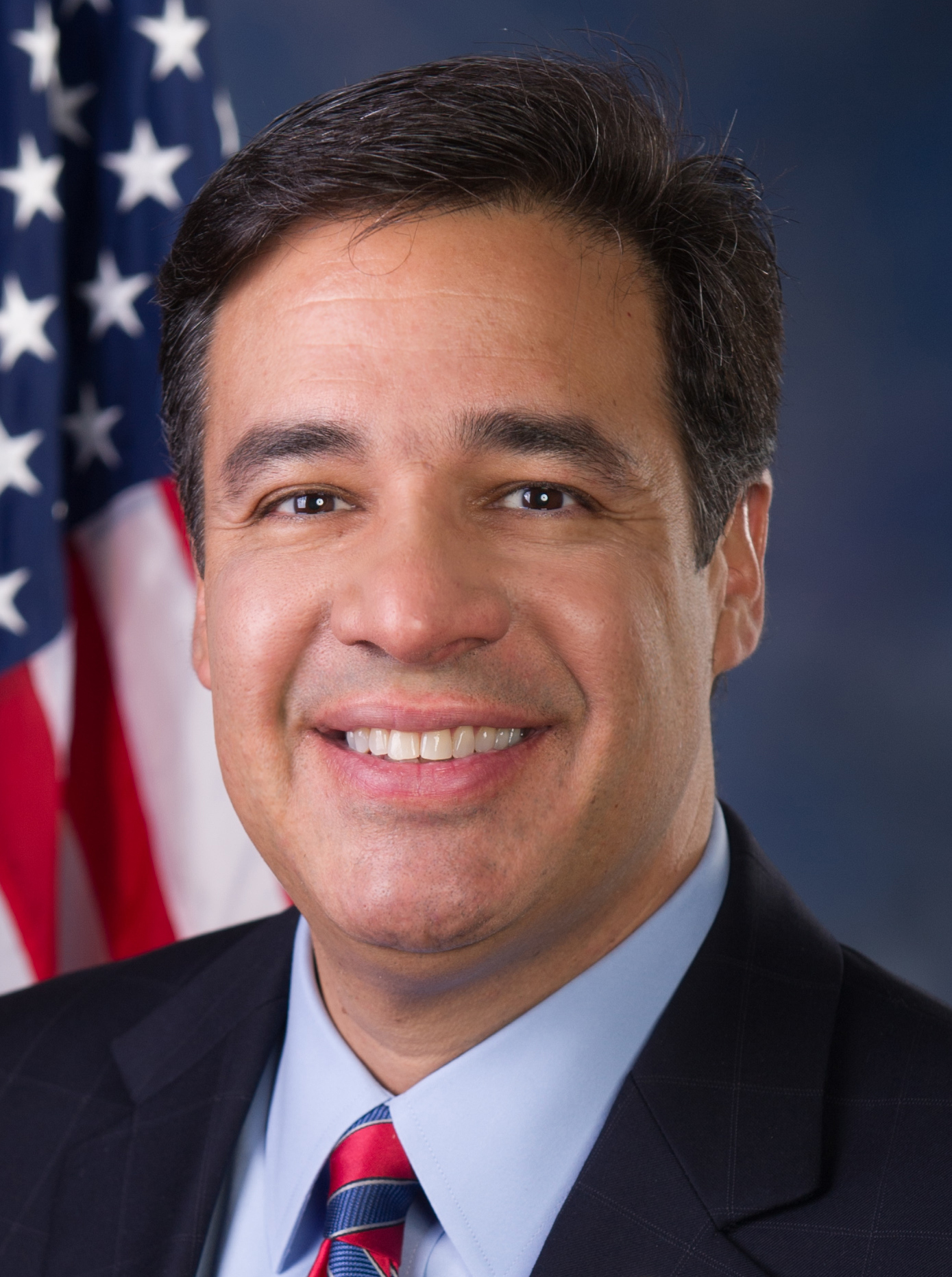

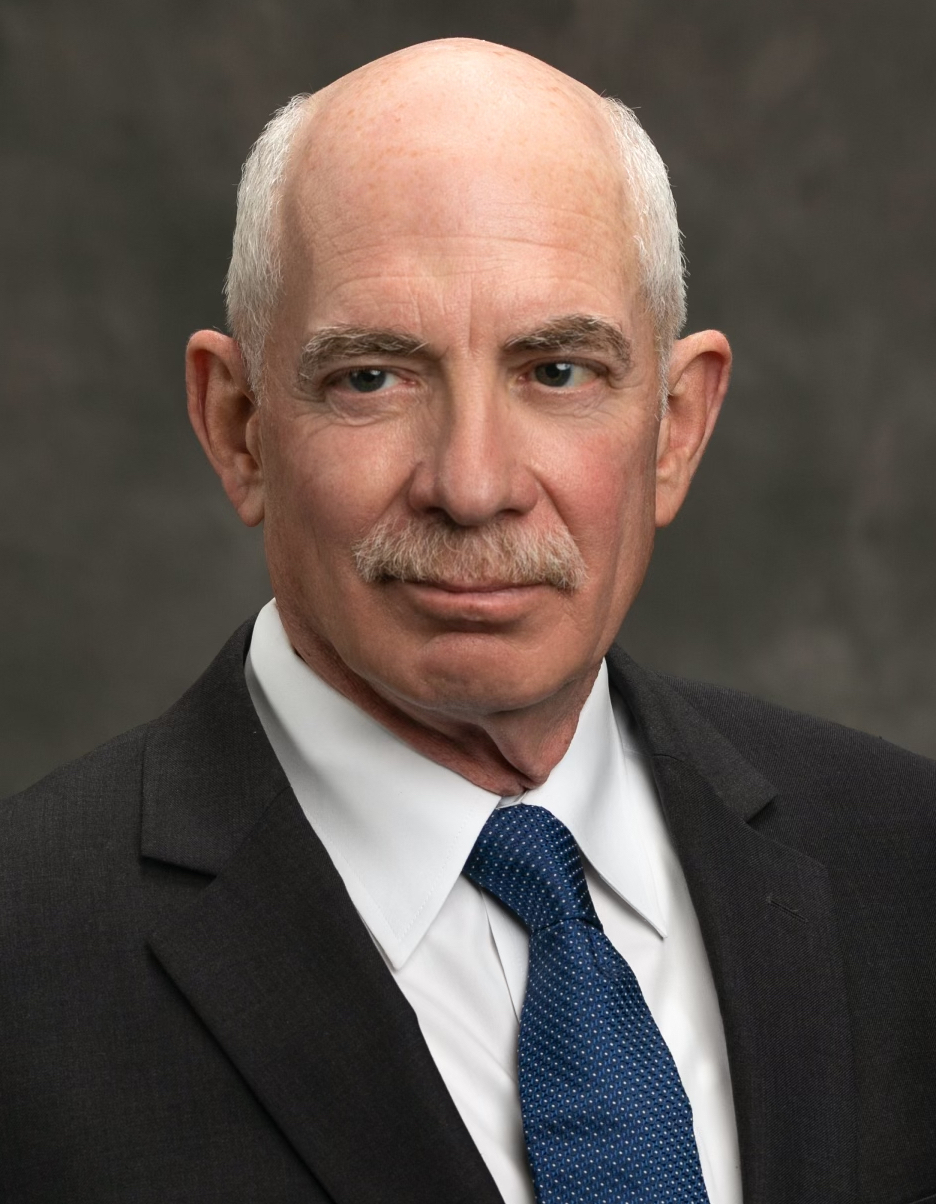
Nominee	Raúl Labrador	Tom Arkoosh
Party	Republican	Democratic
Popular vote	367,570	219,401
Percentage	62.6%	37.4%
- County results Labrador: 50–60% 60–70% 70–80% 80–90% Arkoosh: 50–60% 70–80%
Attorney General before election
Lawrence Wasden
Idaho Republican Party
Elected Attorney General
Raúl Labrador
Idaho Republican Party

Incumbent Republican Lawrence Wasden ran for re-election, but lost renomination to former U.S. representative and former chair of the Idaho Republican Party Raúl Labrador in the Republican primary.

Lawyer Steven Scanlin was the only Democratic candidate, but withdrew after securing the nomination. Boise attorney Tom Arkoosh assumed the Democratic nomination and appeared on the November ballot instead.

Labrador and Scanlin won their respective primaries on May 17.

Labrador won the general election.

== Illinois ==
Illinois Attorney General election
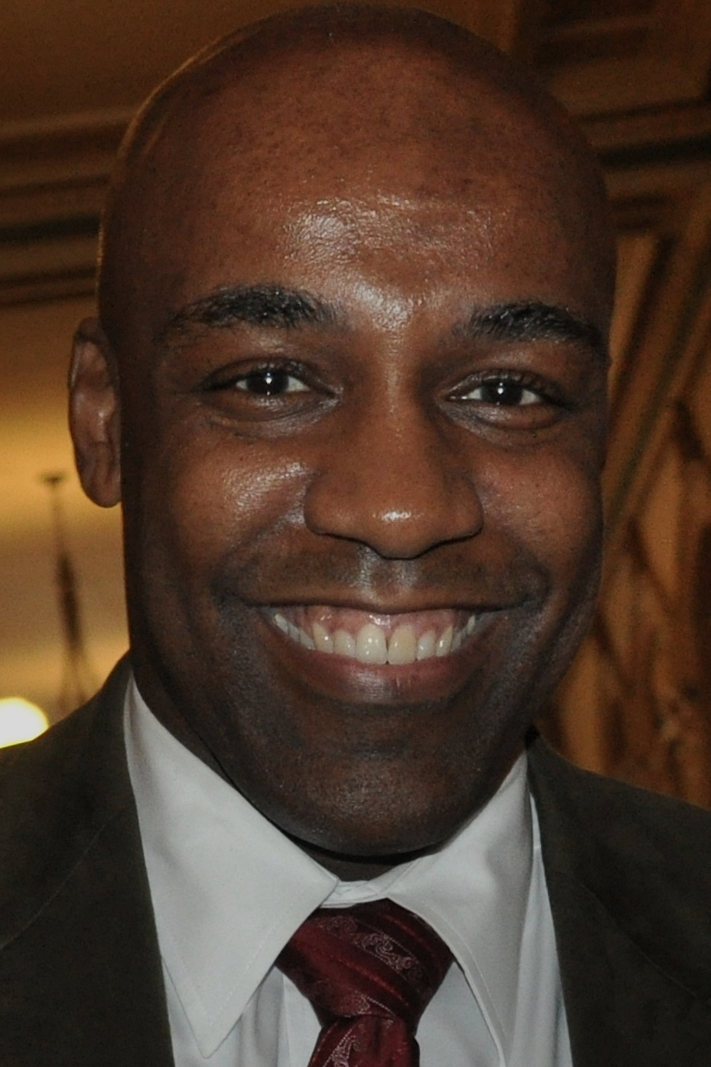

Nominee	Kwame Raoul	Tom DeVore
Party	Democratic	Republican
Popular vote	2,219,420	1,774,468
Percentage	54.4%	43.4%
- County results Raoul: 40–50% 50–60% 70–80% DeVore: 40–50% 50–60% 60–70% 70–80% 80–90%
Attorney General before election
Kwame Raoul
Democratic
Elected Attorney General
Kwame Raoul
Democratic

Incumbent Democrat Kwame Raoul ran for re-election.

Republican candidates included business attorney and Republican nominee for attorney general in 2010 Steve Kim, lawyer Tom DeVore and attorney David Shestokas.

Raoul and DeVore won their respective primaries on June 28.

Raoul won re-election by 11 points.

== Iowa ==
Iowa Attorney General election
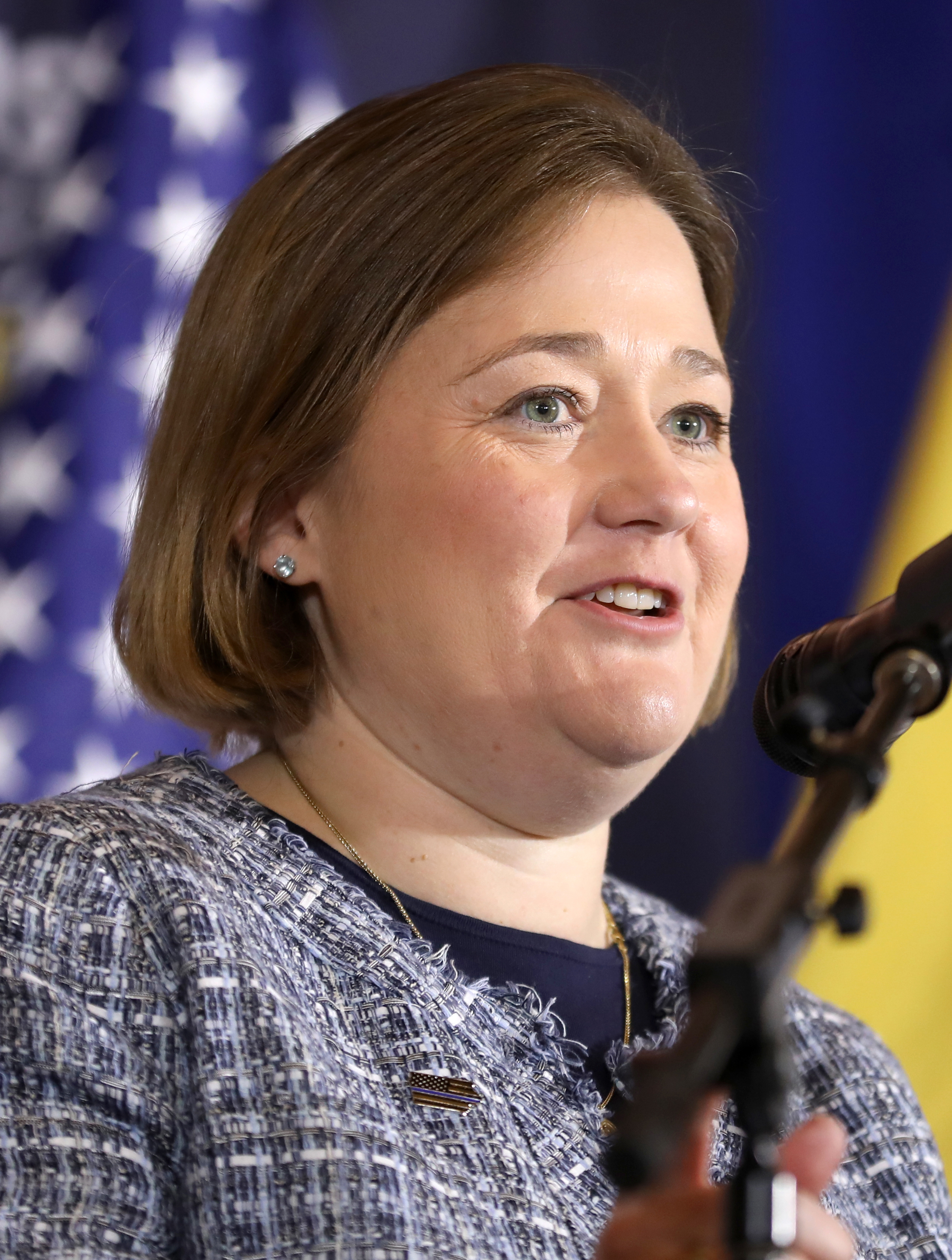

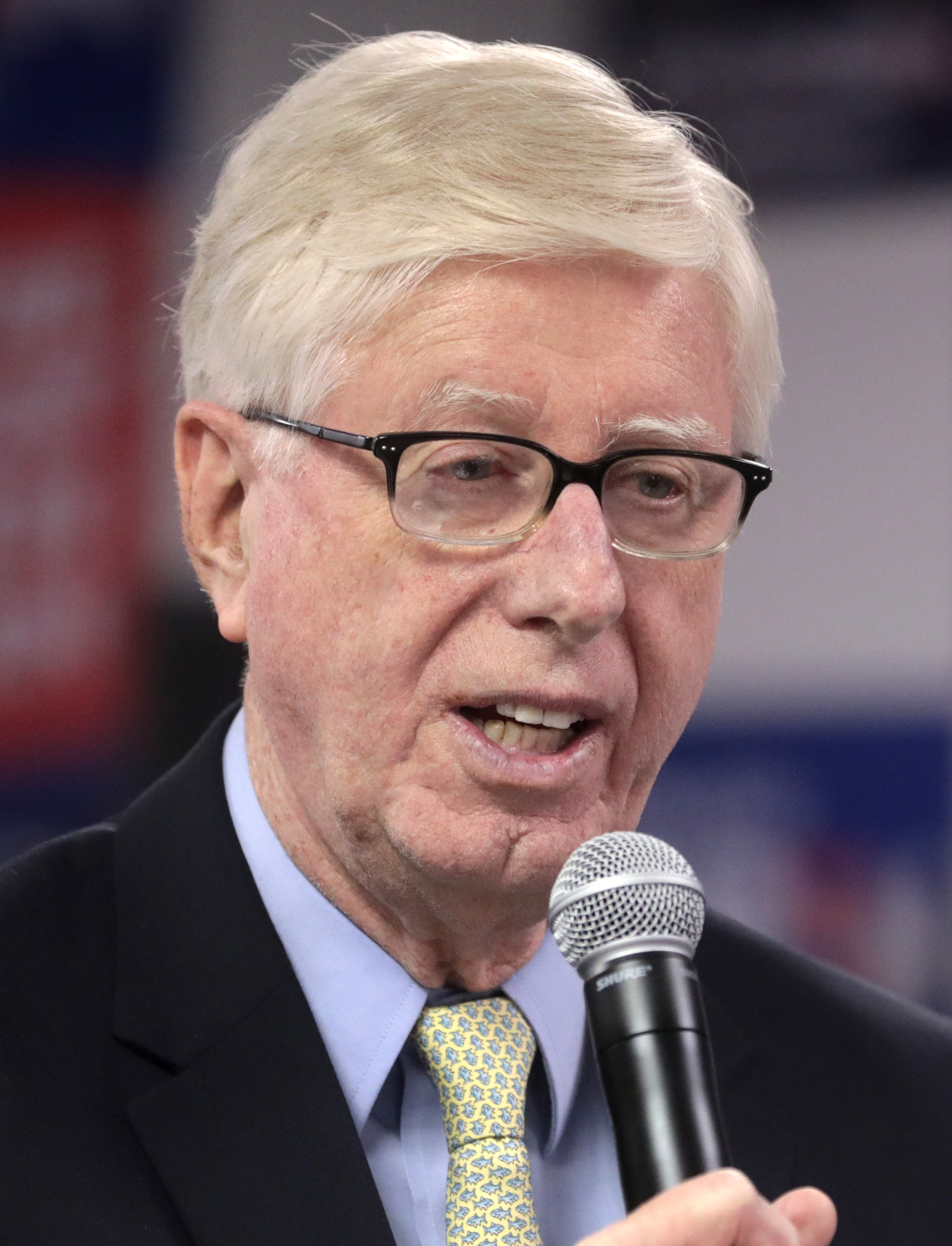
Nominee	Brenna Bird	Tom Miller
Party	Republican	Democratic
Popular vote	611,432	590,890
Percentage	50.9%	49.1%
- County results Bird: 50–60% 60–70% 70–80% 80–90% Miller: 50–60% 60–70% 70–80%
Attorney General before election
Tom Miller
Democratic
Elected Attorney General
Brenna Bird
Republican

Incumbent Democrat Tom Miller ran for re-election and lost to Republican Brenna Bird. Brenna Bird was the County Attorney of Guthrie County and Republican nominee for attorney general in 2010.

Miller and Bird won their respective primaries on June 7. Bird narrowly defeated Miller by a margin of 1.8%.

== Kansas ==
Kansas Attorney General election
- November 8, 2022
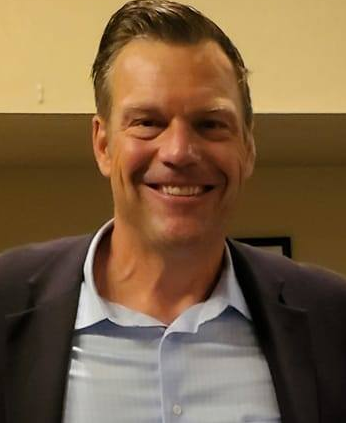

Nominee	Kris Kobach	Chris Mann
Party	Republican	Democratic
Popular vote	506,817	490,925
Percentage	50.8%	49.2%
- County results Kobach: 50–60% 60–70% 70–80% 80–90% Mann: 50–60% 60–70% 70–80%
Attorney General before election
Derek Schmidt
Republican
Elected Attorney General
Kris Kobach
Republican

Incumbent Republican Derek Schmidt retired to run for Governor.

The Republican candidates included former Kansas Secretary of State and 2018 gubernatorial nominee Kris Kobach, former federal prosecutor Tony Mattivi, and state senator Kellie Warren.

The only Democratic candidate was attorney Chris Mann.

Kobach and Mann won their respective primaries on August 2. In the general election, Kobach narrowly defeated his Democratic challenger Chris Mann by a margin of 1.6%.

== Maryland ==
Maryland Attorney General election
- November 8, 2022
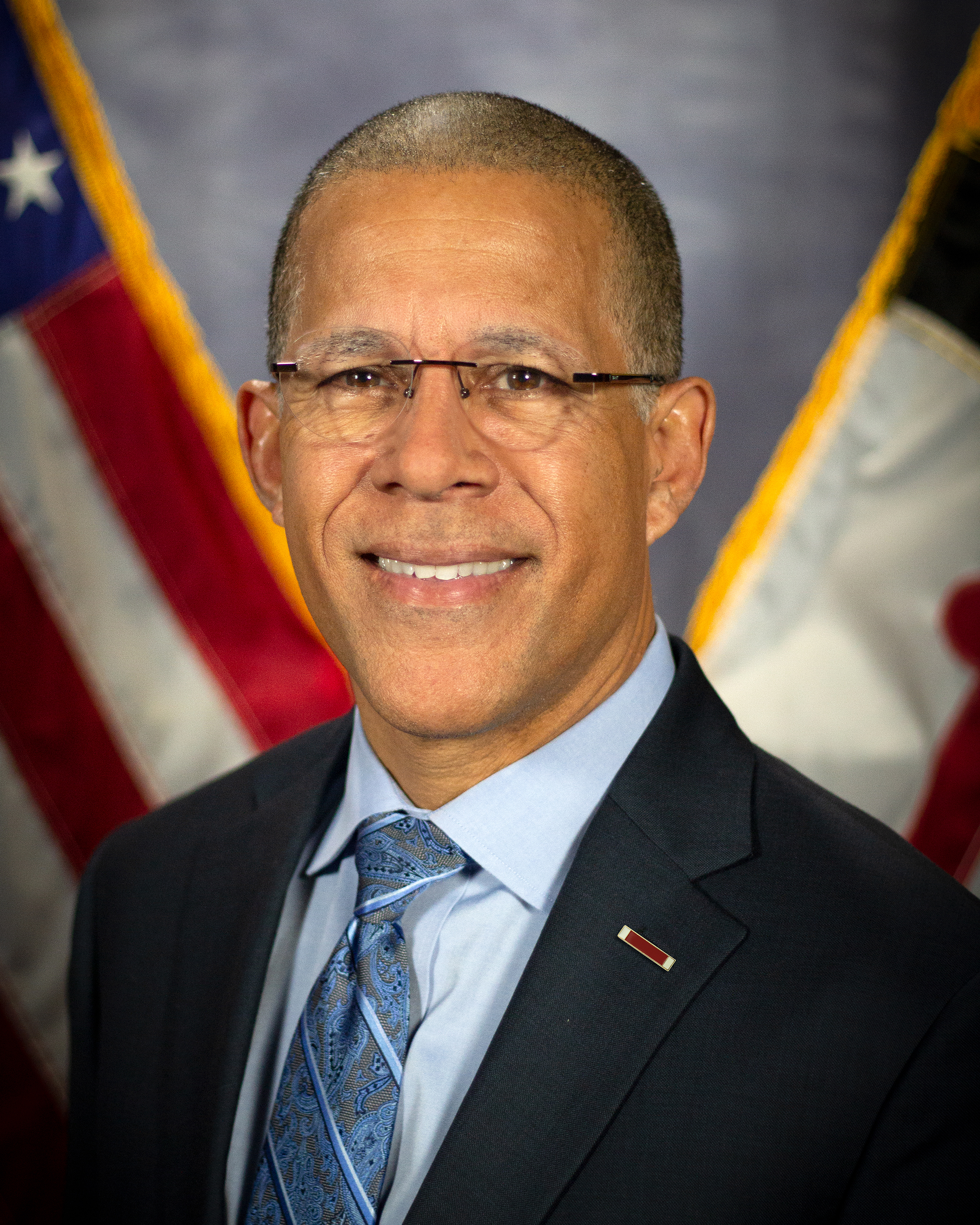

Nominee	Anthony Brown	Michael Peroutka
Party	Democratic	Republican
Popular vote	1,287,418	691,910
Percentage	65.0%	34.9%
- County results Brown: 50–60% 60–70% 70–80% 80–90% >90% Peroutka: 50–60% 60–70% 70–80%
Attorney General of Maryland before election
Brian Frosh
Democratic
Elected Attorney General of Maryland
Anthony Brown
Democratic

Incumbent Democrat Brian Frosh retired.

Democratic candidates included U.S. Representative and former Lt. Governor Anthony Brown and retired judge and former First Lady of Maryland Katie O'Malley.

Republican candidates included former Montgomery County Board of Elections chairman Jim Shalleck and former Anne Arundel County councilmember and 2004 Constitution Party candidate for president Michael Peroutka.

Brown and Peroutka won their respective primaries on July 19.

Brown won the general election.

== Massachusetts ==
Massachusetts Attorney General election
- November 8, 2022
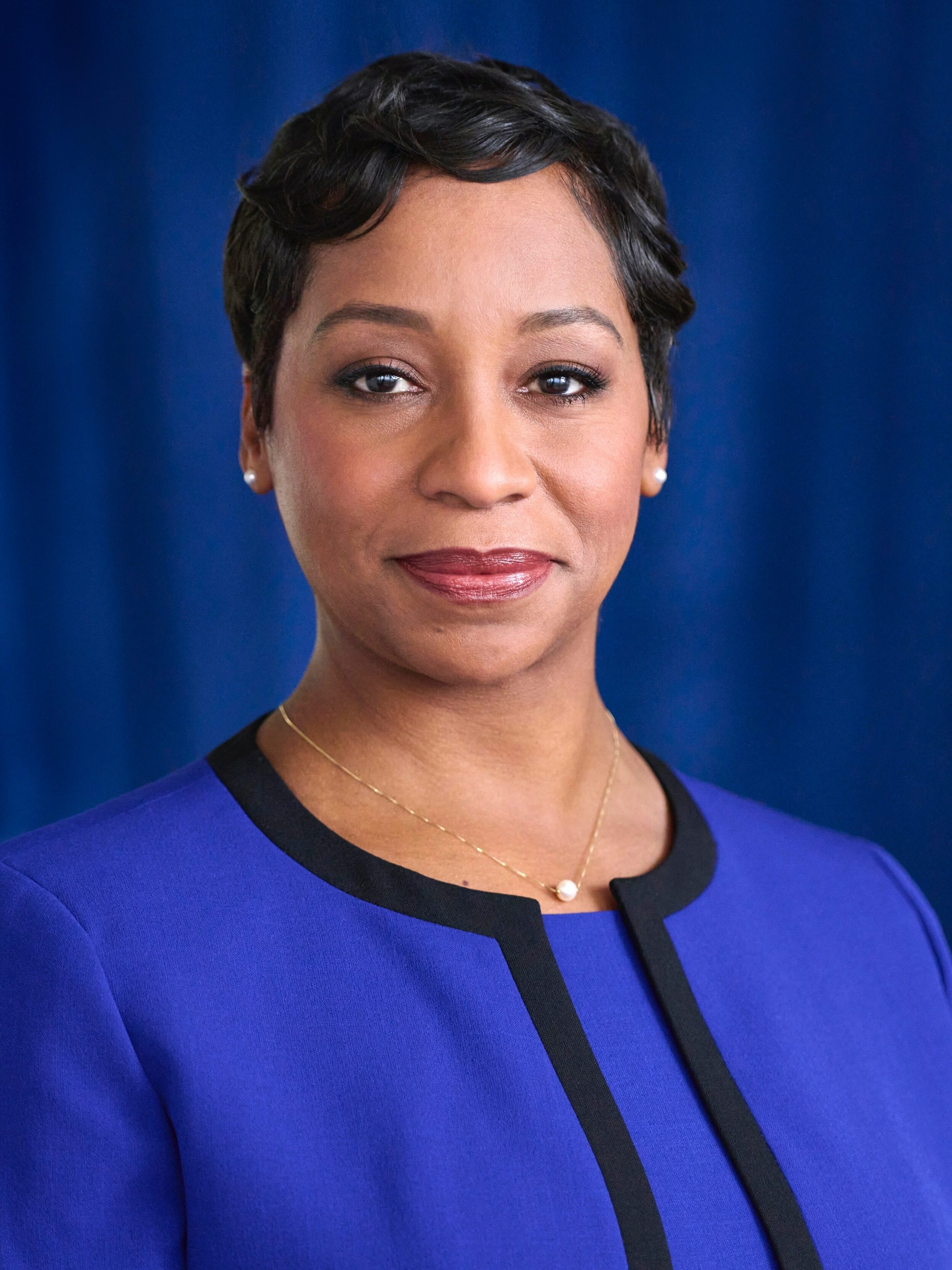

Nominee	Andrea Campbell	Jay McMahon
Party	Democratic	Republican
Popular vote	1,539,624	908,608
Percentage	62.8%	37.1%
- Campbell: 40–50% 50–60% 60–70% 70–80% 80–90% >90% McMahon: 40–50% 50–60% 60–70%
Attorney General before election
Maura Healey
Democratic
Elected Attorney General
Andrea Campbell
Democratic

Incumbent Democrat Maura Healey retired to run for Governor.

The Democratic candidates included former member of the Boston City Council Andrea Campbell, labor attorney and candidate for US Senate in 2020 Shannon Liss-Riordan, and former United States Department of Commerce deputy general counsel Quentin Palfrey.

The only Republican candidate was attorney James McMahon, who was the Republican nominee for attorney general in 2018.

Campbell won the general election.

== Michigan ==
Michigan Attorney General election
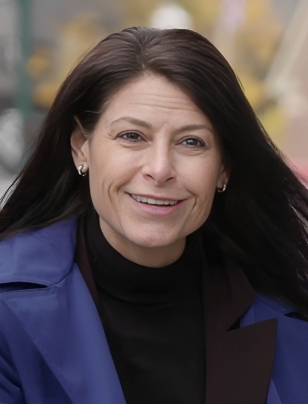

Nominee	Dana Nessel	Matthew DePerno
Party	Democratic	Republican
Popular vote	2,329,195	1,952,408
Percentage	53.2%	44.6%
- County results Nessel: 40–50% 50–60% 60–70% 70–80% DePerno: 40–50% 50–60% 60–70% 70–80%
Attorney General before election
Dana Nessel
Democratic
Elected Attorney General
Dana Nessel
Democratic

Incumbent Democrat Dana Nessel ran for re-election.

The Republican candidates included State Representative Ryan Berman, attorney Matthew DePerno (who has been endorsed by Donald Trump), and former speaker of the Michigan House of Representatives Tom Leonard DePerno won the primary on August 2.

Nessel won re-election in the general election.

== Minnesota ==
Minnesota Attorney General election
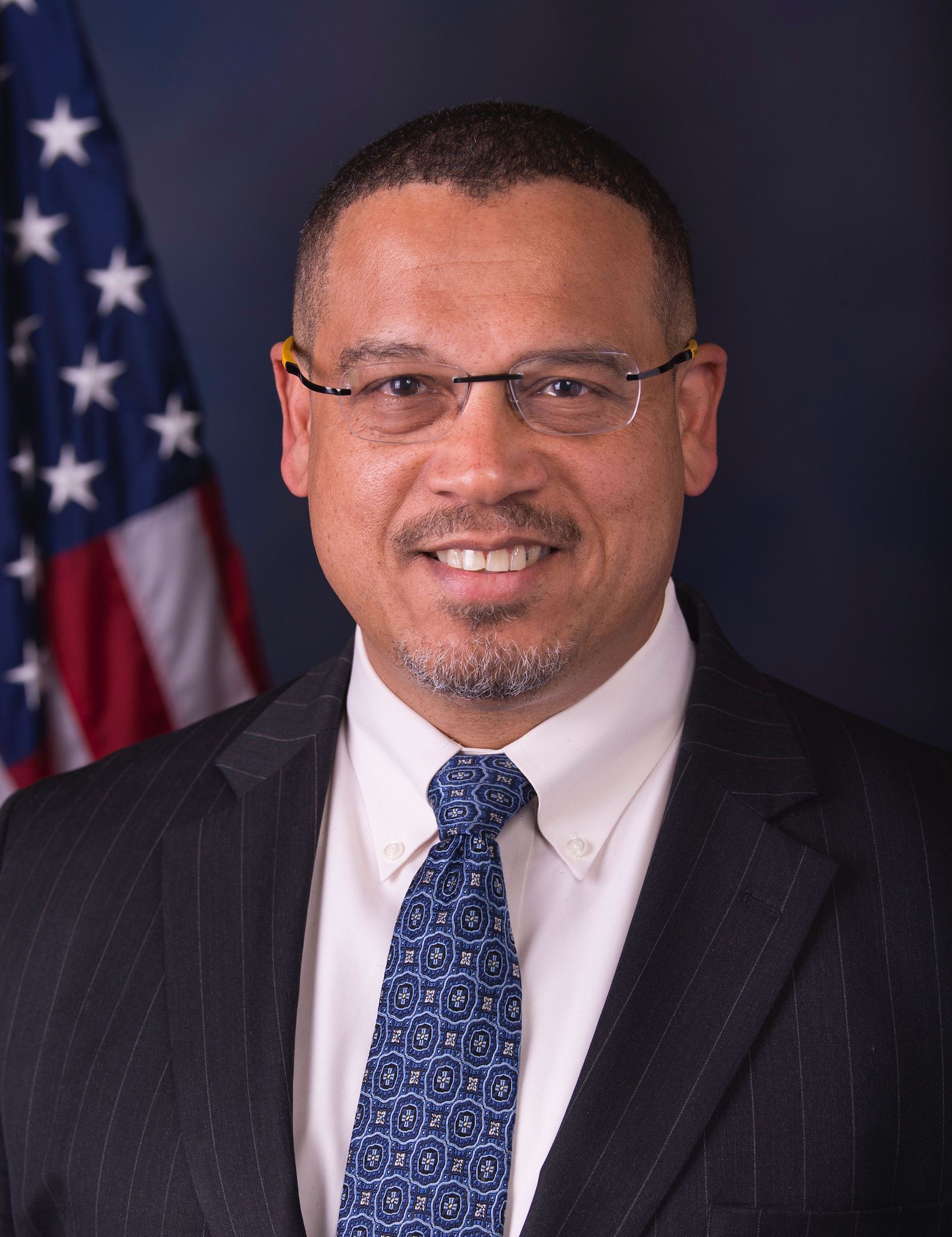

Nominee	Keith Ellison	Jim Schultz
Party	Democratic (DFL)	Republican
Popular vote	1,254,371	1,233,556
Percentage	50.4%	49.6%
- County results Ellison: 50–60% 60–70% 70–80% Schultz: 50–60% 60–70% 70–80%
Attorney General before election
Keith Ellison
Democratic (DFL)
Elected Attorney General
Keith Ellison
Democratic (DFL)

The 2022 Minnesota Attorney General election will be held on November 8, 2022, to elect the attorney general of the U.S. state of Minnesota. Incumbent Democrat Keith Ellison ran for re-election. He faced a primary challenge from Bill Dahn.

The Republican candidates included perennial candidate Sharon Anderson, attorney Jim Schultz, and former state representative Doug Wardlow. Schultz won the August August 9 primary.

Ellison was narrowly re-elected in the general election by a margin of 0.8%.

== Nebraska ==
Nebraska Attorney General election
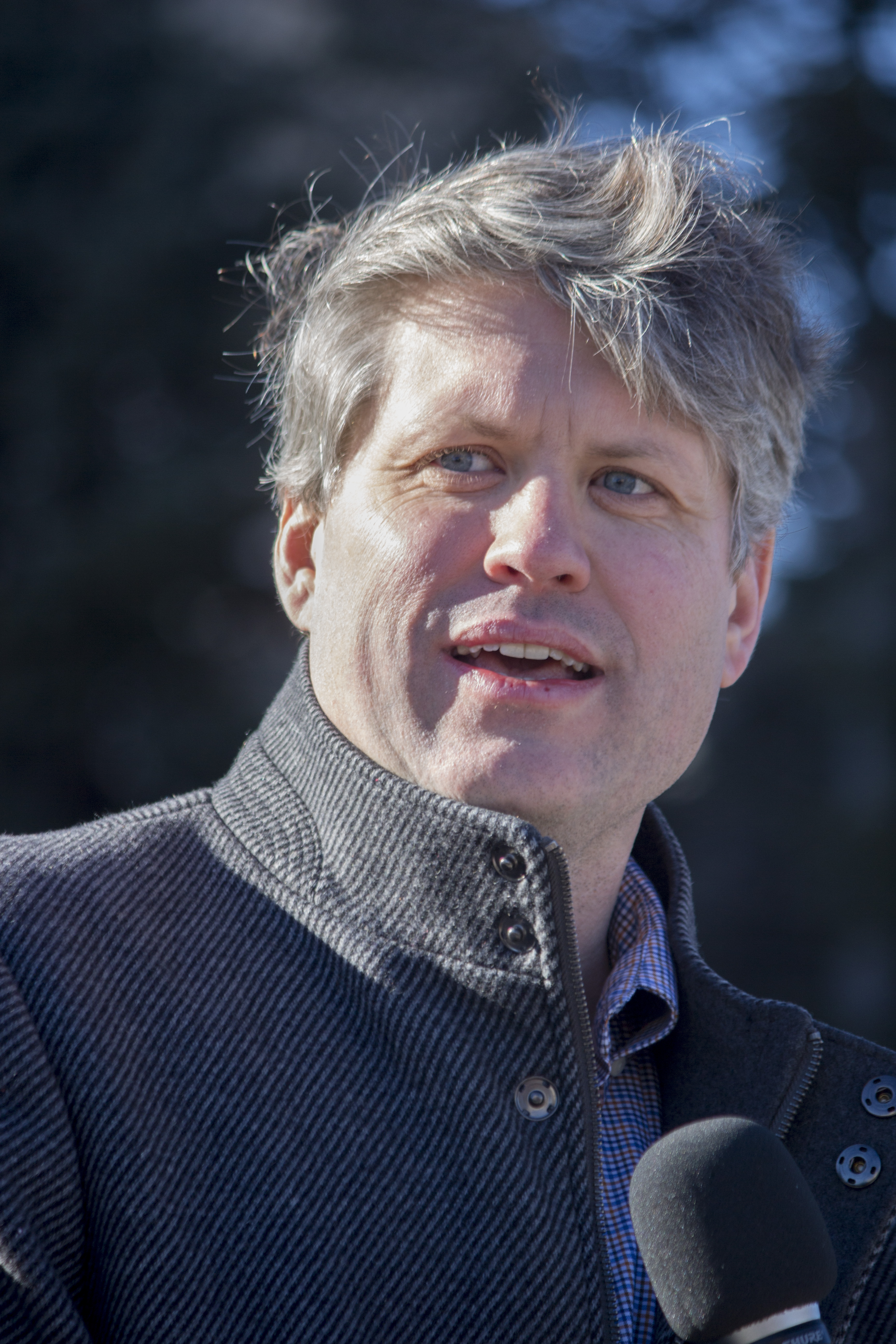

Nominee	Mike Hilgers	Larry Bolinger
Party	Republican	Legal Marijuana Now
Popular vote	434,671	188,649
Percentage	69.7%	30.3%
- County results Hilgers: 50–60% 60–70% 70–80% 80–90% >90%
Attorney General before election
Doug Peterson
Republican
Elected Attorney General
Mike Hilgers
Republican

Incumbent Republican Doug Peterson retired. Republican candidates included Speaker of the Nebraska Legislature Mike Hilgers and Jennifer Hicks.

Lary Bolinger ran as a Legal Marijuana Now candidate.

Hilgers won his primary on May 10. He also won the general election.

== Nevada ==
Nevada Attorney General election
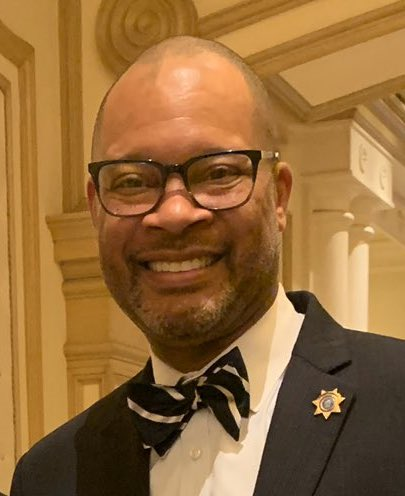

Nominee	Aaron Ford	Sigal Chattah
Party	Democratic	Republican
Popular vote	511,263	434,084
Percentage	52.2%	44.4%
- County results Ford: 40–50% 50–60% Chattah: 50–60% 60–70% 70–80% 80–90%
Attorney General before election
Aaron D. Ford
Democratic
Elected Attorney General
Aaron D. Ford
Democratic

Incumbent Democrat Aaron Ford ran for re-election. He faced a primary challenge from Stuart MacKie. Republican candidates included attorneys Tisha Black and Sigal Chattah. John T. Kennedy was the Libertarian nominee.

Ford and Chattah won their respective primaries on June 14.

Ford won re-election in the general election.

== New Mexico ==
New Mexico Attorney General election
Nominee	Raúl Torrez	Jeremy Gay
Party	Democratic	Republican
Popular vote	388,592	314,023
Percentage	55.3%	44.7%
- County results Torrez: 50–60% 60–70% 70–80% 70–80% Gay: 50–60% 60–70% 70–80% 80–90%
Attorney General before election
Hector Balderas
Democratic
Elected Attorney General
Raúl Torrez
Democratic

Incumbent Democrat Hector Balderas was term-limited and cannot seek re-election.

Democrat candidates included Bernalillo County District Attorney Raúl Torrez, and New Mexico State Auditor Brian Colón.

Marine veteran Jeremy Gay was the only Republican candidate.

Torrez and Gay won their respective primaries on June 7.

Torrez won the general election.

== New York ==
New York Attorney General election
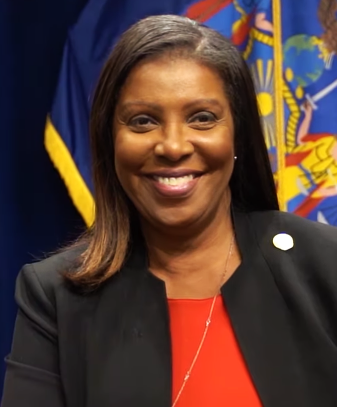

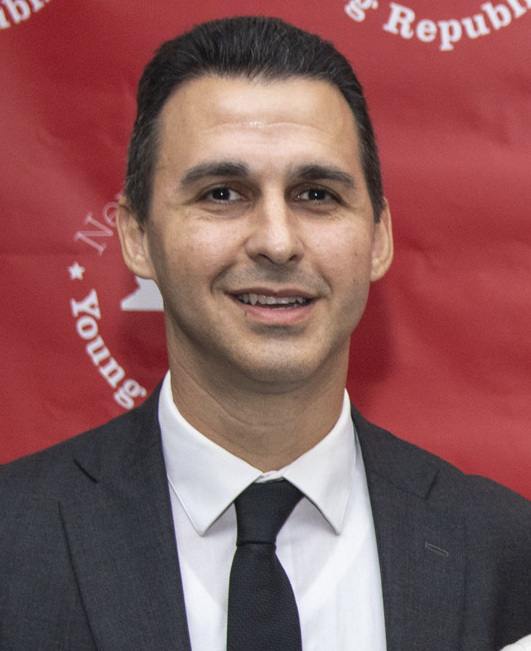
Nominee	Letitia James	Michael Henry
Party	Democratic	Republican
Popular vote	3,168,256	2,631,301
Percentage	54.6%	45.4%
- County results James: 50–60% 60–70% 70–80% 80–90% Henry: 50–60% 60–70% 70–80%
Attorney General before election
Letitia James
Democratic
Elected Attorney General
Letitia James
Democratic

The 2022 New York Attorney General election took place on November 8, 2022, to elect the attorney general of New York. The incumbent Democratic attorney general Letitia James, who had previously declared to run for governor, switched races and declared her intention to seek re-election. Running against her was Republican attorney Michael Henry. In the general election, James won re-election by under 10%.

James and Henry won their respective primaries on June 28.

== North Dakota ==
North Dakota Attorney General election
- November 8, 2022
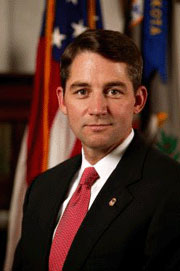

Nominee	Drew Wrigley	Timothy Lamb
Party	Republican	Democratic–NPL
Popular vote	166,059	67,398
Percentage	71.1%	28.9%
- County results Wrigley: 50–60% 60–70% 70–80% 80–90% >90% Lamb: 50–60% 60–70%
Attorney General before election
Drew Wrigley
Republican
Elected Attorney General
Drew Wrigley
Republican

Incumbent Republican Drew Wrigley ran for a full term. His only opponent was Democratic attorney Timothy Lamb. In the general election, Wrigley easily won.

Wrigley and Lamb won their respective primaries on June 14.

== Ohio ==
Ohio Attorney General election
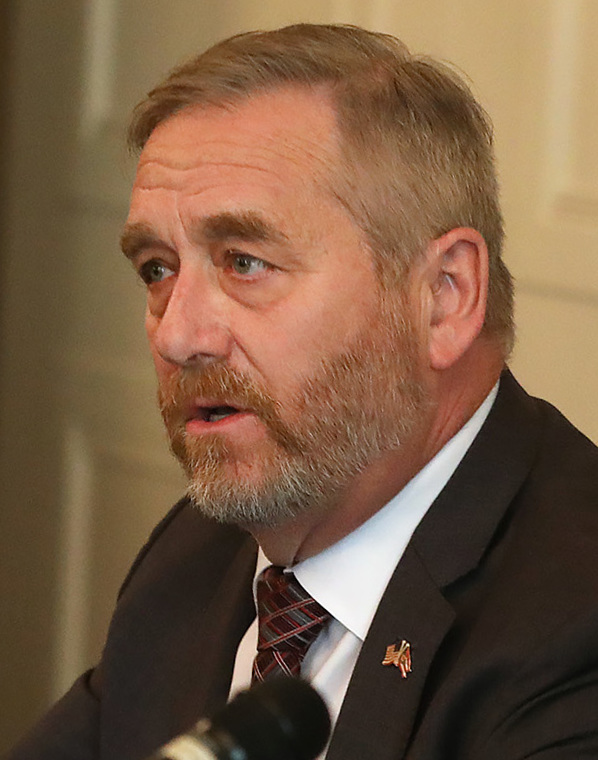
Nominee	Dave Yost	Jeffrey Crossman
Party	Republican	Democratic
Popular vote	2,484,753	1,647,644
Percentage	60.1%	39.9%
- County results Yost: 50-60% 60-70% 70-80% 80-90% Crossman: 50–60% 60–70%
Attorney General before election
Dave Yost
Republican
Elected Attorney General
Dave Yost
Republican

Incumbent Republican Dave Yost ran for re-election. Democratic state representative Jeffrey Crossman ran against him. In the general election, Dave Yost easily won re-election

Yost and Crossman won their respective primaries on May 3.

== Oklahoma ==
Oklahoma Attorney General election
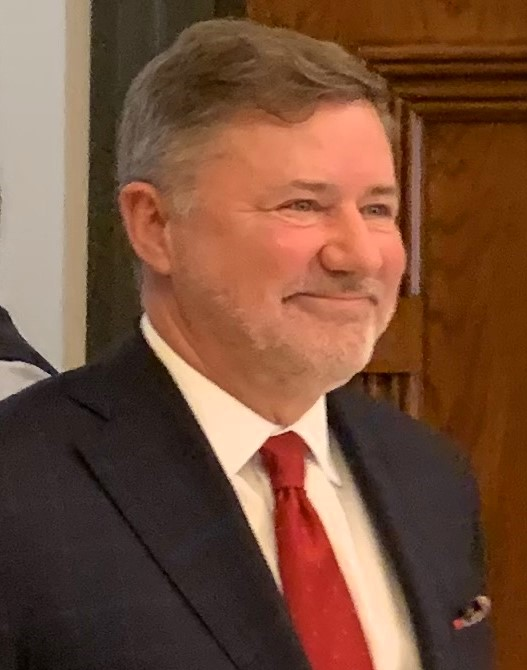

Nominee	Gentner Drummond	Lynda Steele
Party	Republican	Libertarian
Popular vote	792,466	281,923
Percentage	73.8%	26.2%
- County results Drummond: 60–70% 70–80% 80–90% >90%
Attorney General before election
John O'Connor
Republican
Elected Attorney General
Gentner Drummond
Republican

Incumbent Republican John O'Connor ran for a full term. He faced a primary challenge from Tulsa attorney Gentner Drummond. Drummond won his primary on June 28.

No Democrat filed to run for the office. Former Oklahoma Army National Guard officer Lynda Steele ran as a Libertarian.

Drummond won the general election.

== Rhode Island ==
Rhode Island Attorney General election
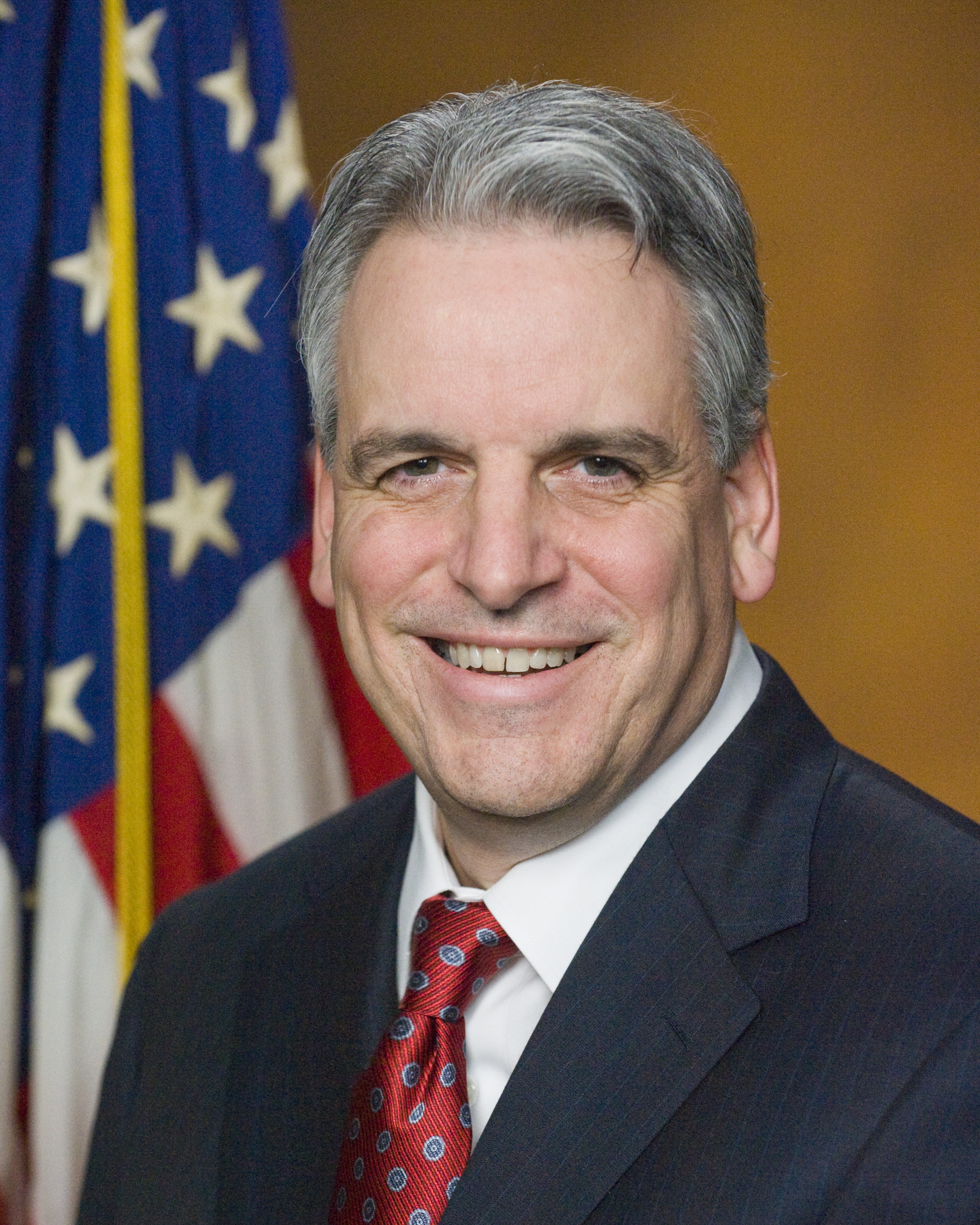

Nominee	Peter Neronha	Charles Calenda
Party	Democratic	Republican
Popular vote	217,066	135,471
Percentage	61.6%	38.4%
- County results Neronha: 50–60% 60–70%
Attorney General before election
Peter Neronha
Democratic
Elected Attorney General
Peter Neronha
Democratic

Incumbent Democrat Peter Neronha ran for re-election. Former state prosecutor Charles "Chas" Calenda ran against him as a Republican. Alan Gordon and Rebecca Lynne McLaughlin are running as independents.

Neronha won re-election in the general election.

== South Carolina ==
South Carolina Attorney General election
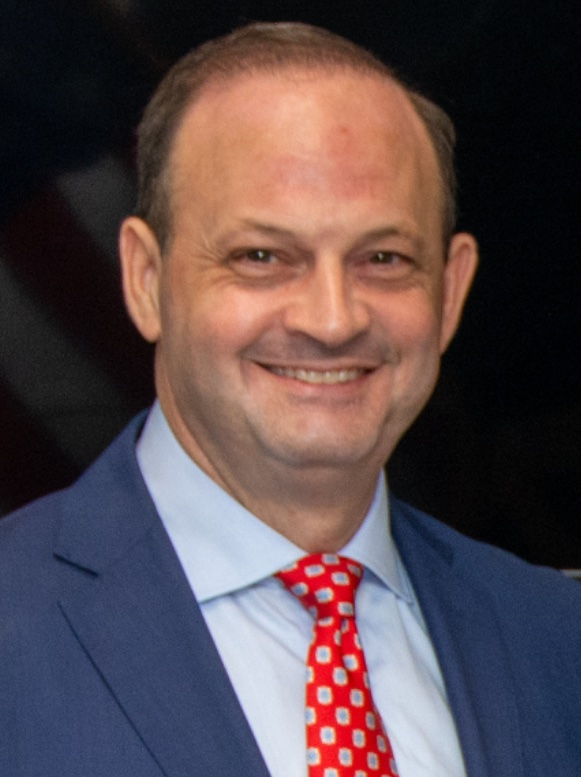
Nominee	Alan Wilson
Party	Republican
Attorney General before election
Alan Wilson
Republican
Elected Attorney General
Alan Wilson
Republican

Incumbent Republican Alan Wilson ran for re-election. Attorney Lauren Martel challenged him in the Republican primary.

Wilson won his primary on June 14. He won re-election in the general election unopposed.

== South Dakota ==
South Dakota Attorney General election
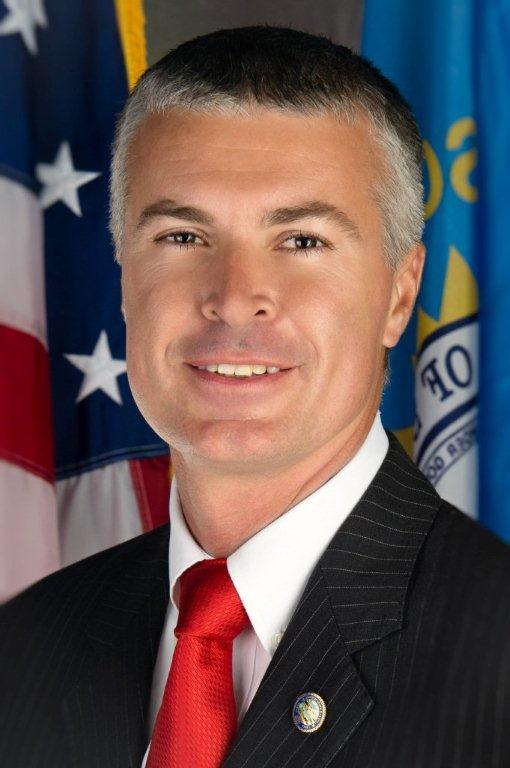
Nominee	Marty Jackley
Party	Republican
Attorney General before election
Mark Vargo
Republican
Elected Attorney General
Marty Jackley
Republican

Incumbent Republican Mark Vargo retired after being appointed to complete the term of Jason Ravnsborg, who was impeached and removed from office.

On September 12, 2020, while driving home from a political fundraiser, Ravnsborg struck and killed a pedestrian, Joseph Boever. He was charged with three misdemeanors related to Boever's death—careless driving, driving out of his lane, and operating a car while using a cell phone. Ravnsborg pleaded no contest to driving out of his lane and operating a car while using a cell phone; the careless driving charge was dismissed. Several high-profile figures called for Ravnsborg's resignation, including Governor Kristi Noem.

Former South Dakota Attorney General Marty Jackley launched a primary challenge to Ravnsborg. South Dakota Division of Criminal Investigation director David Natvig also ran in the Republican primary.

Jackley won the nomination at the Republican state convention on June 25. He won the general election unopposed.

== Texas ==
Texas Attorney General election
- November 8, 2022
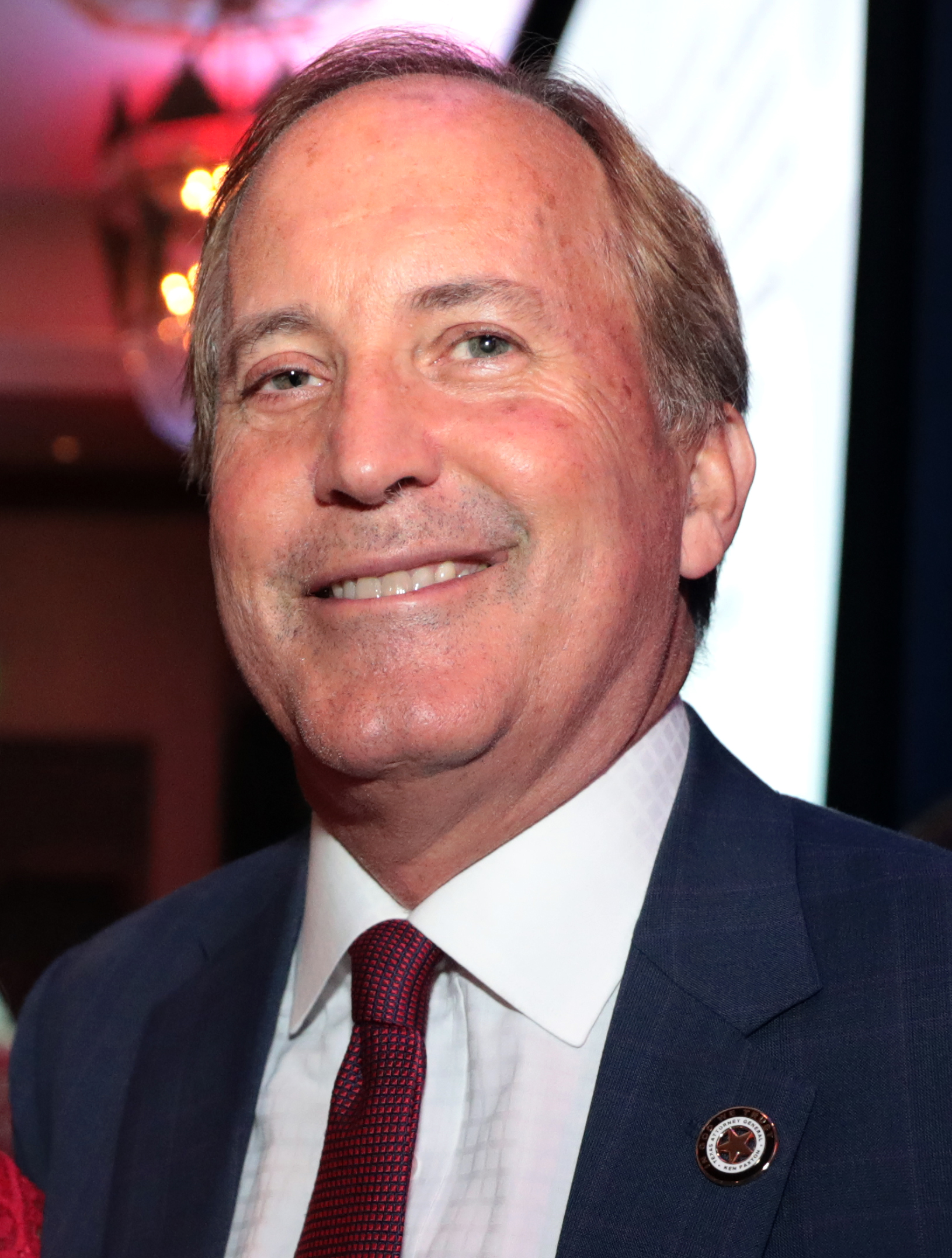

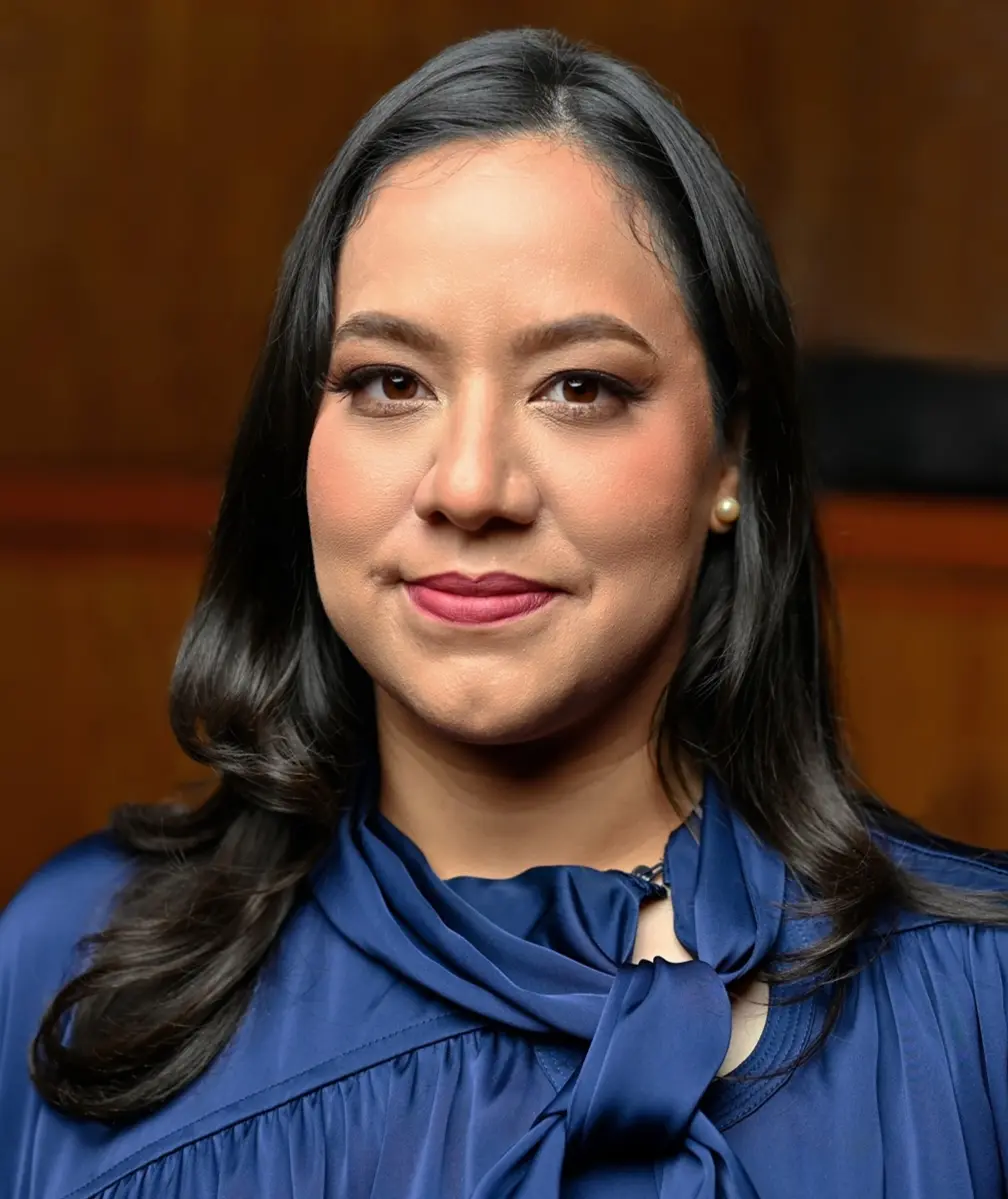
Nominee	Ken Paxton	Rochelle Mercedes Garza
Party	Republican	Democratic
Popular vote	4,268,826	3,482,909
Percentage	53.4%	43.7%
- County results Paxton: 40–50% 50–60% 60–70% 70–80% 80–90% >90% Garza: 40–50% 50–60% 60–70% 70–80%
Attorney General before election
Ken Paxton
Republican
Elected Attorney General
Ken Paxton
Republican

Incumbent Republican Ken Paxton won re-election to a third term. Texas does not have term limits.

Citing allegations of corruption against Paxton, Texas Land Commissioner George P. Bush has announced a primary challenge against him. Former Texas Supreme Court Justice Eva Guzman also announced a challenge to Paxton.

Paxton and Garza won their respective runoffs on May 24.

== Vermont ==
Vermont Attorney General election
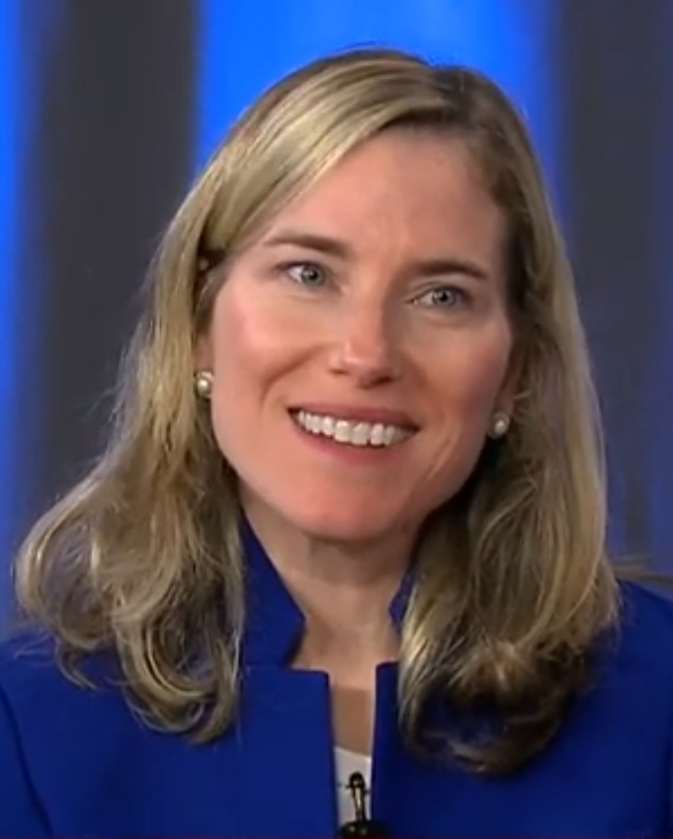

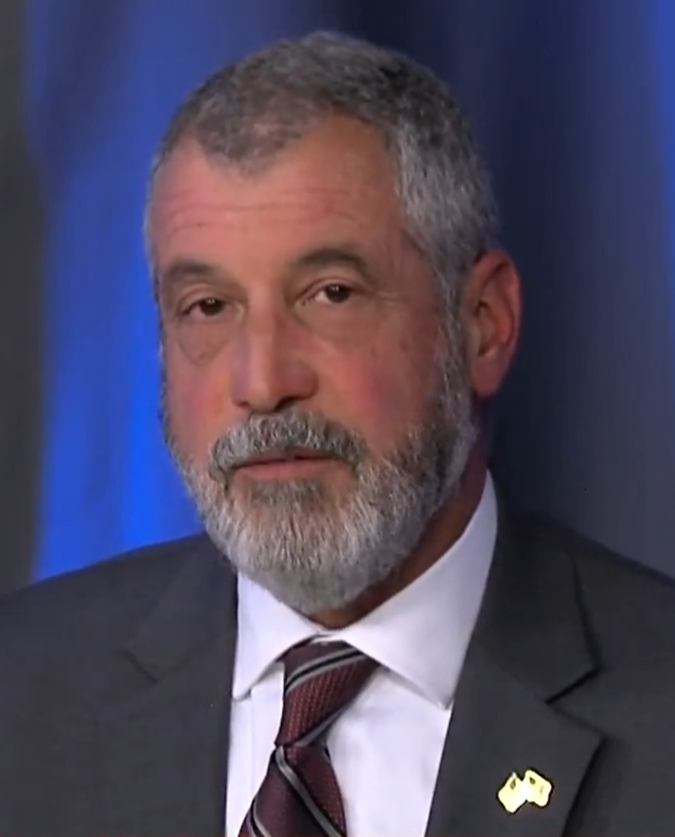
Nominee	Charity Clark	Mike Tagliavia
Party	Democratic	Republican
Popular vote	179,098	95,661
Percentage	61.3%	32.8%
- County results Clark: 50–60% 60–70% 70–80% Tagliavia: 50–60%
Attorney General before election
Susanne Young
Republican
Elected Attorney General
Charity Clark
Democratic

Incumbent Republican Susanne Young retired after being appointed to complete the unexpired term of T. J. Donovan. Democratic primary candidates included Donovan's former chief of staff Charity Clark and Washington County prosecutor Rory Thibault. Clark won the primary on August 9.

The only Republican candidate is perennial candidate H. Brooke Paige. Paige dropped out of the race on August 19 and was replaced by Mike Tagliavia.

Elijah Bergman ran as the candidate of the Vermont Progressive Party.

Clark won the general election.

== Wisconsin ==
Wisconsin Attorney General election
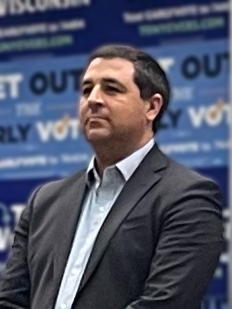

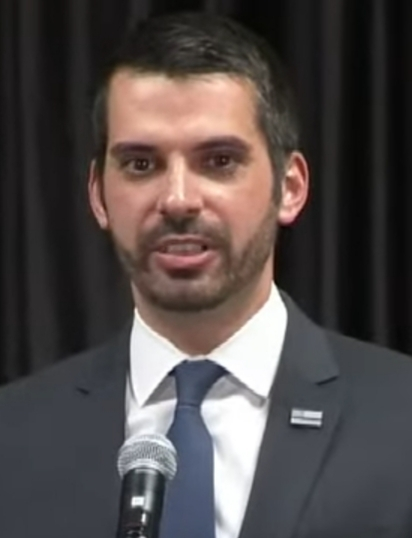
Nominee	Josh Kaul	Eric Toney
Party	Democratic	Republican
Popular vote	1,333,369	1,298,369
Percentage	50.6%	49.3%
- County results Kaul: 50–60% 70–80% Toney: 50–60% 60–70% 70–80%
Attorney General before election
Josh Kaul
Democratic
Elected Attorney General
Josh Kaul
Democratic

Incumbent Democrat Josh Kaul ran for re-election.

The Republican primary candidates included former state assemblyman Adam Jarchow, Chippewa Falls attorney Karen Mueller, and Fond du Lac County prosecutor Eric Toney. Toney won the Republican primary on August 9.

Libertarian Matthew Bughman also ran.

Kaul narrowly won re-election by a margin of 1.3%.

== See also ==
- 2021 Virginia Attorney General election
- 2022 United States elections
