= 2022 Alabama Attorney General election =

- November 8, 2022
- Turnout: 38.5% ▼
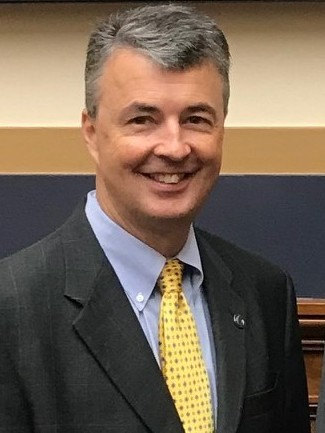

Nominee	Steve Marshall	Wendell Major
Party	Republican	Democratic
Popular vote	955,425	450,543
Percentage	67.90%	32.02%
- Marshall: 50–60% 60–70% 70–80% 80–90% >90% Major: 50–60% 60–70% 70–80% 80–90% >90% Tie: 50% No data
Attorney General before election
Steve Marshall
Republican
Elected Attorney General
Steve Marshall
Republican

The 2022 Alabama Attorney General election took place on November 8, 2022, to elect the Attorney General of Alabama. Incumbent Republican Attorney General Steve Marshall won re-election to a second term.

== Republican primary ==
=== Candidates ===
==== Nominee ====
- Steve Marshall, incumbent attorney general (2017–present)

==== Eliminated in primary ====
- Harry Bartlett Still III, attorney and former county manager

=== Endorsements ===
Steve Marshall

Organizations

- Alabama Association of Realtors
- Alabama Farmers Federation
- Alabama Forestry Association
- Alabama Retail Association
- Coastal 150
- League of Southeastern Credit Unions
- Manufacture Alabama

PACs

- Alabama RetailPAC

=== Results ===
Results by county: Marshall: 80–90%; 90–100%

Results by precinct: Marshall: 50–60%; 60–70%; 70–80%; 80–90%; >90%; Still: 50–60%; 60–70%; >90%; Tie: 50%; No votes

Republican primary results
Party	Candidate	Votes	%
Republican	Steve Marshall (incumbent)	519,092	89.9
Republican	Harry Bartlett Still III	58,499	10.1
Total votes		577,591	100.0

== Democratic primary ==
=== Candidates ===
==== Nominee ====
- Wendell Major, police chief of Tarrant, Alabama (2021–present)

== General election ==
=== Predictions ===
Source	Ranking	As of
Sabato's Crystal Ball	Safe R	September 14, 2022
Elections Daily	Safe R	November 1, 2022

=== Post-primary endorsements ===
Wendell Major (D)

Labor unions

- Alabama AFL–CIO
- United Mine Workers of America

=== Results ===
2022 Alabama Attorney General election
Party	Candidate	Votes	%	±%
Republican	Steve Marshall (incumbent)	955,425	67.90%	+9.11%
Democratic	Wendell Major	450,543	32.02%	−9.12%
Write-in		1,220	0.09%	+0.02%
Total votes		1,407,188	100.00%	N/A
Republican hold				

==== By county ====
County	Steve Marshall Republican		Wendell Major Democratic		Write-in Various		Margin		Total
County	#	%	#	%	#	%	#	%	Total
Autauga	13,648	77.29%	3,985	22.57%	26	0.15%	9,663	54.72%	17,659
Baldwin	60,203	82.79%	12,448	17.12%	64	0.09%	47,755	65.67%	72,715
Barbour	3,850	59.21%	2,652	40.79%	0	0.00%	1,198	18.43%	6,502
Bibb	4,831	82.64%	1,010	17.28%	5	0.09%	3,821	65.36%	5,846
Blount	15,386	92.98%	1,149	6.94%	12	0.07%	14,237	86.04%	16,547
Bullock	795	30.17%	1,840	69.83%	0	0.00%	-1,045	-39.66%	2,635
Butler	3,836	65.05%	2,060	34.93%	1	0.02%	1,776	30.12%	5,897
Calhoun	22,426	74.81%	7,521	25.09%	29	0.10%	14,905	49.72%	29,976
Chambers	5,971	65.92%	3,079	33.99%	8	0.09%	2,892	31.93%	9,058
Cherokee	7,023	89.90%	786	10.06%	3	0.04%	6,237	79.84%	7,812
Chilton	10,729	88.25%	1,423	11.70%	6	0.05%	9,306	76.54%	12,158
Choctaw	3,120	61.57%	1,944	38.37%	3	0.06%	1,176	23.21%	5,067
Clarke	5,296	59.00%	3,678	40.97%	3	0.03%	1,618	18.02%	8,977
Clay	3,690	87.44%	523	12.39%	7	0.17%	3,167	75.05%	4,220
Cleburne	4,248	92.87%	326	7.13%	0	0.00%	3,922	85.75%	4,574
Coffee	11,458	82.39%	2,443	17.57%	6	0.04%	9,015	64.82%	13,907
Colbert	12,904	75.26%	4,226	24.65%	15	0.09%	8,678	50.62%	17,145
Conecuh	2,563	57.93%	1,860	42.04%	1	0.02%	703	15.89%	4,424
Coosa	2,726	71.60%	1,076	28.26%	5	0.13%	1,650	43.34%	3,807
Covington	9,876	87.98%	1,344	11.97%	5	0.04%	8,532	76.01%	11,225
Crenshaw	3,623	79.68%	921	20.26%	3	0.07%	2,702	59.42%	4,547
Cullman	23,985	92.13%	2,035	7.82%	13	0.05%	21,950	84.32%	26,033
Dale	9,472	79.32%	2,454	20.55%	15	0.13%	7,018	58.77%	11,941
Dallas	3,953	35.05%	7,316	64.87%	9	0.08%	-3,363	-29.82%	11,278
DeKalb	15,317	89.75%	1,738	10.18%	11	0.06%	13,579	79.57%	17,066
Elmore	20,615	80.28%	5,048	19.66%	17	0.07%	15,567	60.62%	25,680
Escambia	7,287	75.85%	2,318	24.13%	2	0.02%	4,969	51.72%	9,607
Etowah	20,906	80.41%	5,074	19.52%	19	0.07%	15,832	60.89%	25,999
Fayette	4,794	87.50%	684	12.48%	1	0.02%	4,110	75.01%	5,479
Franklin	6,563	89.09%	800	10.86%	4	0.05%	5,763	78.23%	7,367
Geneva	7,104	89.55%	828	10.44%	1	0.01%	6,276	79.11%	7,933
Greene	613	20.67%	2,351	79.27%	2	0.07%	-1,738	-58.60%	2,966
Hale	2,315	45.00%	2,830	55.00%	0	0.00%	-515	-10.01%	5,145
Henry	5,028	75.43%	1,633	24.50%	5	0.08%	3,395	50.93%	6,666
Houston	21,293	77.50%	6,149	22.38%	33	0.12%	15,144	55.12%	27,475
Jackson	11,694	87.90%	1,601	12.03%	8	0.06%	10,093	75.87%	13,303
Jefferson	93,423	47.45%	103,295	52.46%	183	0.09%	-9,872	-5.01%	196,901
Lamar	3,916	89.94%	435	9.99%	3	0.07%	3,481	79.95%	4,354
Lauderdale	20,208	78.46%	5,526	21.45%	23	0.09%	14,682	57.00%	25,757
Lawrence	8,682	81.39%	1,977	18.53%	8	0.07%	6,705	62.86%	10,667
Lee	27,060	67.24%	13,145	32.67%	36	0.09%	13,915	34.58%	40,241
Limestone	23,587	75.84%	7,486	24.07%	28	0.09%	16,101	51.77%	31,101
Lowndes	1,334	33.15%	2,690	66.85%	0	0.00%	-1,356	-33.70%	4,024
Macon	1,168	21.85%	4,174	78.08%	4	0.07%	-3,006	-56.23%	5,346
Madison	71,367	59.69%	48,060	40.20%	132	0.11%	23,307	19.49%	119,559
Marengo	3,806	52.79%	3,401	47.17%	3	0.04%	405	5.62%	7,210
Marion	7,763	92.73%	603	7.20%	6	0.07%	7,160	85.52%	8,372
Marshall	21,616	89.37%	2,551	10.55%	21	0.09%	19,065	78.82%	24,188
Mobile	64,716	60.77%	41,652	39.11%	128	0.12%	23,064	21.66%	106,496
Monroe	4,271	61.10%	2,715	38.84%	4	0.06%	1,556	22.26%	6,990
Montgomery	22,968	39.93%	34,470	59.93%	77	0.13%	-11,502	-20.00%	57,515
Morgan	25,779	80.68%	6,147	19.24%	26	0.08%	19,632	61.44%	31,952
Perry	915	28.93%	2,247	71.04%	1	0.03%	-1,332	-42.11%	3,163
Pickens	4,259	65.22%	2,270	34.76%	1	0.02%	1,989	30.46%	6,530
Pike	5,343	66.04%	2,745	33.93%	2	0.02%	2,598	32.11%	8,090
Randolph	5,531	84.60%	1,003	15.34%	4	0.06%	4,528	69.26%	6,538
Russell	6,008	52.32%	5,465	47.59%	11	0.10%	543	4.73%	11,484
Shelby	52,462	75.38%	17,062	24.52%	74	0.11%	35,400	50.86%	69,598
St. Clair	23,720	85.34%	4,056	14.59%	19	0.07%	19,664	70.75%	27,795
Sumter	1,150	29.77%	2,713	70.23%	0	0.00%	-1,563	-40.46%	3,863
Talladega	14,579	67.53%	6,992	32.39%	17	0.08%	7,587	35.14%	21,588
Tallapoosa	10,537	77.90%	2,980	22.03%	10	0.07%	7,557	55.87%	13,527
Tuscaloosa	32,207	62.65%	19,157	37.26%	44	0.09%	13,050	25.39%	51,408
Walker	15,595	87.74%	2,174	12.23%	6	0.03%	13,421	75.50%	17,775
Washington	4,491	77.10%	1,333	22.88%	1	0.02%	3,158	54.21%	5,825
Wilcox	1,355	35.64%	2,446	64.33%	1	0.03%	-1,091	-28.70%	3,802
Winston	6,468	93.83%	420	6.09%	5	0.07%	6,048	87.74%	6,893
Totals	955,425	67.90%	450,543	32.02%	1,220	0.09%	504,882	35.88%	1,407,188

==== Counties that flipped from Democratic to Republican ====
- Barbour (largest city: Eufaula)
- Conecuh (largest city: Evergreen)
- Marengo (largest city: Demopolis)
- Russell (largest city: Phenix City)

==== By congressional district ====
Marshall won six of seven congressional districts.

District	Marshall	Major	Representative
1st	70%	30%	Jerry Carl
2nd	70%	29%	Barry Moore
3rd	73%	27%	Mike Rogers
4th	86%	14%	Robert Aderholt
5th	69%	31%	Mo Brooks (117th Congress)
5th	69%	31%	Dale Strong (118th Congress)
6th	70%	30%	Gary Palmer
7th	38%	62%	Terri Sewell

== See also ==
- Attorney General of Alabama
- 2022 United States attorney general elections
- 2022 United States House of Representatives elections in Alabama
- 2022 Alabama gubernatorial election
- 2022 Alabama lieutenant gubernatorial election
- 2022 Alabama Senate election
- 2022 Alabama House of Representatives election
- 2022 Alabama elections
