= Steve Marshall =

American lawyer and politician (born 1964)

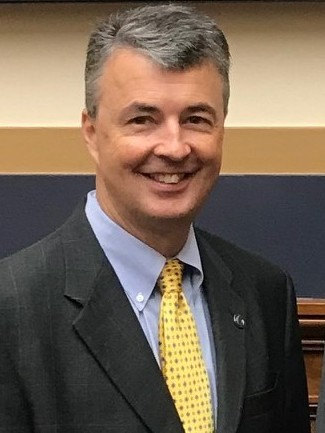
- Marshall in 2018

48th Attorney General of Alabama
- Incumbent
- Assumed office February 10, 2017
- Governor: Robert Bentley; Kay Ivey
- Preceded by: Luther Strange

District Attorney of Marshall County
- In office 2001 – February 17, 2017
- Preceded by: Ronald Thompson
- Succeeded by: Everette Johnson

Personal details
- Born: Steven Troy Marshall; October 26, 1964 (age 61) Atmore, Alabama, U.S.
- Party: Democratic (before 2011); Republican (2011–present)
- Spouse(s): Bridgette Gentry (died 2018) Tammy Pope (m. 2022)
- Children: 4
- Education: University of North Carolina, Chapel Hill (BA); University of Alabama (JD)

Steven Troy Marshall (born October 26, 1964) is an American lawyer serving as the 48th attorney general of Alabama. He was appointed in February 2017 by Governor Robert J. Bentley to fill the vacancy created by previous attorney general Luther Strange's appointment to the United States Senate. He was elected to a full term in 2018, and was re-elected in 2022. He previously served as district attorney in Marshall County for 16 years.

In May 2025, he announced his candidacy for the U.S. Senate in the 2026 election to replace Tommy Tuberville, who is running for governor. He placed third in the Republican primary.

== Early life and education ==
Marshall was born in Atmore, Alabama, the only child of Conrad Marshall, a representative for a sporting goods manufacturer, and Mary Jo Marshall (née' Everette), a secretary. He graduated from Pinecrest High School in Southern Pines, North Carolina, and earned a bachelor's degree in American studies from the University of North Carolina at Chapel Hill in 1987. He then earned a J.D. degree at the University of Alabama School of Law, and was admitted to the Alabama State Bar in 1990.

== Career ==
=== Law ===
Marshall practiced law in Birmingham and Montgomery in the firm of Maynard Cooper and Gale P.C. and then moved to Guntersville where he started the firm of McLaughlin & Marshall. He was district representative for Alabama and Georgia in the American Bar Association. In addition to private practice, he served as a legal analyst for the Alabama House of Representatives, as prosecutor for the Arab and Albertville municipal courts and as municipal attorney for Arab.

=== Marshall County District Attorney ===
In 2001, on the retirement of Ronald Thompson, he was appointed Marshall County District Attorney by Alabama Governor Don Siegelman, the second youngest district attorney in the state at the time. Marshall was unopposed in three subsequent elections. As district attorney, he assisted in passage of the Brody Act, which makes injury to a fetus an offense punishable in addition to any injury to the mother, and of a state law requiring a driver's license for the purchase of ephedrine and pseudoephedrine, ingredients used in manufacturing crystal meth.

In 2011, after serving for ten years as Marshall County district attorney, Marshall officially changed his political party affiliation from the Democratic Party to the Republican Party.

=== Attorney General of Alabama ===
Marshall was appointed Attorney General of Alabama by Governor Robert J. Bentley in February 2017, to fill the vacancy caused by Luther Strange's appointment to the United States Senate. He was elected to a full term in 2018, defeating former attorney general Troy King in a July run-off election.

In August 2017, Birmingham Mayor William A. Bell draped a Confederate memorial with plastic and surrounded it with plywood with the rationale that the county should not glorify such memorials. Marshall sued Bell and the city for violating the Alabama Memorial Preservation Act, which prohibits the "relocation, removal, alteration, or other disturbance of any monument on public property that has been in place for 40 years or more".

In July 2017, Marshall and others joined an effort led by Texas Attorney General Ken Paxton promising legal action if the President Donald Trump administration did not terminate the Deferred Action for Childhood Arrivals (DACA) policy that had been put into place by President Barack Obama. Tennessee attorney general Herbert Slatery subsequently reversed Marshall's position.

In 2018, Marshall's opponent, Troy King, accused him of violating campaign finance laws by accepting money from a banned political action committee. Marshall's campaign denied any wrongdoing and said King's allegations were a "desperate ploy from a flailing campaign."

As of 2018 Marshall is co-chair of Alabama governor Kay Ivey's Opioid Overdose and Addiction Council.

In 2019, Marshall and 16 other attorneys general did not support the Secure and Fair Enforcement (SAFE) Banking Act (H.R. 1595), sponsored by U.S. representative Ed Perlmutter (D-Colo.), which would permit marijuana-related businesses in states and territories to use the banking system.

In June 2020, Marshall threatened to prosecute the city of Mobile and levy a $25,000 fine for removing a Statue of Raphael Semmes during George Floyd protests, if the removal became permanent.

In October 2020, Marshall successfully led a challenge to the Supreme Court of the United States which struck down a federal court-order allowing curbside voting in Alabama as an accommodation for voters worried about contracting COVID-19.

Marshall declined to throw out the conviction of death row inmate Toforest Johnson, after Johnson's supporters claimed weaknesses in the case against him. A Jefferson County conviction integrity unit flagged Johnson's case, leading the county's district attorney to recommend that Johnson be given a new trial. Former Alabama Supreme Court Chief Justice Drayton Nabers Jr. and former Alabama Attorney General Bill Baxley called for throwing out the conviction.

In March 2022, Marshall created controversy by refusing to acknowledge Joe Biden as the "duly elected and lawfully serving" President of the United States during the Senate confirmation hearings on the nomination of Ketanji Brown Jackson to the Supreme Court.

In August 2023, Marshall argued that people or groups who assist a woman in leaving the state for purposes of obtaining an abortion could be legally prosecuted. His office wrote in a court filing that, “[a]n elective abortion performed in Alabama would be a criminal offense; thus, a conspiracy formed in the State to have that same act performed outside the State is illegal.”

Following a 2024 ruling from the Alabama Supreme Court that frozen embryos could be considered children, Marshall issued a statement in February that he had no intentions of prosecuting healthcare facilities or families involved with in vitro fertilization.

==== Bombing ====
On February 25, 2024, an improvised explosive device was detonated outside of Marshall's office in Montgomery. No one was harmed in the event. According to the FBI, the "device was used as a weapon against property and/or to cause injury/death". Prosecutors stated that the explosive contained a "substantial number of nails and other shrapnel to increase its destructive capability".

A 26-year-old man from Irondale, Alabama was later arrested and charged in connection with the bombing. Prosecutors stated that prior to the bombing, the suspect had been spotted placing stickers on government buildings, displaying "antifa, anti-police and anti-Immigration and Customs Enforcement sentiments" and had expressed "belief that violence should be directed against the government". The man was sentenced to nine years in prison in November 2024.

=== Rule of Law Defense Fund ===
Marshall leads the Rule of Law Defense Fund, a nonprofit organization active since 2014, which is affiliated with the Republican Attorneys General Association.

The Rule of Law Defense Fund, helped organized protests supporting President Donald Trump on January 6, 2021, which claimed election fraud or irregularities, and sought to overturn the 2020 election which Trump lost to Joe Biden. The protests preceded riots at the U.S. Capitol. Marshall issued a statement condemning violence at the Capitol on January 6.

== Personal life ==
Marshall is an elder at LifePoint Church in Albertville and has participated in missionary work in India. He was married to Bridgette Gentry Marshall, and they had one daughter together. Bridgette Marshall died by suicide on June 24, 2018, after "a long struggle with mental illness" and addictions. In 2022 he married Tammy Pope and together they share three children: Faith Marshall, John Millan Gaston and Benen Gaston.

Party political offices
Preceded by Luther Strange	Republican nominee for Attorney General of Alabama; 2018, 2022	Succeeded by Katherine Robertson
Legal offices
Preceded by Luther Strange	Attorney General of Alabama; 2017–present	Incumbent
