= 2018 Alabama Attorney General election =

- November 6, 2018
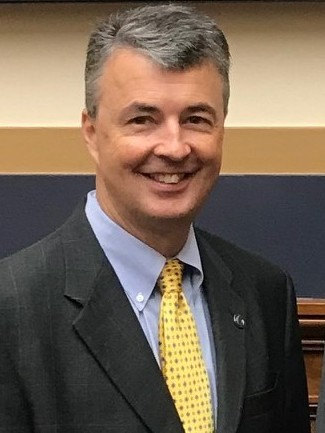

Nominee	Steve Marshall	Joseph Siegelman
Party	Republican	Democratic
Popular vote	1,004,438	702,858
Percentage	58.79%	41.14%
- Marshall: 50–60% 60–70% 70–80% 80–90% >90% Siegelman: 50–60% 60–70% 70–80% 80–90% >90% Tie: 50%
Attorney General before election
Steve Marshall
Republican
Elected Attorney General
Steve Marshall
Republican

The 2018 Alabama Attorney General election took place on November 6, 2018, to elect the attorney general of Alabama. Incumbent attorney general Steve Marshall, who was appointed by former Governor Robert J. Bentley defeated the Democratic candidate, Joseph Siegelman, the son of former Governor Don Siegelman.

== Democratic primary ==
Attorney Joseph Siegelman, son of former governor Don Siegelman, was the nominee of the Democratic Party.

Chris Christie ran for attorney general on the Democratic ballot. He had been a trial lawyer at Bradley Arant Boult Cummings for 30 years.

=== Candidates ===
- Chris Christie, attorney.
- Joseph Siegelman, attorney and son of former governor Don Siegelman.

=== Primary results ===
Democratic primary results
Party	Candidate	Votes	%
Democratic	Joseph Siegelman	147,923	54.16
Democratic	Chris Christie	125,184	45.84
Total votes		273,107	100

== Republican primary ==
Former Alabama Attorney General Troy King unsuccessfully sought the Republican nomination.

Incumbent Republican attorney general Steve Marshall, who was appointed by Governor Bentley in February 2017 after appointing Attorney General Luther Strange to the U.S. Senate, ran for a first full term.

Former chief deputy attorney general Alice Martin sought the Republican nomination.

- Chess Bedsole, criminal court judge and chairman of Donald Trump's Alabama campaign.
- Troy King, former Alabama Attorney General.
- Steve Marshall, incumbent.
- Alice Martin, Deputy Attorney General of Alabama and former U.S. Attorney for the Northern District of Alabama

=== Primary results ===
Republican primary results
Party	Candidate	Votes	%
Republican	Steve Marshall (incumbent)	154,500	28.34
Republican	Troy King	151,878	27.86
Republican	Alice Martin	126,735	23.25
Republican	Chess Bedsole	112,062	20.55
Total votes		545,175	100

=== Runoff results ===
Republican primary runoff results
Party	Candidate	Votes	%
Republican	Steve Marshall (incumbent)	211,851	62.05
Republican	Troy King	129,594	37.95
Total votes		341,445	100

== General election ==
=== Predictions ===
Source	Ranking	As of
Governing	Safe R	October 26, 2018

=== Polling ===
Poll source	Date(s) administered	Sample size	Margin of error	Steve Marshall (R)	Joseph Siegelman (D)	Undecided
Cygnal (R)	July 24–25, 2018	1,027	± 3.1%	55%	42%	4%

=== Results ===
2018 Alabama Attorney General election
Party	Candidate	Votes	%
Republican	Steve Marshall (incumbent)	1,004,438	58.79
Democratic	Joseph Siegelman	702,858	41.14
Write-in		1,141	0.07
Total votes		1,708,437	100.00
Republican hold			

==== By county ====
County	Steve Marshall Republican		Joseph Siegelman Democratic		Write-in Various		Margin		Total
County	#	%	#	%	#	%	#	%	Total
Autauga	13,397	68.12%	6,262	31.84%	9	0.05%	7,135	36.28%	19,668
Baldwin	56,956	73.45%	20,532	26.48%	52	0.07%	36,424	46.97%	77,540
Barbour	4,021	48.28%	4,307	51.71%	1	0.01%	-286	-3.43%	8,329
Bibb	5,082	73.98%	1,784	25.97%	3	0.04%	3,298	48.01%	6,869
Blount	16,917	86.99%	2,516	12.94%	15	0.08%	14,401	74.05%	19,448
Bullock	829	22.51%	2,854	77.49%	0	0.00%	-2,025	-54.98%	3,683
Butler	4,301	53.24%	3,771	46.68%	6	0.07%	530	6.56%	8,078
Calhoun	24,230	65.75%	12,606	34.21%	15	0.04%	11,624	31.54%	36,851
Chambers	6,310	56.39%	4,873	43.55%	7	0.06%	1,437	12.84%	11,190
Cherokee	6,750	80.12%	1,673	19.86%	2	0.02%	5,077	60.26%	8,425
Chilton	11,028	80.42%	2,681	19.55%	4	0.03%	8,347	60.87%	13,713
Choctaw	3,063	51.50%	2,883	48.47%	2	0.03%	180	3.03%	5,948
Clarke	6,021	54.28%	5,068	45.69%	3	0.03%	953	8.59%	11,092
Clay	4,089	76.36%	1,265	23.62%	1	0.02%	2,824	52.74%	5,355
Cleburne	3,844	87.84%	530	12.11%	2	0.05%	3,314	75.73%	4,376
Coffee	11,772	73.92%	4,148	26.05%	5	0.03%	7,624	47.87%	15,925
Colbert	12,343	59.94%	8,234	39.98%	16	0.08%	4,109	19.95%	20,593
Conecuh	2,273	46.68%	2,594	53.28%	2	0.04%	-321	-6.59%	4,869
Coosa	2,696	62.81%	1,595	37.16%	1	0.02%	1,101	25.65%	4,292
Covington	9,456	78.99%	2,511	20.98%	4	0.03%	6,945	58.02%	11,971
Crenshaw	3,517	65.89%	1,818	34.06%	3	0.06%	1,699	31.83%	5,338
Cullman	24,141	84.49%	4,415	15.45%	18	0.06%	19,726	69.03%	28,574
Dale	10,061	70.69%	4,154	29.19%	17	0.12%	5,907	41.51%	14,232
Dallas	4,387	29.00%	10,729	70.91%	14	0.09%	-6,342	-41.92%	15,130
DeKalb	17,123	80.75%	4,070	19.19%	13	0.06%	13,053	61.55%	21,206
Elmore	20,864	71.03%	8,484	28.88%	24	0.08%	12,380	42.15%	29,372
Escambia	7,692	64.25%	4,273	35.69%	7	0.06%	3,419	28.56%	11,972
Etowah	23,594	68.62%	10,771	31.32%	20	0.06%	12,823	37.29%	34,385
Fayette	5,290	72.78%	1,967	27.06%	11	0.15%	3,323	45.72%	7,268
Franklin	5,810	67.65%	2,771	32.27%	7	0.08%	3,039	35.39%	8,588
Geneva	7,517	84.12%	1,413	15.81%	6	0.07%	6,104	68.31%	8,936
Greene	616	14.88%	3,524	85.10%	1	0.02%	-2,908	-70.22%	4,141
Hale	2,306	35.53%	4,185	64.47%	0	0.00%	-1,879	-28.95%	6,491
Henry	4,343	65.52%	2,283	34.44%	3	0.05%	2,060	31.08%	6,629
Houston	22,203	69.09%	9,904	30.82%	28	0.09%	12,299	38.27%	32,135
Jackson	11,877	76.33%	3,676	23.62%	8	0.05%	8,201	52.70%	15,561
Jefferson	106,787	41.56%	149,983	58.37%	173	0.07%	-43,196	-16.81%	256,943
Lamar	4,362	81.92%	960	18.03%	3	0.06%	3,402	63.89%	5,325
Lauderdale	19,910	64.83%	10,776	35.09%	23	0.07%	9,134	29.74%	30,709
Lawrence	7,601	64.40%	4,196	35.55%	5	0.04%	3,405	28.85%	11,802
Lee	28,579	58.30%	20,402	41.62%	41	0.08%	8,177	16.68%	49,022
Limestone	22,637	67.77%	10,747	32.17%	18	0.05%	11,890	35.60%	33,402
Lowndes	1,320	26.27%	3,704	73.71%	1	0.02%	-2,384	-47.44%	5,025
Macon	1,078	14.91%	6,147	85.01%	6	0.08%	-5,069	-70.10%	7,231
Madison	75,292	53.52%	65,259	46.38%	139	0.10%	10,033	7.13%	140,690
Marengo	3,880	44.51%	4,836	55.48%	1	0.01%	-956	-10.97%	8,717
Marion	7,723	79.36%	2,002	20.57%	6	0.06%	5,721	58.79%	9,731
Marshall	22,952	84.05%	4,328	15.85%	26	0.10%	18,624	68.20%	27,306
Mobile	68,417	51.55%	64,206	48.37%	103	0.08%	4,211	3.17%	132,726
Monroe	4,567	51.77%	4,251	48.19%	3	0.03%	316	3.58%	8,821
Montgomery	26,120	33.93%	50,796	65.98%	68	0.09%	-24,676	-32.05%	76,984
Morgan	28,171	71.58%	11,171	28.38%	16	0.04%	17,000	43.19%	39,358
Perry	995	23.56%	3,228	76.42%	1	0.02%	-2,233	-52.86%	4,224
Pickens	4,587	55.65%	3,650	44.28%	6	0.07%	937	11.37%	8,243
Pike	5,684	54.83%	4,680	45.14%	3	0.03%	1,004	9.68%	10,367
Randolph	5,638	74.74%	1,904	25.24%	1	0.01%	3,734	49.50%	7,543
Russell	6,785	45.31%	8,186	54.66%	5	0.03%	-1,401	-9.35%	14,976
Shelby	58,136	69.45%	25,519	30.49%	54	0.06%	32,617	38.96%	83,709
St. Clair	23,654	79.13%	6,215	20.79%	23	0.08%	17,439	58.34%	29,892
Sumter	1,224	22.83%	4,136	77.15%	1	0.02%	-2,912	-54.32%	5,361
Talladega	15,341	58.57%	10,842	41.39%	9	0.03%	4,499	17.18%	26,192
Tallapoosa	10,609	67.69%	5,054	32.25%	9	0.06%	5,555	35.45%	15,672
Tuscaloosa	36,184	53.02%	32,024	46.92%	38	0.06%	4,160	6.10%	68,246
Walker	17,362	75.69%	5,559	24.23%	18	0.08%	11,803	51.45%	22,939
Washington	4,226	62.55%	2,529	37.43%	1	0.01%	1,697	25.12%	6,756
Wilcox	1,360	29.05%	3,320	70.91%	2	0.04%	-1,960	-41.86%	4,682
Winston	6,538	85.24%	1,124	14.65%	8	0.10%	5,414	70.59%	7,670
Totals	1,004,438	58.79%	702,858	41.14%	1,141	0.07%	301,580	17.65%	1,708,437

==== By congressional district ====
Marshall won six of seven congressional districts.

District	Marshall	Siegelman	Representative
1st	60%	40%	Bradley Byrne
2nd	61%	39%	Martha Roby
3rd	62%	38%	Mike Rogers
4th	75%	25%	Robert Aderholt
5th	61%	39%	Mo Brooks
6th	66%	34%	Gary Palmer
7th	26%	73%	Terri Sewell
