= 2014 Alabama lieutenant gubernatorial election =

- November 4, 2014
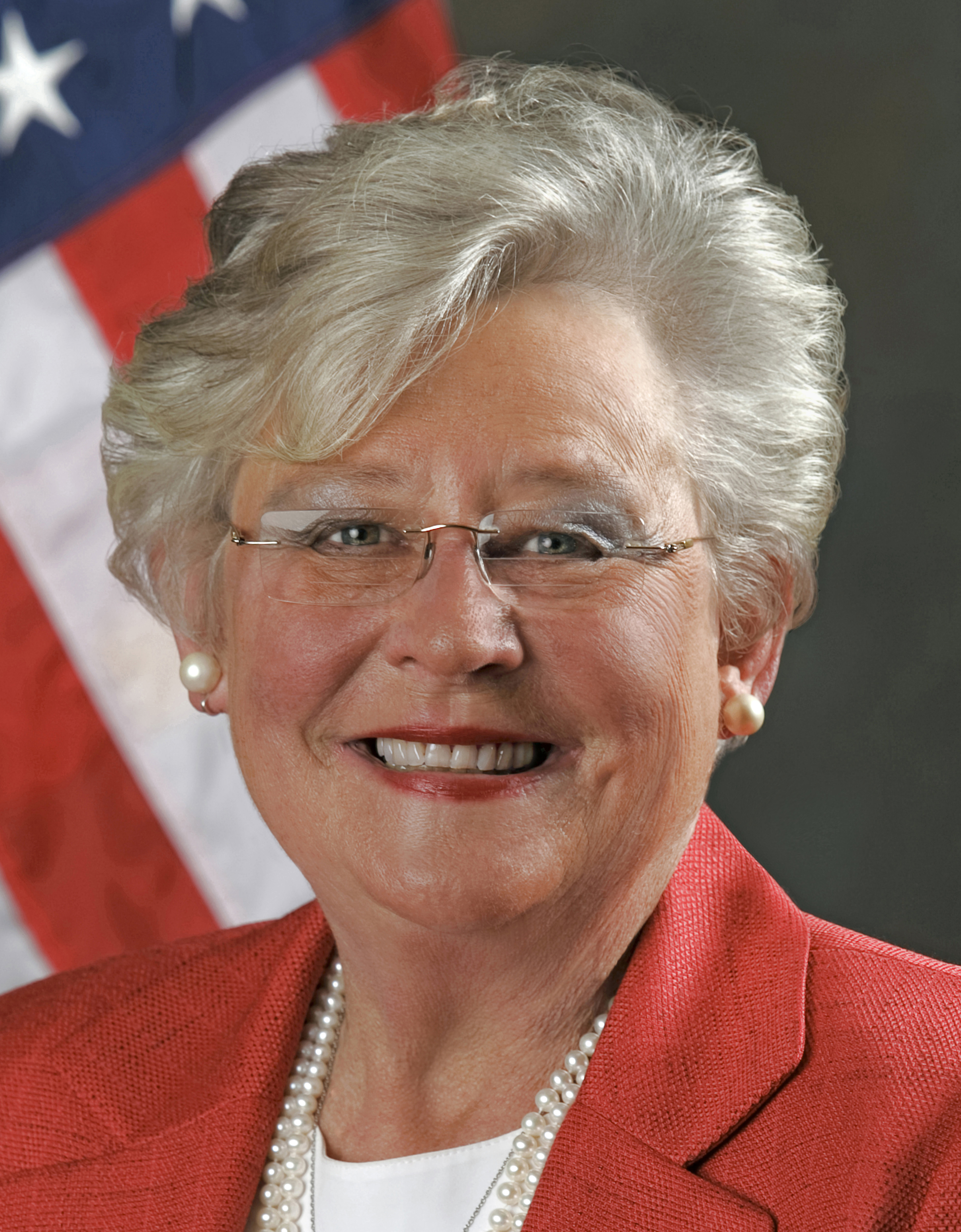

Nominee	Kay Ivey	James C. Fields
Party	Republican	Democratic
Popular vote	738,090	428,007
Percentage	63.23%	36.67%
- County results Ivey: 50–60% 60–70% 70–80% 80–90% Fields: 40–50% 50–60% 60–70% 70–80% 80–90%
Lieutenant Governor before election
Kay Ivey
Republican
Elected Lieutenant Governor
Kay Ivey
Republican

The 2014 Alabama lieutenant gubernatorial election was held on November 4, 2014, to elect the Lieutenant Governor of Alabama, concurrently with elections to the United States Senate, U.S. House of Representatives, governor, and other state and local elections. Primary elections were held on June 3, 2014, with runoff elections held on July 15 in races where no single candidate cleared at least 50% of the vote.

Incumbent Republican lieutenant governor Kay Ivey won against a primary challenge from pastor Stan Cooke, and state representative James C. Fields became the Democratic nominee without any opposition. Ivey won re-election to a second term, winning by a margin much greater than her victory in 2010.

== Republican primary ==
=== Candidates ===
==== Nominee ====
- Kay Ivey, incumbent lieutenant governor (2011–present) and former state treasurer (2003–2011)

==== Eliminated in primary ====
- Stan Cooke, pastor and candidate for Alabama's 6th congressional district in 2010

=== Endorsements ===
Kay Ivey

U.S. governors

- Mitt Romney, former Governor of Massachusetts (2003–2007), Republican nominee for president in 2012, and candidate for president in 2008

State senators

- Del Marsh, president pro tempore of the Alabama Senate (2010–present) and state senator from the 12th district (1998–present)
- J. T. Waggoner, majority leader of the Alabama Senate (2010–present) and state senator from the 16th district (1990–present)

Organizations

- Alabama Association of Realtors
- Manufacture Alabama
- Business Council of Alabama
- Alabama Farmers Federation
- Alabama Forestry Association
- NRA Political Victory Fund
- Alabama Patriots
- Alabama Retail Association
- Alabama State Troopers Association
Stan Cooke

Organizations

- Christian Coalition of Alabama
- Conservative Christians of Alabama
- Alabama Coalition of Christian Citizens
- Alabama Alliance Against Abortion
- Rainy Day Patriots
- Stop Common Core
- Alabama Tea Party Express

=== Polling ===
Poll source	Date(s) administered	Sample size (Note: Key: A – all adults RV – registered voters LV – likely voters V – unclear)	Margin of error	Kay Ivey	Stan Cooke	Undecided
Cygnal	May 29–30, 2014	1,217 (LV)	± 2.81%	53%	30%	17%
Cygnal	May 19–20, 2014	1,327 (LV)	± 2.69%	35%	18%	47%

=== Results ===
Republican primary results
Party	Candidate	Votes	%
Republican	Kay Ivey (incumbent)	257,588	61.68
Republican	Stan Cooke	160,023	38.32
Total votes		417,611	100.0

== Democratic primary ==
=== Candidates ===
==== Nominee ====
- James C. Fields, state representative from the 12th district (2008–2010)

==== Withdrew before primary ====
- Scott Ninesling, paramedic

=== Results ===
Democratic primary results
Party	Candidate	Votes	%
Democratic	James C. Fields	Unopposed	
Total votes		—N/a	100.0

== General election ==
=== Endorsements ===
James C. Fields (D)

Organizations

- Alabama Voter's Coalition
- International Brotherhood of Boilermakers

=== Results ===
2014 Alabama lieutenant gubernatorial election
Party	Candidate	Votes	%	±%
Republican	Kay Ivey (incumbent)	738,090	63.23%	+11.76%
Democratic	James C. Fields	428,007	36.67%	–11.73%
Write-in		1,146	0.10%	–0.03%
Total votes		1,167,243	100%	
Republican hold				

==== Counties that flipped from Democratic to Republican ====
- Butler (Largest city: Greenville)
- Chambers (Largest city: Valley)
- Choctaw (Largest city: Butler)
- Clarke (Largest city: Jackson)
- Clay (Largest city: Lineville)
- Colbert (Largest city: Muscle Shoals)
- Conecuh (Largest city: Evergreen)
- Coosa (Largest city: Goodwater)
- Crenshaw (Largest city: Luverne)
- Etowah (Largest city: Gadsden)
- Fayette (Largest city: Fayette)
- Franklin (Largest city: Russellville)
- Lawrence (Largest city: Moulton)
- Pickens (Largest city: Aliceville)
- Pike (Largest city: Troy)
- Talladega (Largest city: Talladega)
- Tuscaloosa (Largest city: Tuscaloosa)
- Walker (Largest city: Jasper)
- Washington (Largest city: Chatom)
