= 2022 United States House of Representatives elections in Alabama =

- November 8, 2022

All 7 Alabama seats to the United States House of Representatives
- Turnout: 38.5% ▼
	Majority party	Minority party	Third party
Party	Republican	Democratic	Libertarian
Last election	6	1	New
Seats won	6	1	0
Seat change	Steady	Steady	Steady
Popular vote	942,393	318,540	74,920
Percentage	70.13%	23.71%	5.58%
Swing	▲1.1%	▼5.96%	New

Republican
50–60%
60–70%
70–80%
80–90%
>90%
Democratic
40–50%
50–60%
60–70%
70–80%
80–90%

The 2022 United States House of Representatives elections in Alabama were held on November 8, 2022, to elect the seven U.S. representatives from the state of Alabama, one from each of the state's seven congressional districts. The elections coincided with other elections to the House of Representatives, elections to the United States Senate, and various state and local elections.

Primaries in Alabama took place on May 24. If any race resulted in no candidate receiving over 50% of the vote, runoff elections would occur on June 21.

== Background ==
Following redistricting as a result of the 2020 United States census, the Republican-controlled Alabama Legislature adopted a new congressional map in the autumn of 2021. The map drew one of Alabama's seven congressional districts with an African-American majority population; a single African-American majority congressional district had been the case for over 30 years. Three federal judges denied this map on January 24, 2022, stating that Alabama, which had an African-American population of 27% as of 2022, needed two congressional districts that were likely to elect African-American representatives, in accordance with the Voting Rights Act of 1965. John Wahl, the chairman of the Alabama Republican Party, said he expected the court's decision to be appealed. The office of the attorney general of Alabama began the process of an appeal on January 25, 2022. The qualifying deadline for congressional candidates was also extended from January 28 to February 11.

The New York Times predicted that the appeal would go to the U.S. Supreme Court to address the practice of racial gerrymandering in the United States. If a second African-American majority district was upheld and passed, it would have been a significant pick-up for Democrats in Alabama. In response to the federal ruling, Representative Jerry Carl stated during a radio interview that his campaign was considering alternative strategies in the event that he was forced to run against fellow Representative Barry Moore. Chairman Wahl stated on January 28 that the Republican Party would plan to win all seven congressional seats if a new map created two competitive seats with slight African-American majorities, rather than one district guaranteed for a Democratic victory.

Ultimately, the case went to the Supreme Court, which ruled in a 5–4 decision on February 7, 2022, that Alabama's request for a stay would be granted, halting the three-judge panel's decision, upholding the state's original map and signifying a victory for Republicans in Alabama. Justice Brett Kavanaugh, joined by Samuel Alito, wrote a majority opinion, with Elena Kagan authoring a dissent.

The decision created some confusion over whether the extension for the filing deadline had been overturned as well; Secretary of State John Merrill clarified that the deadline would be left up to the parties. While the Democratic Party confirmed that it would keep its deadline as February 11, the Republican deadline was left unclear. This led to disputes over the eligibility for candidates to qualify for Republican primaries, specifically Jeff Coleman in District 2, and Jamie Aiken in District 6. Republican chairman John Wahl stated that the party would commit to state laws and party bylaws regarding the controversy. Following legal action, the U.S. District Court for Northern Alabama ruled against Coleman on February 25, 2022, establishing that it could not force the Alabama Republican Party to list the candidate's name on the ballot.

The case eventually led to a Supreme Court ruling in Allen v. Milligan during the 2024 election cycle, in which the lower court's ruling was upheld and a second African-American majority district was mandated, marking a major reversal and victory for Democratic voting rights activists.

== District 1 ==
2022 Alabama's 1st congressional district election
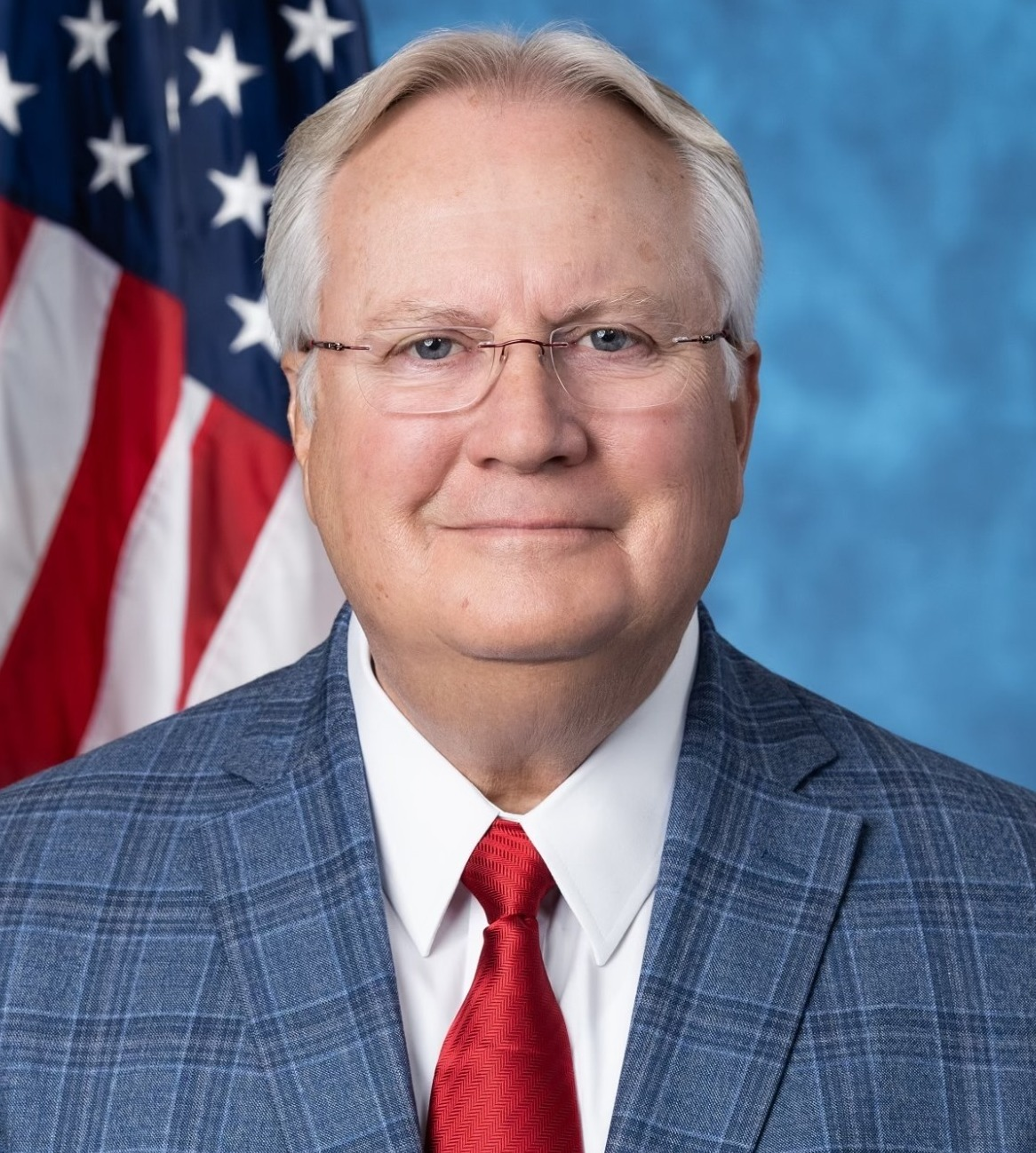

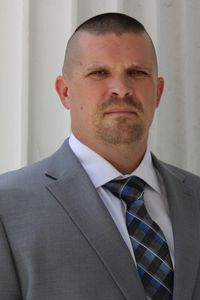
Nominee	Jerry Carl	Alexander Remrey
Party	Republican	Libertarian
Popular vote	140,592	26,369
Percentage	83.6%	15.7%
- Carl: 40–50% 50–60% 60–70% 70–80% 80–90% >90% Remrey: 40–50% 50–60% 60–70% 70–80% 80–90% >90% No votes
U.S. Representative before election
Jerry Carl
Republican
Elected U.S. Representative
Jerry Carl
Republican

The 1st district encompasses Washington, Mobile, Baldwin, Escambia and Monroe counties, including the cities of Mobile, Bay Minette, Foley, and Monroeville. The incumbent was Republican Jerry Carl, who had represented the district since 2021 and was elected with 64.4% of the vote in 2020.

No Democratic candidates qualified to run in this district, initially leaving Carl unopposed. However, the Libertarian Party qualified for ballot access in May 2022, presenting a general election challenge to Carl.

=== Republican primary ===
==== Candidates ====
===== Nominee =====
- Jerry Carl, incumbent U.S. representative

===== Failed to qualify =====
- Peter Alcorn

=== Libertarian nomination ===
No primary was held for Libertarian candidates, and they were instead nominated by the party.

==== Nominee ====
- Alexander Remrey, tech support specialist and Army veteran

=== General election ===
==== Endorsements ====
Jerry Carl (R)

Labor unions

- United Mine Workers of America

==== Predictions ====
Source	Ranking	As of
The Cook Political Report	Solid R	November 5, 2021
Inside Elections	Solid R	November 22, 2021
Sabato's Crystal Ball	Safe R	November 11, 2021
Politico	Solid R	April 5, 2022
RCP	Safe R	June 9, 2022
Fox News	Solid R	July 11, 2022
DDHQ	Solid R	July 20, 2022
538	Solid R	June 30, 2022
The Economist	Safe R	September 7, 2022

==== Results ====
Alabama's 1st congressional district, 2022
Party	Candidate	Votes	%
Republican	Jerry Carl (incumbent)	140,592	83.61%
Libertarian	Alexander Remrey	26,369	15.68%
Write-in		1,189	0.71%
Total votes		168,150	100.0
Republican hold			

== District 2 ==
2022 Alabama's 2nd congressional district election
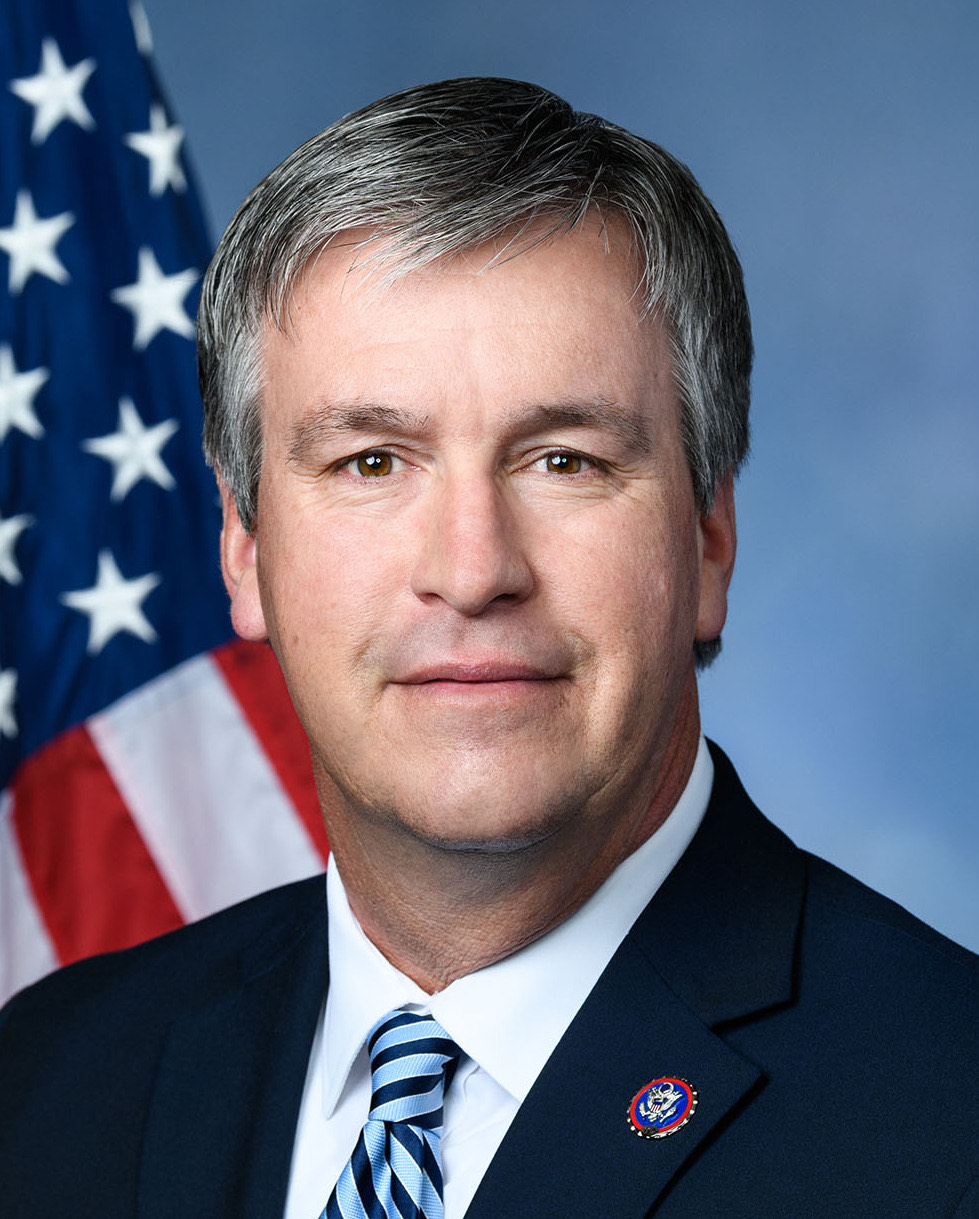

Nominee	Barry Moore	Phyllis Harvey-Hall
Party	Republican	Democratic
Popular vote	137,460	58,014
Percentage	69.1%	29.1%
- Moore: 40–50% 50–60% 60–70% 70–80% 80–90% >90% Harvey-Hall: 40–50% 50–60% 60–70% 70–80% 80–90% >90% No votes
U.S. Representative before election
Barry Moore
Republican
Elected U.S. Representative
Barry Moore
Republican

The 2nd district encompasses most of the Montgomery metropolitan area, and stretches into the Wiregrass Region in the southeastern portion of the state, including Andalusia, Dothan, Greenville, and Troy. The incumbent was Republican Barry Moore, who was elected with 65.2% of the vote in 2020.

Businessman and 2020 candidate Jeff Coleman attempted to launch a primary challenge against Moore, and even purchased an advertisement campaign including airtime during Super Bowl LVI in local markets. However, a federal panel ruled against his candidacy, as he qualified after the Supreme Court upheld Alabama's original congressional map and qualifying dates.

=== Republican primary ===
==== Candidates ====
===== Nominee =====
- Barry Moore, incumbent U.S. representative

===== Failed to qualify =====
- Jeff Coleman, businessman and candidate for this seat in 2020

==== Endorsements ====
Barry Moore

State officials

- Will Ainsworth, incumbent lieutenant governor of Alabama (2019–present)

Organizations

- Club for Growth

=== Democratic primary ===
==== Candidates ====
===== Nominee =====
- Phyllis Harvey-Hall, education consultant, retired teacher and Democratic nominee for this seat in 2020

===== Eliminated in primary =====
- Vimal Patel, real estate broker (endorsed Harvey-Hall)

===== Withdrawn =====
- Terell Anderson, graphic designer and progressive activist (endorsed Harvey-Hall)
- Jack Slate, tutor (endorsed Harvey-Hall)

==== Endorsements ====
Vimal Patel

Organizations

- Alabama New South Alliance
Terell Anderson (withdrawn)

Individuals

- Marianne Williamson, author and candidate for the Democratic nomination for president of the United States in 2020

==== Results ====
Democratic primary results
Party	Candidate	Votes	%
Democratic	Phyllis Harvey-Hall	16,884	68.8
Democratic	Vimal Patel	7,667	31.2
Total votes		24,551	100.0

=== Libertarian nomination ===
No primary was held for Libertarian candidates, and they were instead nominated by the party.

==== Nominee ====
- Jonathan Realz, actor and activist

=== General election ===
==== Predictions ====
Source	Ranking	As of
The Cook Political Report	Solid R	November 5, 2021
Inside Elections	Solid R	November 22, 2021
Sabato's Crystal Ball	Safe R	November 11, 2021
Politico	Solid R	April 5, 2022
RCP	Safe R	June 9, 2022
Fox News	Solid R	July 11, 2022
DDHQ	Solid R	July 20, 2022
538	Solid R	June 30, 2022
The Economist	Safe R	September 7, 2022

==== Post-primary endorsements ====
Phyllis Harvey-Hall (D)

Labor unions

- Alabama AFL–CIO

==== Results ====
Alabama's 2nd congressional district, 2022
Party	Candidate	Votes	%
Republican	Barry Moore (incumbent)	137,460	69.09%
Democratic	Phyllis Harvey-Hall	58,014	29.16%
Libertarian	Jonathan Realz	3,396	1.71%
Write-in		91	0.05%
Total votes		198,961	100.0
Republican hold			

== District 3 ==
2022 Alabama's 3rd congressional district election
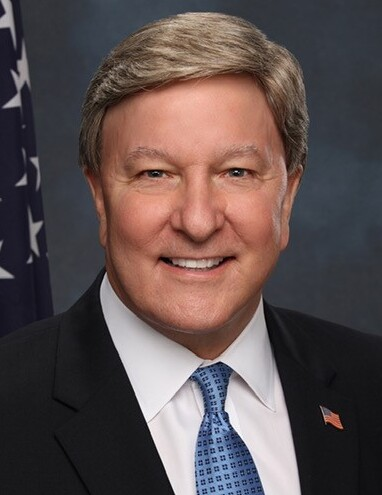

Nominee	Mike Rogers	Lin Veasey
Party	Republican	Democratic
Popular vote	135,602	47,859
Percentage	71.2%	25.1%
- Rogers: 40–50% 50–60% 60–70% 70–80% 80–90% >90% Veasey: 40–50% 50–60% 60–70% 70–80% 80–90% >90% No votes
U.S. Representative before election
Mike Rogers
Republican
Elected U.S. Representative
Mike Rogers
Republican

The 3rd district is based in eastern Alabama, taking in Anniston, Auburn, Talladega, and Tuskegee. The incumbent was Republican Mike Rogers, who was re-elected with 67.5% of the vote in 2020.

=== Republican primary ===
==== Candidates ====
===== Nominee =====
- Mike Rogers, incumbent U.S. representative

===== Eliminated in primary =====
- Michael T. Joiner, plumbing contractor

==== Endorsements ====
Mike Rogers

PACs

- Alabama RetailPAC
- National Rifle Association – Political Victory Fund
Michael T. Joiner

Organizations

- Alabama Republican Assembly
- Christian Conservatives of Alabama

==== Results ====
Republican primary results
Party	Candidate	Votes	%
Republican	Mike Rogers (incumbent)	70,843	81.9
Republican	Michael Joiner	15,618	18.1
Total votes		86,461	100.0

=== Democratic primary ===
==== Candidates ====
===== Nominee =====
- Lin Veasey, pastor

=== Libertarian nomination ===
No primary was held for Libertarian candidates, and they were instead nominated by the party.

==== Nominee ====
- Thomas Casson, former congressional staffer and candidate for this seat in 2014 and 2020

=== Independents ===
==== Candidates ====
- Douglas "Doug" Bell, businessman, pastor and Republican nominee for Georgia's 5th congressional district in 2016 (qualified ballot access)

=== General election ===
==== Predictions ====
Source	Ranking	As of
The Cook Political Report	Solid R	November 5, 2021
Inside Elections	Solid R	November 22, 2021
Sabato's Crystal Ball	Safe R	November 11, 2021
Politico	Solid R	April 5, 2022
RCP	Safe R	June 9, 2022
Fox News	Solid R	July 11, 2022
DDHQ	Solid R	July 20, 2022
538	Solid R	June 30, 2022
The Economist	Safe R	September 7, 2022

==== Post-primary endorsements ====
Lin Veasey (D)

Labor unions

- Alabama AFL–CIO

==== Results ====
Alabama's 3rd congressional district, 2022
Party	Candidate	Votes	%
Republican	Mike Rogers (incumbent)	135,602	71.22%
Democratic	Lin Veasey	47,859	25.14%
Independent	Douglas "Doug" Bell	3,831	2.01%
Libertarian	Thomas Casson	3,034	1.59%
Write-in		80	0.04%
Total votes		190,406	100.0
Republican hold			

== District 4 ==
2022 Alabama's 4th congressional district election
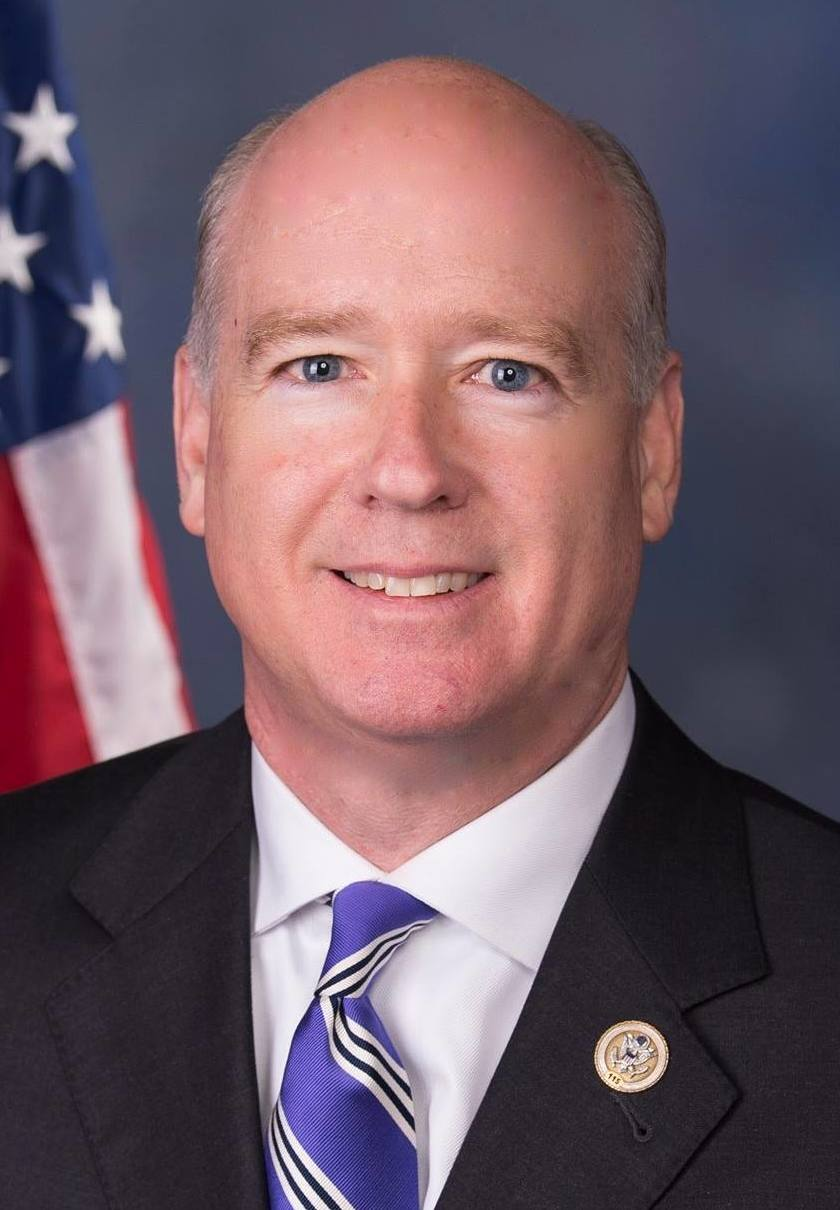

Nominee	Robert Aderholt	Rick Neighbors
Party	Republican	Democratic
Popular vote	164,655	26,694
Percentage	84.1%	13.6%
- Aderholt: 40–50% 50–60% 60–70% 70–80% 80–90% >90% Neighbors: 40–50% 50–60% 60–70% 70–80% 80–90% >90% No votes
U.S. Representative before election
Robert Aderholt
Republican
Elected U.S. Representative
Robert Aderholt
Republican

The 4th district is located in rural north-central Alabama, including Cullman, Gadsden, Jasper, and Muscle Shoals. The incumbent was Republican Robert Aderholt, who was re-elected with 82.2% of the vote in 2020.

=== Republican primary ===
==== Candidates ====
===== Nominee =====
- Robert Aderholt, incumbent U.S. representative

=== Democratic primary ===
==== Candidates ====
===== Nominee =====
- Rick Neighbors, manufacturing project manager, Democratic nominee for this seat in 2020 and former candidate in 2012 and 2018

===== Eliminated in primary =====
- Rhonda Gore, teacher, former candidate for this seat in 2012

==== Results ====
Democratic primary results
Party	Candidate	Votes	%
Democratic	Rick Neighbors	4,500	54.1
Democratic	Rhonda Gore	3,823	45.9
Total votes		8,323	100.0

=== Libertarian nomination ===
No primary was held for Libertarian candidates, and they were instead nominated by the party.

==== Nominee ====
- John C. Cochran, businessman

=== General election ===
==== Predictions ====
Source	Ranking	As of
The Cook Political Report	Solid R	November 5, 2021
Inside Elections	Solid R	November 22, 2021
Sabato's Crystal Ball	Safe R	November 11, 2021
Politico	Solid R	April 5, 2022
RCP	Safe R	June 9, 2022
Fox News	Solid R	July 11, 2022
DDHQ	Solid R	July 20, 2022
538	Solid R	June 30, 2022
The Economist	Safe R	September 7, 2022

==== Endorsements ====
Rick Neighbors (D)

Labor unions

- Alabama AFL–CIO

==== Results ====
Alabama's 4th congressional district, 2022
Party	Candidate	Votes	%
Republican	Robert Aderholt (incumbent)	164,655	84.12%
Democratic	Rick Neighbors	26,694	13.64%
Libertarian	John C. Cochran	4,303	2.20%
Write-in		81	0.04%
Total votes		195,733	100.0
Republican hold			

== District 5 ==
2022 Alabama's 5th congressional district election
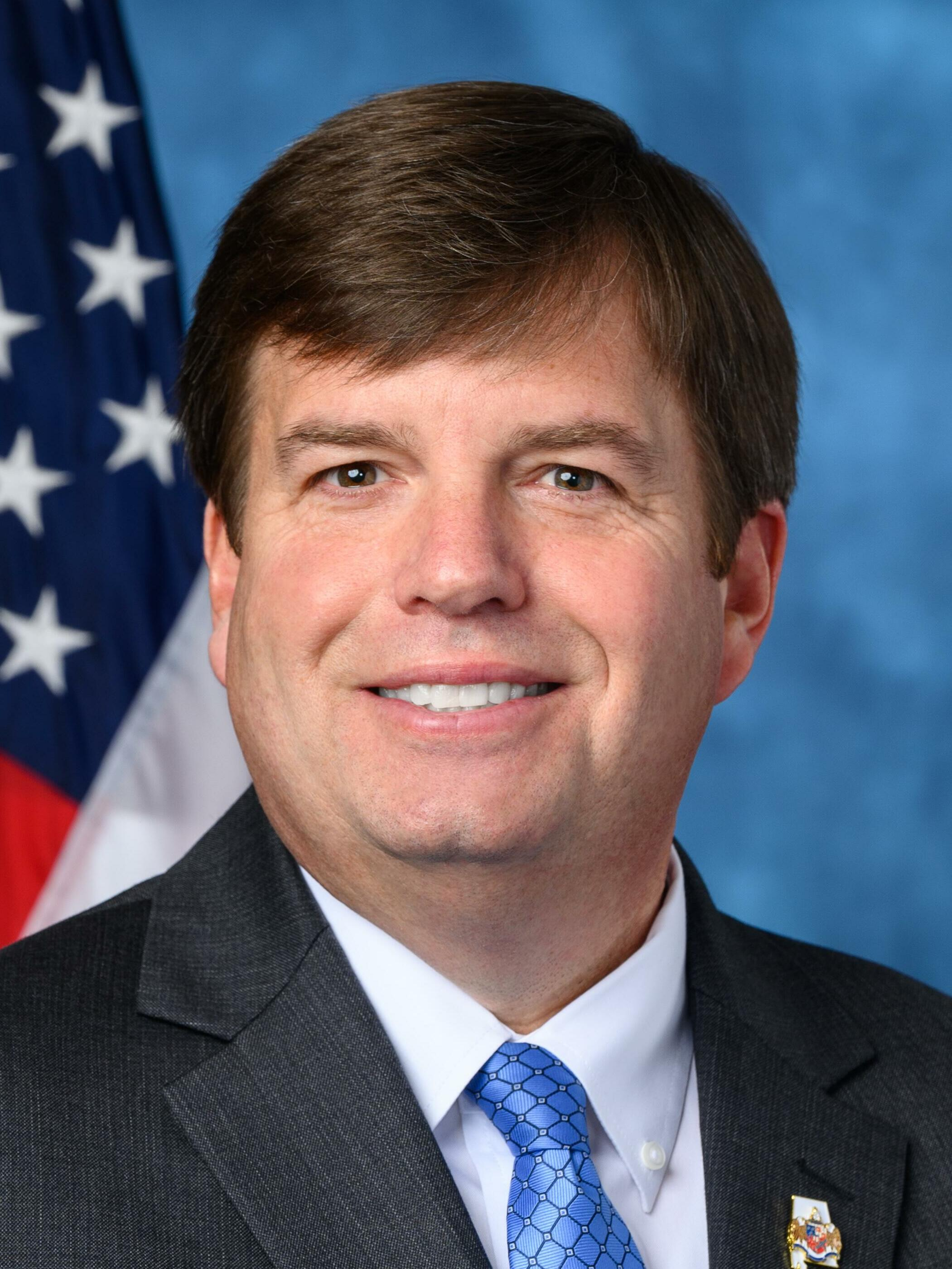

Nominee	Dale Strong	Kathy Warner-Stanton
Party	Republican	Democratic
Popular vote	142,435	62,740
Percentage	67.1%	29.6%
- Strong: 40–50% 50–60% 60–70% 70–80% 80–90% >90% Warner-Stanton: 40–50% 50–60% 60–70% 70–80% 80–90% >90% No votes
U.S. Representative before election
Mo Brooks
Republican
Elected U.S. Representative
Dale Strong
Republican

The 5th district is based in northern Alabama, including the city of Huntsville, as well as Athens, Decatur, Florence, and Scottsboro. The incumbent was Republican Mo Brooks, who was re-elected with 95.8% of the vote in 2020, without major-party opposition. On March 22, 2021, Brooks announced his retirement and intention to run for U.S. Senate.

=== Republican primary ===
==== Candidates ====
===== Nominee =====
- Dale Strong, chair of the Madison County Commission (2012–2023)

===== Eliminated in runoff =====
- Casey Wardynski, former assistant secretary of the Army (2019–2021) and former Huntsville City Schools superintendent (2011–2016)

===== Eliminated in primary =====
- Andy Blalock, teacher and rancher
- John Roberts, economic developer
- Paul Sanford, former member of the Alabama State Senate for the 7th district (2009–2018)
- Harrison Wright, podcaster and activist

===== Failed to qualify =====
- Dexter Donnell, project manager
- Doug Ehrle, sales program manager

===== Declined =====
- Mo Brooks, incumbent U.S. representative (ran for U.S. Senate)

==== Endorsements ====
Dale Strong

Organizations

- Alabama Associated General Contractors
- Alabama Farmers Federation
- Alabama State Fraternal Order of Police
- League of Southeastern Credit Unions
- National Association of Realtors
- Professional Fire Fighters of Alabama
- Tea Party Express
- United States Chamber of Commerce

PACs

- Patriots First PAC
Casey Wardynski

Executive branch officials

- Michael Flynn, 24th U.S. national security advisor (2017)
- Joshua Whitehouse, former White House liaison to the Department of Defense and Department of Homeland Security (2020–2021)

U.S. representatives

- Jim Jordan, U.S. representative for Ohio's 4th congressional district (2007–present)

Individuals

- Harrison Wright, activist and former candidate for this seat, eliminated in primary
- Yaffee, conservative talk radio host of The Yaffee Program and Yellowhammer News contributor

Organizations

- Associated Builders and Contractors of North Alabama
- Republicans for National Renewal

PACs

- House Freedom Fund
Andy Blalock (eliminated)

Organizations

- Log Cabin Republicans
Paul Sanford (eliminated)

Organizations

- Alabama Republican Assembly
- Alabama Restaurant and Hospitality Association
- Christian Conservatives of Alabama

PACs

- Eagle Forum PAC

==== Debates and forums ====
2022 AL-5 Republican primary debates and forums
No.	Date	Host	Moderator	Link	Participants					
P Participant A Absent E Eliminated										
P Participant A Absent E Eliminated					Blalock	Roberts	Sanford	Strong	Wardynski	Wright
1	January 18, 2022	Republican Women of Huntsville	Dale Jackson	N/A	P	P	P	P	P	P
2	April 21, 2022	Huntsville South Civic Association	N/A	N/A	A	A	P	A	P	A
3	May 1, 2022	Athens-Limestone Republican Women	Tracy Smith		P	P	P	A	P	P
4	June 14, 2022	WHDF North Alabama's CW	Jerry Hayes; Christine Killimayer		E	E	E	P	P	E

==== First round ====
===== Polling =====
Poll source	Date(s) administered	Sample size (Note: Key: A – all adults RV – registered voters LV – likely voters V – unclear)	Margin of error	Andy Blalock	John Roberts	Paul Sanford	Dale Strong	Casey Wardynski	Harrison Wright	Undecided
Cherry Communications (R) (Note: Poll sponsored by FarmPAC, a wing of the Alabama Farmers Federation, which supports Strong)	February 2–6, 2022	600 (LV)	± 4.0%	4%	5%	7%	30%	6%	2%	46%

===== Results =====
Republican primary results
Party	Candidate	Votes	%
Republican	Dale Strong	45,319	44.7
Republican	Casey Wardynski	23,340	23.0
Republican	John Roberts	13,979	13.8
Republican	Paul Sanford	11,573	11.4
Republican	Andy Blalock	5,608	5.5
Republican	Harrison Wright	1,509	1.5
Total votes		101,328	100.0

==== Runoff ====
===== Polling =====
Poll source	Date(s) administered	Sample size	Margin of error	Dale Strong	Casey Wardynski	Undecided
Cygnal (R)	June 5–6, 2022	400 (LV)	± 4.9%	46%	31%	24%

===== Debate =====
2022 Alabama's 5th congressional district Republican primary runoff debate
No.	Date	Host	Moderator	Link	Republican	Republican
Key: P Participant A Absent N Not invited I Invited W Withdrawn						
Key: P Participant A Absent N Not invited I Invited W Withdrawn					Dale Strong	Casey Wardynski
1	Jun. 14, 2022	WHNT-TV	Jerry Hayes; Christine Killimayer		P	P

===== Results =====
Republican primary runoff results
Party	Candidate	Votes	%
Republican	Dale Strong	48,138	63.4
Republican	Casey Wardynski	27,794	36.6
Total votes		75,932	100.0

=== Democratic primary ===
==== Candidates ====
===== Nominee =====
- Kathy Warner-Stanton, programming project manager

===== Eliminated in primary =====
- Charlie Thompson III, car rental manager

===== Removed from ballot =====
- Ben Gyasi

==== Endorsements ====
Kathy Warner-Stanton

Organizations

- Alabama New South Alliance

==== Results ====
Democratic primary results
Party	Candidate	Votes	%
Democratic	Kathy Warner-Stanton	9,010	57.2
Democratic	Charlie Thompson III	6,739	42.8
Total votes		15,749	100.0

=== Libertarian nomination ===
No primary was held for Libertarian candidates, and they were instead nominated by the party.

==== Nominee ====
- Phillip "PJ" Greer, Marine Corps veteran

=== General election ===
==== Predictions ====
Source	Ranking	As of
The Cook Political Report	Solid R	November 5, 2021
Inside Elections	Solid R	November 22, 2021
Sabato's Crystal Ball	Safe R	November 11, 2021
Politico	Solid R	April 5, 2022
RCP	Safe R	June 9, 2022
Fox News	Solid R	July 11, 2022
DDHQ	Solid R	July 20, 2022
538	Solid R	June 30, 2022
The Economist	Safe R	September 7, 2022

==== Post-primary endorsements ====
Kathy Warner-Stanton (D)

Labor unions

- Alabama AFL–CIO

==== Results ====
Alabama's 5th congressional district, 2022
Party	Candidate	Votes	%
Republican	Dale Strong	142,435	67.09%
Democratic	Kathy Warner-Stanton	62,740	29.55%
Libertarian	Phillip "PJ" Greer	6,773	3.19%
Write-in		369	0.17%
Total votes		212,317	100.0
Republican hold			

== District 6 ==
2022 Alabama's 6th congressional district election
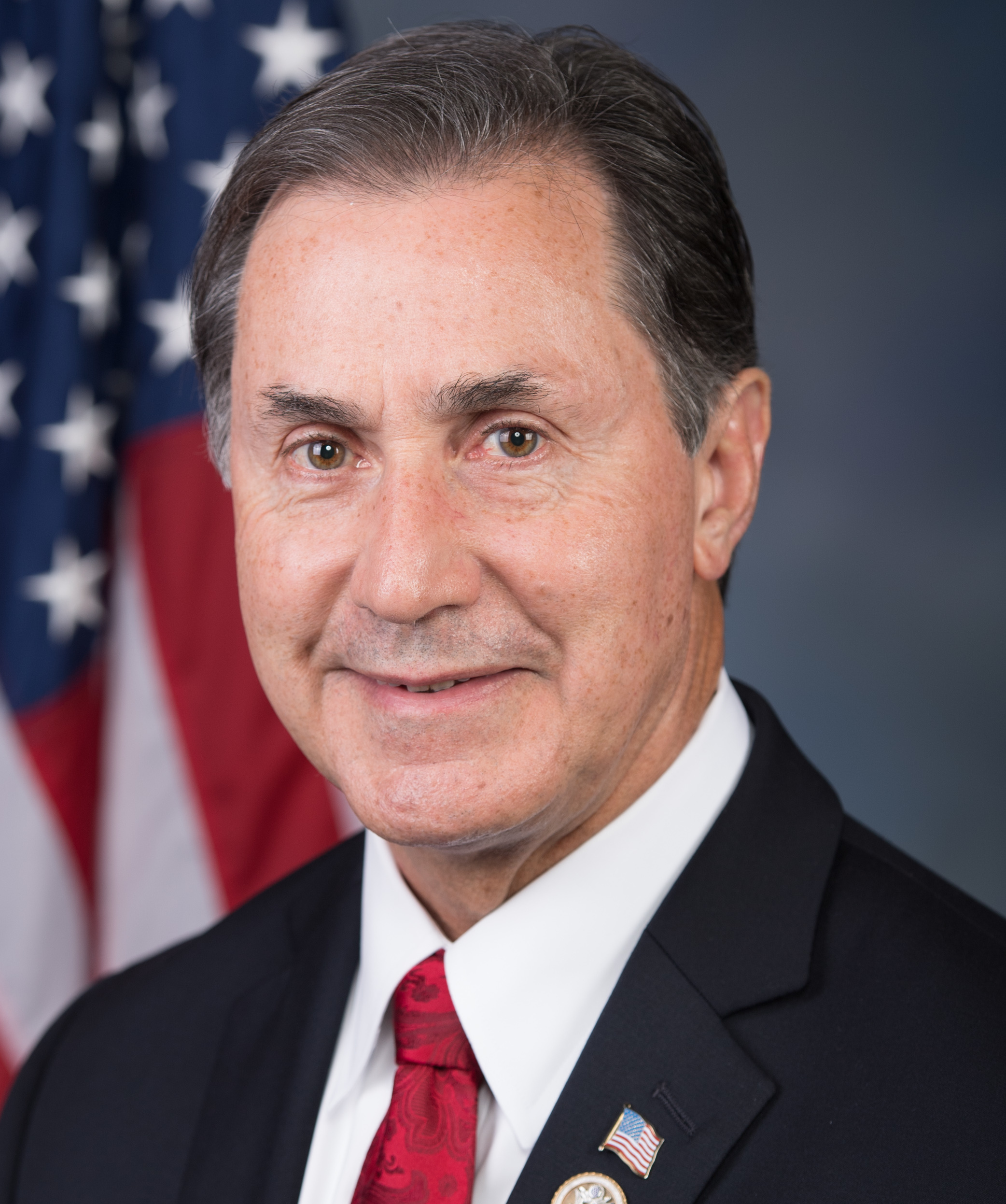

Nominee	Gary Palmer	Andria Chieffo
Party	Republican	Libertarian
Popular vote	154,233	27,833
Percentage	83.7%	15.1%
- Palmer: 40–50% 50–60% 60–70% 70–80% 80–90% >90% Chieffo: 40–50% 50–60% 60–70% 70–80% 80–90% >90% No votes
U.S. Representative before election
Gary Palmer
Republican
Elected U.S. Representative
Gary Palmer
Republican

The 6th district encompasses Greater Birmingham, taking in parts of Birmingham, as well as the surrounding suburbs, including Bibb, Blount, Chilton, Coosa, and Shelby counties. Other cities include Alabaster, Hoover and Montevallo. The incumbent was Republican Gary Palmer, who was re-elected with 97.1% of the vote in 2020, without major-party opposition.

No Democratic candidates qualified to run in this district, initially leaving Palmer unopposed. However, the Libertarian Party qualified for ballot access in May 2022, presenting a general election challenge to Palmer.

=== Republican primary ===
==== Candidates ====
===== Nominee =====
- Gary Palmer, incumbent U.S. representative

===== Failed to qualify =====
- Jamie Aiken, civics educator

==== Endorsements ====
Gary Palmer

U.S. presidents

- Donald Trump, 45th president of the United States (2017–2021)

=== Libertarian nomination ===
No primary was held for Libertarian candidates, and they were instead nominated by the party.

==== Nominee ====
- Andria Chieffo, Amazon supervisor

=== General election ===
==== Predictions ====
Source	Ranking	As of
The Cook Political Report	Solid R	November 5, 2021
Inside Elections	Solid R	November 22, 2021
Sabato's Crystal Ball	Safe R	November 11, 2021
Politico	Solid R	April 5, 2022
RCP	Safe R	June 9, 2022
Fox News	Solid R	July 11, 2022
DDHQ	Solid R	July 20, 2022
538	Solid R	June 30, 2022
The Economist	Safe R	September 7, 2022

==== Results ====
Alabama's 6th congressional district, 2022
Party	Candidate	Votes	%
Republican	Gary Palmer (incumbent)	154,233	83.73%
Libertarian	Andria Chieffo	27,833	15.11%
Write-in		2,137	1.16%
Total votes		184,203	100.0
Republican hold			

== District 7 ==
2022 Alabama's 7th congressional district election
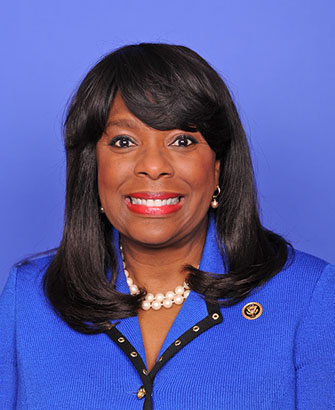

Nominee	Terri Sewell	Beatrice Nichols
Party	Democratic	Republican
Popular vote	123,233	67,416
Percentage	63.5%	34.8%
- Sewell: 40–50% 50–60% 60–70% 70–80% 80–90% >90% Nichols: 40–50% 50–60% 60–70% 70–80% 80–90% >90% No votes
U.S. Representative before election
Terri Sewell
Democratic
Elected U.S. Representative
Terri Sewell
Democratic

The 7th district encompasses the Black Belt, including Selma and Demopolis, as well as taking in majority-black areas of Birmingham, Tuscaloosa, and Montgomery. The incumbent was Democrat Terri Sewell, who was re-elected with 97.2% of the vote in 2020, without major-party opposition.

=== Democratic primary ===
==== Candidates ====
===== Nominee =====
- Terri Sewell, incumbent U.S. representative

==== Endorsements ====
Terri Sewell

Organizations

- Alabama New South Alliance
- Planned Parenthood Action Fund

=== Republican primary ===
==== Candidates ====
===== Nominee =====
- Beatrice Nichols, teacher

=== Libertarian nomination ===
No primary was held for Libertarian candidates, and they were instead nominated by the party.

==== Nominee ====
- Gavin Goodman, incumbent chairman of the Libertarian Party of Alabama and marketing manager

=== General election ===
==== Predictions ====
Source	Ranking	As of
The Cook Political Report	Solid D	November 5, 2021
Inside Elections	Solid D	November 22, 2021
Sabato's Crystal Ball	Safe D	November 11, 2021
Politico	Solid D	April 5, 2022
RCP	Safe D	June 9, 2022
Fox News	Solid D	July 11, 2022
DDHQ	Solid D	July 20, 2022
538	Solid D	June 30, 2022
The Economist	Safe D	September 7, 2022

==== Post-primary endorsements ====
Terri Sewell (D)

Labor unions

- Alabama AFL–CIO

==== Results ====
Alabama's 7th congressional district, 2022
Party	Candidate	Votes	%
Democratic	Terri Sewell (incumbent)	123,233	63.54%
Republican	Beatrice Nichols	67,416	34.76%
Libertarian	Gavin Goodman	3,212	1.66%
Write-in		79	0.04%
Total votes		193,940	100.0
Democratic hold			

== See also ==
- 2022 United States Senate election in Alabama
- 2022 United States House of Representatives elections
- 2022 Alabama gubernatorial election
- 2022 Alabama lieutenant gubernatorial election
- 2022 Alabama Senate election
- 2022 Alabama House of Representatives election
- 2022 Alabama elections

== Notes ==
Partisan clients
