= Dale Strong =

American politician (born 1970)

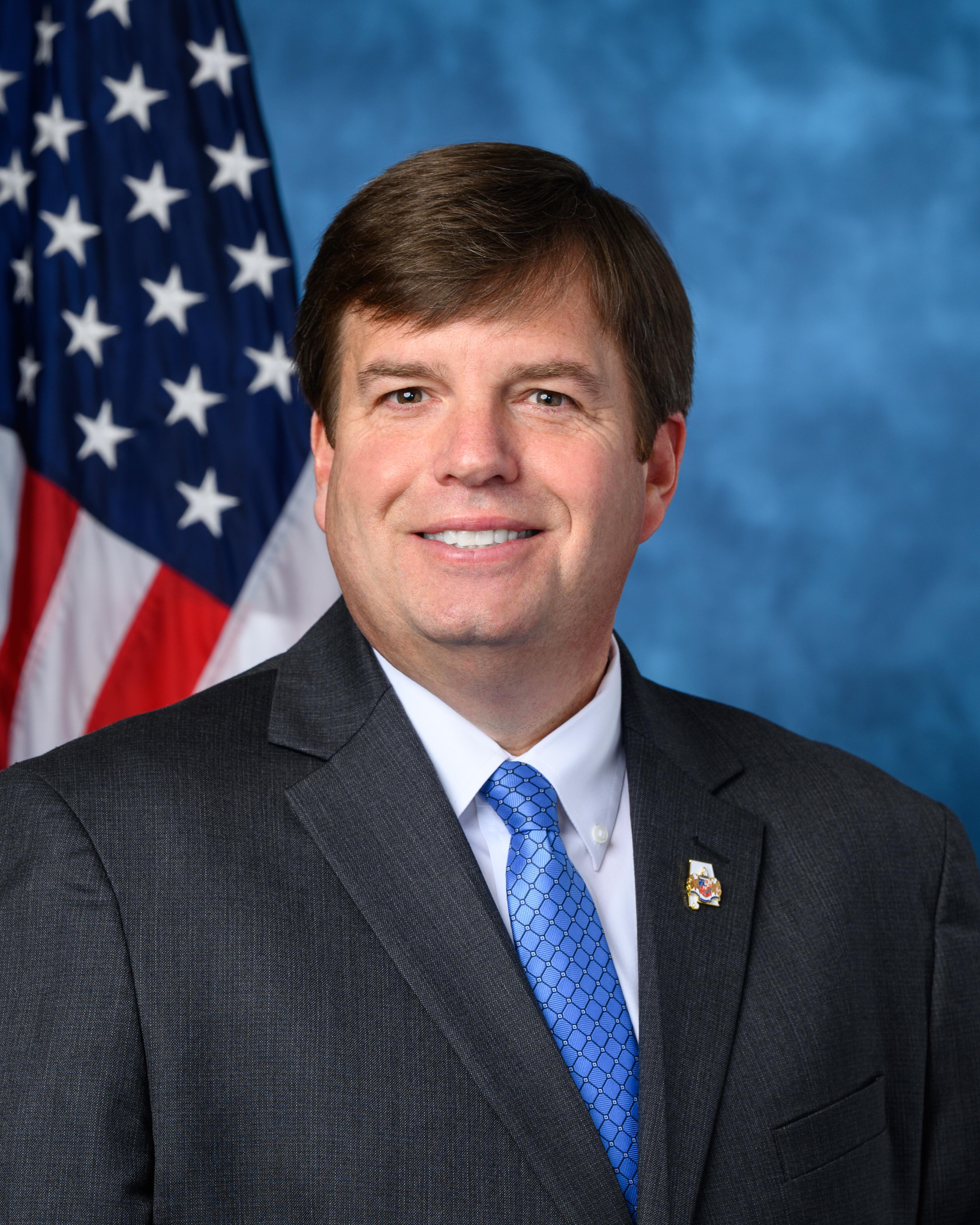
- Official portrait, 2022

Member of the U.S. House of Representatives from Alabama's 5th district
- Incumbent
- Assumed office January 3, 2023
- Preceded by: Mo Brooks

Chair of the Madison County Commission
- In office November 14, 2012 – January 2, 2023
- Preceded by: Mike Gillespie
- Succeeded by: Mac McCutcheon

Member of the Madison County Commission from the 4th district
- In office November 12, 1996 – November 14, 2012
- Succeeded by: Phil Vandiver

Personal details
- Born: Dale Whitney Strong; May 8, 1970 (age 55) Monrovia, Alabama, U.S.
- Party: Republican
- Spouse: Laura Toney (m. 1999)
- Children: 2
- Education: Athens State University (BS)
- Website: House website Campaign website

Dale Whitney Strong (born May 8, 1970) is an American politician serving as the U.S. representative for Alabama's 5th congressional district since 2023. His district includes much of North Alabama, including the city of Huntsville. A member of the Republican Party, Strong served on the Madison County Commission starting in 1996, and was its chairman from 2012 to 2023.

== Early life and career ==
Born in Monrovia, Alabama, Strong graduated from Sparkman High School in 1988. He is the son of Horace N. Strong, a founding member of the Monrovia Fire-Rescue Department, and Judy Vaughn Strong. He started service as a volunteer firefighter at age 13. Strong earned a Bachelor of Science in business administration from Athens State University and an emergency medical technician license from the University of Alabama in Huntsville. Before entering politics, he worked in public relations for First Alabama Bank and as a sales representative for Solvay S.A. He also served as a first responder and 911 dispatcher for HEMSI and Huntsville Med-Flight. In 1989, he was awarded the Public Safety Officer Medal of Valor for his service in responding to a tornado on Airport Road in Huntsville.

== Madison County Commission ==
=== District 4 seat (1996–2012) ===
Strong was first elected to the county commission for Madison County in 1996; he was the youngest elected Republican official in Alabama at the time. Strong represented the county's fourth district, including parts of Harvest and his hometown of Monrovia. While on the commission, Strong also served as a volunteer firefighter. In 2011, he worked on developing an early warning system for tornadoes and helped coordinate the county's response to the 2011 Super Outbreak of tornadoes, including charity food efforts.

In August 2011, Strong criticized Madison County Commission chairman Mike Gillespie for signing a declaration that stated debris removal from the tornado outbreak had been completed; Strong argued that the U.S. Army Corps of Engineers had not yet removed all debris in the county and presented photographs of uncleaned debris to the commission. A month later, he announced that he would challenge Gillespie, a member of the Democratic Party, for the county commission's chairmanship, by seeking the Republican nomination for the position. In October 2011, Gillespie announced he would not seek reelection. Strong defeated Wayne Parker, a former congressional candidate, in the Republican primary for the chairmanship, leaving Strong unopposed in the general election as a result of Gillespie's retirement. In November 2012, Strong became the first Republican elected chair of the Madison County Commission.

=== Chairmanship (2012–2023) ===
During his tenure as chairman, Strong focused on improving financial development in the area. In 2018, Yellowhammer News called him one of the three most influential people in North Alabama, citing his work in "streamlining government" and infrastructure projects in the area. As chairman, Strong was also involved in the recruitment of federal agencies to work at Redstone Arsenal in Madison County, including NASA and the FBI. In 2013, he said he would prioritize road improvements, school construction and economic development as chairman, saying, "if you're not focusing on economic development, your community is not going to thrive".

Strong also increased budgeting for Monrovia's fire department, as he remained active as a volunteer firefighter during his tenure. In 2019, three Madison County fire chiefs (including the chiefs of Keel Mountain, Killingsworth Cove and an anonymous third) accused Strong of giving preferential treatment to Monrovia due to his influence on the county commission; Strong responded by saying that any disparity in funding for fire stations in the county was a result of property tax levels, as Monrovia pays more in taxes and thus receives more funding.

In October 2020, Strong approved the relocation of a Confederate monument from the grounds of the Madison County courthouse to a cemetery, a move unanimously approved by the county commission. Attorney General of Alabama Steve Marshall filed a lawsuit against the commission, alleging it had violated the Alabama Memorial Preservation Act of 2017. The commission eventually paid a $25,000 fine to the state. Strong defended the move as necessary for the monument's structural integrity; the move was later cited in an unsuccessful Republican ballot challenge against him during his run for the U.S. House of Representatives.

At a January 2019 "State of the County" luncheon, Strong emphasized the commission's $174 million balanced budget and the county's job growth and improvements in college education. He highlighted Madison County's population growth and the work of the county sheriff's office in his 2022 address, as well as redevelopment plans for the county courthouse. His last meeting as county commission chairman was on December 21, 2022, following his election to the U.S. House of Representatives. He resigned on January 2, 2023, and was succeeded by former Speaker of the Alabama House of Representatives Mac McCutcheon.

== U.S. House of Representatives (2023–present) ==
=== Elections ===
==== 2022 ====
In March 2021, Strong announced his candidacy for the Republican nomination to Alabama's 5th congressional district in the 2022 election cycle. The incumbent, Mo Brooks, retired to run for U.S. Senate. Strong was the first candidate to announce his candidacy in the fifth congressional district, which includes Madison County. He said he wanted to "carry on the fight that Donald Trump started". According to AL.com, his candidacy was expected by North Alabama political experts, who had long seen him as a potential candidate for higher office. His main opponent in the Republican primary was Casey Wardynski, the former Assistant Secretary of the Army for Manpower and Reserve Affairs. Strong held a significant fundraising lead over Wardynski and four other candidates, passing the $1 million mark with a loan to his campaign in April 2022.

In the May 24 primary, Strong received the most votes but did not reach the 50% threshold to avoid a runoff against the second-place finisher, Wardynski. Strong and Wardynski participated in a televised debate hosted by WHNT-TV before the June 21 runoff. Strong discussed his plans to reduce inflation and defended his actions regarding the 2020 Confederate monument controversy. The debate turned bitter as Strong accused Wardynski of "getting personal sexual gratification" from a contract with Pinnacle Schools (Wardynski later married Pinnacle School's CEO); Wardynski responded by calling Strong a "scumbag". Strong won the runoff with about 63% of the vote. He was endorsed by former President Donald Trump ahead of the November general election and defeated Democratic nominee Kathy Warner-Stanton with about 67% of the vote.

=== Tenure ===
Before his inauguration, Strong said he would focus on border security, as well as building relationships and connections. He also expressed openness to bipartisan solutions to issues such as energy independence. Strong was an early endorsee of Donald Trump in the 2024 United States presidential election, and invited Trump to hold a rally in North Alabama.

In the 2023 Speaker of the United States House of Representatives election, Strong supported Kevin McCarthy for Speaker of the House, saying, "I share the concerns of North Alabamians about how the House has been run in recent years, but at this time there is no other alternative". During the 2023 United States debt-ceiling crisis, Strong was one of 71 Republicans who voted against the Fiscal Responsibility Act of 2023. He was also one of three members of Alabama's House delegation to vote against the bill, the others being Barry Moore and Gary Palmer.

In 2024, Strong voted against the $60 billion military aid package for Ukraine; The Washington Post reported that some of the funding would have supported defense jobs in his constituency. In January 2025, Strong cosponsored fellow GOP House member Eric Burlison's bill recognizing personhood as starting at conception.

=== Committee assignments ===
For the 119th Congress:

- Committee on Appropriations
  - Subcommittee on Commerce, Justice, Science, and Related Agencies (Vice Chair)
  - Subcommittee on the Legislative Branch
  - Subcommittee on Transportation, Housing and Urban Development, and Related Agencies
- Committee on Homeland Security
  - Subcommittee on Emergency Management and Technology (Chair)
  - Subcommittee on Oversight, Investigations, and Accountability

=== Caucus memberships ===
- Republican Study Committee

== Personal life ==
Strong is married to Laura Toney, whom he met at the Huntsville Hospital in 1997 while she was employed there as a nurse. They married in 1999 and have two children.

In October 2016, Strong appeared on an episode of The Price Is Right that had been taped in July. He was called to the contestants' row but never made it onto the main stage. In February 2019, Strong, who holds an EMT license, rescued a man who had been involved in a car accident on Interstate 65 by pulling him from the overturned vehicle and performing CPR on him.

Strong is a Baptist.

== Electoral history ==
Electoral history of Dale Strong
Year	Office	Party	Primary						General			Result	Swing	Ref.
Year	Office	Party	Total	%	P.	Runoff	%	P.	Total	%	P.	Result	Swing	Ref.
2022	U.S. Representative	Republican	45,319	44.7%	1st	48,138	63.4%	1st	142,435	67.1%	1st	Won	Hold	
2024	U.S. Representative	Republican							250,322	95.39%	1st	Won	Hold	

U.S. House of Representatives
Preceded by Mo Brooks	Member of the U.S. House of Representatives from Alabama's 5th congressional district 2023–present	Incumbent
U.S. order of precedence (ceremonial)
Preceded by Eric Sorensen	United States representatives by seniority 349th	Succeeded by Emilia Sykes
