= Paul DeMarco =

American lawyer and politician

Paul J. DeMarco
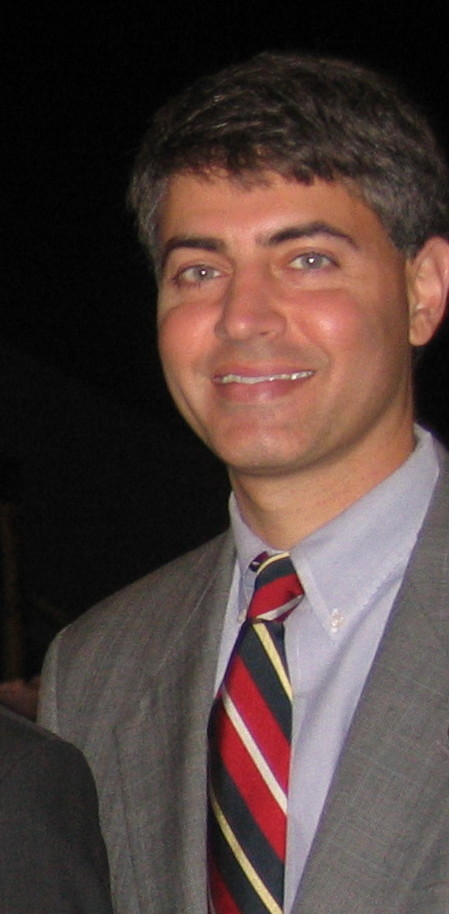

Member of the Alabama House of Representatives from the 46th district
- In office April 26, 2005 – November 5, 2014
- Preceded by: Mark Gaines
- Succeeded by: David Faulkner

Personal details
- Born: July 20, 1967 (age 59) Birmingham, Alabama, U.S.
- Party: Republican
- Spouse: Jacqueline DeMarco
- Education: Auburn University; University of Alabama School of Law
- Occupation: Attorney
- Website: State Legislature Website

Paul DeMarco for Congress, Inc.
- Campaign: United States House of Representatives elections, 2014
- Candidate: Paul DeMarco
- Affiliation: Republican Party
- Headquarters: Homewood, Alabama, U.S.
- Receipts: US$0.37 (2013-10-23)
- Slogan(s): Committed Conservative, Proven Results

Website
- Campaign Website

Paul J. DeMarco (born July 20, 1967) is an American lawyer and politician from the state of Alabama. He is a Republican member of the Alabama House of Representatives, representing the 46th district since 2005. He ran in the United States House of Representatives elections in Alabama, 2014 in the 6th in the Republican Party primary.

== Political career ==
DeMarco served as a page in the Alabama House while a high school student. He graduated cum laude from Auburn University with a Bachelor of Arts degree in journalism 1990, and from the University of Alabama School of Law with a juris doctor in 1993, where he served as the editor-in-chief of the Alabama Law Review.

DeMarco was elected to the Alabama House in a 2005 special election. With Spencer Bachus retiring from the United States House of Representatives, DeMarco ran to succeed him in Alabama's 6th congressional district in the 2014 election. DeMarco led the field in the seven-way Republican primary, the real contest in this heavily Republican district. He advanced to a runoff election, where he was defeated by former Alabama Policy Institute president Gary Palmer.

== Committee assignments ==
Judiciary (chair)
Constitutions, Campaigns and Elections
Jefferson County Legislation

== Personal ==
DeMarco and his wife, Jacqueline, live in Homewood, Alabama.
