= 2010 Alabama lieutenant gubernatorial election =

- November 2, 2010
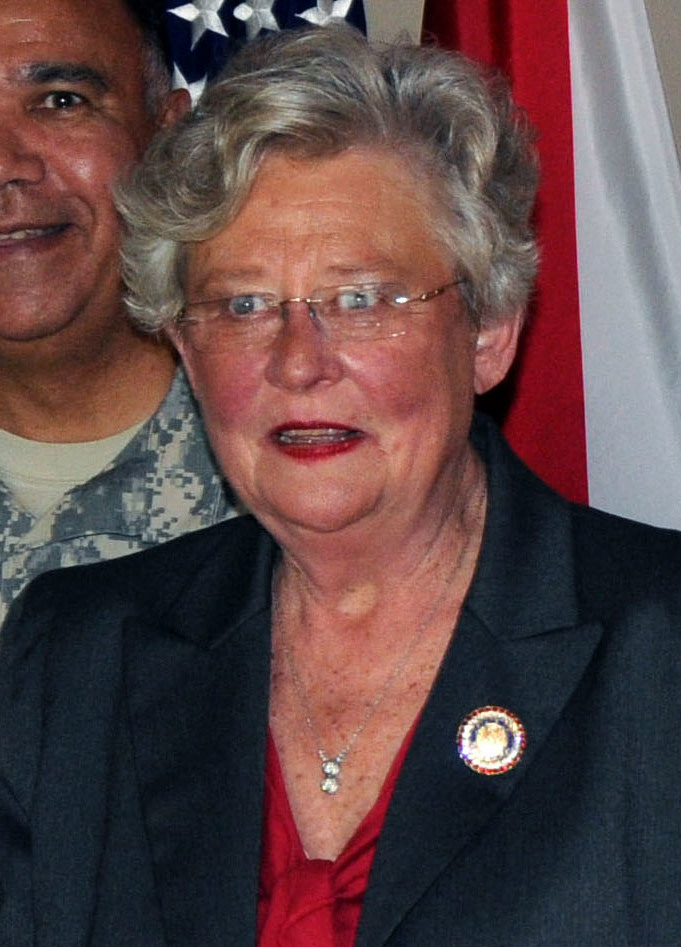

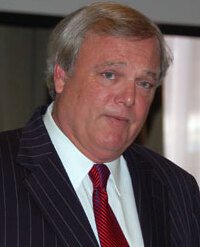
| Nominee | Kay Ivey | Jim Folsom Jr. |
| Party | Republican | Democratic |
| Popular vote | 764,112 | 718,636 |
| Percentage | 51.47% | 48.40% |
- County results Ivey: 50–60% 60–70% 70–80% Folsom: 50–60% 60–70% 70–80% 80–90%
Lieutenant Governor before election
Jim Folsom Jr.
Democratic
Elected Lieutenant Governor
Kay Ivey
Republican

The 2010 Alabama lieutenant gubernatorial election was held on November 2, 2010, to elect the Lieutenant Governor of Alabama, concurrently with elections to the United States Senate, U.S. House of Representatives, governor, and other state and local elections. Primary elections were held on June 1, 2010, with runoff elections held on July 13 in races where no single candidate cleared at least 50% of the vote.

Incumbent Democratic lieutenant governor Jim Folsom Jr. ran for re-election to a second concurrent and fourth overall term in office, but was narrowly defeated by Republican state treasurer Kay Ivey. Ivey's margin of victory was the closest of all statewide races in Alabama in 2010.

== Democratic nominee ==
- Jim Folsom Jr., incumbent lieutenant governor (2007–present, 1987–1993) and former governor (1993–1995)

== Republican primary ==
=== Candidates ===
==== Nominee ====
- Kay Ivey, incumbent state treasurer (2003–present) (originally ran for governor)

==== Eliminated in primary ====
- Hank Erwin, state senator from the 14th district (2002–present)
- Gene Ponder, teacher

==== Withdrew before primary ====
- Dean Young, businessman and former aide to Roy Moore

=== Results ===
Republican primary results
| Party | Candidate | Votes | % |
|---|---|---|---|
| Republican | Kay Ivey | 255,205 | 56.64 |
| Republican | Hank Erwin | 141,420 | 31.38 |
| Republican | Gene Ponder | 53,965 | 11.98 |
| Total votes | | 450,590 | 100 |

== General election ==
=== Endorsements ===
Jim Folsom Jr. (D)

Individuals

- Clyde Anderson, chief executive officer of Books-A-Million
- Garry N. Drummond, chief executive officer of Drummond Company
- Fred McCallum, chief executive officer of AT&T Alabama
- James McManus, chief executive officer of Energen
- Will Brooke and Dixon Brooke, chief executive officers of EBSCO Industries
- Jay F. Grinney, president and chief executive officer of HealthSouth Corporation
- Charles McCrary, chief executive officer of Alabama Power
- Van Richey, chief executive officer of Alabama Cast Iron and Pipe.

Organizations

- Alabama Realtors PAC
- SEA-PAC, political action committee of the Alabama State Employees Association.
- National Fraternal Order of Police, Alabama chapter
- Police Benevolent Association, Alabama chapter
- Alabama Business Council

Labor unions

- Alabama AFL-CIO
- International Brotherhood of Boilermakers
Kay Ivey (R)

Politicians

- Mitt Romney, former governor of Massachusetts (2003–2007) and 2008 Republican presidential candidate

Organizations

- Alabama Farmers Federation
- Alabama Forestry Association
- Alabama Citizens for Life

=== Results ===
2010 Alabama lieutenant gubernatorial election
| Party | Candidate | Votes | % | ±% |
|---|---|---|---|---|
| Republican | Kay Ivey | 764,112 | 51.47 | +2.33% |
| Democratic | Jim Folsom Jr. (incumbent) | 718,636 | 48.40 | –2.21% |
| Write-in | | 1,945 | 0.13 | –0.11% |
| Total votes | | 1,484,693 | 100 | |
| Republican gain from Democratic | | | | |

==== Counties that flipped from Democratic to Republican ====
- Bibb (Largest city: Brent)
- Cherokee (Largest city: Centre)
- Covington (Largest city: Andalusia)
- Cullman (Largest city: Cullman)
- Henry (Largest city: Headland)
- Jackson (Largest city: Scottsboro)
- Lamar (Largest city: Vernon)
- Lauderdale (Largest city: Florence)
- Marion (Largest city: Hamilton)
- Monroe (Largest city: Monroeville)
- Randolph (Largest city: Roanoke)
- Tallapoosa (Largest city: Alexander City)
