= Bill Canary =

American political consultant

Bill Canary, also William Canary, is a Republican campaign consultant in Alabama. His wife, Leura Canary, was the United States Attorney for the United States District Court for the Middle District of Alabama.

Canary used to be the president and chief executive officer of the Business Council of Alabama. He continued in his position during Will Brooke's chairmanship of the BCA's board of directors.

In 1994, Canary and Karl Rove waged a successful whispering campaign against a Supreme Court of Alabama justice using University of Alabama School of Law students. In another close election for the Supreme Court, Rove and Canary successfully halted the vote recount in poor areas of Alabama.

Canary provided polling for Mike Hubbard during his first election campaign in 1998. The two men were friends and even went to a ZZ Top concert together. Canary was among those accused of bribing Hubbard once he became Speaker of the Alabama House of Representatives, and was made to testify at trial. Canary's charge was not among the 12 of the 23 felony counts on which Hubbard was convicted.

== Siegelman controversy ==
Currently, there are ongoing claims that Canary and his wife investigated former Alabama Governor Don Siegelman for political reasons. A Republican activist, lawyer Dana Jill Simpson of Rainsville, Alabama, filed a sworn statement saying that she was on a Republican campaign conference call in 2002 when she heard Bill Canary tell other campaign workers not to worry about Siegelman because Canary's "girls" and "Karl" would make sure the Justice Department pursued the Democrat so he was not a political threat in the future. "Canary's girls" included his wife, Leura Canary, who is United States Attorney for United States District Court for the Middle District of Alabama and "Karl" referred to Karl Rove. The people on the conference call included Governor Riley's son and lawyer.

In response, Bill Canary said he has "'no recollection' of making the 'my girls' comment Simpson claimed. "Just as importantly, I've never spoken to Karl Rove or the Department of Justice about prosecuting Don Siegelman."
