= Debra S. Wada =

American government official

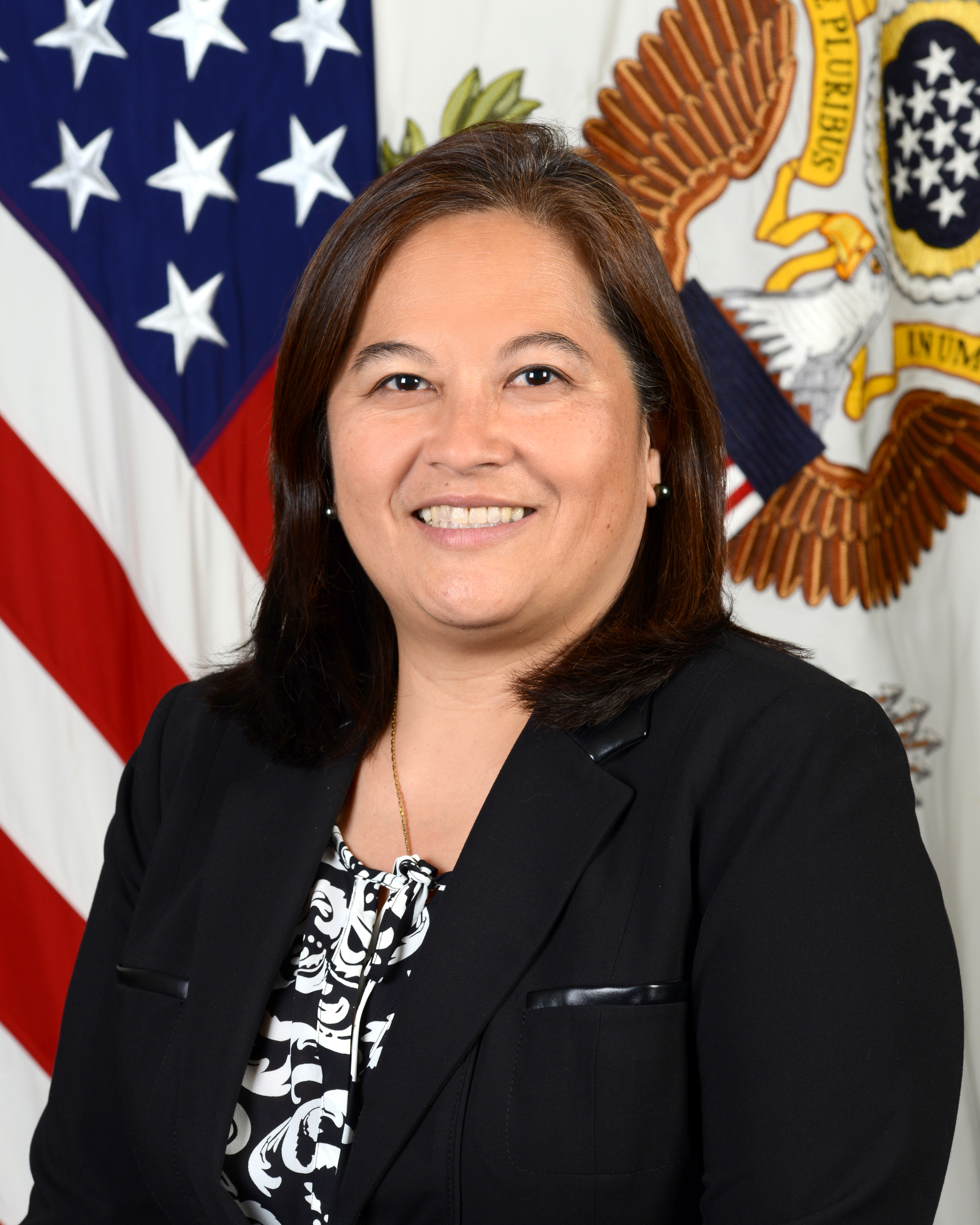

Assistant Secretary of the Army (Manpower and Reserve Affairs)
- In office October 2, 2014 – January 20, 2017
- President: Barack Obama
- Preceded by: Thomas R. Lamont
- Succeeded by: Casey Wardynski

Personal details
- Party: Democratic
- Education: Drake University (BA)

Debra S. Wada is an American government official who served as Assistant Secretary of the Army (Manpower and Reserve Affairs) during the Obama administration.

== Education ==
Wada earned a Bachelor of Arts degree in economics and political science from Drake University and a diploma from the United States Naval War College.

== Career ==
Wada worked in United States House of Representatives for more than 25 years, including as a professional staff member for the House Armed Services Committee. During her time on the committee, she served as the deputy staff director. She joined the staff of the committee's Subcommittee on Military Personnel in 1999 and was its lead staff member from 2007 to 2010. Earlier she was a legislative assistant to Senator Daniel Akaka of Hawaii from 1987 to 1990 and a legislative affairs specialist at the National Park Service.

On May 1, 2014 President Obama announced his intent to nominate Wada as the Assistant Secretary of the Army (Manpower and Reserve Affairs). She was later confirmed by a voice vote in the Senate on September 17, 2014.

Previously, Wada served as vice chair of the National Commission on Military, National, and Public Service. The commission is a congressionally-established body that was directed to assess and recommend ways to increase the number of Americans who serve in military, national and public sectors, as well as determine future requirements for the Selective Service System. On 25 March 2020, the commission released its final report. It included an amendment recommendation for the Military Selective Service Act to expand the draft registration eligibility beyond men.

Additionally, Wada served on President Joe Biden’s agency review team for the Department of Defense which was announced on 10 November 2020.

Since 2024, she has been CEO of Senshi Ame Advisors LLC, a government consulting firm and she is a board member of the Military Child Education Coalition (MCEC).
