= Leura Canary =

American lawyer

Leura Garrett Canary was the United States Attorney for the United States District Court for the Middle District of Alabama. She is married to Republican campaign consultant Bill Canary.

She graduated from Huntingdon College in 1978 and later attended University of Alabama School of Law. Before becoming a US Attorney "Leura had been a career litigator, beginning as a civil litigator in the office of the attorney general for the State of Alabama." Canary was nominated for Alabama Middle District US Attorney General by George W. Bush on August 2, 2001, and confirmed by the United States Senate on November 6, 2001.

She has come under scrutiny concerning the prosecution of Don Siegelman, a former Democratic Alabama Governor, for conflicts of interest. She eventually recused herself, and turned the prosecution over to her assistant, Middle District US Attorney Franklin.

On June 1, 2007 it became public knowledge that a Republican activist, lawyer Dana Jill Simpson of Rainsville, Alabama, filed a sworn statement suggesting Leura Canary was directed to use her office for political purposes.

Recently, as part of a broader national investigation into the Department of Justice, Congress requested documents related to the prosecution of former Governor Don Siegelman due July 28, 2007. These would include the recusal papers of Leura Canary. The DOJ has not yet complied with this request.
