= Thomas Lamont =

Thomas Lamont may refer to:

- Thomas W. Lamont (1870–1948), U.S. banker
- Thomas R. Lamont, U.S. Assistant Secretary of the Army (Manpower and Reserve Affairs) in the Obama administration
