= Gary Palmer =

American politician (born 1954)

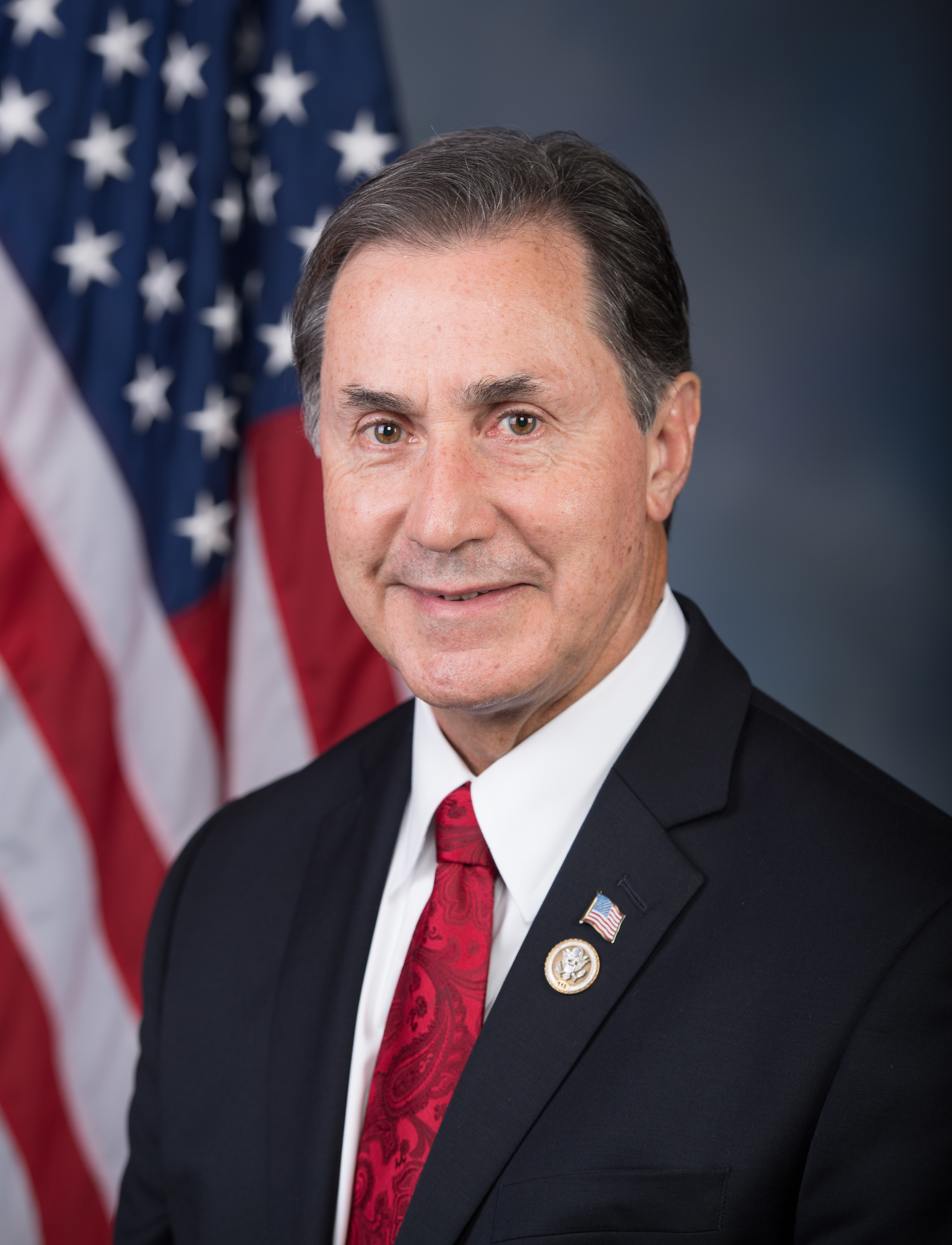
- Official portrait, 2017

Chair of the House Republican Policy Committee
- In office January 3, 2019 – January 3, 2025
- Leader: Kevin McCarthy; Mike Johnson
- Preceded by: Luke Messer
- Succeeded by: Kevin Hern

Member of the U.S. House of Representatives from Alabama's 6th district
- Incumbent
- Assumed office January 3, 2015
- Preceded by: Spencer Bachus

Personal details
- Born: Gary James Palmer; May 14, 1954 (age 72) Hackleburg, Alabama, U.S.
- Party: Republican
- Spouse: Ann Cushing
- Children: 3
- Education: University of Alabama (BS)
- Website: House website Campaign website
- Palmer's voice Palmer on the King James Bible. Recorded December 9, 2020

Gary James Palmer (born May 14, 1954) is an American politician serving as the U.S. representative for Alabama's 6th congressional district since 2015. His district includes the wealthier parts of Birmingham, as well as most of its suburbs. Before becoming an elected official, Palmer co-founded and served as the longtime president of the Alabama Policy Institute, a conservative think tank.

A member of the House Freedom Caucus, Palmer chaired the Republican Policy Committee from 2019 to 2025.

== Early life, education, and career ==
Palmer was born in Hackleburg, Alabama. His family lived on a 40-acre farm, where Palmer helped maintain the family garden and animals.

Palmer has a Bachelor of Science in operations management from the University of Alabama. He was the first member of his family to earn a college degree. He was a walk-on wide receiver for the Alabama Crimson Tide football team and played under Bear Bryant. In 1989, Palmer co-founded the Alabama Family Alliance, which later became the Alabama Policy Institute. He served as its president for 25 years, stepping down in 2014 to run for Congress. Palmer helped found the State Policy Network, a nonprofit umbrella organization for conservative and libertarian think tanks that focus on state-level policy, and served as its president.

== U.S. House of Representatives ==
=== Elections ===
==== 2014 ====
Palmer declared his candidacy for the 6th district following the retirement announcement of 11-term incumbent Spencer Bachus. In a crowded seven-way Republican primary—the real contest in this heavily Republican district—Palmer finished second behind state representative Paul DeMarco. In the ensuing runoff election, Palmer picked up the support of the Club for Growth. Despite outspending Palmer, DeMarco lost momentum after a botched debate with Palmer and never recovered. By election day, polls suggested Palmer would win the nomination by 30 points. Palmer won the runoff, 64% to 36%. In the general election, he defeated Democratic nominee Mark Lester, a history professor at Birmingham-Southern College, 76% to 24%, but he had effectively clinched a seat in Congress with his primary victory. With a Cook Partisan Voting Index of R+28, the 6th was tied with the neighboring 4th as Alabama's most Republican district.

Palmer has been reelected three times with only nominal opposition, running unopposed in 2020. He has only dropped below 70% once. In 2018, Democrat Danner Kline held him to 69.2%. Kline received 30.8% of the vote, the best showing for a Democrat in almost a quarter-century. It is the only time since the GOP began its current run in the seat in 1993 that a Democrat has managed 30% of the vote.

==== 2022 ====
Palmer ran for reelection to the House in the general election on November 8, 2022. Unchallenged in the Republican primary and with no Democratic candidates qualified to run in this district, Palmer was initially left unopposed. However, the Libertarian Party qualified for ballot access in May 2022, giving Palmer a general-election opponent, Amazon supervisor Andria Chieffo. Palmer defeated Chieffo in the general election with 83.7% of the vote to Chieffo's 15.1%.

=== Tenure ===
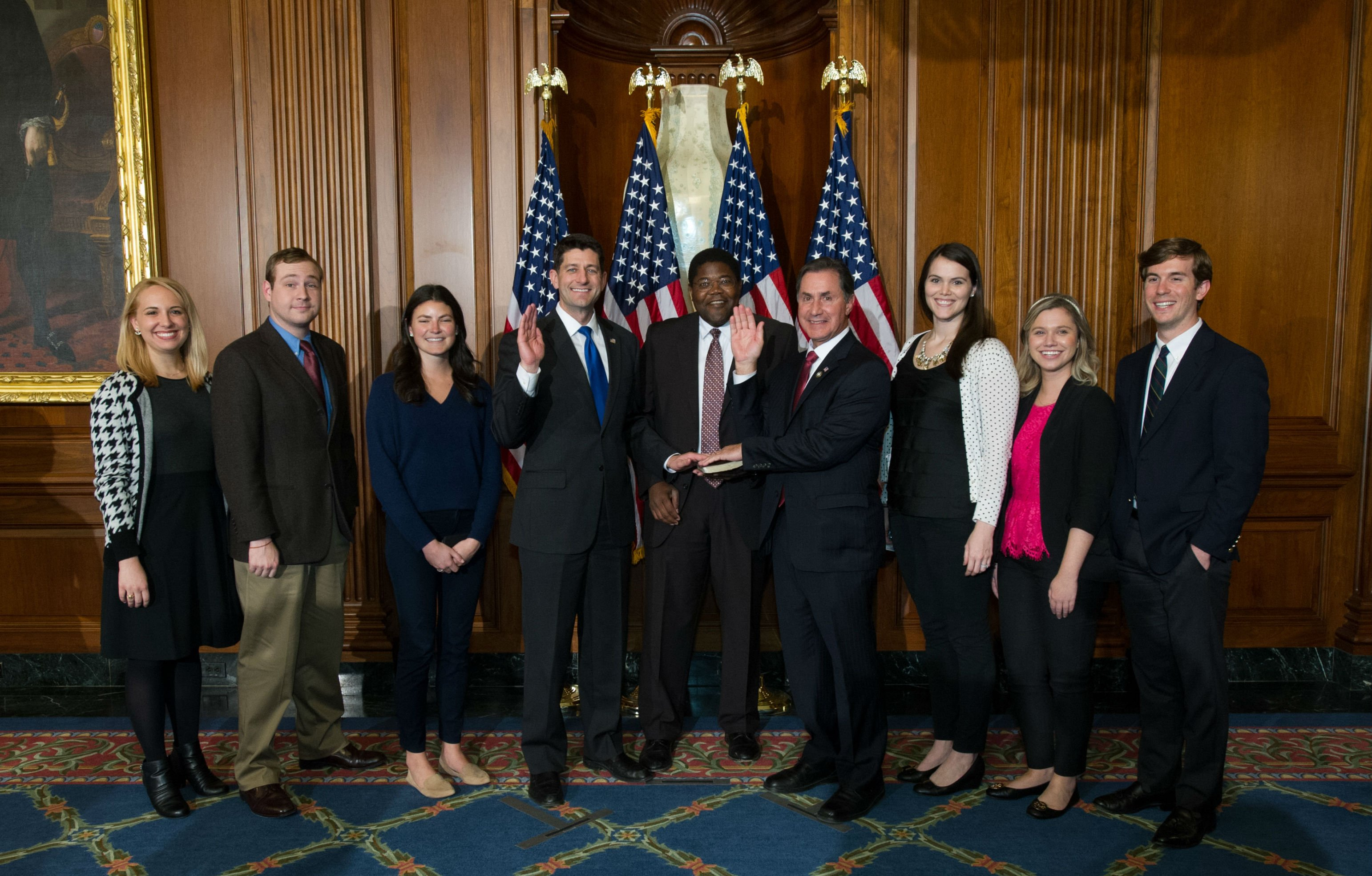
Gary Palmer's swearing in for his second term in office in 2017.

Palmer took office on January 3, 2015, along with the other freshmen members of the 114th Congress.

Palmer voted against the American Rescue Plan, an economic recovery and COVID-19 relief bill, in February 2021. His rationale for opposing the bill was that it was "not about COVID relief, but about the Democrat agenda", and a "repeat of the failed stimulus bill passed in 2009 under President Obama and then Vice President Biden."

In November 2021, Palmer touted funding for the Birmingham Northern Beltline that he added to the Infrastructure Investment and Jobs Act. But he voted against the final bill and did not mention his vote in a Twitter post celebrating the funding. Democratic figures including Alabama Democratic Party chair Christopher J. England, U.S. Senator Brian Schatz, and U.S. Representative Eric Swalwell criticized Palmer's comments as hypocritical. A spokesperson for Palmer defended the Twitter post, saying, "it should not be surprising that he supports a provision that he authored".

As of October 2021, Palmer had voted in line with President Joe Biden's stated position 7.5% of the time.

Bloomberg Government has called Palmer a "quiet lawmaker" who nonetheless fulfills an important role in shaping the House Republican agenda as chair of the Republican Policy Committee. In response to Democratic critiques that Republicans lack a policy agenda, Palmer has said he takes a more "proactive" strategy to crafting policy, rather than a "combative" style. As chair of the committee, Palmer compiled a 200-page "Guide to the Issues" for Republican representatives and frequently distributes information on policy to fellow legislators.

In February 2023, CoinDesk reported that Palmer was one of three members of Alabama's congressional delegation who received money from FTX, the defunct cryptocurrency exchange, alongside Robert Aderholt and Katie Britt. Palmer's office did not respond to a CoinDesk inquiry about what had been done with the funds.

In the October 2023 Speaker of the United States House of Representatives election, Palmer was briefly a candidate for Speaker of the House in the third nomination cycle. The New York Times described him as a candidate who could present himself as a unifying force between the battling factions of the Republican Party. He dropped out of the race for Speaker prior to an internal caucus forum.

=== Committee assignments ===
For the 118th Congress:

- Committee on Energy and Commerce
  - Subcommittee on Energy, Climate, and Grid Security
  - Subcommittee on Environment, Manufacturing, and Critical Minerals
  - Subcommittee on Oversight and Investigations
- Committee on Oversight and Accountability
  - Subcommittee on Government Operations and the Federal Workforce

=== Caucus memberships ===
- Freedom Caucus (left caucus)
- Republican Study Committee
- Congressional Western Caucus

== Political positions ==
As of 2020, Palmer has a 92% rating for supporting conservative causes, according to Heritage Action. The American Conservative Union's center for legislative accountability gave him a 97% lifetime conservative rating and the progressive PAC Americans for Democratic Action gave him a 0% liberal quotient in 2019.

=== Abortion ===
Palmer opposes legal abortion. Palmer supported the 2022 overturning of Roe v. Wade.

=== Economy ===
Palmer voted for the Tax Cuts and Jobs Act of 2017. He said the bill would "put more money in the pockets of the American people" and "launch economic growth." He blamed the Obama administration and a "burdensome tax code that was designed for a 1986 economy" for an "anemic" economy.

Palmer was among the 71 Republicans who voted against final passage of the Fiscal Responsibility Act of 2023 in the House. He was also one of three members of Alabama's House delegation to vote against the bill, the others being Barry Moore and Dale Strong.

=== LGBTQ rights ===
Palmer has stated that allowing transgender people to use the bathroom of their choice is something "no reasonable person" would allow and said that "the safety implications for sexual predation have been well documented." He opposes same-sex marriage, saying, "No one can change the fundamental nature of what marriage is: the union of a man and a woman and the formation of a family which is the foundation of every civilization."

=== COVID-19 ===
During the COVID-19 crisis, Palmer opposed proxy voting while Congress was unable to work onsite at the Capitol due to shelter-in-place orders.

=== Marijuana ===
Palmer voted to support medical marijuana research but opposes legalizing marijuana.

=== Gun law ===
Palmer supports gun rights. He opposes what he deems unconstitutional gun restrictions. He supports efforts that enable legal gun owners to carry their guns, including concealed carry, over state lines.

=== Health care ===
Palmer opposes the Affordable Care Act, calling it "a nightmare" and "job-killing." He supports efforts to repeal it.

=== Homeland security ===
Palmer is pro-nuclear weapons. He supports increasing funding for the Defense Department specifically around work in the Middle East.

=== Immigration ===
Palmer opposes illegal immigration to the United States, and supports deporting illegal immigrants.

=== Term limits ===
After his election in 2014, Palmer signed the U.S. Term Limits pledge, agreeing to sponsor legislation enacting term limits for U.S. representatives and senators. He also said he would serve no more than five terms in office. In September 2021, the U.S. Term Limits group accused Palmer of refusing to cosponsor a term limits amendment, alleging that he had broken the pledge. The group purchased billboards in Alabama's 6th congressional district attacking Palmer. Palmer's reelection campaign responded by calling the accusation "fake news", saying that the pledge only applied to the 114th Congress and that Palmer cosponsored the amendment for three consecutive terms. Palmer's five-term limit meant that the 2022 elections would be his last. But in March 2022, he said he made the pledge before becoming a part of Republican leadership in Congress and that he was also taking high turnover in Alabama's congressional delegation into consideration, indicating that he would likely run for reelection in 2024 to maintain senior leadership from Alabama, despite the commitment.

In March 2023, Palmer officially announced his 2024 reelection campaign, saying that he "prayed for God to give me clarity on" his decision to run for a sixth term. He disputed media reports (including an article by AL.com) that characterized his five-term limit as part of the U.S. Term Limits pledge, saying the pledge only applied to sponsoring legislation. But Palmer acknowledged that he did claim during his 2014 campaign that he would serve no more than five terms, and said he would "own that".

=== 2020 presidential election ===
Palmer was at the Capitol to certify the 2020 presidential election results on January 6, 2021, when the attack on the Capitol took place. During the attack, Palmer tweeted that it was a "sad day" and that "the scenes we witnessed today were unacceptable". After the attack, Palmer voted against certifying the election, objecting to Arizona's and Pennsylvania's electoral votes. On January 13, Palmer blamed Donald Trump for "sending" the attackers to the Capitol. He voted against impeaching Trump a second time, calling the second impeachment a Democratic "abuse of power" and a "sham process."

In December 2020, Palmer was one of 126 Republican members of the House of Representatives to sign an amicus brief in support of Texas v. Pennsylvania, a lawsuit filed at the United States Supreme Court contesting the results of the 2020 presidential election, in which Joe Biden defeated Trump. The Supreme Court declined to hear the case on the basis that Texas lacked standing under Article III of the Constitution to challenge the results of an election held by another state.

== Electoral history ==
Electoral history of Gary Palmer
Year	Office	Party	Primary						General			Result	Swing	Ref.
Year	Office	Party	Total	%	P.	Runoff	%	P.	Total	%	P.	Result	Swing	Ref.
2014	U.S. Representative	Republican	18,655	19.73%	2nd	47,524	63.49	1st	135,945	76.18%	1st	Won	Hold	
2016	U.S. Representative	Republican							245,313	74.52%	1st	Won	Hold	
2018	U.S. Representative	Republican							192,542	69.18%	1st	Won	Hold	
2020	U.S. Representative	Republican							274,160	97.13%	1st	Won	Hold	
2022	U.S. Representative	Republican							154,233	83.73%	1st	Won	Hold	
2024	U.S. Representative	Republican	76,488	83.2%	1st				243,741	70.32%	1st	Won	Hold	

== Personal life ==
Palmer is married to Ann Cushing Palmer. They have three children.

When working in Washington, D.C., Palmer sleeps at his office on Capitol Hill.

Palmer is a longtime member of Briarwood Presbyterian Church in Birmingham.

U.S. House of Representatives
Preceded by Spencer Bachus	Member of the U.S. House of Representatives from Alabama's 6th congressional district 2015–present	Incumbent
Party political offices
Preceded by Luke Messer	Chair of the House Republican Policy Committee; 2019–2025	Succeeded by Kevin Hern
U.S. order of precedence (ceremonial)
Preceded by Dan Newhouse	United States representatives by seniority 142nd	Succeeded by David Rouzer
