= Alabama Policy Institute =

Nonprofit think tank in Birmingham, Alabama

- Founders: Tom Parker, Gary Palmer
- Established: 1989; 37 years ago
- President: Stephanie Smith
- Budget: Revenue: $728,909; Expenses: $802,620 (FYE June 2024)
- Address: 1200 Corporate Drive, Suite 170 Birmingham, AL 35242
- Coordinates: 33.4774°N 86.7773°W
- Interactive map of Alabama Policy Institute
- Website: www.alabamapolicy.org

The Alabama Policy Institute (API) is a nonprofit think tank headquartered in Birmingham, Alabama. According to the organization's mission statement, API seeks "to improve the lives of Alabamians through public policy that honors the principles of free markets, limited government, and strong families."

== History ==
The Alabama Policy Institute was founded in 1989 as the Alabama Family Alliance. Alabama Supreme Court justice Tom Parker was the founding executive director. Gary Palmer, a co-founder of the Alabama Family Alliance, eventually became its president. In 2000, the Alabama Family Alliance was renamed the Alabama Policy Institute.

After 25 years at the helm, Palmer stepped down from his role as the institute's president in order to successfully run Alabama's 6th congressional district in 2014. He was replaced by Caleb Crosby, who had served as API's vice president and CFO prior to becoming the group's president in September 2014. On January 25, 2023, Stephanie Smith succeeded Caleb Crosby as API's third President and CEO. Her professional experience includes serving as Director of Governmental Affairs for Regions Financial Corporation, President of the Opelika Chamber of Commerce, Assistant Director of Finance for the State of Alabama, Deputy Director of Finance for the State of Alabama, and as Principal of the Thatcher Coalition.

== Policy positions ==
API researches policy issues and offers analysis and proposals through reports and publications to public servants, citizens, and the media. As a conservative think tank, API addresses a range of policy issues in the areas of economics, education, the environment, government, family and society.

API has argued for what they consider to be fairer taxes in Alabama. In 2003, API was a staunch opponent of Republican governor Bob Riley's $1.2 billion tax increase proposal. It commissioned a study by the Beacon Hill Institute about Riley's tax increase legislation. API has been a critic of proposals for an Alabama state lottery, labeling such proposals a regressive tax on the poor.

API has championed charter schools in Alabama. It strongly supports the Alabama Accountability Act, which expanded school choice and school vouchers in the state. API was a proponent of both the Marriage Act, passed in 1998, and Alabama Amendment 774, which was approved by 81% of Alabama voters in 2006.

In 2014, API released a report titled Alabama's Environment 2014: Six Critical Indicators. It covered energy, air quality, water quality, forests and land, toxic release inventory and climate change. It provided a positive outlook on the state of the environment, arguing that the nation's air quality and the environment in general are improving.

In February 2015, the Alabama Policy Institute and the Alabama Citizens Action Program filed a lawsuit asking the Alabama Supreme Court to halt same-sex marriages in the state until the United States Supreme Court addresses the issue.

API is a member of the advisory board of Project 2025, a collection of conservative and right-wing policy proposals from the Heritage Foundation to reshape the United States federal government and consolidate executive power should the Republican nominee win the 2024 presidential election.

== See also ==
- List of contributors to Project 2025
