= Will Brooke (businessman) =

American businessman

- Born: William W. Brooke; April 5, 1957 (age 68); Birmingham, Alabama
- Spouse: Maggie Brooke

William W. Brooke (born April 5, 1957) is the executive vice president and managing partner of Harbert Management Corporation in Birmingham, Alabama. He was one of seven candidates who ran for the Republican Party nomination in the 2014 US House of Representatives primary in the Alabama's 6th district, placing fifth.

== Early life and education ==
A native of Alabama, Will Brooke grew up around Birmingham and attended public schools. He graduated from the University of Alabama in 1978 with a Bachelor of Science in business administration. He then continued his education, receiving a Juris Doctor degree in law from the university in 1981.

Since completing his education, Brooke has been a visiting lecturer at the MBA and undergraduate programs at the University of Alabama, where he is a member of the Alabama Entrepreneurship Council as of 2014.

== Career ==
=== Legal career ===
After graduating from the University of Alabama, Brooke practiced law in the Birmingham and Homewood areas for 10 years. He was the founder and managing partner for Wallace, Jordan, Ratliff and Brandt (originally, Wallace, Brooke & Byers).

=== Business career ===
In August 1991, Brooke joined the Harbert Corporation as vice president and general counsel. In 1993, along with Raymond Harbert, he co-founded Harbert Management Corporation, an asset management firm, where he served as chief operating officer from 1995 to 2001. As of 2014, he was serving as the firm's executive vice president and managing partner, and was responsible for its venture capital funds. Brooke is also the chairman of Harbert Management Corporation's Birmingham-based Harbert Realty Services.

=== Politics ===
In 2014, Brooke ran for the Republican Party nomination in the 2014 US House of Representatives primary in the Alabama's 6th district. He ran on a platform of cutting spending, specifically targeting "the planned economy disaster called Obamacare". When Brooke entered the race, he was expected to be a strong contender due to his fundraising experience and personal wealth. A few days before the primary, he was endorsed by former governor Bob Riley. Even so, Brooke was unable to separate from the pack and placed 5th of the 7 candidates. He won 14% of the vote, short of the 20% he would have needed to finish second and advance to a runoff for the nomination.

While he had not previously pursued an elected office, Brooke had been active in political and civic activity in the state of Alabama. In the 1990s, he was involved with successful efforts to reform the Alabama Supreme Court. In 2010, Brooke served as the chairman of ProgressPAC which played a significant role in the electing the first Republican majority in the Alabama State Legislature in over 100 years.

In 2011, Brooke was the chairman of the Business Council of Alabama when numerous pieces of conservative legislation and reforms were passed by the Alabama legislature, including ethics reform, tenure reform, public pension reform, tort reform and state budget reform. During his chairmanship the Council's CEO was Bill Canary.

Brooke is reported to have gifted an investment plan worth tens of thousands of dollars to Mike Hubbard's printing business, after Hubbard became Speaker of the Alabama House of Representatives. Brooke wired Hubbard $150,000 in October 2012. Hubbard assured Brooke that he would make sure the state would direct federal welfare funds to a charity run by Brooke's wife. Brooke had to testify at Hubbard's trial. Hubbard was convicted on 12 counts of felony ethics violations, including charges related to Brooke's gifts.

== Organizations ==
Brooke is on the board of the Economic Development Partnership of Alabama, the Alabama Southeast BIO, and Birmingham's Innovation Depot. He was formerly the chairman of the Alabama Innovation Council. Along with being a Rotarian, he is a member of Leadership Alabama, the Society of International Business Fellows and the Federalist Society.

Brooke has served on the boards of a number of corporations, including Atherotech, Aldagen Holdings, Emageon, Innovative BioSensor, MaxCyte, Nationwide Homes, nContact Surgical, NovaMin Technologies, Optimal IMX, and Visador.

== Personal life ==
Will Brooke is married to Maggie Brooke; the couple have 3 adult children. As a member of Covenant Presbyterian Church in Homewood, Brooke has taken has served as a deacon, elder, trustee, and also as a children's and adult Sunday school teacher. He also serves on the board of directors for Church Resource Ministries, a global missions organization located in Anaheim, CA.
