= James C. Fields =

American politician

Member of the Alabama House of Representatives from the 12th district
- In office 2008–2010
- Succeeded by: Mac Buttram

Personal details
- Party: Democratic
- Spouse: Yvette Fields
- Children: 7
- Education: Jacksonville State University

James C. Fields Jr. is an American civil servant and minister in the United Methodist Church who served in the Alabama House of Representatives from 2008 until 2010. A native of Colony, Alabama, Fields was the first African American to be a candidate for elective office in Cullman County, Alabama, which is predominantly white.

== Early life and education ==
James Fields grew up on his family's small farm in Colony. After graduating from Hanceville High School, he attended Jacksonville State University, where he obtained a bachelor's degree in law enforcement.

== Military service ==
Subsequently, he served in the U.S. Marines, attending officer training at the Marine Corps Academy in Quantico, Virginia, and leaving with an honorable discharge.

== Alabama House of Representatives ==
James Fields was elected as a Democratic member of the Alabama House of Representatives in a special election on January 29, 2008. He was defeated for reelection in 2010 by fellow Methodist minister Mac Buttram.

== Personal life ==
James Fields and his wife Yvette have seven children and 13 grandchildren.

James Fields has worked for the Alabama Department of Industrial Relations for nearly three decades and is a minister at St. James United Methodist Church in Irondale, Alabama.

== Elections ==
In November 2013, James Fields announced that he would be a candidate for Lieutenant Governor of Alabama in the 2014 elections. He ran in the Democratic primary uncontested and was defeated by incumbent Republican Lieutenant Governor Kay Ivey in the general election.

== Electoral history ==
2010 Alabama House of Representatives Election, District 12
Party	Candidate	Votes	%
Republican	Mac Buttram	9,062	54.10%
Democratic	James C. Fields	7,667	45.78%
	Write in	20	0.12%
Total votes		16,749	100
Republican gain from Democratic			

2014 Alabama Lieutenant Gubernatorial Election
Party	Candidate	Votes	%	±%
Republican	Kay Ivey (incumbent)	738,090	63.23%	+11.76%
Democratic	James C. Fields	428,007	36.67%	−11.73%
	Write in	1,146	0.01%	−0.12%
Total votes		1,167,243	100%	
Republican hold				

Party political offices
Preceded by Jim Folsom Jr.	Democratic nominee for Lieutenant Governor of Alabama; 2014	Succeeded by Will Boyd
