= 2014 United States House of Representatives elections in Alabama =

- November 4, 2014

All 7 Alabama seats to the United States House of Representatives
	Majority party	Minority party
Party	Republican	Democratic
Last election	6	1
Seats won	6	1
Seat change	Steady	Steady
Popular vote	704,533	331,764
Percentage	65.18%	30.69%
Swing	▲1.38%	▼5.18%

Republican
50–60%
60–70%
70–80%
80–90%
>90%
Democratic
50–60%
60–70%
70–80%
80–90%
>90%

The 2014 United States House of Representatives elections in Alabama took place on November 4, 2014. Voters elected the 7 U.S. representatives from the state of Alabama. The elections coincided with the elections of other offices, including the Governor of Alabama.

Primary elections were held on June 3, 2014. Primary runoffs, necessary if no candidate won a majority of the vote, were held on July 15.

== Overview ==
Results of the 2014 United States House of Representatives elections in Alabama by district:

District	Republican		Democratic		Others		Total		Result
District	Votes	%	Votes	%	Votes	%	Votes	%	Result
District 1	103,758	68.16%	48,278	31.71%	198	0.13%	152,234	100.0%	Republican hold
District 2	113,103	67.34%	54,692	32.56%	157	0.09%	167,952	100.0%	Republican hold
District 3	103,558	63.72%	52,816	36.22%	246	0.06%	156,620	100.0%	Republican hold
District 4	132,831	98.57%	0	0.00%	1,921	1.43%	134,752	100.0%	Republican hold
District 5	115,338	74.42%	0	0.00%	39,636	25.58%	154,974	100.0%	Republican hold
District 6	135,945	76.18%	42,291	23.70%	213	0.12%	178,449	100.0%	Republican hold
District 7	0	0.00%	133,687	98.37%	2,212	1.63%	135,899	100.0%	Democratic hold
Total	704,533	65.18%	331,764	30.69%	44,583	4.13%	1,080,880	100.0%	

== District 1 ==
2014 Alabama's 1st congressional district election
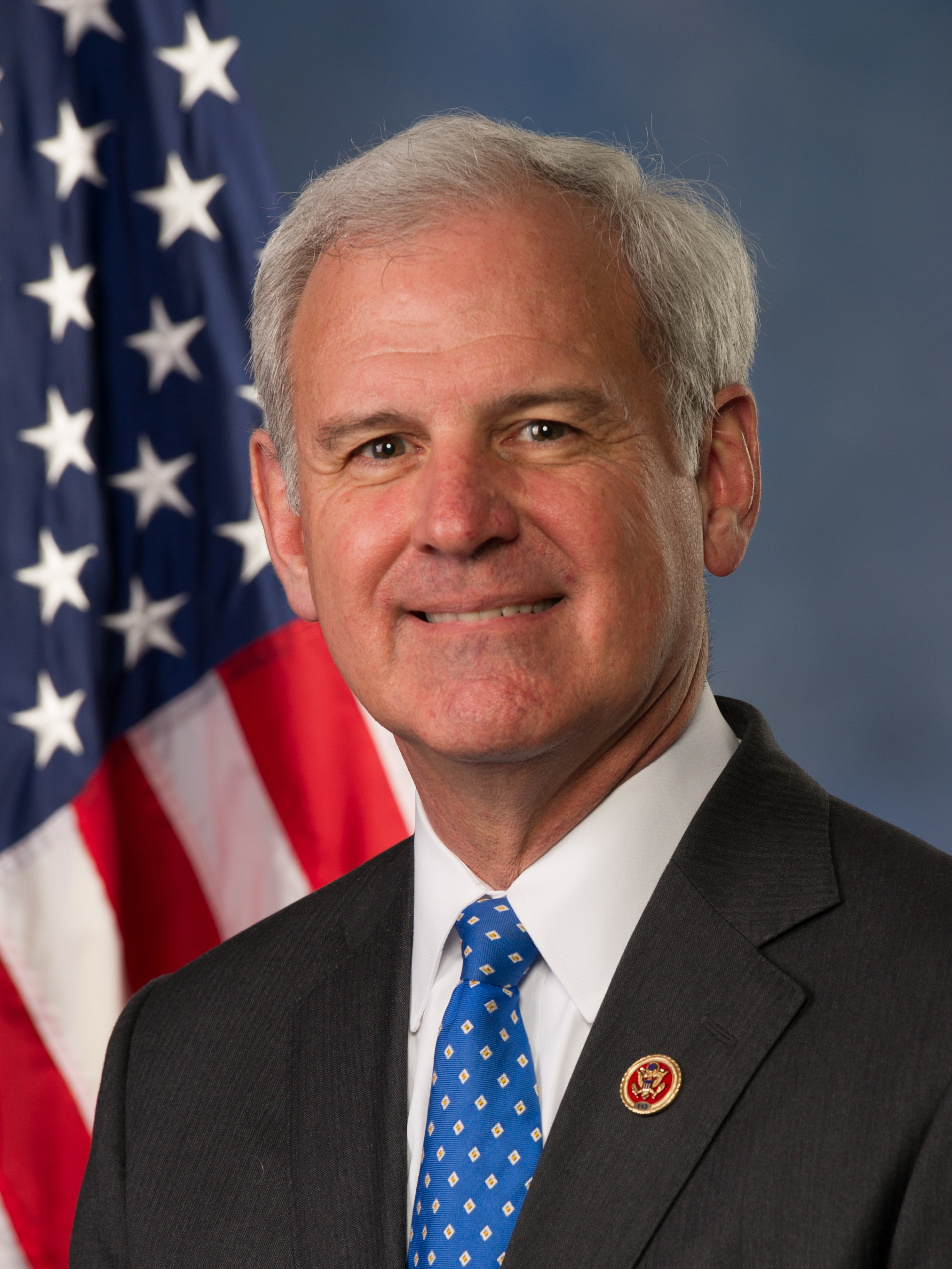

Nominee	Bradley Byrne	Burton LeFlore
Party	Republican	Democratic
Popular vote	103,758	48,278
Percentage	68.2%	31.7%
U.S. Representative before election
Bradley Byrne
Republican
Elected U.S. Representative
Bradley Byrne
Republican

Republican incumbent Bradley Byrne, who had represented the district since a December 2013 special election, ran for re-election.

=== Republican primary ===
==== Candidates ====
===== Nominee =====
- Bradley Byrne, incumbent U.S. Representative

=== Democratic primary ===
==== Candidates ====
===== Nominee =====
- Burton LeFlore, real estate agent and nominee for this seat in 2013

=== General election ===
==== Predictions ====
Source	Ranking	As of
The Cook Political Report	Safe R	November 3, 2014
Rothenberg	Safe R	October 24, 2014
Sabato's Crystal Ball	Safe R	October 30, 2014
RCP	Safe R	November 2, 2014
Daily Kos Elections	Safe R	November 4, 2014

==== Campaign ====
Byrne was originally believed to be running for re-election unopposed, but LeFlore managed to qualify.

==== Results ====
Alabama's 1st congressional district, 2014
Party	Candidate	Votes	%
Republican	Bradley Byrne (incumbent)	103,758	68.2
Democratic	Burton LeFlore	48,278	31.7
n/a	Write-ins	198	0.1
Total votes		152,234	100.0
Republican hold			

== District 2 ==
2014 Alabama's 2nd congressional district election
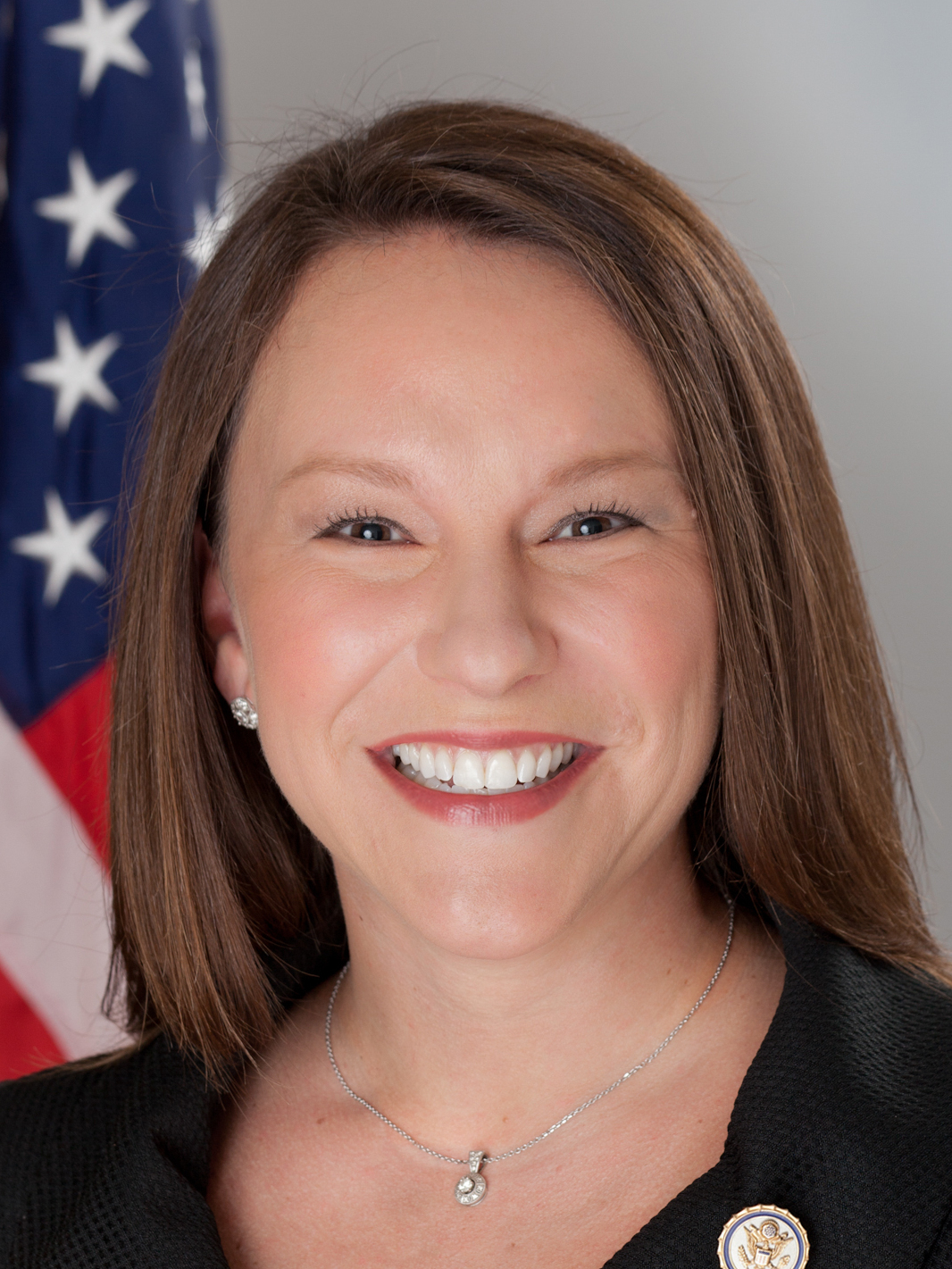

Nominee	Martha Roby	Erick Wright
Party	Republican	Democratic
Popular vote	113,103	54,692
Percentage	67.3%	32.6%
U.S. Representative before election
Martha Roby
Republican
Elected U.S. Representative
Martha Roby
Republican

Republican incumbent Martha Roby, who had represented the district since 2011, ran for re-election.

=== Republican primary ===
==== Candidates ====
===== Nominee =====
- Martha Roby, incumbent U.S. Representative

=== Democratic primary ===
==== Candidates ====
===== Nominee =====
- Erick Wright

=== General election ===
==== Predictions ====
Source	Ranking	As of
The Cook Political Report	Safe R	November 3, 2014
Rothenberg	Safe R	October 24, 2014
Sabato's Crystal Ball	Safe R	October 30, 2014
RCP	Safe R	November 2, 2014
Daily Kos Elections	Safe R	November 4, 2014

==== Results ====
Alabama's 2nd congressional district, 2014
Party	Candidate	Votes	%
Republican	Martha Roby (incumbent)	113,103	67.3
Democratic	Erick Wright	54,692	32.6
n/a	Write-ins	157	0.1
Total votes		167,952	100.0
Republican hold			

== District 3 ==
2014 Alabama's 3rd congressional district election
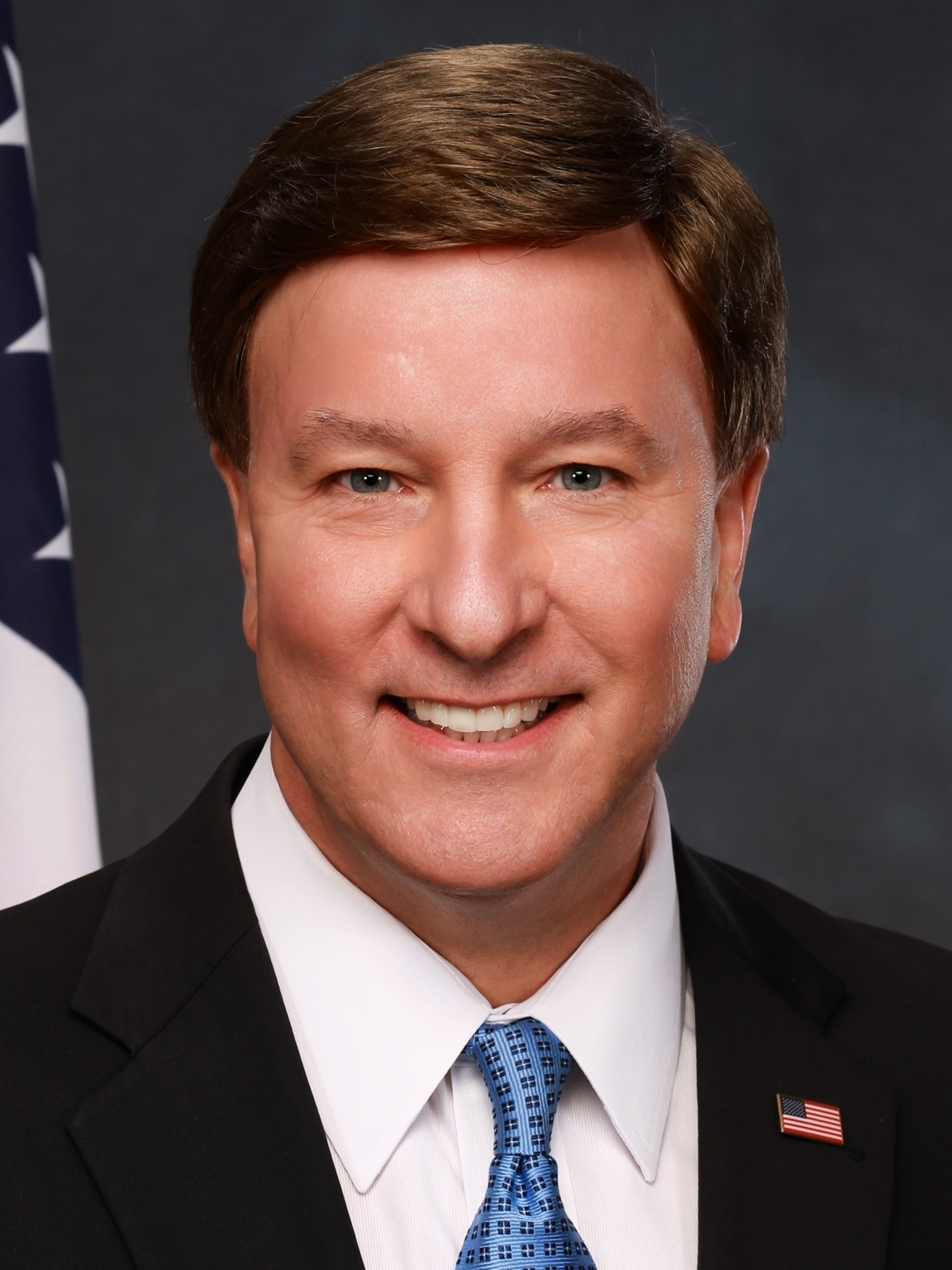

Nominee	Mike D. Rogers	Jesse Smith
Party	Republican	Democratic
Popular vote	103,558	52,816
Percentage	66.1%	33.7%
U.S. Representative before election
Mike D. Rogers
Republican
Elected U.S. Representative
Mike D. Rogers
Republican

Republican incumbent Mike Rogers, who had represented the district since 2003, ran for re-election.

=== Republican primary ===
==== Candidates ====
===== Nominee =====
- Mike Rogers, incumbent U.S. Representative

===== Eliminated in primary =====
- Thomas Casson

==== Results ====
Republican primary results
Party	Candidate	Votes	%
Republican	Mike Rogers (incumbent)	50,372	75.9
Republican	Thomas Casson	15,999	24.1
Total votes		66,371	100.0

=== Democratic primary ===
==== Candidates ====
===== Nominee =====
- Jesse T. Smith, U.S. Army veteran

=== General election ===
==== Predictions ====
Source	Ranking	As of
The Cook Political Report	Safe R	November 3, 2014
Rothenberg	Safe R	October 24, 2014
Sabato's Crystal Ball	Safe R	October 30, 2014
RCP	Safe R	November 2, 2014
Daily Kos Elections	Safe R	November 4, 2014

==== Results ====
Alabama's 3rd congressional district, 2014
Party	Candidate	Votes	%
Republican	Mike D. Rogers (incumbent)	103,558	66.1
Democratic	Jesse Smith	52,816	33.7
n/a	Write-ins	246	0.2
Total votes		156,620	100.0
Republican hold			

== District 4 ==
2014 Alabama's 4th congressional district election
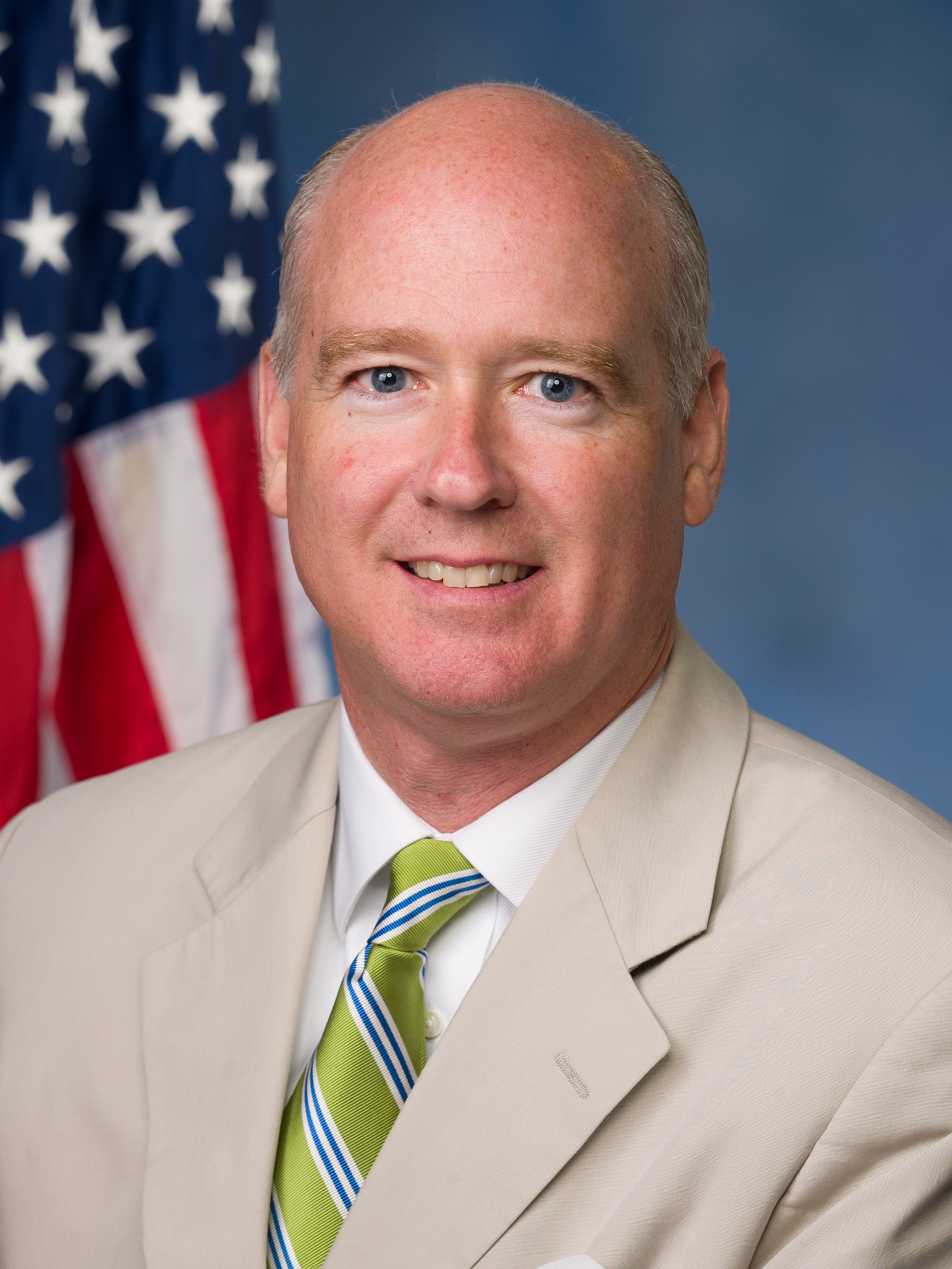
Nominee	Robert Aderholt
Party	Republican
Popular vote	132,831
Percentage	98.6%
U.S. Representative before election
Robert Aderholt
Republican
Elected U.S. Representative
Robert Aderholt
Republican

Republican incumbent Robert Aderholt, who had represented the district since 1997, ran for re-election.

=== Republican primary ===
==== Candidates ====
===== Nominee =====
- Robert Aderholt, incumbent U.S. Representative

===== Withdrawn =====
- Thomas E. Drake II

=== Democratic primary ===
No Democrats filed for the office.

=== General election ===
==== Predictions ====
Source	Ranking	As of
The Cook Political Report	Safe R	November 3, 2014
Rothenberg	Safe R	October 24, 2014
Sabato's Crystal Ball	Safe R	October 30, 2014
RCP	Safe R	November 2, 2014
Daily Kos Elections	Safe R	November 4, 2014

==== Results ====
Alabama's 4th congressional district, 2014
Party	Candidate	Votes	%
Republican	Robert Aderholt (incumbent)	132,831	98.6
n/a	Write-ins	1,921	1.4
Total votes		134,752	100.0
Republican hold			

== District 5 ==
2014 Alabama's 5th congressional district election
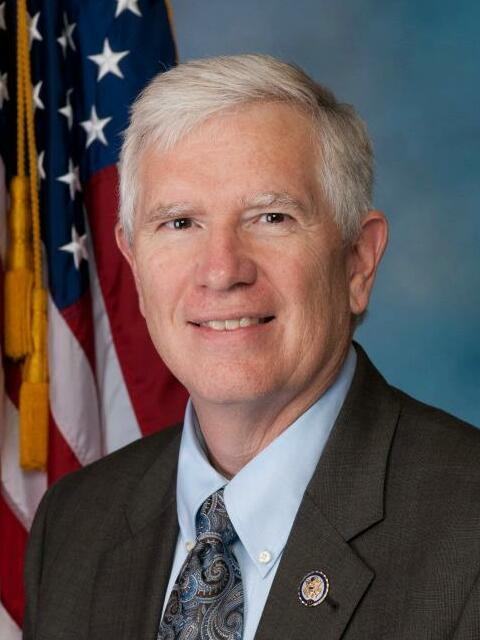

Nominee	Mo Brooks	Mark Bray
Party	Republican	Independent
Popular vote	115,338	39,005
Percentage	74.4%	25.2%
- County results Brooks: 70–80% 80–90%
U.S. Representative before election
Mo Brooks
Republican
Elected U.S. Representative
Mo Brooks
Republican

Republican incumbent Mo Brooks, who had represented the district since 2011, ran for re-election.

=== Republican primary ===
Brooks had defeated the then incumbent Democrat-turned-Republican Parker Griffith, in the 2010 Republican primary and again in 2012. Supporters of Griffith circulated petitions to get him on the ballot as an independent. He considered doing so, but instead re-joined the Democratic Party and ran for Governor.

==== Candidates ====
===== Nominee =====
- Mo Brooks, incumbent U.S. Representative

===== Eliminated in primary =====
- Jerry Hill

===== Declined =====
- Parker Griffith, former U.S. Representative

==== Results ====
Republican primary results
Party	Candidate	Votes	%
Republican	Mo Brooks (incumbent)	49,117	80.3
Republican	Jerry Hill	12,038	19.7
Total votes		61,155	100.0

=== Democratic primary ===
==== Candidates ====
No Democrats filed to run.

===== Declined =====
- Parker Griffith, former U.S. Representative

=== General election ===
Mark Bray challenged Brooks as an independent candidate, with Reggie Hill running as a write-in candidate.

==== Predictions ====
Source	Ranking	As of
The Cook Political Report	Safe R	November 3, 2014
Rothenberg	Safe R	October 24, 2014
Sabato's Crystal Ball	Safe R	October 30, 2014
RCP	Safe R	November 2, 2014
Daily Kos Elections	Safe R	November 4, 2014

==== Results ====
Alabama's 5th congressional district, 2014
Party	Candidate	Votes	%
Republican	Mo Brooks (incumbent)	115,338	74.4
Independent	Mark Bray	39,005	25.2
n/a	Write-ins	631	0.4
Total votes		154,974	100.0
Republican hold			

== District 6 ==
2014 Alabama's 6th congressional district election
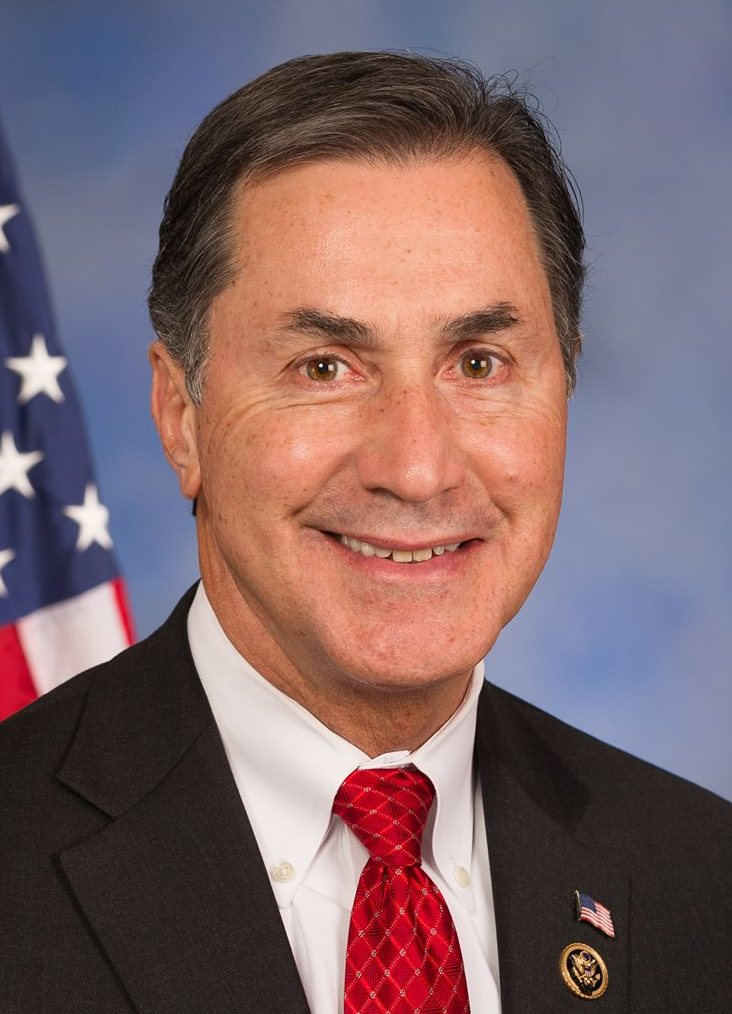

Nominee	Gary Palmer	Paul DeMarco
Party	Republican	Republican
Popular vote	47,491	27,295
Percentage	63.5%	36.5%
U.S. Representative before election
Spencer Bachus
Republican
Elected U.S. Representative
Gary Palmer
Republican

Republican incumbent Spencer Bachus, who had represented the 6th district since 1993, did not run for re-election.

=== Republican primary ===
==== Candidates ====
===== Nominee =====
- Gary Palmer, president of the conservative think tank Alabama Policy Institute

===== Eliminated in primary =====
- Scott Beason, state senator and candidate for this seat in 2012
- Will Brooke, executive vice president and managing partner of Harbert Management Corporation
- Paul DeMarco, state representative
- Chad Mathis, orthopedic surgeon
- Robert Shattuck, attorney
- Tom Vigneulle, businessman

===== Declined =====
- Bill Armistead, chairman of the Alabama Republican Party and former state senator
- Spencer Bachus, incumbent U.S. Representative
- Slade Blackwell, state senator
- Greg Canfield, Secretary of the Alabama Department of Commerce and former state representative
- David Carrington, president of the Jefferson County Commission
- Steve French, former state senator
- Tony Petelos, Jefferson County Manager
- Rob Riley, attorney and son of former governor Riley
- Minda Riley Campbell, attorney and daughter of former governor Bob Riley
- Cliff Sims, blogger
- David Standridge, state representative and candidate for this seat in 2012
- Cam Ward, state senator
- Jack Williams, state representative

==== Polling ====
Poll source	Date(s) administered	Sample size	Margin of error	Scott Beason	Will Brooke	Paul DeMarco	Chad Mathis	Gary Palmer	Tom Vignuelle	Undecided
Cygnal	May 2014	–	–	12%	11%	20%	17%	18%	3%	19%
JMC Analytics (R-Mathis)	April 15 & 17, 2014	445	± 4.6%	9%	10%	15%	16%	4%	2%	44%

==== Results ====
Republican primary results
Party	Candidate	Votes	%
Republican	Paul DeMarco	30,894	32.7
Republican	Gary Palmer	18,655	19.7
Republican	Scott Beason	14,451	15.3
Republican	Chad Mathis	14,420	15.3
Republican	Will Brooke	13,130	13.9
Republican	Tom Vigneulle	2,397	2.5
Republican	Robert Shattuck	587	0.5
Total votes		94,534	100.0

DeMarco and Palmer advanced to a July 15 runoff election to decide the Republican primary.

==== Runoff ====
===== Polling =====
Poll source	Date(s) administered	Sample size	Margin of error	Paul DeMarco	Gary Palmer	Undecided
Cygnal	July 7–8, 2014	647	± 3.84%	29%	60%	11%

===== Results =====
Republican primary runoff results
Party	Candidate	Votes	%
Republican	Gary Palmer	47,491	63.5
Republican	Paul DeMarco	27,295	36.5
Total votes		74,786	100.0

=== Democratic primary ===
==== Candidates ====
===== Nominee =====
- Avery Vise, businessman

=== General election ===
==== Campaign ====
Palmer faced Democrat Mark Lester, a professor at Birmingham-Southern College who replaced original nominee Avery Vise.

Robert Shattuck, who lost in the Republican primary, ran as a write-in candidate.

Libertarian Aimee Love had been running, but the Alabama Libertarian Party was unable to secure ballot access for federal elections.

==== Predictions ====
Source	Ranking	As of
The Cook Political Report	Safe R	November 3, 2014
Rothenberg	Safe R	October 24, 2014
Sabato's Crystal Ball	Safe R	October 30, 2014
RCP	Safe R	November 2, 2014
Daily Kos Elections	Safe R	November 4, 2014

==== Results ====
Alabama's 6th congressional district, 2014
Party	Candidate	Votes	%
Republican	Gary Palmer	135,945	76.2
Democratic	Mark Lester	42,291	23.7
n/a	Write-ins	213	0.1
Total votes		178,449	100.0
Republican hold			

== District 7 ==
2014 Alabama's 7th congressional district election
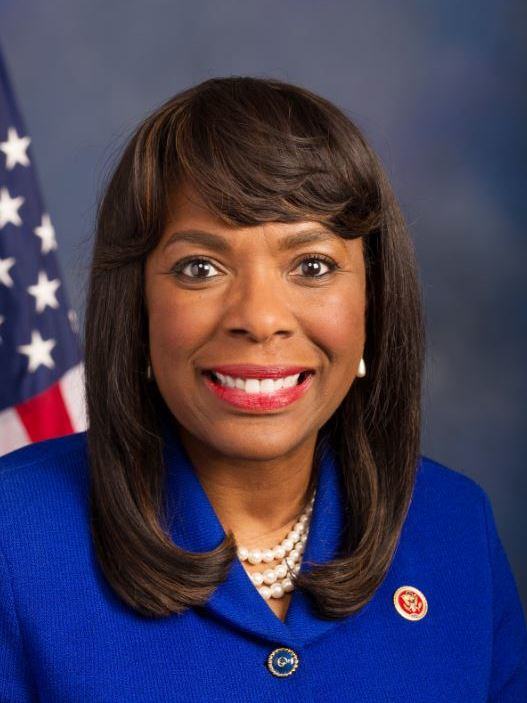
Nominee	Terri Sewell
Party	Democratic
Popular vote	133,687
Percentage	98.4%
U.S. Representative before election
Terri Sewell
Democratic
Elected U.S. Representative
Terri Sewell
Democratic

Democratic incumbent Terri Sewell, who had represented the district since 2011, ran for re-election.

=== Democratic primary ===
==== Candidates ====
===== Nominee =====
- Terri Sewell, incumbent U.S. Representative

===== Eliminated in primary =====
- Tamara Harris Johnson, former Birmingham City Attorney

==== Results ====
Democratic primary results
Party	Candidate	Votes	%
Democratic	Terri Sewell (incumbent)	74,953	83.9
Democratic	Tamara Harris Johnson	14,374	16.1
Total votes		89,327	100.0

=== Republican primary ===
No Republicans filed to run for the office.

=== General election ===
==== Predictions ====
Source	Ranking	As of
The Cook Political Report	Safe D	November 3, 2014
Rothenberg	Safe D	October 24, 2014
Sabato's Crystal Ball	Safe D	October 30, 2014
RCP	Safe D	November 2, 2014
Daily Kos Elections	Safe D	November 4, 2014

==== Results ====
Alabama's 7th congressional district, 2014
Party	Candidate	Votes	%
Democratic	Terri Sewell (incumbent)	133,687	98.4
n/a	Write-ins	2,212	1.6
Total votes		135,899	100.0
Democratic hold			
