= Casey Wardynski =

American government official (born 1957)

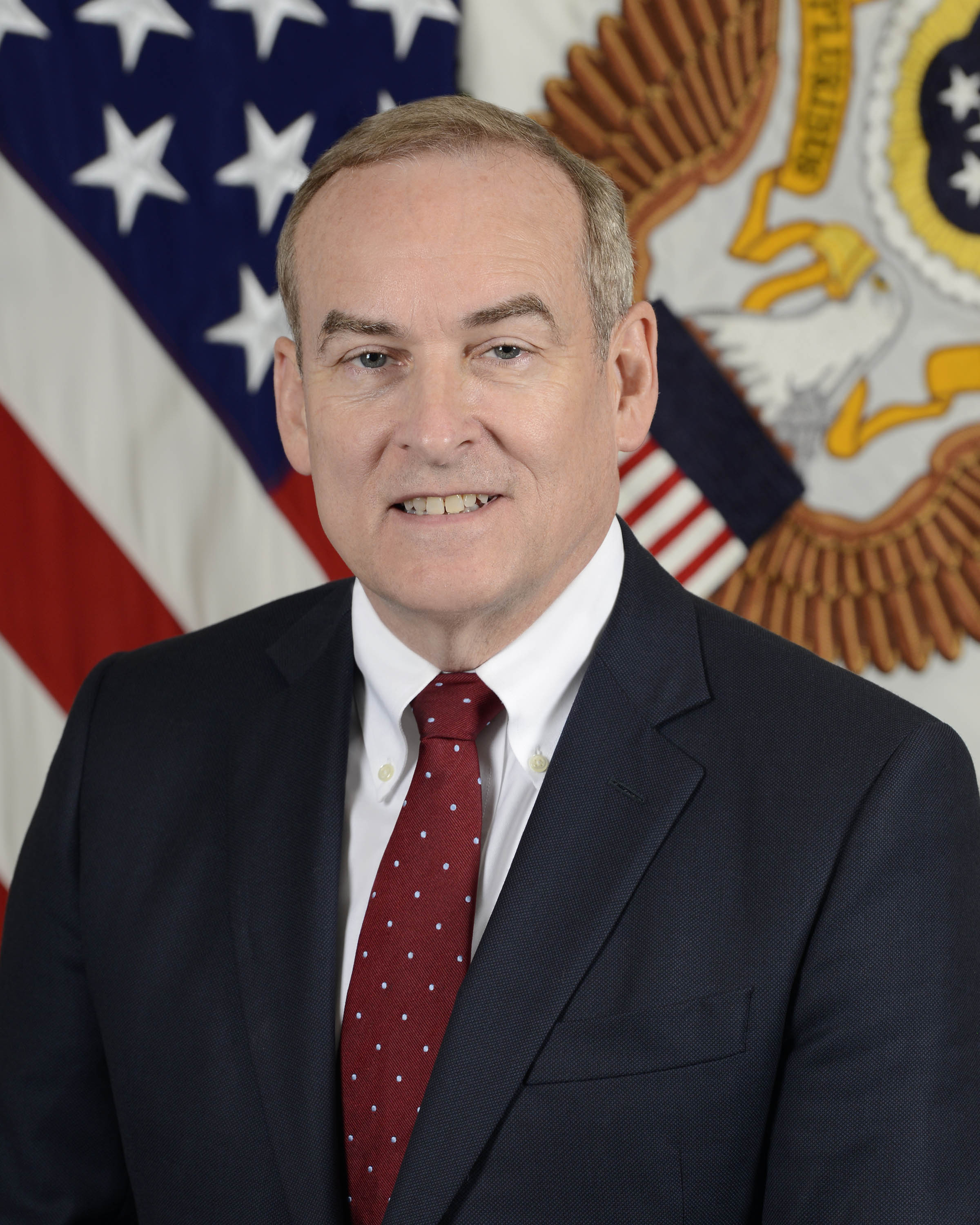

Assistant Secretary of the Army for Manpower and Reserve Affairs
- In office January 16, 2019 – January 20, 2021
- President: Donald Trump
- Preceded by: Debra S. Wada
- Succeeded by: Agnes G. Schaefer

Personal details
- Born: September 3, 1957 (age 68) Fort Worth, Texas, U.S.
- Party: Republican
- Education: United States Military Academy (BS); Harvard University (MPP); RAND Graduate School (PhD)

Military service
- Allegiance: United States
- Branch/service: United States Army
- Years of service: 1980–2010
- Rank: Colonel

Eugene Casey Wardynski (born September 3, 1957) is an American government official, business executive, educator, and political candidate who was Assistant Secretary of the Army (Manpower and Reserve Affairs).

== Early life and education ==
Wardynski was born in Fort Worth, Texas. He earned a Bachelor of Science from the United States Military Academy, a Master of Public Policy from the Harvard Kennedy School, and a PhD in policy analysis (economics, statistics, and decision making) from the Frederick S. Pardee RAND Graduate School.

== Career ==
Wardynski served in the United States Army from 1980 to 2010, including as an operations officer. He retired from the Army with the rank of colonel. Wardynski was also a professor of economics at the United States Military Academy and was the director of the school's office of economic and manpower analysis. In 1999, Wardynski developed the idea of America's Army, a first-person shooter video game series designed as an Army recruitment tool. Wardynski was the CFO of Aurora Public Schools in Aurora, Colorado before becoming superintendent of the Huntsville City Schools in Huntsville, Alabama. Outside of education, Wardynski also worked as the CFO and CEO of FISH Technologies, LLC.

Wardynski was nominated as Assistant Secretary of the Army (Manpower and Reserve Affairs) by President Donald Trump and was confirmed to the position on January 2, 2019. Wardynski resigned from his position on the last day of the Trump administration, January 20, 2021.

In April 2021, he declared his candidacy for Alabama's 5th congressional district in the 2022 election.

Wardynski is the CEO of Regenesis Stem Cell Center in Huntsville, Alabama.
