= 2026 United States House of Representatives elections in Alabama =

- November 3, 2026

All 7 Alabama seats to the United States House of Representatives
- Reporting: 98.9% as of Nov 9 at 11:23 AM CST
	Majority party	Minority party
Party	Republican	Democratic
Last election	5	2
Seats before	5	2
Seats after	5	2
Seat change	Steady	Steady
Popular vote	914,968	763,464
Percentage	54.51%	45.49%
Swing	▼19.15%	▲20.20%

Republican:
50–60%
60–70%
70–80%
80–90%
Democratic:
50–60%
60–70%
70–80%
80–90%

The 2026 United States House of Representatives elections in Alabama were held on November 3, 2026, to elect the seven U.S. representatives from the state of Alabama, one from all seven of the state's congressional districts. The elections will coincide with other elections to the House of Representatives, elections to the United States Senate, and various state and local elections. The primary elections were held on May 19, and in races where no candidate received over 50% in a primary, runoff elections took place on June 16. Special primary elections were held on August 11 in districts that were affected by the new congressional map following redistricting in May.

This election will take place alongside races for U.S. Senate, governor, state senate, state house, and numerous other state and local offices.

== Redistricting and special primaries ==
District lines passed by the Alabama Legislature in May 2026 after Louisiana v. Callais for the 2026 elections (Interactive map version)

Following a ruling by the Supreme Court of the United States that narrowed section 2 of the Voting Rights Act, Governor Kay Ivey called state legislators in for a special session to allow for redrawing of Alabama's congressional map. In the session, a bill was passed to allow for the state to redraw the map if a previous ruling that had blocked the state from redrawing mid-decade following a previous lawsuit was lifted. The Supreme Court lifted that restriction on May 11, 2026, clearing the way for the state to redistrict. On May 12, Ivey scheduled special primary elections to be held in the 1st, 2nd, 6th, and 7th congressional districts on August 11, with no possible runoff election. May 19 primary elections were still held in the affected district, but the results were nullified following the special primary.

A panel of federal judges blocked the new map on May 26. Soon after, the state appealed the ruling up to the Supreme Court, which on June 2 overturned the panel's decision, permitting Alabama to use the new map.

== District 1 ==
2026 Alabama's 1st congressional district election
- Reporting: 99% as of Nov 5 at 4:29 PM CST
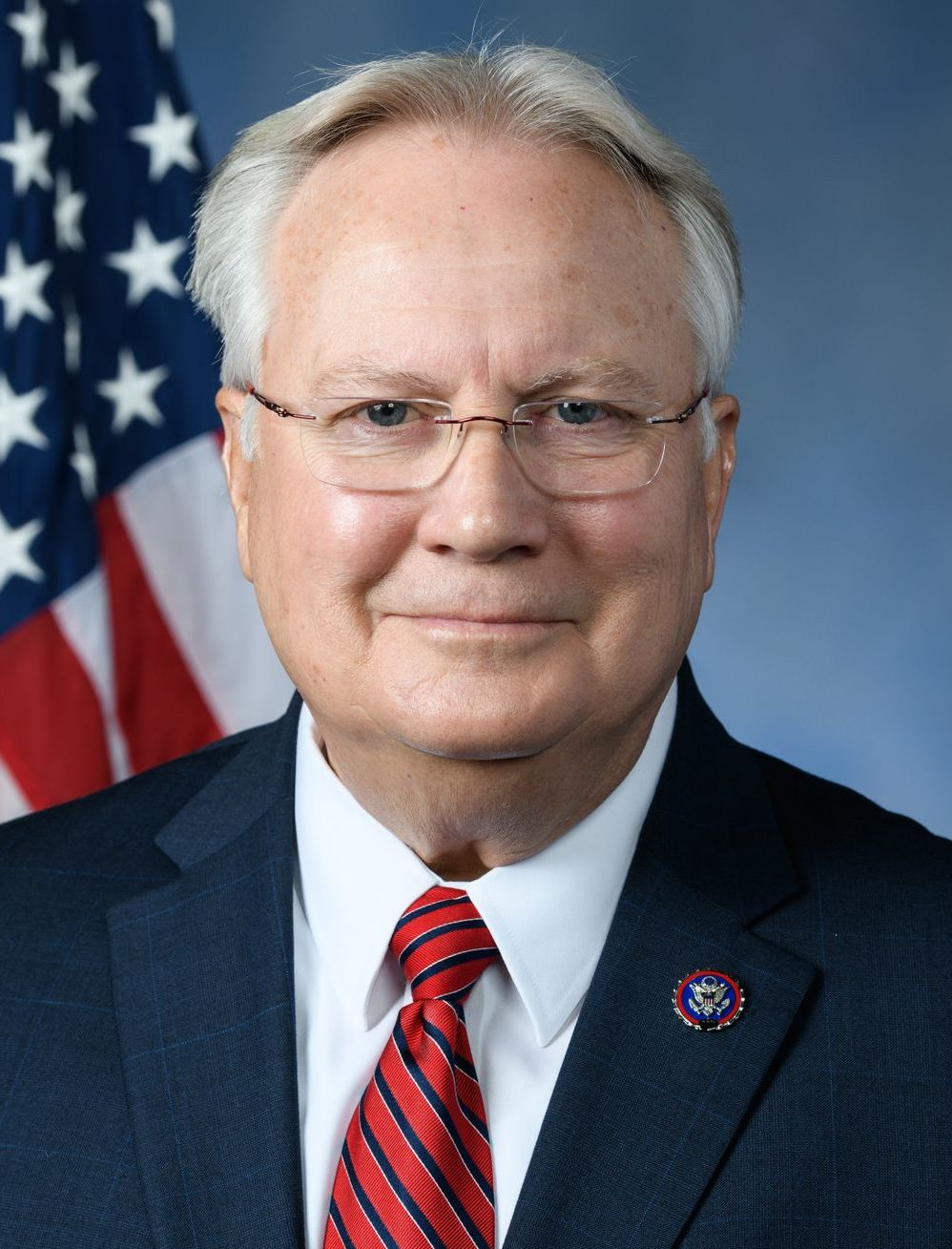

Nominee	Jerry Carl	Clyde Jones
Party	Republican	Democratic
Popular vote	137,025	94,940
Percentage	59.1%	40.9%
U.S. Representative before election
Barry Moore
Republican
Elected U.S. Representative
Jerry Carl
Republican

Alabama's 1st congressional district boundary from the 2026 elections Interactive map version

In the original court-ordered map, this district encompassed the entirety of Baldwin, Coffee, Covington, Dale, and Escambia counties, including the cities of Bay Minette, Daphne, Enterprise, Ozark and majority white sections of Mobile. The incumbent is Republican Barry Moore, who was elected with 78.4% of the vote in 2024.

In the legislature-approved redistricted map, the 1st district was redrawn to only include the southwestern part of the state near the Gulf of Mexico, encompassing all of both Mobile and Baldwin counties, as well as Escambia and Covington counties. Southeastern parts of the state in the Wiregrass Region were redrawn from the 1st district into the 2nd district.

=== Nonbinding Republican primary ===
==== Nominee ====
- Jerry Carl, former U.S. representative (2021–2025)

==== Eliminated in primary ====
- Jimmy Dees, police detective
- Rhett Marques, state representative from the 91st district (2018–present)
- Joshua McKee, retired DARPA contractor
- John Mills, former pilot and perennial candidate
- James Richardson
- Austin Sidwell, small business executive

==== Declined ====
- Barry Moore, incumbent U.S. representative (running for U.S. senate)
- Heather Moore, political strategist and wife of incumbent Barry Moore
- Paul Prine, former Mobile chief of police and candidate for mayor of Mobile in 2025 (ran for Mobile County sheriff)
- Rick Rehm, state representative from the 85th district (2022–present) (running for reelection)

==== Endorsements ====
Jerry Carl

Organizations

- Alabama Farmers Federation
Rhett Marques

U.S. senators

- Katie Britt, Alabama (2023–present)

Statewide officials

- Will Ainsworth, lieutenant governor of Alabama (2019–present)

State legislators

- Donnie Chesteen, state senator from the 29th district (2018–present)
- Nathaniel Ledbetter, speaker of the Alabama House of Representatives (2023–present) from the 24th district (2015–present)
- 30 other current state representatives (Note: Russell Bedsole, state representative from the 49th district (2020–present); Chris Blackshear, state representative from the 80th district (2016–present); Mack Butler, state representative from the 28th district (2022–present); Jim Carns, state representative from the 48th district (1990–2006, 2012–present); Steve Clouse, state representative from the 93rd district (1994–present); Danny Crawford, state representative from the 5th district (2016–present); David Faulkner, state representative from the 46th district (2014–present); Danny Garrett, state representative from the 44th district (2014–present); Jim Hill, state representative from the 50th district (2014–present); Leigh Hulsey, state representative from the 15th district (2022–present); Reed Ingram, state representative from the 75th district (2014–present); Jamie Kiel, state representative from the 18th district (2018–present); Bill Lamb, state representative from the 62nd district (2022–present); Paul Lee, state representative from the 86th district (2010–present); Craig Lipscomb, state representative from the 30th district (2018–present); James Lomax, state representative from the 20th district (2022–present); Ed Oliver, state representative from the 81st district (2018–present); Marcus Paramore, state representative from the 89th district (2022–present); Rick Rehm, state representative from the 85th district (2022–present); Chad Robertson, state representative from the 40th district (2022–present); Chris Sells, state representative from the 90th district (2014–present); Ginny Shaver, state representative from the 39th district (2018–present); Mike Shaw, state representative from the 47th district (2022–present); Van Smith, state representative from the 42nd district (2019–present); Jeff Sorrells, state representative from the 87th district (2018–present); David Standridge, state representative from the 34th district (2012–present); Jerry Starnes, state representative from the 88th district (2022–present); Bubba Underwood, state representative from the 3rd district (2022–present); Ritchie Whorton, state representative from the 22nd district (2014–present); Randy Wood, state representative from the 36th district (2002–present))

Organizations

- Petroleum Marketers Association of Alabama
- Manufacture Alabama
Joshua McKee

U.S. representatives

- Rich McCormick, GA-07 (2023–present)

Organizations

- Alabama Cannabis Coalition

==== Debates and forums ====
2026 Alabama's 1st congressional district election debates and forums
No.	Date	Host	Moderator	Link	Republican	Republican	Republican	Republican	Republican	Republican	Republican
Key: P Participant A Absent N Not invited I Invited W Withdrawn											
Key: P Participant A Absent N Not invited I Invited W Withdrawn					Carl	Dees	Marques	McKee	Mills	Richardson	Sidwell
1	October 9, 2025	Eastern Shore; Republican Women	Jeannie	N/A	P	A	P	A	A	A	A
2	April 29, 2026	Baldwin County; Republican Party	Ken Curtis; Jeff Poor	Rumble	P	P	P	P	P	P	P

==== Fundraising ====
Campaign finance reports as of March 31, 2026
Candidate	Raised	Spent	Cash on hand
Jerry Carl (R)	$722,874	$358,488	$433,677
Rhett Marques (R)	$1,078,197	$252,283	$825,914
Josh McKee (R)	$462,054 (Note: $171,397 of this total was self-funded by McKee.)	$294,869	$167,184
John Mills (R)	$14,162 (Note: $12,500 of this total was self-funded by Mills.)	$15,191	$1,029
James Richardson (R)	$6,921	$6,786	$134
Austin Sidwell (R)	$162,551 (Note: $124,000 of this total was self-funded by Sidwell.)	$126,445	$36,107
Source: Federal Election Commission

==== Polling ====
Poll source	Date(s) administered	Sample size (Note: Key: A – all adults RV – registered voters LV – likely voters V – unclear)	Margin of error	Jerry Carl	Rhett Marques	Joshua McKee	Other	Undecided
PI Polling (Note: Poll commissioned by Alabama Daily News)	April 20–22, 2026	502 (LV)	± 4.4%	20%	22%	6%	5%	47%
PI Polling	March 31 – April 2, 2026	505 (LV)	± 4.4%	23%	19%	–	8%	50%
The Alabama Poll (Note: Poll commissioned by an unspecified client)	March 5–8, 2026	400 (LV)	± 4.9%	28%	19%	9%	–	44%
AM Research Group (R) (Note: Poll sponsored by Carl's campaign)	January 31 – February 2, 2026	– (LV)	± 6.1%	43%	7%	2%	4% (Note: Jimmy Dees with 2%; John Mills and Austin Sidwell with 1%; James Richardson with 0%)	44%
The Alabama Poll	January 23, 2026	400 (LV)	± 4.9%	25%	9%	9%	–	57%
Cygnal (R)	August 21–22, 2025	400 (LV)	± 4.9%	29%	5%	2%	–	64%

Hypothetical polling

Poll source	Date(s) administered	Sample size	Margin of error	Jerry Carl	Rhett Marques	Heather Moore	Undecided
ALPolitics	July 29–31, 2025	612 (LV)	± 4.3%	28%	13%	39%	20%

==== Results ====
Republican primary results
Party	Candidate	Votes	%
Republican	Jerry Carl	32,714	40.3
Republican	Rhett Marques	25,235	31.1
Republican	Joshua McKee	7,336	9.0
Republican	Austin Sidwell	5,829	7.2
Republican	James (Jimmy) Dees	4,194	5.2
Republican	John Mills	3,049	3.8
Republican	James Richardson	2,848	3.5
Total votes		81,205	100.0

=== Nonbinding Democratic primary ===
==== Nominee ====
- Clyde Jones, community organizer

==== Did not qualify ====
- Tom Holmes, nonprofit executive and nominee for this district in 2024
- Kimberly Thomas, sales manager

==== Fundraising ====
Campaign finance reports as of March 31, 2026
Candidate	Raised	Spent	Cash on hand
Clyde Jones (D)	$23,788	$11,495	$12,293
Source: Federal Election Commission

=== Special Republican primary ===
==== Candidates ====
===== Nominee =====
- Jerry Carl, former U.S. representative (2021–2025) and nominee in the May primary election

===== Eliminated in primary =====
- Lucas Burger, real estate agent
- John Mills, former pilot, perennial candidate, and candidate in the May primary election
- Austin Sidwell, small business executive and candidate in the May primary election

===== Withdrawn =====
- Jimmy Dees, police detective and candidate in the May primary election

==== Endorsements ====
Jerry Carl

Executive branch officials

- Donald Trump, president of the United States (2017–2021, 2025–present)

U.S. senators

- Katie Britt, Alabama (2023–present)

U.S. representatives

- Tom Emmer, House majority whip (2023–present) from MN-06 (2015–present)
- Mike Johnson, speaker of the House (2023–present) from LA-04 (2017–present)
- Lisa McClain, MI-09 (2021–present)
- Steve Scalise, House majority leader (2023–present) from LA-01 (2008–present)

==== Results ====
Special Republican primary results
Party	Candidate	Votes	%
Republican	Jerry Carl	23,338	74.7
Republican	Austin Sidwell	5,508	17.6
Republican	John Mills	1,818	5.8
Republican	Lucas Burger	581	1.9
Total votes		31,245	100.0

=== Special Democratic primary ===
==== Candidates ====
===== Nominee =====
- Clyde Jones, community organizer and nominee in the May primary election

===== Declined =====
- Shomari Figures, incumbent U.S. representative from the 2nd district (running for reelection in the 2nd district)

=== General election ===
==== Predictions ====
Source	Ranking	As of
Decision Desk HQ	Safe R	July 14, 2026
The Cook Political Report	Solid R	June 30, 2025
Inside Elections	Solid R	June 30, 2025
Sabato's Crystal Ball	Safe R	July 10, 2025
The Economist (Note: This forecast uses the terms "Likely" and "Very Likely" the same way the other forecasts use the terms "Lean" and "Likely". To avoid confusion, and for the purposes of equivalency, the terms "Likely" and "Very Likely" will be changed to "Lean" and "Likely" for the purposes of this page. As well, "tossup" is labeled "uncertain", but for the purposes of this page it will be labelled "tossup".)	Safe R	May 7, 2026
Silver Bulletin	Solid R	August 20, 2026

==== Post-primary endorsements ====
Jerry Carl (R)

Organizations

- NRA Political Victory Fund
Clyde Jones (D)

Labor unions

- Alabama AFL-CIO

==== Results ====
2026 Alabama's 1st congressional district election
Party	Candidate	Votes	%
Republican	Jerry Carl	137,025	59.07%
Democratic	Clyde Jones	94,940	40.93%
Total votes		231,965	100.00%

== District 2 ==
2026 Alabama's 2nd congressional district election
- Reporting: 99% as of Nov 5 at 4:27 PM CST
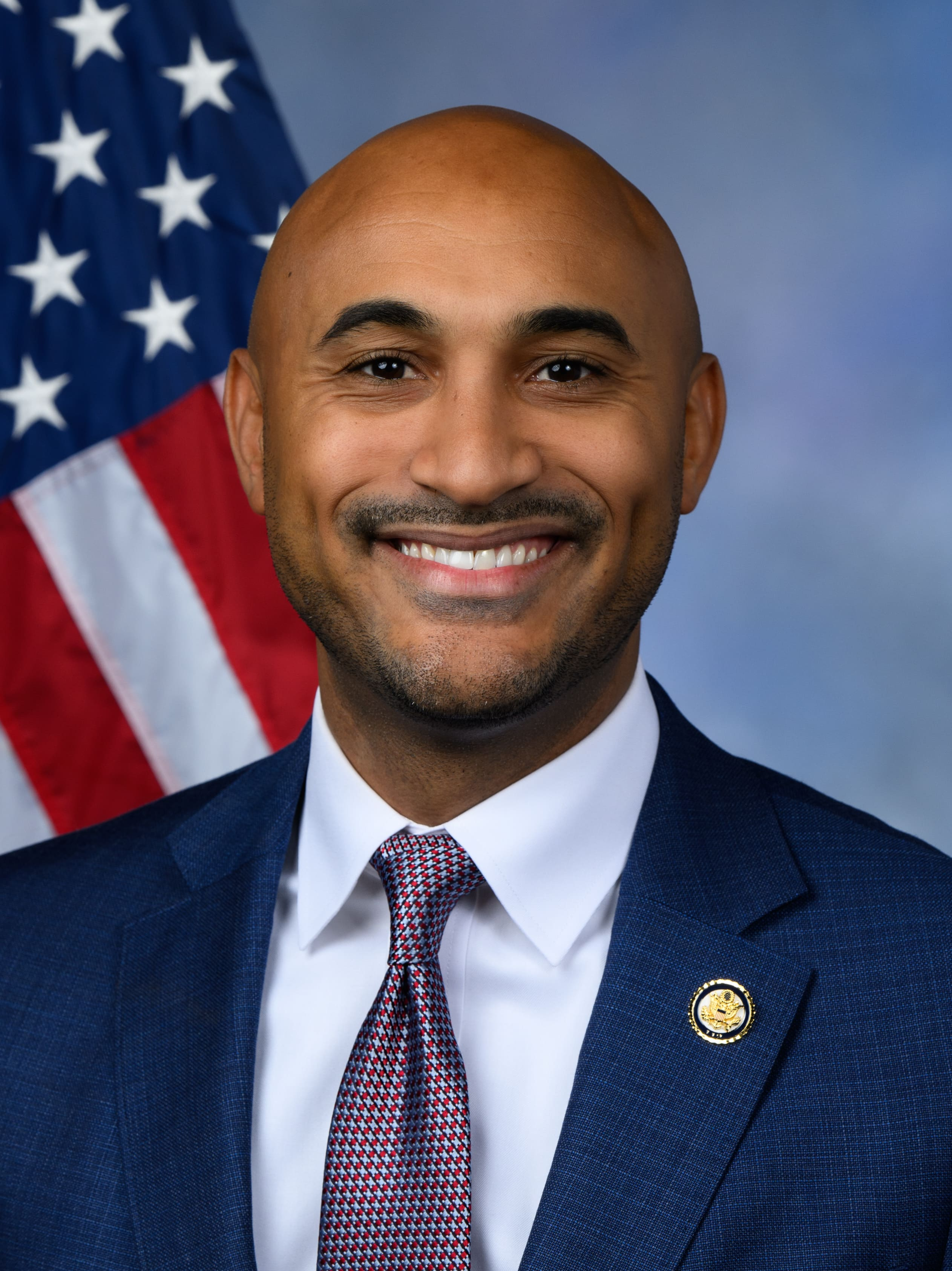

Nominee	Shomari Figures	Rhett Marques
Party	Democratic	Republican
Popular vote	124,422	107,049
Percentage	53.8%	46.2%
U.S. Representative before election
Shomari Figures
Democratic
Elected U.S. Representative
Shomari Figures
Democratic

Alabama's 2nd congressional district boundary from the 2026 elections Interactive map version

In the original court-ordered map, the 2nd district encompassed all of Montgomery County and the capital city of Montgomery, as well as majority Black sections of the Wiregrass Region and the city of Mobile. It also included the entirety of Butler, Macon, Monroe, Pike, and Russell counties. The incumbent is Democrat Shomari Figures, who was elected with 54.6% of the vote in 2024.

In the legislature-approved redistricted map, the 2nd district was redrawn to include southeastern parts of the state in the Wiregrass Region that previously belonged to the 1st district, including Coffee County. It maintains Montgomery County but no longer stretches to majority Black areas of Mobile County.

=== Nonbinding Democratic primary ===
==== Nominee ====
- Shomari Figures, incumbent U.S. representative

==== Endorsements ====
Shomari Figures

Labor unions

- American Federation of Government Employees

Organizations

- Alabama Realtors PAC
- Human Rights Campaign
- League of Conservation Voters Action Fund
- Planned Parenthood Action Fund
- Southern Poverty Law Center Action Fund

==== Fundraising ====
Campaign finance reports as of March 31, 2026
Candidate	Raised	Spent	Cash on hand
Shomari Figures (D)	$792,769	$497,820	$315,558
Source: Federal Election Commission

=== Nonbinding Republican primary ===
==== Nominee ====
- Hampton Harris, attorney, small business owner and candidate for this seat in 2024

==== Fundraising ====
Campaign finance reports as of March 31, 2026
Candidate	Raised	Spent	Cash on hand
Hampton Harris (R)	$209,054 (Note: $205,510 of this total was self-funded by Harris.)	$5,008	$204,046
Source: Federal Election Commission

=== Special Democratic primary ===
==== Candidates ====
===== Nominee =====
- Shomari Figures, incumbent U.S. representative

=== Special Republican primary ===
==== Candidates ====
===== Nominee =====
- Rhett Marques, state representative from the 91st district (2018–present) and candidate for the 1st district in the May primary

===== Eliminated in primary =====
- Hampton Harris, small business owner and nominee in the May primary election
- Christian Horn, candidate for the 7th district in 2024, and candidate for secretary of state in 2022 and 2026
- David Matthews, former United States Department of Agriculture official
- Joshua McKee, retired DARPA contractor and candidate for the 1st district in the May primary election
- James Richardson, candidate for the 1st district in the May primary

==== Endorsements ====
Hampton Harris

State legislators

- Dick Brewbaker, former state senator from the 25th district (2010–2018)
Rhett Marques

Executive branch officials

- Donald Trump, president of the United States (2017–2021, 2025–present)

U.S. senators

- Katie Britt, Alabama (2023–present)

U.S. representatives

- Tom Emmer, House majority whip (2023–present) from MN-06 (2015–present)
- Mike Johnson, speaker of the House (2023–present) from LA-04 (2017–present)
- Lisa McClain, MI-09 (2021–present)
- Steve Scalise, House majority leader (2023–present) from LA-01 (2008–present)

Statewide officials

- Will Ainsworth, lieutenant governor of Alabama (2019–present)

==== Polling ====
Poll source	Date(s) administered	Sample size	Margin of error	Hampton Harris	Christian Horn	David Matthews	Rhett Marques	Joshua McKee	James Richardson	Undecided
Peak Insights (R)	June 8–9, 2026	400 (LV)	± 5.0%	4%	1%	4%	30%	10%	2%	49%

==== Results ====
Special Republican primary results
Party	Candidate	Votes	%
Republican	Rhett Marques	16,425	50.0
Republican	Hampton Harris	7,109	21.7
Republican	David Matthews	5,723	17.4
Republican	Joshua McKee	1,539	4.7
Republican	James Richardson	1,078	3.3
Republican	Christian Horn	961	2.9
Total votes		32,835	100.0

=== General election ===
==== Predictions ====
Source	Ranking	As of
Decision Desk HQ	Lean R (flip)	October 30, 2026
The Cook Political Report	Lean R (flip)	October 23, 2026
Inside Elections	Tilt R (flip)	October 29, 2026
Sabato's Crystal Ball	Lean D	November 2, 2026
The Economist	Likely R (flip)	October 27, 2026
Silver Bulletin	Likely R (flip)	August 20, 2026

==== Post-primary endorsements ====
Shomari Figures (D)

Labor unions

- Alabama AFL-CIO
- National Education Association
- United Mine Workers of America COMPAC

Organizations

- Reproductive Freedom for All
Rhett Marques (R)

Organizations

- NRA Political Victory Fund

==== Fundraising ====
Campaign finance reports as of October 14, 2026
Candidate	Raised	Spent	Cash on hand
Shomari Figures (D)	$2,706,098	$1,531,518	$1,197,689
Rhett Marques (R)	$1,716,374	$1,538,317	$178,057
Source: Federal Election Commission

==== Polling ====
Shomari Figures vs. Rhett Marques

Poll source	Date(s) administered	Sample size	Margin of error	Shomari Figures (D)	Rhett Marques (R)	Undecided
Remington Research Group	October 23–25, 2026	642 (LV)	± 4.0%	46%	48%	6%
Tulchin Research (D) (Note: Poll sponsored by the House Majority PAC, which supports Democratic candidates)	August 24–31, 2026	–	–	47%	47%	6%
DCCC (D) (Note: Poll conducted by Figures's campaign.)	July 29–30, 2026	421 (LV)	± 4.8%	46%	46%	8%
Impact Research (D) (Note: Poll sponsored by the DCCC)	June 22–25, 2026	400 (LV)	–	44%	45%	11%

==== Results ====
2026 Alabama's 2nd congressional district election
Party	Candidate	Votes	%
Democratic	Shomari Figures (incumbent)	124,422	53.75%
Republican	Rhett Marques	107,049	46.25%
Write-in			
Total votes		231,471	100.00%

== District 3 ==
2026 Alabama's 3rd congressional district election
- Reporting: 99% as of Nov 5 at 3:17 PM CST
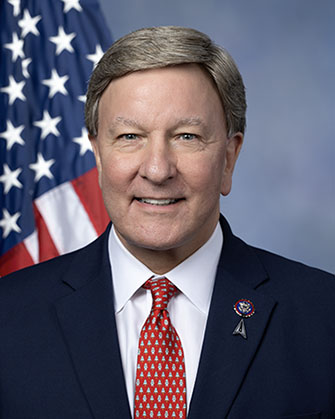

Nominee	Mike Rogers	Lee McInnis
Party	Republican	Democratic
Popular vote	141,800	79,926
Percentage	64.0%	36.0%
U.S. Representative before election
Mike Rogers
Republican
Elected U.S. Representative
Mike Rogers
Republican

Alabama's 3rd congressional district boundary from the 2026 elections Interactive map version

The 3rd district is based in eastern Alabama, taking in Anniston, Auburn, Gadsden, and Talladega. The incumbent is Republican Mike Rogers, who was re-elected unopposed in 2024.

=== Republican primary ===
==== Nominee ====
- Mike Rogers, incumbent U.S. representative

==== Eliminated in primary ====
- Terri LaPoint, author

==== Did not qualify ====
- Draic Coakley, mechanic

==== Endorsements ====
Terri LaPoint

Individuals

- Cathy O'Brien, author and conspiracy theorist
Mike Rogers

Executive branch officials

- Donald Trump, 45th and 47th president of the United States (2017–2021, 2025–present)

Organizations

- AIPAC
- Alabama Realtors PAC
- NRA Political Victory Fund

==== Fundraising ====
Campaign finance reports as of March 31, 2026
Candidate	Raised	Spent	Cash on hand
Terri LaPoint (R)	$13,778	$11,541	$2,237
Mike Rogers (R)	$1,759,770	$1,053,117	$2,628,988
Source: Federal Election Commission

==== Results ====
Republican primary results
Party	Candidate	Votes	%
Republican	Mike Rogers (incumbent)	63,144	83.2
Republican	Terri LaPoint	12,769	16.8
Total votes		75,913	100.0

=== Democratic primary ===
==== Nominee ====
- Lee McInnis, retired Defense Intelligence Agency employee

==== Fundraising ====
Campaign finance reports as of March 31, 2026
Candidate	Raised	Spent	Cash on hand
Lee McInnis (D)	$27,685	$12,862	$9,461
Source: Federal Election Commission

=== General election ===
==== Predictions ====
Source	Ranking	As of
Decision Desk HQ	Safe R	July 14, 2026
The Cook Political Report	Solid R	February 6, 2025
Inside Elections	Solid R	March 7, 2025
Sabato's Crystal Ball	Safe R	July 15, 2025
The Economist	Safe R	May 7, 2026
Silver Bulletin	Solid R	August 20, 2026

==== Post-primary endorsements ====
Lee McInnis (D)

Labor unions

- Alabama AFL-CIO
- United Mine Workers of America COMPAC

==== Results ====
2026 Alabama's 3rd congressional district election
Party	Candidate	Votes	%
Republican	Mike Rogers (incumbent)	141,800	64.0%
Democratic	Lee McInnis	79,926	36.0%
Write-in			
Total votes		221,726	100.00%

== District 4 ==
2026 Alabama's 4th congressional district election
- Reporting: 99% as of Nov 5 at 4:28 PM CST
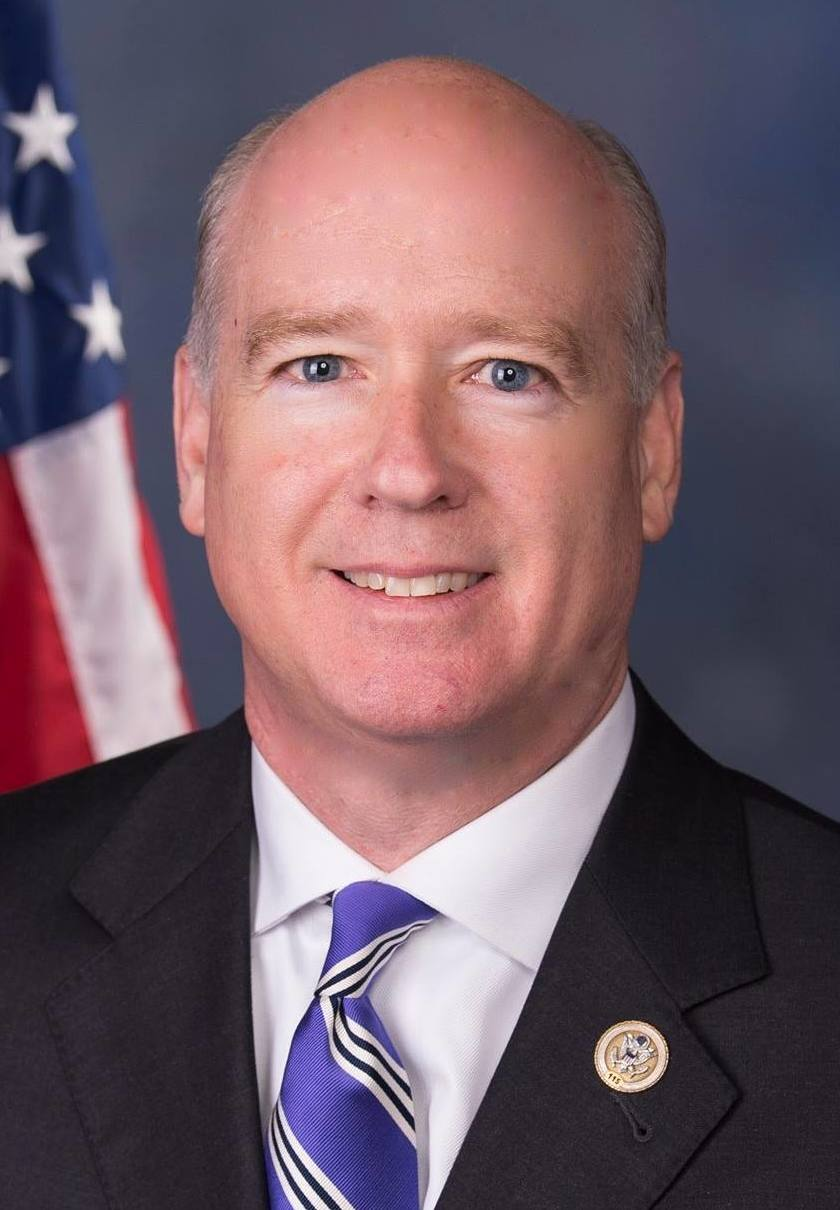

Nominee	Robert Aderholt	Amanda Pusczek
Party	Republican	Democratic
Popular vote	160,008	53,633
Percentage	74.9%	25.1%
U.S. Representative before election
Robert Aderholt
Republican
Elected U.S. Representative
Robert Aderholt
Republican

Alabama's 4th congressional district boundary from the 2026 elections Interactive map version

The 4th district is located in rural north-central Alabama, including Blount, Colbert, Cullman, Fayette, and Marion counties, as well as half of Lauderdale and Tuscaloosa counties. The incumbent is Republican Robert Aderholt, who was re-elected unopposed in 2024.

=== Republican primary ===
==== Nominee ====
- Robert Aderholt, incumbent U.S. representative

==== Eliminated in primary ====
- Tommy Barnes, Colbert County commissioner

==== Endorsements ====
Robert Aderholt

Executive branch officials

- Donald Trump, 45th and 47th president of the United States (2017–2021, 2025–present)

Organizations

- AIPAC
- Alabama Realtors PAC
- NRA Political Victory Fund

==== Fundraising ====
Campaign finance reports as of March 31, 2026
Candidate	Raised	Spent	Cash on hand
Robert Aderholt (R)	$803,634	$931,868	$838,663
Tommy Barnes (R)	$57,033	$22,034	$34,999
Source: Federal Election Commission

==== Results ====
Republican primary results
Party	Candidate	Votes	%
Republican	Robert Aderholt (incumbent)	72,169	77.6
Republican	Tommy Barnes	20,824	22.4
Total votes		92,993	100.0

=== Democratic primary ===
==== Nominee ====
- Amanda Pusczek, registered nurse

==== Eliminated in primary ====
- Shane Weaver, business development manager

==== Endorsements ====
Amanda Pusczek

Organizations

- National Women's Political Caucus

==== Fundraising ====
Campaign finance reports as of March 31, 2026
Candidate	Raised	Spent	Cash on hand
Amanda Pusczek (D)	$13,528	$11,866	$115
Shane Weaver (D)	$7,150 (Note: $1,977 of this total was self-funded by Weaver.)	$5,029	$2,121
Source: Federal Election Commission

==== Results ====
Democratic primary results
Party	Candidate	Votes	%
Democratic	Amanda N. Pusczek	9,648	62.8
Democratic	Shane Weaver	5,719	37.2
Total votes		15,367	100.0

=== General election ===
==== Predictions ====
Source	Ranking	As of
Decision Desk HQ	Safe R	July 14, 2026
The Cook Political Report	Solid R	February 6, 2025
Inside Elections	Solid R	March 7, 2025
Sabato's Crystal Ball	Safe R	July 15, 2025
The Economist	Safe R	May 7, 2026
Silver Bulletin	Solid R	August 20, 2026

==== Post-primary endorsements ====
Amanda Pusczek (D)

Labor unions

- Alabama AFL-CIO
- United Mine Workers of America COMPAC

Organizations

- Council on American–Islamic Relations Action

==== Results ====
2026 Alabama's 4th congressional district election
Party	Candidate	Votes	%
Republican	Robert Aderholt (incumbent)	160,008	74.9%
Democratic	Amanda Pusczek	53,633	25.1%
Write-in			
Total votes		213,641	100.00%

== District 5 ==
2026 Alabama's 5th congressional district election
- Reporting: 99% as of Nov 9 at 11:23 AM CST
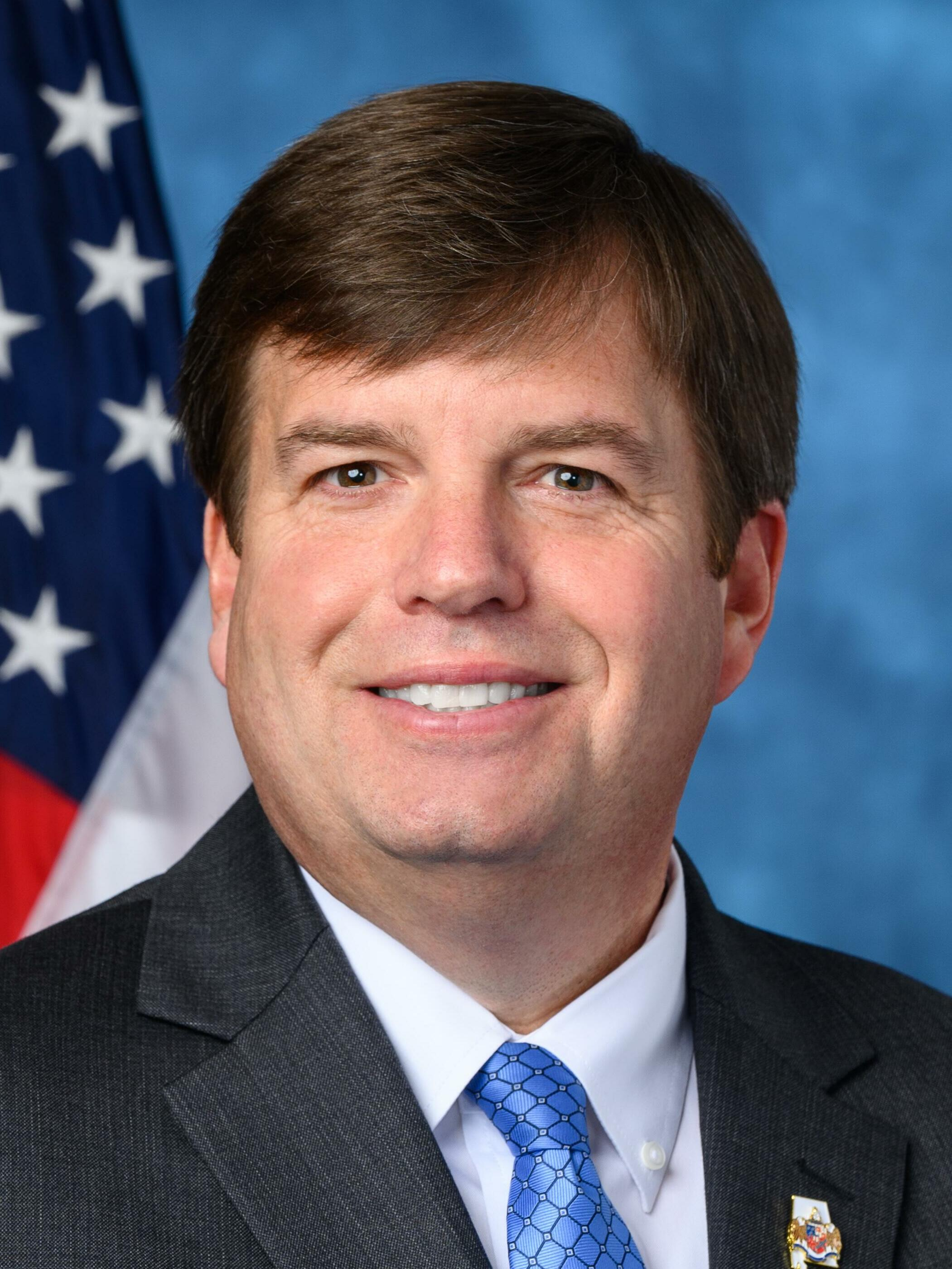

Nominee	Dale Strong	Andrew Sneed
Party	Republican	Democratic
Popular vote	142,080	124,763
Percentage	53.2%	46.8%
U.S. Representative before election
Dale Strong
Republican
Elected U.S. Representative
Dale Strong
Republican

Alabama's 5th congressional district boundary from the 2026 elections Interactive map version

The 5th district is based in northern Alabama, including the city of Huntsville, as well as Athens, Decatur, Madison, and Scottsboro, as well as half of Lauderdale County. The incumbent is Republican Dale Strong, who was re-elected unopposed in 2024.

=== Republican primary ===
==== Nominee ====
- Dale Strong, incumbent U.S. representative

==== Declined ====
- Mo Brooks, former U.S. representative (2011–2023) and candidate for U.S. Senate in 2017 and 2022 (ran for state house)

==== Endorsements ====
Dale Strong

Executive branch officials

- Donald Trump, 45th and 47th president of the United States (2017–2021, 2025–present)

Organizations

- AIPAC
- Alabama Realtors PAC

==== Fundraising ====
Campaign finance reports as of March 31, 2026
Candidate	Raised	Spent	Cash on hand
Dale Strong (R)	$1,233,056	$580,029	$1,282,004
Source: Federal Election Commission

=== Democratic primary ===
==== Nominee ====
- Andrew Sneed, mechanical contractor

==== Eliminated in runoff ====
- Candice Duvieilh, tech product analyst

==== Eliminated in primary ====
- Jeremy Devito, procurement agent

==== Withdrawn ====
- Greg Howard, podcaster

==== Endorsements ====
Candice Duvieilh

Organizations

- National Women's Political Caucus
Andrew Sneed

Labor unions

- American Federation of Government Employees

Organizations

- Alabama Democratic Conference

Individuals

- Uzo Aduba, actress

==== Fundraising ====
Campaign finance reports as of March 31, 2026
Candidate	Raised	Spent	Cash on hand
Jeremy Devito (D)	$32,285	$22,415	$4,139
Candice Duvieilh (D)	$28,047	$21,086	$6,961
Andrew Sneed (D)	$453,186	$218,948	$234,238
Source: Federal Election Commission

==== Results ====
Democratic primary results
Party	Candidate	Votes	%
Democratic	Andrew Sneed	19,301	42.0
Democratic	Candace Dollar Duvieilh	16,388	35.7
Democratic	Jeremy Devito	10,265	22.3
Total votes		45,954	100.0

==== Runoff results ====
Democratic primary runoff results
Party	Candidate	Votes	%
Democratic	Andrew Sneed	16,688	78.4
Democratic	Candace Dollar Duvieilh	4,607	21.6
Total votes		21,295	100.0

=== General election ===
==== Predictions ====
Source	Ranking	As of
Decision Desk HQ	Safe R	July 14, 2026
The Cook Political Report	Solid R	February 6, 2025
Inside Elections	Solid R	March 7, 2025
Sabato's Crystal Ball	Safe R	July 15, 2025
The Economist	Safe R	May 7, 2026
Silver Bulletin	Solid R	August 20, 2026

==== Post-primary endorsements ====
Dale Strong (R)

Organizations

- NRA Political Victory Fund
- U.S. Chamber of Commerce
Andrew Sneed (D)

Labor unions

- Alabama AFL-CIO
- United Mine Workers of America COMPAC

==== Results ====
2026 Alabama's 5th congressional district election
Party	Candidate	Votes	%
Republican	Dale Strong (incumbent)	152,080	53.2
Democratic	Andrew Sneed	124,763	46.8
Write-in			
Total votes		266,843	100.00

== District 6 ==
2026 Alabama's 6th congressional district election
- Reporting: 98% as of Nov 5 at 4:26 PM CST
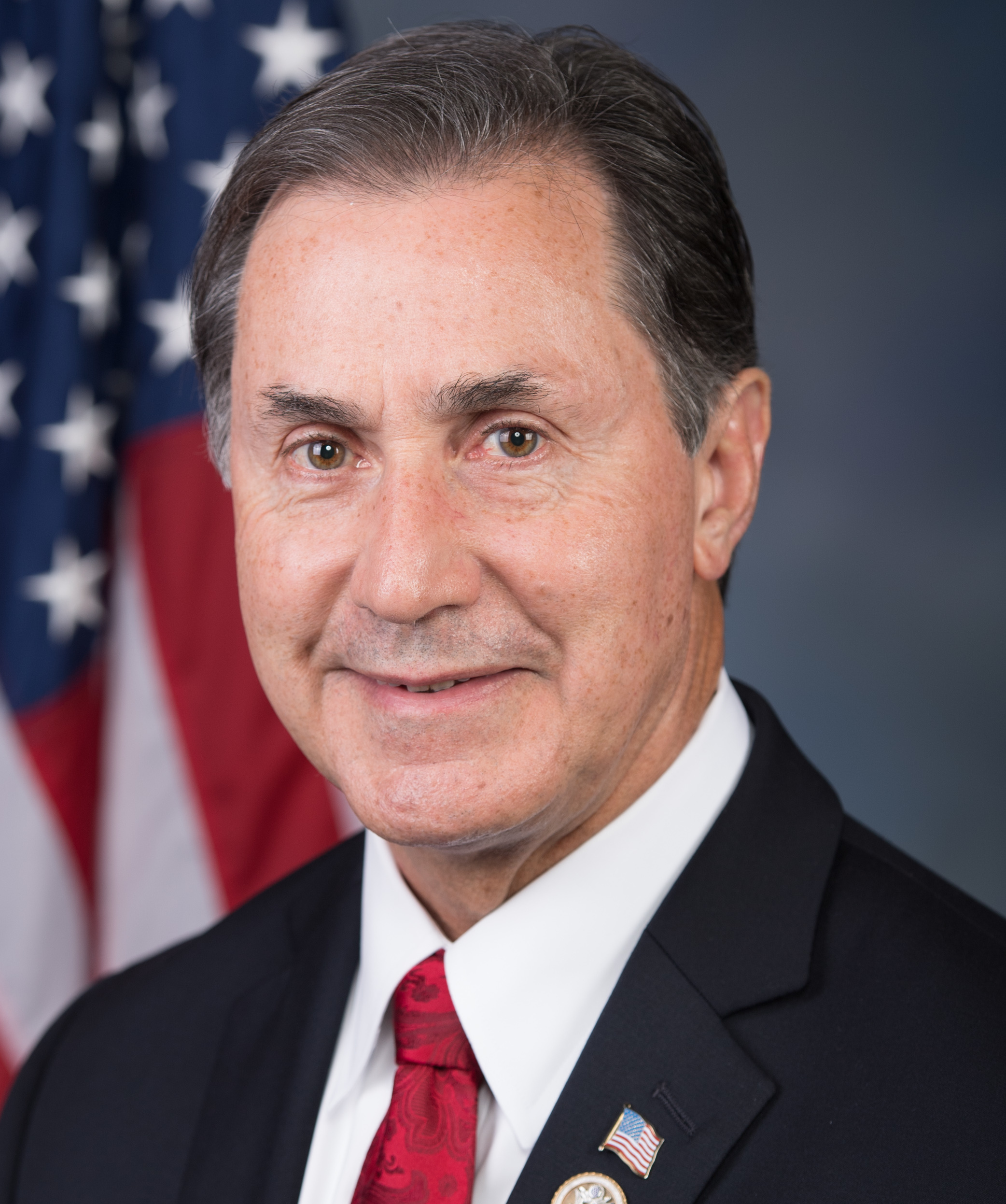

Nominee	Gary Palmer	Maurice Mercer
Party	Republican	Democratic
Popular vote	149,921	110,957
Percentage	57.5%	42.5%
U.S. Representative before election
Gary Palmer
Republican
Elected U.S. Representative
Gary Palmer
Republican

Alabama's 6th congressional district boundary from the 2026 elections Interactive map version

The 6th district encompasses the central part of the state near Greater Birmingham, taking in the northeastern parts of the city of Birmingham and Jefferson County, as well as the surrounding suburbs. The incumbent is Republican Gary Palmer, who was re-elected with 70.3% of the vote in 2024.

In the legislature-approved redistricted map, the only change to the 6th district was that half of Elmore County was ceded to the 2nd district.

=== Nonbinding Republican primary ===
==== Nominee ====
- Gary Palmer, incumbent U.S. representative

==== Eliminated in primary ====
- Case Dixon, physical therapist assistant

==== Endorsements ====
Case Dixon

Organizations

- Alabama Republican Assembly
- Republican Liberty Caucus
Gary Palmer

Executive branch officials

- Donald Trump, 45th and 47th president of the United States (2017–2021, 2025–present)

Organizations

- AIPAC
- Alabama Realtors PAC
- NRA Political Victory Fund

==== Fundraising ====
Campaign finance reports as of March 31, 2026
Candidate	Raised	Spent	Cash on hand
Case Dixon (R)	$18,878 (Note: $8,600 of this total was self-funded by Dixon.)	$15,040	$3,838
Gary Palmer (R)	$708,577	$494,035	$367,781
Source: Federal Election Commission

==== Results ====
Republican primary results
Party	Candidate	Votes	%
Republican	Gary Palmer (incumbent)	59,078	80.8
Republican	Case Dixon	14,054	19.2
Total votes		73,132	100.0

=== Nonbinding Democratic primary ===
==== Nominee ====
- Keith Pilkington, nurse

==== Withdrawn ====
- Elizabeth Anderson, businesswoman and nominee for this district in 2024

=== Special Republican primary ===
==== Nominee ====
- Gary Palmer, incumbent U.S. representative

==== Eliminated in primary ====
- Case Dixon, physical therapist assistant and candidate in the May primary election

==== Results ====
Special Republican primary results
Party	Candidate	Votes	%
Republican	Gary Palmer (incumbent)	24,497	87.0
Republican	Case Dixon	3,672	13.0
Total votes		28,169	100.0

=== Special Democratic primary ===
==== Nominee ====
- Maurice Mercer, former Pelham City Council president

==== Eliminated in primary ====
- Jacob Bouma-Sims, community organizer
- Ashtyn Kennedy, substitute teacher
- Keith Pilkington, nurse and nominee in the May primary election
Ashtyn Kennedy

Organizations

- National Women's Political Caucus

==== Results ====
Special Democratic primary results
Party	Candidate	Votes	%
Democratic	Maurice Mercer	5,405	64.2
Democratic	Ashtyn Kenendy	1,796	21.3
Democratic	Keith Pilkington	612	7.3
Democratic	Jacob Bouma-Sims	607	7.2
Total votes		8,420	100.0

=== General election ===
==== Predictions ====
Source	Ranking	As of
Decision Desk HQ	Safe R	July 14, 2026
The Cook Political Report	Solid R	February 6, 2025
Inside Elections	Solid R	March 7, 2025
Sabato's Crystal Ball	Safe R	July 15, 2025
The Economist	Safe R	April 24, 2026
Silver Bulletin	Solid R	August 20, 2026

==== Post-primary endorsements ====
Maurice Mercer (D)

Labor unions

- Alabama AFL-CIO

==== Results ====
2026 Alabama's 6th congressional district election
Party	Candidate	Votes	%
Republican	Gary Palmer (incumbent)	149,921	57.5%
Democratic	Maurice Mercer	110,957	42.5%
Write-in			
Total votes		260,878	100.00%

== District 7 ==
2026 Alabama's 7th congressional district election
- Reporting: 99% as of Nov 5 at 4:26 PM CST
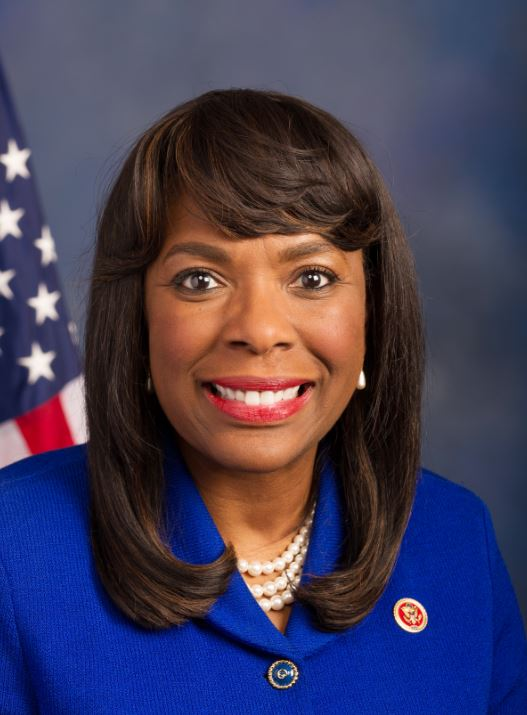

Nominee	Terri Sewell	Ammie Akin
Party	Democratic	Republican
Popular vote	174,823	77,085
Percentage	69.4%	30.6%
U.S. Representative before election
Terri Sewell
Democratic
Elected U.S. Representative
Terri Sewell
Democratic

Alabama's 7th congressional district boundary from the 2026 elections Interactive map version

The 7th district encompasses the west-central part of the state in the Black Belt, including the cities of Demopolis, Greensboro, and Selma, as well as taking in majority-black areas of Birmingham and Tuscaloosa. The incumbent is Democrat Terri Sewell, who was re-elected with 63.7% of the vote in 2024.

In the legislature-approved redistricted map, the 7th district gained Monroe and Conecuh counties from the 1st district, while ceding Lowndes County to the 2nd district.

=== Nonbinding Democratic primary ===
==== Nominee ====
- Terri Sewell, incumbent U.S. representative

==== Endorsements ====
Terri Sewell

Labor unions

- American Federation of Government Employees

Organizations

- Alabama Realtors PAC
- Southern Poverty Law Center Action Fund

==== Fundraising ====
Campaign finance reports as of March 31, 2026
Candidate	Raised	Spent	Cash on hand
Terri Sewell (D)	$1,514,475	$1,339,437	$3,650,598
Source: Federal Election Commission

=== Special Democratic primary ===
==== Candidates ====
===== Nominee =====
- Terri Sewell, incumbent U.S. representative

==== Endorsements ====
Terri Sewell

Organizations

- U.S. Chamber of Commerce

=== Special Republican primary ===
==== Candidates ====
===== Nominee =====
- Ammie Akin, educator

===== Eliminated in primary =====
- David Perry, nominee for the state board of education's 5th district in 2024

==== Results ====
Special Republican primary results
Party	Candidate	Votes	%
Republican	Ammie Akin	9,316	73.4
Republican	David Perry	3,381	26.6
Total votes		12,697	100.0

=== General election ===
==== Predictions ====
Source	Ranking	As of
Decision Desk HQ	Safe D	July 14, 2026
The Cook Political Report	Solid D	February 6, 2025
Inside Elections	Solid D	March 7, 2025
Sabato's Crystal Ball	Safe D	July 15, 2025
The Economist	Safe D	April 24, 2026
Silver Bulletin	Solid D	August 20, 2026

==== Post-primary endorsements ====
Terri Sewell (D)

Labor unions

- Alabama AFL-CIO
- National Education Association
- United Mine Workers of America COMPAC

==== Results ====
2026 Alabama's 7th congressional district election
Party	Candidate	Votes	%
Democratic	Terri Sewell (incumbent)	174,823	69.4%
Republican	Ammie Akin	77,085	30.6%
Write-in			
Total votes		251,908	100.00%

== Notes ==
Partisan clients
