= Morgan Murphy =

Morgan Murphy is the name of:

- Morgan Murphy (food critic) (born 1972), food critic and author
- Morgan Murphy (baseball) (1867–1938), former catcher in Major League Baseball
- Morgan Murphy (comedian) (born 1981), standup comedian and comedy writer
- Morgan F. Murphy (1932–2016), former U.S. representative from Illinois (1971–1981)
- Morgan Murphy Media, radio and television broadcasting chain based in Madison, Wisconsin
