= 2026 Alabama gubernatorial election =

- November 3, 2026
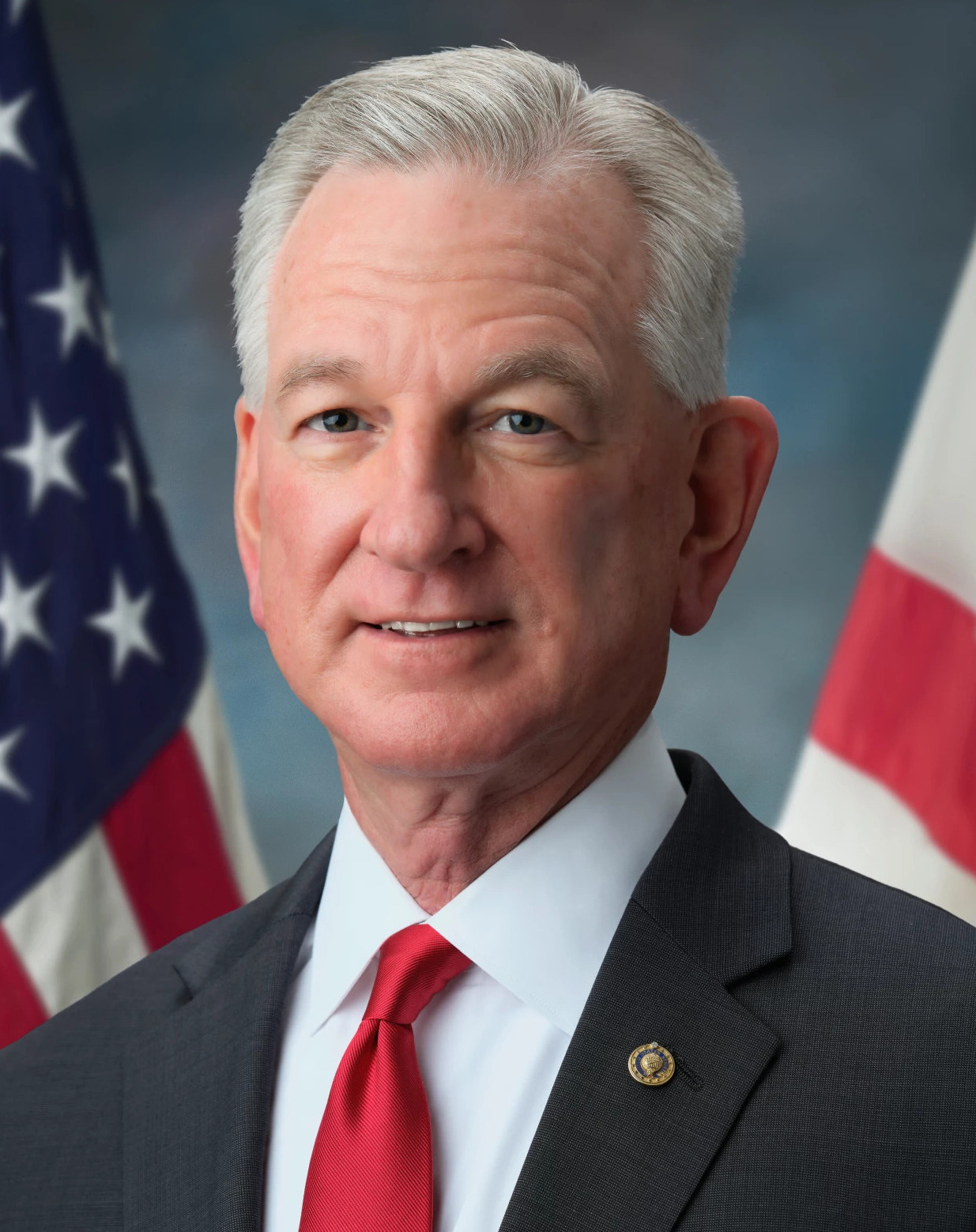

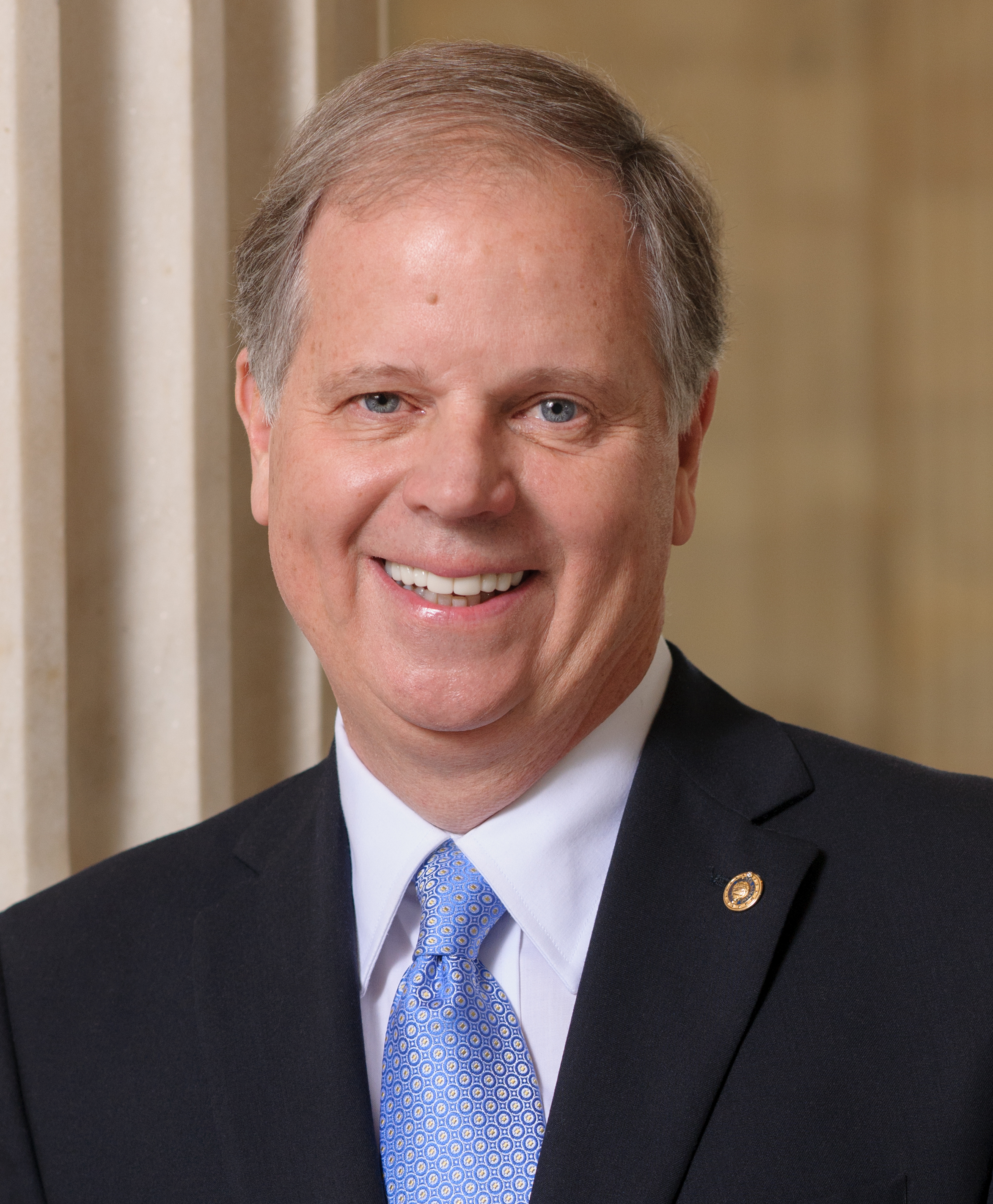
Nominee	Tommy Tuberville	Doug Jones
Party	Republican	Democratic
Popular vote	873,332	806,270
Percentage	52.00%	48.00%
- Tuberville: 50–60% 60–70% 70–80% 80–90% Jones: 50–60% 60–70% 70–80% 80–90%
Governor before election
Kay Ivey
Republican
Elected Governor
Tommy Tuberville
Republican

The 2026 Alabama gubernatorial election was held on November 3, 2026, to elect the governor of Alabama. Republican senator Tommy Tuberville and Democratic former senator Doug Jones were the nominees for their respective parties. Republican incumbent Kay Ivey was term-limited and ineligible to seek a third full consecutive term.

Primary elections were held on May 19, 2026. This was a rematch of the 2020 Senate election, where Tuberville defeated incumbent senator Jones. Democrats have not won a gubernatorial election in Alabama since 1998.

On November 4, 2026, Tuberville was declared the winner by the Associated Press. He won 52% to Jones's 48%, making it the closest gubernatorial election in Alabama since 2002. This was the 7th consecutive election in which a Republican was elected to the governorship of Alabama.

== Republican primary ==
=== Candidates ===
==== Nominee ====
- Tommy Tuberville, U.S. senator (2021–present)

==== Eliminated in primary ====
- Ken McFeeters, insurance agent and candidate for Alabama's 6th congressional district in 2024
- Will Santivasci, event center operations manager

==== Declined ====
- Will Ainsworth, lieutenant governor of Alabama (2019–present) (endorsed Tuberville)
- Lynda Blanchard, U.S. Ambassador to the Food and Agriculture Organization (2025-present), former U.S. ambassador to Slovenia (2019–2021), and candidate for governor in 2022
- Mo Brooks, former U.S. representative from Alabama's 5th congressional district (2011–2023) (ran for state representative)
- Steve Marshall, attorney general of Alabama (2017–present) (ran for U.S Senate)
- Rick Pate, commissioner of the Alabama department of agriculture and industries (2019–present) (ran for lieutenant governor)

=== Endorsements ===
Ken McFeeters

Organizations

- Alabama Cannabis Coalition
Tommy Tuberville

Executive branch officials

- Donald Trump, president of the United States (2017–2021, 2025–present)

U.S. senators

- Katie Britt, Alabama (2023–present)
- Rick Scott, Florida (2019–present)

State officials

- Will Ainsworth, lieutenant governor of Alabama (2019–present)
- Jere Beasley, lieutenant governor of Alabama (1971–1979) and acting governor of Alabama (1972) (Democratic)
- Mike Braun, governor of Indiana (2025–present)

State legislators

- Garlan Gudger, president pro tempore of the Alabama Senate (2025–present) from SD-04 district (2018–present)
- Nathaniel Ledbetter, speaker of the Alabama House of Representatives (2023–present) from HD-24 (2014–present) (previously endorsed Ainsworth)
- Scott Stadthagen, majority leader of the Alabama House of Representatives (2023–present) HD-09 (2019–present)

Individuals

- Taylor Hicks, singer
- A. J. McCarron, former professional football player and candidate for lieutenant governor in 2026

Organizations

- Republicans for National Renewal
- Alabama Farmers Federation
- Alabama Forestry Association
- Alabama Realtors PAC
- Associated Builders and Contractors Alabama
- Associated Builders and Contractors North Alabama
- Business Council of Alabama
- Club for Growth
- Electric Cooperatives of Alabama
- Manufacture Alabama
- National Rifle Association Political Victory Fund
Will Ainsworth (declined)

State legislators

- Nathaniel Ledbetter, speaker of the Alabama House of Representatives (2023–present) from HD-24 (2014–present) (later endorsed Tuberville)

=== Fundraising ===
Campaign finance reports as of May 18, 2026
Candidate	Raised	Other receipts	Spent	Cash on hand
Ken McFeeters (R)	$353	$20,000	$13,275	$7,077
Tommy Tuberville (R)	$12,885,564	$89,295	$3,666,061	$9,308,797
Source: Alabama FCPA

=== Polling ===
Poll source	Date(s) administered	Sample size (Note: Key: A – all adults RV – registered voters LV – likely voters V – unclear)	Margin of error	Ken McFeeters	Will Santivasci	Tommy Tuberville	Other	Undecided
Cygnal (R)	April 29–30, 2026	500 (LV)	± 4.38%	7%	3%	65%	–	25%
Quantus Insights (R)	October 13–14, 2025	1,050 (RV)	± 3.2%	4%	–	63%	11%	22%

Hypothetical polling

Will Ainsworth vs. Rick Pate

Poll source	Date(s) administered	Sample size	Margin of error	Will Ainsworth	Rick Pate	Undecided
Remington Research Group (R)	December 2024	– (RV)	–	34%	5%	61%

=== Results ===
Primary results by county: Tuberville: 70–80%; 80–90%; >90%

Republican primary
Party	Candidate	Votes	%
Republican	Tommy Tuberville	421,754	85.4
Republican	Ken McFeeters	47,166	9.6
Republican	"Alabama" Will Santivasci	24,456	5.0
Total votes		493,376	100.00

== Democratic primary ==
=== Candidates ===
==== Nominee ====
- Doug Jones, former U.S. senator (2018–2021)

==== Eliminated in primary ====
- Will Boyd, former Greenville, Illinois city councilor and perennial candidate
- Ja'Mel Brown, online pastor
- Yolanda Flowers, educator and nominee for governor in 2022
- Chad Chig Martin, hemp business owner and candidate for governor in 2022
- Nathan Mathis, former state representative from the 87th district (1983–1995) and perennial candidate

=== Endorsements ===
Will Boyd

Party officials

- Jaime Harrison, former chair of the Democratic National Committee (2021–2025)

Organizations

- Alabama Cannabis Coalition
Doug Jones

U.S. representatives

- Terri Sewell, AL-07 (2011–present)

Statewide officials

- Wes Moore, governor of Maryland (2023–present)
- Ron Sparks, former commissioner of agriculture and industries (2003–2011) and nominee for the position in 2026

State legislators

- Bobby Singleton, minority leader of the Alabama Senate (2019–present) from SD-24 (2005–present)
- Anthony Daniels, minority leader of the Alabama House of Representatives (2017–present) from HD-53 (2014–present)
- Phillip Ensler, HD-74 (2022–present) and nominee for lieutenant governor in 2026

Individuals

- Jason Isbell, singer-songwriter

=== Fundraising ===
Campaign finance reports as of May 18, 2026
Candidate	Raised	Other receipts	Spent	Cash on hand
Will Boyd (D)	$72,795	$220	$64,092	$9,247
Ja'Mel Brown (D)	$2,310	$1,600	$0	$3,910
Yolanda Flowers (D)	$2,015	$4,966	$6,106	$874
Doug Jones (D)	$2,251,815	$0	$1,122,798	$1,129,516
Chad Chig Martin (D)	$28,663	$0	$28,936	$2,228
Nate Mathis (D)	$11,000	$0	$11,000	$0
Source: Alabama FCPA

=== Campaign ===
Will Boyd was the first candidate to enter the race, in June 2025. Doug Jones did not rule out a bid in the same month, while campaigning for a Democrat in a state legislative special election. He officially launched his campaign in November 2025. Following reports that Jones would announce a campaign, Boyd's campaign responded by stating that he would not be dropping out of the race.

Jones expressed support for a state lottery in Alabama. He also pledged to remove members of the Alabama Public Library Service and replace them with nonpartisan members.

=== Results ===
Primary results by county: Jones: 40–50%; 50–60%; 60–70%; 70–80%; 80–90%

Democratic primary
Party	Candidate	Votes	%
Democratic	Doug Jones	286,612	78.6
Democratic	Will Boyd	35,267	9.7
Democratic	Yolanda Rochelle Flowers	18,230	5.0
Democratic	Jamel J. Brown	15,808	4.3
Democratic	Chad "Chig" Martin	5,765	1.6
Democratic	Nathan "Nate" Mathis	2,953	0.8
Total votes		364,635	100.0

== Independent and third-party candidates ==
=== Candidates ===
==== Declared ====
- Ronald Burnette Jr., businessman (independent, write-in)
- Darren Knight, comedian (independent, write-in)

== General election ==
=== Predictions ===
Source	Ranking	As of
The Cook Political Report	Solid R	October 29, 2026
Decision Desk HQ	Likely R	November 3, 2026
Fox News	Solid R	November 1, 2026
Inside Elections	Solid R	October 29, 2026
NBC News	Solid R	November 3, 2026
RealClearPolitics	Solid R	November 1, 2026
Sabato's Crystal Ball	Likely R	November 2, 2026
Silver Bulletin	Solid R	November 3, 2026

=== Post-primary endorsements ===
Doug Jones (D)

Statewide officials

- Andy Beshear, governor of Kentucky (2019–present)

State legislators

- Stacey Abrams, former member of the Georgia House of Representatives (2007–2017) and nominee for governor of Georgia in 2018 and 2022

Organizations

- Center for New Liberalism
- Council on American–Islamic Relations Action
- Omega Network for Action

Labor unions

- Alabama AFL-CIO
- United Mine Workers of America COMPAC Council
Tommy Tuberville (R)

Statewide officials

- Kay Ivey, governor of Alabama (2017–present)

Organizations

- National Federation of Independent Business

=== Polling ===
Poll source	Date(s) administered	Sample size	Margin of error	Tommy Tuberville (R)	Doug Jones (D)	Undecided
Chism Strategies (D)	October 22–24, 2026	695 (LV)	± 3.7%	48%	45%	7%
Cygnal (R) (Note: Poll conducted for Alabama Daily News and Gray Media Alabama)	October 16–17, 2026	500 (LV)	± 4.4%	51%	40%	9%
The Alabama Poll	October 15–16, 2026	600 (LV)	—	51%	39%	10%
RMG Research (R) (Note: Poll conducted for Alabama Policy Action)	September 21–25, 2026	800 (RV)	± 3.5%	50%	37%	13%
yes. every kid.	July 8–11, 2026	601 (LV)	± 4.0%	49%	41%	11%
Cygnal (R)	November 12–13, 2025	605 (LV)	± 4.0%	53%	34%	13%

=== Fundraising ===
Campaign finance reports as of November 2, 2026
Candidate	Raised	Other receipts	Spent	Cash on hand
Tommy Tuberville (R)	$17,572,754	$164,841	$15,133,555	$2,604,040
Doug Jones (D)	$7,042,982	$0	$6,633,078	$410,676
Source: Alabama FCPA

=== Results ===
2026 Alabama gubernatorial election
Party	Candidate	Votes	%
Republican	Tommy Tuberville	873,332	52.00
Democratic	Doug Jones	806,270	48.00
Write-in			
Total votes		1,679,602	100.0
Republican hold			

Counties that flipped from Republican to Democratic

- Barbour (largest municipality: Goose Creek)
- Clarke (largest municipality: Jackson)
- Conecuh (largest municipality: Evergreen)
- Madison (largest municipality: Huntsville)
- Marengo (largest municipality: Demopolis)
- Mobile (largest municipality: Mobile)
- Russell (largest municipality: Phenix City)
- Tuscaloosa (largest municipality: Tuscaloosa)

==== By congressional district ====
Tuberville won five congressional districts, while Jones won two congressional districts.

District	Jones	Tuberville	Representative
1st	43%	56%	Jerry Carl
2nd	54%	46%	Shomari Figures
3rd	39%	61%	Mike Rogers
4th	29%	71%	Robert Aderholt
5th	49%	50%	Dale Strong
6th	47%	53%	Gary Palmer
7th	70%	30%	Terri Sewell

== Challenges to Tuberville's eligibility ==
Alabama's governors, unlike its U.S. senators, must satisfy three conditions set out in Article V, Section 117 of the Constitution of Alabama:

The governor and lieutenant governor shall each be at least thirty years of age when elected, and shall have been citizens of the United States ten years and resident citizens of this state at least seven years next before the date of their election.

Throughout Tuberville's gubernatorial campaign, many alleged that he did not satisfy the seven-year residency condition, which would have rendered him ineligible to hold the office.

=== Background ===
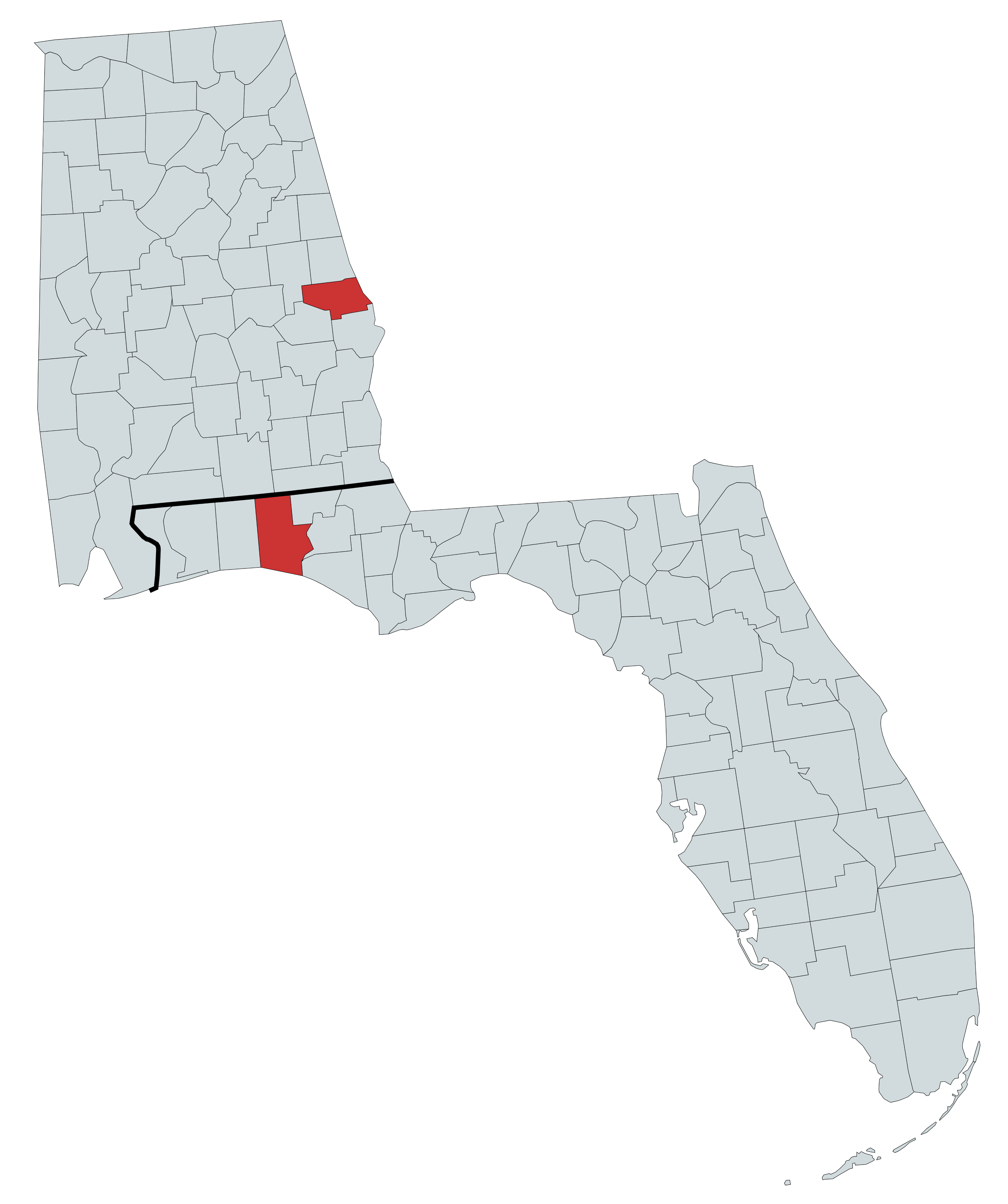
Tuberville owns residences in Lee County, Alabama, and Walton County, Florida.

Tuberville is originally from Arkansas. In addition to his 9-year tenure at Auburn University in Alabama, Tuberville's football coaching career variously placed him in Florida, Mississippi, Texas, and Ohio. In July 2017, having retired from coaching and joined ESPN as an analyst, Tuberville recorded a promotional video at his residence in Santa Rosa Beach, Florida, in which he says, "Six months ago, after 40 years of coaching football, I hung up my whistle and moved to Santa Rosa Beach, Florida, with the white sands and the blue water. What a great place to live." Tuberville purchased the 4,000-square-foot Florida residence through an LLC in 2004, and its value was estimated at $5.6 million in 2026.

In March 2017, Tuberville filed preliminary paperwork to run for governor of Alabama in the 2018 election, but he withdrew less than a month later, citing the seven-year residency requirement as a concern.

Tuberville was issued an Alabama driver's license in March 2019, shortly before declaring his candidacy in the state's 2020 U.S. Senate race. During the campaign, Tuberville claimed that he had moved to Alabama in August 2018, despite having voted in Florida in the November 2018 midterm elections. Tuberville cited a 1,551-square-foot home on Cherry Street in Auburn, Alabama, as his primary residence. The home was purchased under the names of Tuberville's wife and son in March 2017, and they claimed a homestead exemption in October 2018. Tuberville did not appear on the deed for the property himself until 2024.

During the 2020 Republican primary for U.S. Senate, Republican opponent Bradley Byrne said of Tuberville, "We don't like carpetbaggers in Alabama," to which Tuberville commented at an August 2019 campaign event, "I'm not an everyday resident of Alabama. [...] I've been here most of the last 20 years. I've had property. So, you'll see that on TV – 'He's a carpetbagger.' Yeah, I'm a carpetbagger of this country. I love this country. I love this state. I'm a carpetbagger." Republican primary opponent Jeff Sessions commissioned advertisements labeling Tuberville a "Florida Man" and referred to him as a "tourist from Florida."

In March 2025, amid speculation that Tuberville would mount a gubernatorial bid, Alabama state senator Sam Givhan, a Republican, expressed concerns about Tuberville's ability to meet the residency requirement, saying during a radio appearance, "Owning a house in Alabama is not enough. You've got to live here seven years. [...] So that's going to be a hurdle."

During Tuberville's tenure as Senator, expense records have shown significant spending on air travel, transportation, and dining in the area near his Florida property. In May 2026, speaking to reporters after his induction into the Alabama Sports Hall of Fame, Tuberville said, "I go back to Auburn three or four ball games a year. Actually, I live in Auburn, but living mostly in D.C., you know, during the week."

=== Challenges from Ken McFeeters ===
On January 27, 2026, after the filing deadline for the Republican Party primary had passed, Tuberville's gubernatorial primary opponent, Ken McFeeters, submitted a challenge to the Alabama Republican Party, formally alleging that Tuberville did not satisfy the state's residency requirement. McFeeters alleged in his petition that Tuberville primarily resides at his beachfront house in Santa Rosa Beach, Florida. A spokesperson for Tuberville described the challenge as "a ridiculous PR stunt from a desperate candidate," and Tuberville dismissed the allegation, stating, "What a joke. I guess they think, you know, I hadn't done my homework."

The Alabama Republican Party's 21-member steering committee reviewed the challenge on February 2, 2026, and rejected it, clearing the path for Tuberville to be on the primary ballot. In a press release following the committee's decision, Tuberville's campaign chairman Jordan Doufexis celebrated that "common sense has prevailed and this made-up 'residency' hoax will be put to bed for good."

In March 2026, McFeeters announced on the steps of the Alabama Capitol that he had filed a lawsuit against Tuberville in the Covington County Circuit Court. McFeeters, though not a lawyer, litigated the case pro se and listed “God’s Law Team” as his law firm in the complaint. McFeeters pledged that he would drop out of the race if Tuberville released records demonstrating proof of residency. Tuberville did not release any records, and the lawsuit was dismissed for improper venue on May 18, 2026, the day before the primary election.

On May 27, 2026, the week after the primary election, McFeeters filed another challenge with the Alabama Republican Party, arguing that the party should void Tuberville's nomination on eligibility grounds. The party's Candidate Committee voted to proceed with the contest, surprising McFeeters, who said he was "totally shocked." During the proceedings, Tuberville produced seven years of heavily redacted Alabama tax returns, from 2018 to 2024. However, by failing to adequately redact scannable PDF417 barcodes in the corners of the document, the unredacted contents of the tax returns were inadvertently made available to the involved parties. McFeeters, unconvinced that the tax returns sufficiently demonstrated proof of residency, shared plans to continue his challenge, telling AL.com, "I want his wife to tell me, with a straight face, that she lives in a one-bathroom house with her husband and adults and guests. A woman like that is not going to share a bathroom."

Following an internal closed-door hearing on June 14, 2026, the Alabama Republican Party Candidate Committee unanimously dismissed the challenge.

In July 2026, McFeeters filed a second lawsuit with similar allegations in the Jefferson County Circuit Court. The case was dismissed on August 18, 2026 for lack of jurisdiction. On August 13, 2026, McFeeters additionally filed a federal lawsuit, which was dismissed one day later for lack of standing.

=== Quo warranto lawsuit ===
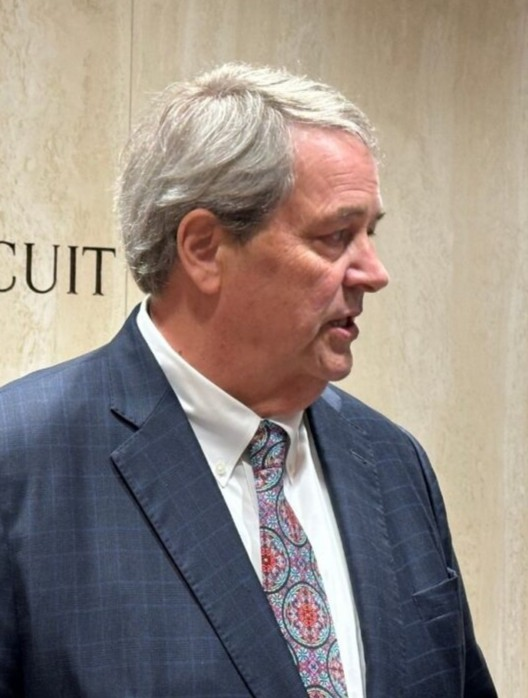
Birmingham lawyer Barry Ragsdale is an attorney for the plaintiffs.

On June 17, 2026, plaintiffs Brook Dorgan and Justin LeBlanc filed a lawsuit against Tuberville in the Montgomery County Circuit Court, which seeks a writ of quo warranto to invalidate Tuberville's candidacy. The complaint, citing voter registration records, tax records, campaign finance records, and quotes from Tuberville himself, alleges that Tuberville has not consistently maintained residence at his Auburn, Alabama property. The complaint requested an expedited jury trial, with plaintiffs' attorney Barry Ragsdale saying on a podcast, "We think that your average person who sits on a jury is just never, ever going to believe the stories that Tuberville makes up about where he lives." Tuberville filed a motion to dismiss the suit on June 22, 2026.

On July 9, 2026, Montgomery County Circuit Judge Brooke Reid dismissed the lawsuit for insufficient jurisdiction. The dismissal order cites a lack of case law concerning whether quo warranto may be applied for party nominees. However, Reid did affirm that the state constitution allows the judiciary to determine whether an individual satisfies the "clearly set forth and unambiguous" requirements to hold office, which Tuberville's lawyers had disputed. Reid did not render a verdict on the underlying question of Tuberville's eligibility.

On July 14, 2026, Ragsdale filed an appeal to the Alabama Supreme Court. The Supreme Court dismissed the appeal in a 7–0 ruling.

== See also ==
- 2026 United States elections
- 2026 Alabama elections

== Notes ==
Partisan clients
