= Kyle Sweetser =

American businessman and politician

Personal details
- Born: January 23, 1989 (age 37) Mobile, Alabama
- Party: Democratic (2025–present)
- Other political affiliations: Republican (before 2025)
- Occupation: Construction company owner
- Website: Campaign website

Kyle Sweetser is an American politician and construction company owner who ran as a candidate in the 2026 U.S. Senate election in Alabama. In 2024, Sweetser became a prominent Republican critic of Donald Trump, speaking out against his policies on tariffs and foreign affairs at the 2024 Democratic National Convention. In April 2025, Sweetser switched his party affiliation to the Democratic Party.

== Political career ==
=== 2024 presidential election ===
Preceding the 2024 election, Sweetser voted for Donald Trump in both the 2016 presidential election and the 2020 presidential election. However, following the January 6 United States Capitol attack and the 2022 Russian invasion of Ukraine, Sweetser discontinued his support for Trump. In the 2024 Republican Party presidential primaries, Sweetser supported Nikki Haley. In the months following Haley's withdrawal in March 2024, Sweetser endorsed Kamala Harris. In August 2024, Sweetser was invited alongside several other Republicans to speak at the 2024 Democratic National Convention, during which he made his opposition to protectionism the focus of his speech, saying that tariffs increase consumer costs and harm the construction industry. In October 2024, Sweetser appeared in a pro-Harris ad funded by the Future Forward PAC aimed at drawing Republican support for Kamala Harris, highlighting his concerns about the possibility of increased protectionism leading to higher consumer costs.

=== 2026 U.S. Senate campaign ===
In April 2025, Sweetser switched his party affiliation to the Democratic Party, and launched a campaign to challenge incumbent senator Tommy Tuberville in the 2026 election. Sweetser has distanced himself from further left wings of the Democratic Party, with senior advisor Craig Snyder comparing his campaign to that of former President Bill Clinton and his efforts in the New Democratic Movement, and Sweetser has said personally that he's "not left wing, period." In May 2025, Tuberville withdrew his re-election campaign for the U.S. Senate to run in the 2026 Alabama gubernatorial election. That same month, Sweetser joined former U.S. senator Doug Jones (2018–2021) and former U.S representative from TX-16, Beto O'Rourke (2013–2019) at a rally in Tuscaloosa, held in opposition to a coinciding appearance by Donald Trump at the University of Alabama. Sweetser ultimately received 13.9% of the vote in the primary held on May 19, 2026.
