= James Barton =

James or Jim Barton may refer to:

- James Barton (actor) (1890–1962), American vaudevillian and character actor
- James R. Barton (c. 1810–1856), sheriff of Los Angeles County, California
- Jim Barton (American football) (1934–2013), American football player
- Jim Barton (sailor) (born 1956), American Olympic sailor
- Jim Barton (Alabama politician) (born 1968), American politician in the Alabama House of Representatives
- Jamie Barton (politician), American politician in the Pennsylvania House of Representatives
- James Barton (Emmerdale), a fictional character from the British soap opera Emmerdale
- James L. Barton (1855–1936), American missionary in Turkey
