= 2026 United States Senate election in Alabama =

- November 3, 2026
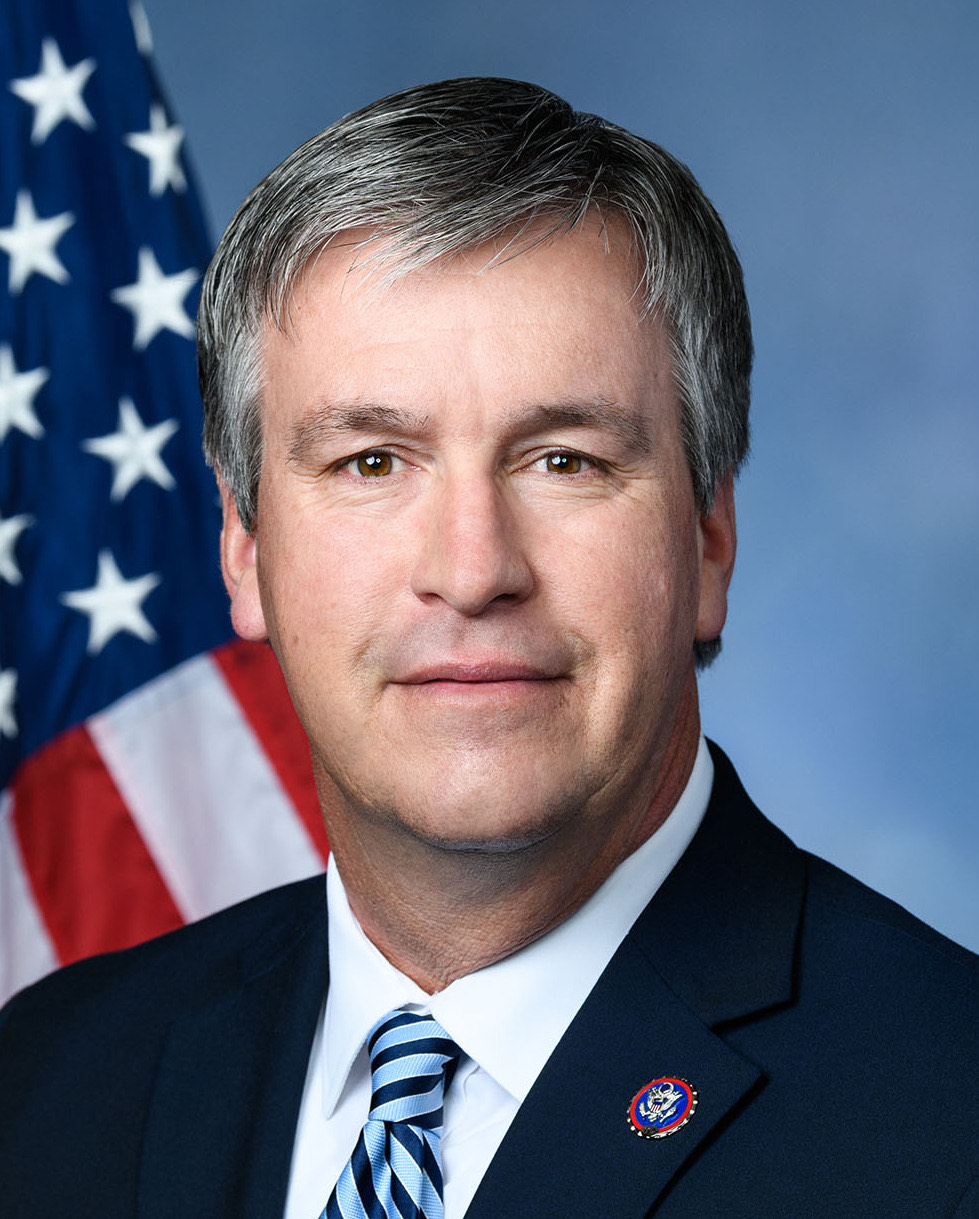

Nominee	Barry Moore	Everett Wess
Party	Republican	Democratic
Popular vote	917,338	759,321
Percentage	54.71%	45.29%
- Moore: 50–60% 60–70% 70–80% 80–90% Wess: 40–50% 50–60% 60–70% 70–80% 80–90%
U.S. senator before election
Tommy Tuberville
Republican
Elected U.S. senator
Barry Moore
Republican

The 2026 United States Senate election in Alabama was held on November 3, 2026, to elect a member of the United States Senate to represent the state of Alabama. Republican representative Barry Moore defeated Democratic attorney Everett Wess. Republican incumbent Tommy Tuberville did not seek a second term in order to run for governor.

Primary elections were held on May 19, which were followed by runoffs for both parties on June 16 after no candidates received a majority. Moore won the Republican runoff with 55.8% of the vote over businessman Jared Hudson and Wess won the Democratic runoff with 54.6% of the vote over businessman Dakarai Larriett.

Although Moore kept this seat in the GOP column, this was the closest regular Senate election in Alabama since 1996. Compared to 2020 when Tuberville won by 20.36%, Moore won by 9.42% in 2026, a decrease of nearly eleven percentage points.

== Republican primary ==
=== Candidates ===
==== Nominee ====
- Barry Moore, U.S. representative from AL-1 (2021–present)

==== Eliminated in runoff ====
- Jared Hudson, tactical training business owner and nominee for Jefferson County sheriff in 2022

==== Eliminated in primary ====
- Seth Burton, business development director and former Navy nuclear submarine commander
- Dale Deas Jr., cardiac surgeon and biomedical engineer
- Steve Marshall, attorney general of Alabama (2017–present)
- Rodney Walker, wholesale fuel company CEO

==== Withdrawn ====
- Morgan Murphy, former national security advisor to incumbent Tommy Tuberville (endorsed Moore, remained on ballot)
- Tommy Tuberville, incumbent U.S. senator (running for governor)

==== Declined ====
- Will Ainsworth, lieutenant governor of Alabama (2019–present)
- Mo Brooks, former U.S. representative from AL-5 (2011–2023) and candidate for U.S. Senate in 2017 and 2022 (ran for state representative)
- Paul Finebaum, sports radio personality
- A. J. McCarron, professional football player (ran for lieutenant governor)
- Gary Palmer, U.S. representative from Alabama's 6th congressional district (2015–present) (running for re-election)
- Bruce Pearl, former coach of Auburn Tigers men's basketball
- Dale Strong, U.S. representative from AL-5 (2023–present) (running for re-election)

=== Endorsements ===
Jared Hudson

Executive branch officials

- Markwayne Mullin, U.S. secretary of homeland security (2026–present) (Note: Mullin endorsed before he was Secretary of Homeland Security.)

U.S. senators

- Tim Sheehy, Montana (2025–present)

Individuals

- Riley Gaines, conservative activist
Barry Moore

Executive branch officials

- Donald Trump, president of the United States (2017–2021, 2025–present)
- JD Vance, vice president of the United States (2025–present)

U.S. senators

- Ted Budd, North Carolina (2023–present)
- Steve Daines, Montana (2015–present)
- Cynthia Lummis, Wyoming (2021–present)
- Bernie Moreno, Ohio (2025–present)
- Rick Scott, Florida (2019–present)
- Tim Scott, South Carolina (2013–present)
- John Thune, Senate majority leader (2025–present) from South Dakota (2005–present)

U.S. representatives

- Tim Burchett, TN-2 (2019–present)
- Warren Davidson, OH-8 (2016–present)
- Jim Jordan, OH-4 (2007–present)
- David McIntosh, former IN-2 (1995–2001)
- Troy Nehls, TX-22 (2021–present)
- Keith Self, TX-3 (2023–present)
- Glenn Thompson, PA-15 (2009–present)

Statewide officials

- Will Ainsworth, lieutenant governor of Alabama (2019–present)

State legislators

- Ed Henry, former state representative from the 9th district (2010–2018)
- Ken Johnson, former state representative from the 7th district (2010–2018)
- Jim McClendon, former state senator from the 11th district (2014–2022)
- Kurt Wallace, state representative from the 42nd district (2010–present)
- April Weaver, state senator from the 14th district (2021–present)

Individuals

- Brilyn Hollyhand, conservative activist
- Morgan Murphy, former national security advisor to incumbent Tommy Tuberville and former candidate for this seat

Organizations

- AIPAC
- Alabama Farmers Federation (Note: Endorsement received after the first round of primary voting.) (previously endorsed Marshall)
- Club for Growth
- Fairshake
- Republicans for National Renewal
- Senate Conservatives Fund
- Turning Point Action
Steve Marshall (eliminated)

Executive branch officials

- Tony Perkins, former chair of the Commission on International Religious Freedom (2019–2020)

State legislators

- Johnny Curry, former state representative from the 15th district (1986–2002)
- Jerry L. Fielding, former state senator from the 11th district (2010–2014)

Organizations

- Alabama Farmers Federation (endorsed Moore in the runoff)
- Associated Builders and Contractors of Alabama
Morgan Murphy (withdrawn)

Executive branch officials

- Ezra Cohen, former acting U.S. under secretary of defense for intelligence and security (2020–2021)
- Keith Kellogg, U.S. special envoy for Ukraine (2025–present)
- K. T. McFarland, former U.S. deputy national security advisor (2017)
- Christopher Miller, former acting U.S. secretary of defense (2020–2021)
- Sean Spicer, former White House press secretary (2017)

=== First round ===
==== Debates and forums ====
2026 Alabama Republican Senate primary debates and forums
No.	Date	Host	Moderator	Link	Republican	Republican	Republican	Republican	Republican	Republican	Republican
Key: P Participant A Absent N Not invited I Invited W Withdrawn											
Key: P Participant A Absent N Not invited I Invited W Withdrawn					Burton	Deas	Hudson	Marshall	Moore	Murphy	Walker
1	January 5, 2026	Mobile County GOP	N/A	N/A	A	A	P	A	A	P	P
2	January 8, 2026	Eastern Shore; Republican Women	N/A	N/A	A	A	A	A	A	P	P
3	March 10, 2026	Alabama Policy Action; Rightside Media; Yellowhammer News	Various	N/A	P	P	P	P	P	W	P

==== Fundraising ====
Italics indicate a candidate who has either withdrawn from the race, declined to run, or been eliminated in the primary.

Campaign finance reports as of April 29, 2026
Candidate	Raised	Spent	Cash on hand
Jared Hudson (R)	$1,543,189	$1,000,988	$542,200
Steve Marshall (R)	$1,395,256	$919,961	$475,294
Barry Moore (R)	$2,499,190	$2,149,124	$475,197
Rodney Walker (R)	$2,012,949	$2,013,628	$0
Source: Federal Election Commission

==== Polling ====
Poll source	Date(s) administered	Sample size (Note: Key: A – all adults RV – registered voters LV – likely voters V – unclear)	Margin of error	Jared Hudson	Steve Marshall	Barry Moore	Morgan Murphy	Rodney Walker	Other	Undecided
Quantus Insights (R)	May 15–17, 2026	680 (LV)	± 3.8%	36%	14%	27%	0%	1%	5% (Note: Burton with 3%, Deas with 2%)	18%
Remington Research Group (R)	May 5–7, 2026	589 (LV)	–	20%	16%	23%	1%	1%	3% (Note: 2% for Deas, 1% for Burton)	36%
Cygnal (R) (Note: Poll conducted for Gray Television and Alabama Daily News)	April 29–30, 2026	500 (LV)	± 4.4%	25% (Note: With voters who lean towards a given candidate)	25%	36%	—N/a	—N/a	4%	
Cygnal (R)	April 29–30, 2026	500 (LV)	± 4.4%	19%	14%	23%	—N/a	—N/a	40%	
Tarrance Group (R) (Note: Poll sponsored by Alabama Strong, which supports Marshall)	April 11–14, 2026	500 (LV)	± 4.9%	24%	27%	28%	—N/a	—N/a	14%	7%
Peak Insights (R) (Note: Poll sponsored by Moore's campaign)	April 11–13, 2026	500 (LV)	± 4.0%	12%	16%	34%	—N/a	2%	2% (Note: Burton with 1%, someone else with 1%, Deas with <0.5%)	32%
American Pulse Research (R)	March 30 – April 1, 2026	505 (LV)	± 4.4%	14%	21%	26%	—N/a	—N/a	3%	35%
The Alabama Poll	March 22–24, 2026	600 (LV)	± 4.0%	19%	21%	23%	—N/a	3%	—N/a	34%
Pulse Decision Science (R) (Note: Poll sponsored by Club for Growth, which supports Moore)	March 16–19, 2026	501 (LV)	± 4.4%	13%	26%	31%	9% (Note: "Other three candidates combined" with 9%)			21%
	March 9, 2026	Murphy withdraws from the race								
Remington Research Group (R)	March 2–4, 2026	692 (LV)	± 3.7%	12%	16%	22%	1%	1%	1% (Note: Burton with 1%, Deas with 0%)	47%
The Alabama Poll	February 1–4, 2026	500 (LV)	± 4.4%	8%	26%	17%	1%	4%	—N/a	43%
Remington Research Group (R)	January 16–19, 2026	775 (LV)	± 3.5%	10%	26%	13%	1%	2%	—N/a	48%
The Alabama Poll	December 15, 2025	600 (LV)	± 4.0%	8%	30%	12%	1%	3%	—N/a	46%
Quantus Insights (R)	October 13–14, 2025	1,050 (RV)	± 3.2%	27%	24%	9%	2%	2%	—N/a	36%
The Alabama Poll	August 24–26, 2025	600 (LV)	± 4.0%	7%	37%	16%	—N/a	1%	—N/a	40%
McLaughlin & Associates (R) (Note: Poll sponsored by Marshall's campaign)	July 14–17, 2025	600 (LV)	± 4.0%	9%	35%	12%	—N/a	—N/a	—N/a	44%

Hypothetical polling

Poll source	Date(s) administered	Sample size	Margin of error	Will Ainsworth	Caroleene Dobson	Jared Hudson	Steve Marshall	Barry Moore	Bruce Pearl	Undecided
Cygnal (R) (Note: Poll commissioned by the Business Council of Alabama)	July 2025	400 (LV)	–	—N/a	—N/a	3%	24%	9%	13%	51%
Remington Research Group (R)	May 12–13, 2025	505 (LV)	± 4.0%	—N/a	13%	—N/a	28%	10%	—N/a	48%
Remington Research Group (R)	May 12–13, 2025	505 (LV)	± 4.0%	13%	9%	—N/a	21%	—N/a	9%	48%
Remington Research Group (R)	May 12–13, 2025	505 (LV)	± 4.0%	—N/a	—N/a	—N/a	37%	11%	—N/a	52%

==== Results ====
Primary results by county: Moore: 20–30%; 30–40%; 40–50%; 50–60%; 60–70%; 70–80%; Hudson: 30–40%; 40–50%; Marshall: 20–30%; 30–40%; 50–60%

Republican primary results
Party	Candidate	Votes	%
Republican	Barry Moore	189,067	39.2
Republican	Jared Hudson	123,672	25.6
Republican	Steve Marshall	118,361	24.5
Republican	Rodney Walker	19,697	4.1
Republican	Seth Burton	15,142	3.1
Republican	Dale Shelton Deas Jr.	10,117	2.1
Republican	Morgan Murphy (withdrawn)	6,485	1.3
Total votes		482,541	100.0

=== Runoff ===
==== Polling ====
Poll source	Date(s) administered	Sample size	Margin of error	Jared Hudson	Barry Moore	Undecided
co/efficient (R)	June 3–4, 2026	600 (LV)	± 4.0%	37%	46%	17%
Strategy Management	May 29 – June 4, 2026	1,300 (LV)	± 2.7%	42%	37%	20%
The Alabama Poll	May 28, 2026	600 (LV)	± 4.0%	49%	39%	12%
Remington Research Group (R) (Note: Poll commissioned by the Alabama Conservatives PAC, which supports Hudson)	May 21–22, 2026	722 (LV)	± 4.0%	41%	40%	19%
Pulse Decision Science (R)	May 17–18, 2026	518 (LV)	± 4.4%	36%	53%	11%

==== Results ====
Runoff results by county: Moore: 50–60%; 60–70%; 70–80%; 80–90%; Hudson: 50–60%; 60–70%; Tie: 50%

Republican primary runoff results
Party	Candidate	Votes	%
Republican	Barry Moore	173,674	55.8
Republican	Jared Hudson	137,545	44.2
Total votes		311,219	100.0

== Democratic primary ==
=== Candidates ===
==== Nominee ====
- Everett Wess, attorney and perennial candidate

==== Eliminated in runoff ====
- Dakarai Larriett, petcare business owner

==== Eliminated in primary ====
- Kyle Sweetser, construction company owner and 2024 Democratic National Convention speaker
- Mark Wheeler II, chemist

==== Disqualified ====
- Lamont Lavender, veteran

==== Withdrawn ====
- Greg Howard, podcaster (ran for U.S. House)

==== Declined ====
- Doug Jones, former U.S. senator (2018–2021) (running for governor)

=== Endorsements ===
Dakarai Larriett

State legislators

- Patricia Todd, former state representative from the 54th district (2006–2018) and former vice chair of the Alabama Democratic Party (2019–2022)
Everett Wess

Organizations

- Alabama Democratic Conference
Mark Wheeler II (eliminated)

Organizations

- Alabama Cannabis Coalition
Kyle Sweetser (eliminated)

U.S. representatives

- Barbara Comstock, former VA-10 (2015–2019) (Republican)
- Parker Griffith, former AL-05 (2009–2011) (Note: Griffith was elected as a Democrat and switched to the Republican Party 11 months into his first term, he was also an Independent from 2013 to 2014. He became a Democrat again in 2014.)
- Adam Kinzinger, former IL-16 (2011–2023) (Republican)
- Joe Walsh, former IL-08 (2011–2013) (Democratic; elected as a Republican)

State legislators

- Anthony Daniels, minority leader of the Alabama House of Representatives (2017–present) from the 53rd district (2014–present)
- Barbara Drummond, state representative from the 103rd district (2014–present)
- Kenyatté Hassell, state representative from the 78th district (2021–present)
- Patrice McClammy, state representative from the 76th district (2021–present)
- Bobby Singleton, minority leader of the Alabama Senate (2019–present) from the 24th district (2005–present)

==== Fundraising ====
Italics indicate a candidate who has either withdrawn from the race, declined to run, or been eliminated in the primary.

Campaign finance reports as of April 29, 2026
Candidate	Raised	Spent	Cash on hand
Dakarai Larriett (D)	$136,063	$126,564	$9,499
Kyle Sweetser (D)	$159,035	$153,101	$5,933
Mark Wheeler II (D)	$17,148	$16,759	$389
Source: Federal Election Commission

==== Results ====
Primary results by county: Wess: 30–40%; 40–50%; 50–60%; 60–70%; Larriett: 20–30%; 30–40%; Wheeler: 20–30%; 30–40%; Sweetser: 30–40%

Democratic primary results
Party	Candidate	Votes	%
Democratic	Everett Wess	132,373	39.8
Democratic	Dakarai Larriett	96,307	28.9
Democratic	Mark S. Wheeler II	57,947	17.4
Democratic	Kyle Sweetser	46,286	13.9
Total votes		332,913	100.0

=== Runoff ===
==== Results ====
Runoff results by county: Wess: 50–60%; 60–70%; 70–80%; Larriett: 50–60%; 60–70%

Democratic primary runoff results
Party	Candidate	Votes	%
Democratic	Everett Wess	49,396	54.6
Democratic	Dakarai Larriett	41,065	45.4
Total votes		90,461	100.0

== Third-party and independent candidates ==
=== Independent candidates ===
==== Declared ====
- Craig Jelks, educator and candidate for mayor of Charleston, South Carolina, in 2011

== General election ==
=== Predictions ===
Source	Ranking	As of
The Cook Political Report	Solid R	November 2, 2026
Decision Desk HQ	Safe R	November 3, 2026
The Economist (Note: The Economist's prediction model uses unconventional terminology. For the purpose of equivalency, their "Very Likely" ratings are formatted as a "Likely" rating while "Likely" ratings are formatted as a "Lean" rating.)	Safe R	November 3, 2026
FiftyPlusOne	Safe R	November 3, 2026
Fox News	Solid R	November 1, 2026
Inside Elections	Solid R	October 29, 2026
MS NOW	Safe R	October 29, 2026
NBC News	Solid R	November 3, 2026
RealClearPolitics	Solid R	November 2, 2026
Sabato's Crystal Ball	Safe R	November 2, 2026
Silver Bulletin	Solid R	November 3, 2026
Split Ticket	Safe R	November 2, 2026

=== Post-primary endorsements ===
Barry Moore (R)

Organizations

- NRA Political Victory Fund
Everett Wess (D)

Labor unions

- Alabama AFL-CIO
- United Mine Workers of America COMPAC

=== Fundraising ===
Campaign finance reports as of October 14, 2026
Candidate	Raised	Spent	Cash on hand
Barry Moore (R)	$4,635,926	$4,293,858	$467,199
Everett Wess (D)	$128,570	$118,027	$10,543
Source: Federal Election Commission

=== Polling ===
Aggregate polls

Source of poll aggregation	Dates administered	Dates updated	Barry Moore (R)	Everett Wess (D)	Other/ Undecided (Note: Calculated by taking the difference of 100% and all other candidates combined.)	Margin
270toWin	October 15–24, 2026	October 28, 2026	52.7%	36.0%	11.3%	Moore +16.7%
Silver Bulletin	through October 24, 2026	November 3, 2026	51.0%	37.1%	11.9%	Moore +13.9%
Average			51.6%	36.6%	11.8%	Moore +15.0%

Poll source	Date(s) administered	Sample size	Margin of error	Barry Moore (R)	Everett Wess (D)	Other	Undecided
Blueprint Polling (D)	October 22–24, 2026	695 (LV)	± 3.7%	48%	40%	—	12%
Cygnal (R) (Note: Poll conducted for Alabama Daily News and Gray Media Alabama)	October 16–17, 2026	500 (LV)	± 4.38%	50%	35%	—	15%
The Alabama Poll	October 15–16, 2026	600 (LV)	—	56%	35%	—	9%
RMG Research (R) (Note: Poll conducted for Alabama Policy Action)	September 21–25, 2026	800 (RV)	± 3.5%	54%	33%	—	13%
yes. every kid.	July 8–11, 2026	601 (LV)	± 4.0%	47%	32%	1% (Note: "Someone else/Other" with 1%)	20%

=== Results ===
2026 United States Senate election in Alabama
Party	Candidate	Votes	%	±%
Republican	Barry Moore	917,338	54.71	−5.39
Democratic	Everett Wess	759,321	45.29	+5.55
Total votes		1,676,659	100.0	N/A
Republican hold				

Counties that flipped from Republican to Democratic

- Barbour (largest city: Eufaula)
- Clarke (largest city: Jackson)
- Madison (largest city: Huntsville)
- Mobile (largest city: Mobile)
- Tuscaloosa (largest city: Tuscaloosa)

==== By congressional district ====
Moore won five congressional districts, while Wess won two congressional districts.

District	Wess	Moore	Representative
1st	40.97%	59.02%	Jerry Carl
2nd	51.88%	48.11%	Shomari Figures
3rd	36.37%	63.62%	Mike Rogers
4th	25.80%	74.17%	Robert Aderholt
5th	46.21%	53.79%	Dale Strong
6th	43.35%	56.55%	Gary Palmer
7th	68.33%	31.59%	Terri Sewell

== Notes ==
Partisan clients
