= Ben C. Rain High School =

Public high school in Mobile, Alabama

Location
- 3125 Dauphin Island Pkwy; Mobile, Alabama 36605; United States
- 30.6076°N 88.0737°W

Information
- Type: Public
- Established: 1959
- School district: Mobile County Public School System
- Superintendent: Chresal D. Threadgill
- Principal: Kerensa Williams
- Staff: 42.00 (FTE)
- Grades: 9-12
- Campus size: 587 (2023–2024)
- Colors: Red, Gray
- Accreditation: Southern Association of Colleges and Schools
- Website: www.bcrainhighschool.com

Ben C. Rain High School is a public high school in Mobile, Alabama. In 2022, the school was 89 percent African American, six percent Hispanic, and four percent White. Ninety percent of students were economically disadvantaged and the school's test scores were well below state and district averages.

Velma L. Blackwell was its first African American teacher in 1967.

Red Raiders are the mascot. Its football team competes in 5A. Brent Dearmon coached at the school. Rick Pietri also coached at the school. In 2023, a stadium was built for the school. It is named for teacher, coach, and principal Ben Glover.

== History ==
B. C. Rain High School was built in 1959, although the school itself did not begin accepting students until 1963.

In 1977, a group of students were arrested after a school bus driver discovered that some students on board were in possession of alcohol.

In 1997, the Associated Press reported that an 18-year-old student was shot in the legs by a jealous student in an attempt to end his basketball career. The student did not lose his legs, but they became less functional.

== Alumni ==
- Mike Dean, politician and former football player
- Eddie Freeman, NFL defensive lineman
- Rusty Glover, politician and former teacher
- Derreck Hamilton, professional basketball player
- Rodney Hudson, football player
- Henry Monroe, football player
