= Dexter Grimsley =

American politician (born 1970)

Member of the Alabama House of Representatives from the 85th district
- In office November 3, 2010 – November 10, 2022
- Preceded by: Locy Baker
- Succeeded by: Rick Rehm

Personal details
- Born: November 11, 1970 (age 55) Abbeville, Alabama
- Party: Democratic
- Education: Northwestern State University

Dexter Grimsley (born November 11, 1970) is an American politician who served as a Democrat in the Alabama House of Representatives from the 85th district from 2010 to 2022, representing Henry and Houston counties.

Grimsley worked as a state probation officer for 19 years, but after being re-elected to a second four-year term as state representative, was told he could not hold two state positions. He has said that he needed to have a second job to support his family financially and was only five years from retirement.

Grimsley served three terms in the state legislature. He was unseated in 2022 when he was defeated in his bid for re-election by Republican candidate Rick Rehm. currently coach at Alma mater Abbeville high school
