= Locy Baker =

American politician

Member of the Alabama House of Representatives from the 85th district
- In office November 9, 1994 – November 3, 2010
- Preceded by: John Beasley
- Succeeded by: Dexter Grimsley

Personal details
- Born: November 19, 1945 (age 80) Abbeville, Alabama
- Party: Democratic

Locy Baker (born November 19, 1945) is an American politician who served in the Alabama House of Representatives from the 85th district from 1994 to 2010.
