= Henry Monroe =

American football player (born 1956)

No. 43, 24
- Position: Defensive back

Personal information
- Born: December 30, 1956 (age 69); Mobile, Alabama, U.S.
- Listed height: 5 ft 11 in (1.80 m)
- Listed weight: 180 lb (82 kg)

Career information
- High school: B. C. Rain (Mobile, Alabama)
- College: Mississippi State (1975–1978)
- NFL draft: 1979: 7th round, 180th overall pick

Career history
- Green Bay Packers (1979); Philadelphia Eagles (1979, 1981); San Diego Chargers (1982)*
- * Offseason or practice squad member only

Career NFL statistics
- Games played: 6
- Stats at Pro Football Reference

Henry Evans Monroe, Jr. (born December 30, 1956) is an American former professional football player. He played college football for the Mississippi State Bulldogs and was selected by the Green Bay Packers in the seventh round of the 1979 NFL draft as a defensive back. He later played for the Philadelphia Eagles and had a brief stint with the San Diego Chargers.

== Early life and college career ==
Monroe was born on December 30, 1956, in Mobile, Alabama. He attended Ben C. Rain High School where he competed in football and track and field. In track, he was an All-County performer in the 4 × 440 yards relay, while in football, he was a two-time All-County and All-Region selection at halfback. As a senior with the football team, he ran for 938 yards and nine touchdowns. In high school, he was also a member of the National Honor Society and the Fellowship of Christian Athletes. He signed to play college football for the Mississippi State Bulldogs.

Monroe attended Mississippi State University from 1975 to 1978, receiving varsity letters with the football team in his last three years. He was a backup cornerback for the Bulldogs in 1976. He became a starter with four games left in the 1977 season and remained a starter as a senior in 1978. He also played for the Bulldogs special teams on the kickoff and punt units. Prior to the last game of the 1978 season, Monroe had totaled 49 tackles, three pass deflections and an interception.

== Professional career ==
Monroe was selected by the Green Bay Packers in the seventh round (180th overall) of the 1979 NFL draft. He made the team and appeared in the first three games of the season. In Week 2, against the New Orleans Saints, Monroe recovered an onside kick that helped the Packers make a comeback victory. However, he suffered an ankle injury in the game and was then placed on injured reserve on September 20, 1979. He was later released by the Packers on November 24. During his time with the Packers, he had mainly been used on special teams, with occasional use as a nickelback.

On November 27, Monroe signed with the Philadelphia Eagles as a replacement for the injured Al Latimer. He appeared in three games for the Eagles as a backup cornerback. In July 1980, he retired to enter medical school. He came out of retirement and re-signed with the Eagles on July 23, 1981, but was released on August 10. Monroe signed with the San Diego Chargers in April 1982 but was later released. He concluded his professional career with six games played. By the year 2000, he was a physician assistant living in Altadena, California.
