= Will Boyd =

American politician

Personal details
- Born: 1971 or 1972 (age 54–55) Florence, South Carolina, U.S.
- Party: Democratic
- Education: University of South Carolina (BS); Regis University (MBA); Christian Bible College (attended); Capella University (PhD); Saint James the Elder University (PsyD)

Will Boyd (born 1971 or 1972) is an American politician, pastor, and perennial candidate as a member of the Democratic Party. He was the Democratic nominee in the 2018 Alabama lieutenant gubernatorial election and the 2022 United States Senate election in Alabama.

== Political career ==
=== Political offices ===
Boyd served on the city council in Greenville, Illinois, from 2009 to 2011. He also served as the chair of the Lauderdale County, Alabama, Democratic Executive Committee in 2017.

=== 2016 U.S. House campaign ===
Boyd first ran for major political office in his run for Alabama's 5th congressional district in 2016. He ran against incumbent Republican representative Mo Brooks. He accused Brooks of skipping debates, after Brooks was not present at five events that Boyd attended. Boyd lost the general election on November 8, 2016, receiving 33% of the vote.

=== 2017 U.S. Senate campaign ===
Boyd ran for United States Senate in a 2017 special election. He described himself as a pro-gun Democrat and pushed for $3.3 billion in public works projects. He stated that Donald Trump was "the type of president ... that a Democrat can work with. He lost the Democratic primary on August 15, 2017, to Doug Jones. Boyd finished in fourth with 5% of the vote.

=== 2018 lieutenant gubernatorial campaign ===
Boyd ran for Lieutenant Governor of Alabama in 2018 as the Democratic nominee, against Republican nominee Will Ainsworth. He campaigned on prioritizing education funding and workplace readiness. He stated that his goal was to make Alabama the number one state in education. In the campaign, he also stated his support for legalization of marijuana. He was defeated in the general election, receiving 37% of the vote on November 6.

=== 2022 U.S. Senate campaign ===
Boyd announced his 2022 campaign for United States Senate in January 2022. Ahead of the primary election, he stated that he was feeling confident in his chances of victory. He won the Democratic primary on May 24, defeating two other candidates. In his general election campaign, he stated his support for the American Civil Liberties Union's claim of voter suppression in Alabama, which was denied by then-Secretary of State John Merrill. He also described Alabama as appearing like a "hate state" in an interview. In fundraising, he raised far less money than Republican nominee Katie Britt, who had raised over $9.8 million, while Boyd reported less than $10,000 in early October. In the general election on November 8, he was defeated by Britt and received 31% of the vote.

=== 2026 gubernatorial campaign ===
Boyd announced his campaign for Governor of Alabama in early June 2025, in the Democratic primary. In August, he received support from the Alabama Cannabis Coalition. Boyd came in second in the primary with 9.7% of the vote, losing to former U.S. Senator Doug Jones.

Party political offices
Preceded by Ron Crumpton	Democratic nominee for U.S. Senator from Alabama (Class 3); 2022	Most recent
