= Eddie Freeman (gridiron football) =

American gridiron football player (born 1978)

No. 71
- Position: Defensive tackle

Personal information
- Born: January 4, 1978 (age 48); Mobile, Alabama, U.S.
- Listed height: 6 ft 5 in (1.96 m)
- Listed weight: 315 lb (143 kg)

Career information
- High school: Rain (Mobile, Alabama)
- College: UAB
- NFL draft: 2002: 2nd round, 43rd overall pick

Career history
- Kansas City Chiefs (2002–2003); Arizona Cardinals (2004)*; Jacksonville Jaguars (2004); Carolina Panthers (2005)*; Rhein Fire (2005); Kansas City Chiefs (2006)*; Cologne Centurions (2006); New England Patriots (2006)*; Orlando Predators (2007); Calgary Stampeders (2007–2008)
- * Offseason or practice squad member only

Awards and highlights
- Grey Cup champion (2008)
- Stats at Pro Football Reference
- Stats at CFL.ca

Eddie V. Freeman (born January 4, 1978) is an American former professional football defensive tackle who played in the National Football League (NFL) and Canadian Football League (CFL).

== Professional career ==
Pre-draft measurables
Height	Weight	Arm length	Hand span	40-yard dash	10-yard split	20-yard split	20-yard shuttle	Three-cone drill	Vertical jump	Broad jump	Bench press
6 ft 5 1/8 in (1.96 m)	310 lb (141 kg)	33 1/2 in (0.85 m)	9 1/2 in (0.24 m)	4.92 s	1.73 s	2.87 s	4.81 s	7.85 s	34.5 in (0.88 m)	9 ft 3 in (2.82 m)	32 reps
All values from NFL Combine

Freeman was drafted out of UAB in the second round of the 2002 NFL draft by the Kansas City Chiefs and played for them for two years. He signed with the Arizona Cardinals on September 8, 2004, and then the Jacksonville Jaguars on December 1, 2004. He signed with the Carolina Panthers on January 27, 2005, and then returned to the Chiefs on January 11, 2006, but moved on again to the New England Patriots as a free agent on July 31, 2006.

Freeman signed as a free agent with the Calgary Stampeders on November 1, 2007, in time for the final game of the 2007 regular season. In the 2008 CFL season, Freeman played in all 18 regular season games and recorded 25 tackles and 3 quarterback sacks. The Stampeders won the 96th Grey Cup championship against the Montreal Alouettes on November 23, 2008, and Freeman became a free agent on February 16, 2009.
