= Jerry Carl =

American politician (born 1958)

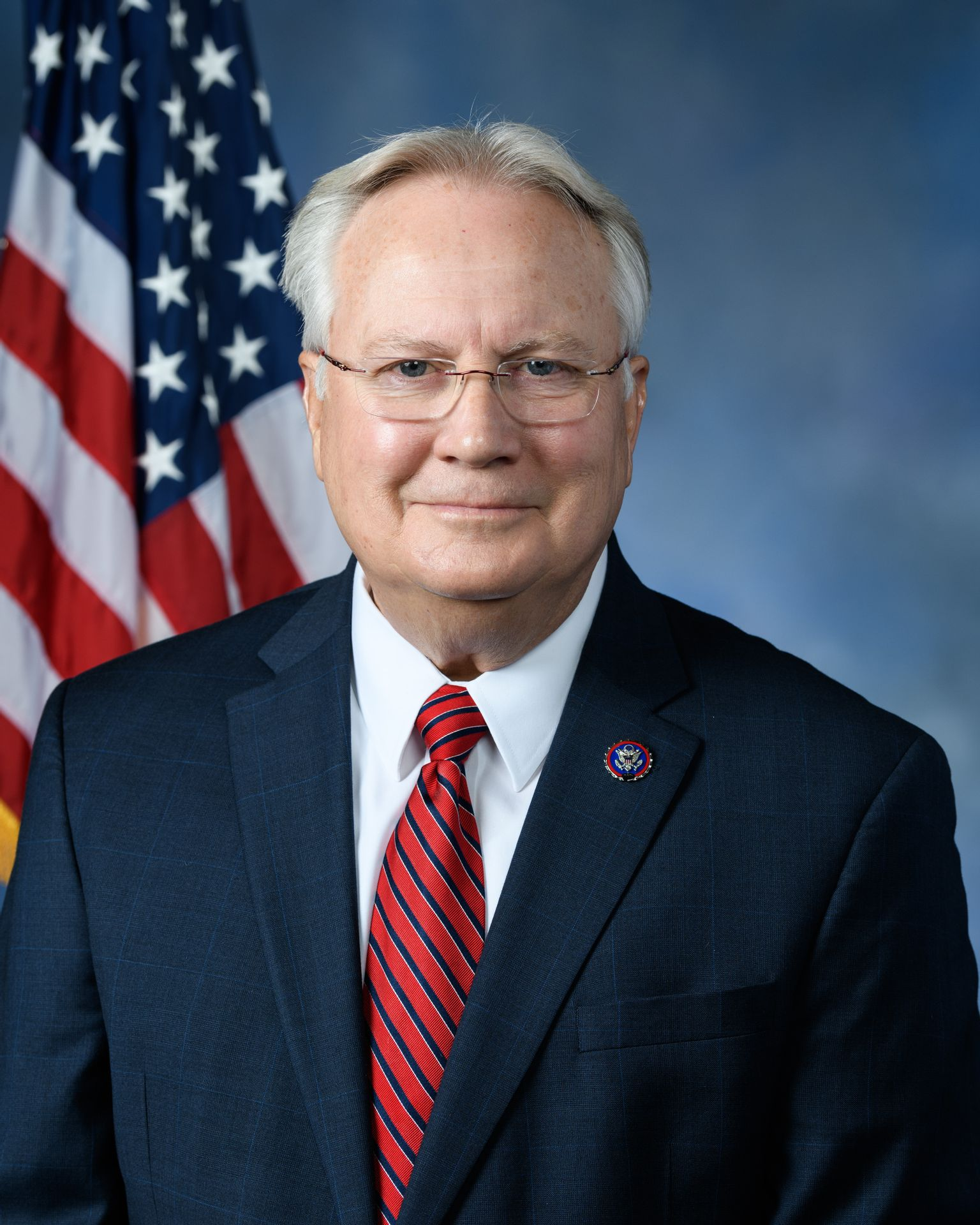
- Official portrait, 2021

Member-elect of the U.S. House of Representatives from Alabama's 1st district
- Assuming office January 3, 2027
- Succeeding: Barry Moore (redistricted)
- In office January 3, 2021 – January 3, 2025
- Preceded by: Bradley Byrne
- Succeeded by: Barry Moore (redistricted)

Member of the Mobile County Commission
- In office November 14, 2012 – November 11, 2020
- Preceded by: Mike Dean
- Succeeded by: Randall Dueitt

Personal details
- Born: Jerry Lee Carl Jr. June 17, 1958 (age 68) Mobile, Alabama, U.S.
- Party: Republican
- Spouse: Tina Carl (m. 1981)
- Children: 2
- Education: Florida Gateway College (attended)
- Website: Campaign website

Jerry Lee Carl Jr. (born June 17, 1958) is an American politician and businessman who is the member-elect for Alabama's 1st congressional district, having previously served as U.S. representative for that district from 2021 to 2025. A member of the Republican Party, he previously served as a member of the Mobile County Commission from 2012 to 2020, the last two years as president of the commission. His district is based entirely in southern Alabama, encompassing parts of Mobile along with all of the state's portion of the Gulf Coast.

In 2019, Carl announced his candidacy for the House seat being vacated by incumbent Republican Bradley Byrne. He defeated former state senator Bill Hightower in a runoff for the Republican nomination and Democrat James Averhart in the general election. He was reelected in 2022, defeating Libertarian candidate Alexander Remrey; no Democrat filed to run.

In 2024, following redistricting as a result of Allen v. Milligan, Carl ran against fellow incumbent representative Barry Moore in the Republican primary and lost renomination. He ran again for his old seat in 2026, following Moore's retirement to run in the 2026 Senate election. He defeated his Democratic opponent, Clyde Jones, by 18 percentage points.

== Early life and education ==
A native of Mobile, Alabama, Carl graduated from Sylacauga High School in 1977. He attended Lake City Community College (now Florida Gateway College) for a time, but left to move back to Mobile and start his first business.

== Career ==
After leaving community college, Carl worked for Alabama Power. He then worked for Burford Equipment Company and as a salesman for various companies in Mobile. In 1989, Carl established Stat Medical, a healthcare equipment business. He later worked as a manager at Rotech Medical before establishing a real estate development firm. Carl founded Carl and Associates, a management group, in 2003. He then started Cricket and Butterfly, LLC, a lumber and timber company.

Carl ran for Mobile County Commission in 2012. He defeated incumbent Mike Dean in the Republican primary election in April, and won the general election in November. He was reelected over Margie Wilcox in 2016. In 2019, Carl was selected to serve as Commission President.

== U.S. House of Representatives ==
=== Elections ===
==== 2020 ====
In June 2020, Carl announced he would run for the 1st district, which was being vacated by incumbent and fellow Republican Bradley Byrne. He faced former state senator Bill Hightower, State Representative Chris Pringle, and two others in the Republican primary. Carl narrowly defeated Hightower in the primary, and they went to a runoff election. Carl defeated Democratic nominee James Averhart in the general election with 64.4% of the vote. The 1st has been in Republican hands without interruption since 1965, and the Democrats have only managed 40% of the vote once since then.

The 1st typically gives its incumbents very long tenures in Washington. When Carl took office on January 2, 2021, he became only the seventh person to hold the seat since 1919; all but one of his six predecessors held it for at least 10 years.

==== 2022 ====
Carl was reelected in 2022.

==== 2024 ====
In 2024, redistricting as a result of Allen v. Milligan placed both Carl and fellow incumbent representative Barry Moore in the same district, setting up a primary in which Carl and Moore were both incumbents pitted against each other in the 1st district. On October 30, 2023, Moore confirmed to 1819 News that he would run in the first congressional district, challenging Carl in the Republican primary.

The new 1st was more Carl's district than Moore's; Carl retained over 60 percent of his former territory. Despite this, in the Republican primary on March 5, 2024, Carl lost the Republican nomination to Moore by 3.4%.

=== Tenure ===
Jerry Carl explains why he opposed the American Rescue Plan in 2021.

==== 117th Congress (2021–2023) ====
One of Carl's first votes upon joining Congress was opposing the second impeachment of Donald Trump. He said he voted against impeachment because he believed the articles of impeachment "failed to reach the necessary threshold for impeachment." He also called impeachment "Nancy Pelosi's personal vendetta against President Trump." Carl voted against the American Rescue Plan in March 2021, saying the bill was rushed after the passing of the Consolidated Appropriations Act, 2021 and that it was too big and would add to the increasing national debt.

As of January 2023, Carl had voted in line with Joe Biden's stated position 9.7% of the time.

=== Committee assignments ===
For the 118th Congress:

- Committee on Appropriations
  - Subcommittee on Agriculture, Rural Development, Food and Drug Administration, and Related Agencies
  - Subcommittee on Financial Services and General Government
  - Subcommittee on State, Foreign Operations, and Related Programs
- Committee on Natural Resources
  - Subcommittee on Indian and Insular Affairs
  - Subcommittee on Water, Wildlife and Fisheries

=== Caucus memberships ===
- Republican Study Committee

== Political positions ==
Selected roll call votes for Rep. Jerry Carl
Issue	Vote	Date	Source
Object to PA electoral votes	Yea	January 7, 2021	
Second Trump impeachment	Nay	January 13, 2021	
Equality Act	Nay	February 25, 2021	
For the People Act	Nay	March 3, 2021	
DREAM Act	Nay	March 18, 2021	
ESG Disclosure Simplification Act	Nay	June 16, 2021	
Remove Capitol Confederate statues	Nay	June 29, 2021	
End support for Saudis	Nay	September 23, 2021	
Infrastructure Investment Act	Nay	November 5, 2021	
Bipartisan Safer Communities Act	Nay	June 24, 2022	
CHIPS and Science Act	Nay	July 28, 2022	
Respect for Marriage Act	Nay	December 8, 2022	

Carl is a self-described conservative.

=== Abortion ===
Carl is anti-abortion, saying in a campaign advertisement that "it's immoral to stop a beating heart". He has similarly promised to "protect the unborn." Carl called Roe v. Wade "disastrous" and supported its overturning in 2022.

=== Economy ===
During the 2023 United States debt-ceiling crisis, Carl voted for the Fiscal Responsibility Act of 2023.

=== Immigration ===
In a 2020 television campaign advertisement, Carl said he would "stand with Trump, build the wall and end handouts for lawbreaking illegals."

=== Israel ===
Carl says that Israel is "America's most important regional ally." He supports its right to defend itself. He voted to provide Israel with support following 2023 Hamas attack on Israel.

=== Gun control ===
Carl has said, "As a conservative, I'll stop liberals from destroying the Second Amendment." In 2020, the NRA Political Victory Fund graded Carl "AQ" and endorsed him. He was given an "A" grade and endorsed in 2022.

=== Impeachment of Donald Trump ===
Carl voted against the second impeachment of Donald Trump, and voted to object to Pennsylvania's and Arizona's electors during the 2021 United States Electoral College vote count.

=== Climate change ===
Carl opposed President Joe Biden's moratorium on oil and gas production, saying it would destroy as many as 24,000 jobs in Alabama.

=== Vote to overturn 2020 election ===
On January 6, 2021, Carl was one of 147 Republican lawmakers who voted to overturn results in the 2020 presidential election.

== Personal life ==
Carl married Tina in 1981, and they have two children. Carl is a Baptist.

== Electoral history ==
Electoral history of Jerry Carl
Year	Office	Party	Primary						General			Result	Swing
Year	Office	Party	Total	%	P.	Runoff	%	P.	Total	%	P.	Result	Swing
2020	U.S. Representative	Republican	38,359	38.71%	1st	44,421	52.28%	1st	211,825	64.37%	1st	Won	Hold
2022	U.S. Representative	Republican							140,592	83.61%	1st	Won	Hold

U.S. House of Representatives
Preceded by Bradley Byrne	Member of the U.S. House of Representatives from Alabama's 1st congressional district 2021–2025	Succeeded by Barry Moore
Preceded by Barry Moore	Member of the U.S. House of Representatives from Alabama's 1st congressional district Taking office 2027	Elect
U.S. order of precedence (ceremonial)
Preceded by Bob Dold as Former U.S. Representative	Order of precedence of the United States as Former U.S. Representative	Succeeded by Tom Andrews as Former U.S. Representative
