= Margie Wilcox =

American politician

Member of the Alabama House of Representatives from the 104th district
- Incumbent
- Assumed office February 5, 2014
- Preceded by: Jim Barton

Personal details
- Born: Mobile, Alabama
- Party: Republican

Julia Margaret Wilcox is an American businessperson and politician from Alabama. She is a Republican member of Alabama House of Representatives for district 104.

== Early life ==
Wilcox was born and raised in Theodore, Alabama. In 1980, Wilcox graduated from Theodore High School.

== Career ==
In 1980, Wilcox became the CEO of Mobile Bay Transportation. She owns transportation companies in Mobile, Alabama, including Mobile Bay Transportation Company and Yellow Cab of Mobile.

Wilcox ran as a Republican in the special election on February 4, 2014, for the Alabama House of Representatives seat for District 104. She succeeded Jim Barton, who resigned in August 2013.

In 2016, Wilcox ran for the Mobile County Commission against Jerry Carl and was defeated.
