= Rick Rehm =

Alabama state representative

Member of the Alabama House of Representatives from the 85th district
- Incumbent
- Assumed office November 10, 2022
- Preceded by: Dexter Grimsley

Personal details
- Born: January 19, 1966 (age 60) Chicago, Illinois, U.S.
- Party: Republican
- Profession: Army veteran, facility manager

Rick Rehm (born January 19, 1966) is an American politician who serves in the Alabama House of Representatives, representing the 85th district since 2022. A member of the Republican Party, Rehm represents a district that includes both Henry County and Houston County.

== Early life and career ==
A native of Chicago, Rehm came to Alabama in 1990 at the age of 24. He served in the United States Army for four years before taking on a civilian work position at Fort Rucker near Enterprise, Alabama. Rehm was a frontline controller there for 25 years, and served as facility manager from 2014 to 2018.

Rehm's first foray into politics came after Dothan, Alabama, raised its sales tax to four cents on the dollar. Rehm volunteered to go door-to-door campaigning for the unseating of a city councilman involved with the decision, which was eventually successful. Rehm began serving on Houston County's Republican Party executive committee in 2010; he also served one term on the Alabama Republican Party's state-level executive committee.

== Alabama House of Representatives ==
Rehm, who had never considered running for public office, retired in 2022 and took a three-month cross-country RV trip. However, the chairman of the Alabama Republican Party, John Wahl, later recruited Rehm to run as the Republican Party's nominee for election to the Alabama House of Representatives' 85th district. The district previously had no qualified Republican candidates during the primary election, and Wahl was seeking a candidate who fit the party's values. Rehm agreed to run, challenging incumbent Representative Dexter Grimsley, who Rehm claimed was ignoring local issues, especially regarding education. Grimsley was the only Democratic state representative in the Wiregrass Region of Alabama at the time, as well as a 12-year incumbent. Grimsley received no major party opposition in 2022 until Rehm was nominated by the Republican Party in July, after the primary election season had concluded. Rehm accused Grimsley of inaction on parental rights in education and said that Grimsley "never took a stance on any issue". Rehm claimed that "indoctrination" in schools was one of his primary motivations to run for office, including what he alleged was "transgender ideology" in schools. Rehm indicated that he would support anti-transgender bathroom bills in the legislature.

The election in the 85th district was seen as "one of the few competitive races in the state", according to the Alabama Political Reporter, with Rehm citing Grimsley's connections to the Alabama Education Association and Poarch Band of Creek Indians as reasons for the difficulty of the race. Rehm ran a grassroots issues-focused campaign, handing out flyers that lined out his views on political topics. According to Rehm, he started receiving more support from the Alabama Republican Party once the seriousness of his campaign was realized.

In the general election on November 8, 2022, Rehm won by a margin of 54% to Grimsley's 46%, ousting the incumbent Grimsley in an upset victory. 1819 News described Rehm as "virtually unknown" at the time; Rehm criticized local media for not giving airtime to his campaign. He also attributed his victory to his "boots-on-the-ground" campaigning in spite of the lack of media attention. Meanwhile, Grimsley said that Rehm's victory was due to straight-ticket voting. An article from the Alabama Political Reporter analyzed election data from the race and published findings that asserted Rehm won largely because of straight-ticket voting, as well as higher Republican turnout in Alabama. The report also found that Rehm's campaign, which was largely funded by the Alabama Republican Party itself, was significantly outraised and outspent by Grimsley's campaign, yet still won. However, the article also claimed that redistricting did not play a major role in Rehm's victory. Rehm's victory was one of only two seat flips in the Alabama Legislature in the 2022 elections. Rehm took office on November 10, 2022. He told 1819 News that his top priorities as a freshman legislator would be education, defending Second Amendment rights, and repealing Alabama's grocery tax.

As of 2023, Rehm serves on the House committees for Urban and Rural Development, as well as Children and Senior Advocacy.

== Electoral history ==
2022 Alabama House of Representatives, 85th district, general election results
| Party | Candidate | Votes | % |
|---|---|---|---|
| Republican | Rick Rehm | 6,650 | 54.0% |
| Democratic | Dexter Grimsley (incumbent) | 5,644 | 46.0% |
| Total votes | | 12,294 | 100.0% |
| Republican gain from Democratic | | | |
