= Morgan Murphy (food critic) =

American author and press secretary

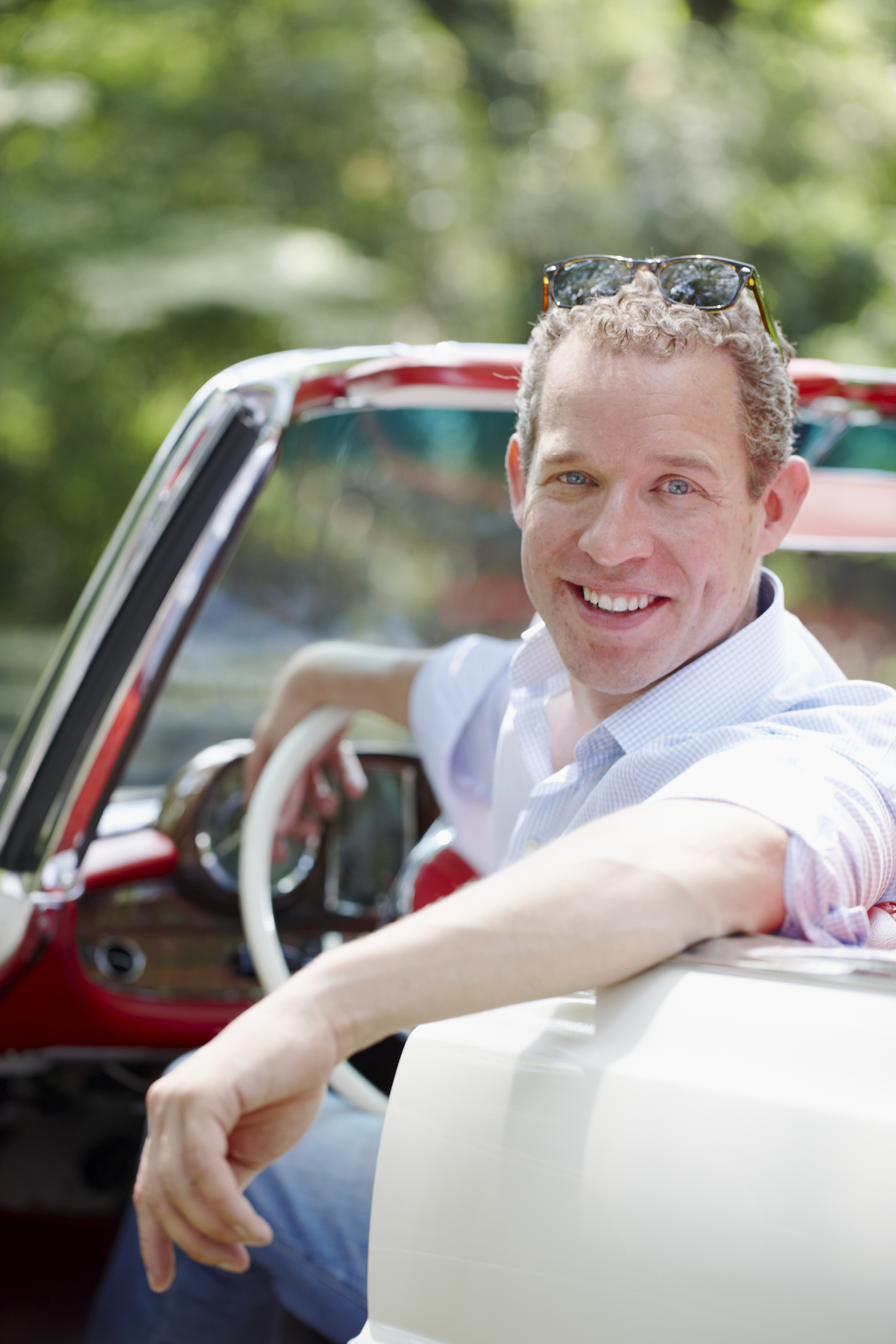
- Murphy in 2012
- Born: Birmingham, Alabama, U.S.
- Political party: Republican
- Culinary career
- Cooking style: American Southern
- Awardss
- Gold Award for Travel, Society of American Travel Writers; American Library Association Humor Book of the Year 2010
- Website: www.morganwwmurphy.com

Morgan Murphy is an American author and United States Navy Reserve captain who served as national security advisor to Senator Tommy Tuberville. He previously worked as a press secretary to the secretary of defense. Murphy was a candidate in the Republican primary for the 2026 United States Senate election in Alabama before withdrawing in early March and endorsing Barry Moore.

== Early life and education ==
Morgan Murphy was born in Mountain Brook, Alabama, and grew up in Birmingham. He received a bachelor's degree in 1994 from Birmingham–Southern College.

He received an MBA from the University of Oxford, where he was a member of Exeter College and was elected by the university as its "MBA of the Year".

== Career ==
=== Journalism ===
Murphy began his career after Rupert Murdoch took note of the student newspaper Murphy edited while at Birmingham–Southern College. The resulting internship at the New York Post led to his first major byline in 1994. In 1996, Murphy joined Vanity Fair after meeting Graydon Carter in an elevator at Condé Nast. From 1998 to 2000, Murphy worked as a reporter for Forbes under Jim Michaels, and regularly covered small business, entertainment, and the automotive sectors. In 2000, he joined Southern Living and served as the magazine's food critic, executive editor, and national spokesman. The magazine’s parent company, Time Inc., later published four of Murphy's five books.

He has appeared on the Travel Channel's American Grilled, The Today Show, Fox & Friends, Fox News, CNN, SiriusXM, Food Talk, Car Talk, NPR, the Speed Channel, and QVC.

=== Military ===
Murphy joined the United States Naval Reserve in 1999, and has since served on five continents. In 2010, he was called to Afghanistan, where he served in Operation Enduring Freedom as the director of Media Outreach for the International Security Assistance Force and briefed General David R. Petraeus, 40 general officers, and two ambassadors on a daily basis. In November 2012, he was assigned to the Chairman of the Joint Chiefs of Staff.

=== Politics ===
In March 2020, Murphy was recalled to Washington to work for Secretary of Defense Mark Esper, serving as his traveling press secretary, moderating town halls with Esper and the chairman of the Joint Chiefs of Staff, and helping the department respond to COVID-19, the BLM riots, and election security. Murphy was promoted to captain by the Secretary of the Navy Kenneth Braithwaite on October 13, 2020. After President Trump fired Mark Esper on November 9, Murphy continued as press secretary to Acting Secretary of Defense Christopher C. Miller until January 20, 2021.

Murphy was the national security adviser to Senator Tommy Tuberville of Alabama. He presented Tuberville with the highly controversial strategy of stalling scores of senior military nominations in an attempt to stop a new Defense Department policy that helps to ensure access to abortions for service members.

== Personal life ==
Birmingham-Southern College which honored him with a Distinguished Alumni Award in 2013. He received his Joint Professional Military Education degree in 2017 from the Naval War College in Newport, Rhode Island.

=== Classic car collection ===
Murphy is a classic car enthusiast with a special focus on vintage Packards and Cadillacs. In 2005, he discovered "The Duchess" – a 1941 Cadillac limousine created for the abdicated king Edward VIII and his consort Wallis Simpson – in a barn in Fort Worth, Texas. The car was a one-of-a-kind creation by General Motors' chief designer Harley Earl, under the direction of the company's chairman and chief executive officer, Alfred P. Sloan. When Murphy purchased the car, it was in disrepair and its provenance was unproven. He conducted a three-year restoration effort, and in November 2013, he offered the car for sale through an RM Auctions and Sotheby's "Art of the Automobile" sale. The auction houses called it "one of the most famous and iconic cars of both American and English society", and suggested the car should sell for between $500,000 and $800,000.

In 2007, Murphy founded Motorpool.com, which was claimed to be the world's first social network for classic car enthusiasts. The launch was backed by more than $1 million in venture capital. In late 2010, Murphy toured the country in a vintage Cadillac to promote the site's launch (and had nine Cadillacs in his possession).

== Military awards and decorations ==
Office of the Secretary of Defense Identification Badge
Office of the Joint Chiefs of Staff Identification Badge
Defense Meritorious Service Medal with one gold award star
Meritorious Service Medal with two gold award stars
Navy and Marine Corps Commendation Medal
Joint Service Achievement Medal
Navy and Marine Corps Achievement Medal with one gold award star
Joint Meritorious Unit Award with one bronze oak leaf cluster
National Defense Service Medal with one bronze service star
Afghanistan Campaign Medal
Global War on Terrorism Service Medal
Armed Forces Service Medal
Military Outstanding Volunteer Service Medal

Navy and Marine Corps Sea Service Ribbon

Naval Reserve Sea Service Ribbon

Navy and Marine Corps Overseas Service Ribbon
Armed Forces Reserve Medal with one silver hourglass device and mobilization device

NATO Medal for Afghanistan

U.S. Navy Expert Rifle Marksmanship Medal with expert device

U.S. Navy Expert Pistol Marksmanship Medal with expert device

== Publications ==
- I Love You – Now Hush (ISBN 978-0895873781) was named the gold humor book of the year by the American Library Association.
- Off the Eaten Path: Favorite Southern Dives and 150 Recipes that Made Them Famous (ISBN 978-0848734459)
- Off the Eaten Path: Second Helpings: Tasty eats and delicious stories from the South's less-traveled trails (ISBN 978-0848739553)
- Bourbon & Bacon: The Ultimate Guide to the South's Favorite Food Groups (ISBN 978-0848743161)
- Off the Eaten Path: On the Road Again: More Unforgettable Foods and Characters from the South's Back Roads and Byways (ISBN 978-0848744441)
