= Mike Dean (politician) =

American politician (born 1955)

Member of the Alabama House of Representatives from the 104th district
- In office 1996–2000
- Succeeded by: Jim Barton

Personal details
- Party: Republican

Mike Dean (born December 26, 1955) is an American politician from Alabama.

Dean attended B. C. Rain High School and played for the American football team as a linebacker. He played college football for William Carey College, but left college without graduating in 1979 to help with the family hauling business after Hurricane Frederic. He founded his own trucking company, Mobile Waste, and sold it to Browning-Ferris Industries after a year.

Dean served the 104th district in the Alabama House of Representatives for two terms. He was then elected to the Mobile County Commission in 2000. Dean was defeated for reelection in 2012 by Jerry Carl.

Dean married Gina, his high school sweetheart.
