= Jim Barton (Alabama politician) =

American politician

Member of the Alabama House of Representatives from the 104th district
- In office 2000 – August 7, 2013
- Preceded by: Mike Dean
- Succeeded by: Margie Wilcox

Personal details
- Born: June 29, 1968 (age 58) Mobile, Alabama
- Party: Republican

Jim Barton (born June 29, 1968) is an American politician who served in the Alabama House of Representatives from the 104th district from 2000 to 2013.
