= Rhett Marques =

American politician

Member of the Alabama House of Representatives from the 91st district
- Incumbent
- Assumed office November 7, 2018
- Preceded by: Barry Moore

Personal details
- Born: Rhett William Marques; December 3, 1972 (age 53) Spanish Fort, Alabama, U.S.
- Party: Republican
- Education: University of Alabama (BS)
- Website: Campaign website

Rhett William Marques (born December 3, 1972) is an American politician and businessman serving as a Republican member of the Alabama House of Representatives from the 91st district. He assumed office on November 7, 2018.

== Early life and education ==
Marques was born in Spanish Fort, a suburb of Mobile. After graduating from Fairhope High School in 1990, he earned a Bachelor of Science degree in marketing from the University of Alabama in 1994.

== Career ==
Marques was the owner of Goodson Tire & Auto in Enterprise, Alabama. He sold the business and became employed to that business, Jim Whaley Tires, Inc. in 2023. He was elected to the Alabama House of Representatives in 2018. Marques is also a member of the House Health Committee. In 2019, Marques voted to increase Alabama's state fuel tax, as part of the Rebuild Alabama Act.
