= Alabama Cannabis Coalition =

Cannabis legalization effort in Alabama

- Founder: H. Marty Schelper
- Purpose: Activism
- Website: alabamacannabiscoalition.org

The Alabama Cannabis Coalition is an American advocacy group promoting the legalization of marijuana in the U.S. state of Alabama.

== Activities ==
The organization has criticized anti-cannabis bills that have been passed in the Alabama Legislature. Marty Schelper, the founder of the organization, releases statements on behalf of it. It criticized the delay in efforts to legalize medical marijuana, after a 2021 law was passed in the state that legalized it.

The organization criticized a 2025 bill that made the possession of any smokable hemp product a class C felony.

The organization also issues endorsements for various political offices. In 2025, they endorsed Randall Woodfin in his re-election bid to a third term.

Upon the beginning of the 2026 state legislative session, the Alabama Cannabis Coalition announced plans to actively pursue and advocate for a repeal of House Bill 445, the 2025 law that restricted hemp. The organization's plans included participation in an Annual Lobby Day event.

== See also ==
- Cannabis in Alabama
