= Muhammad Ali vs. Buster Mathis =

Boxing competition

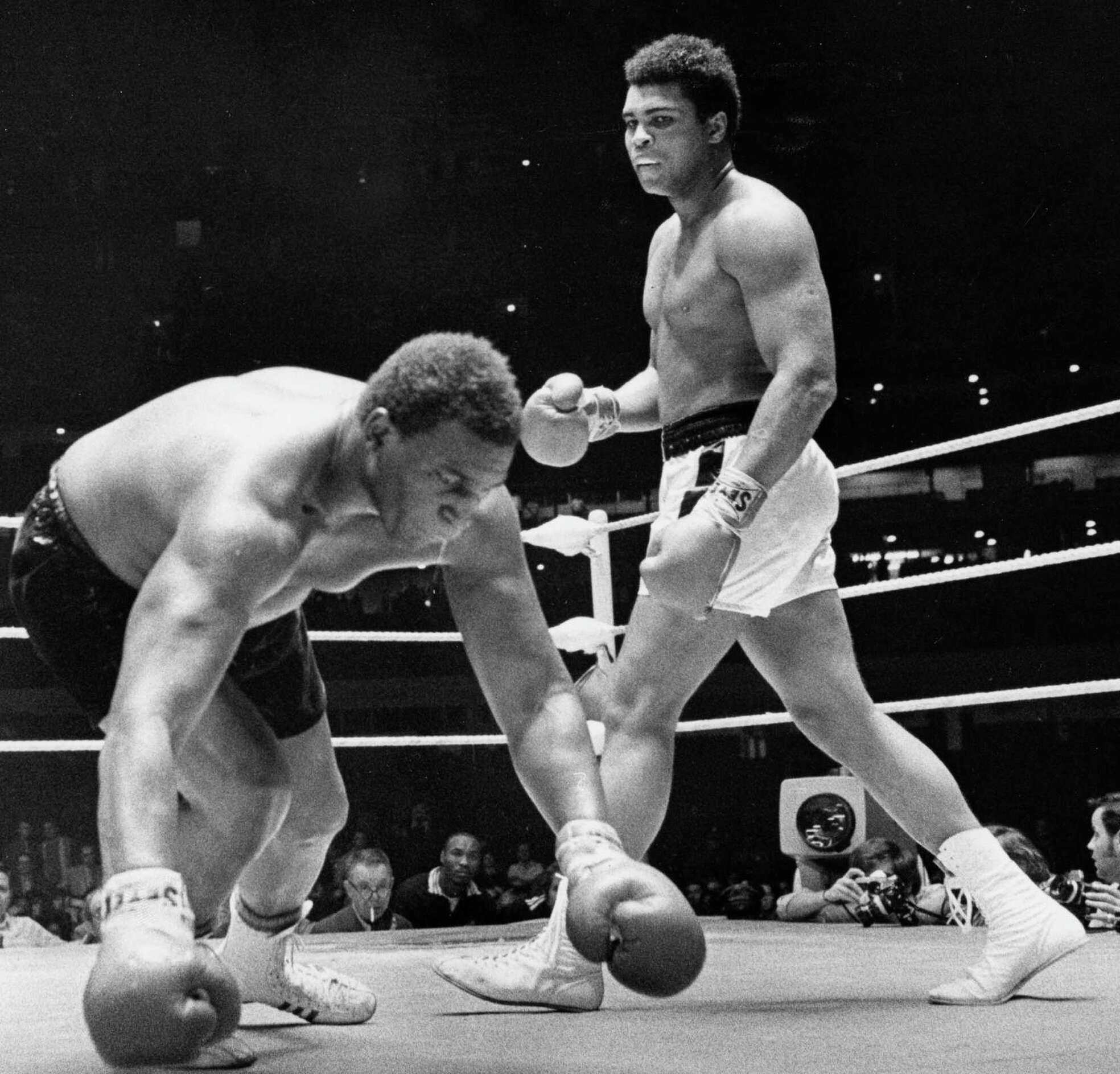
- One of the knockdowns in the 12th round
- Date: November 17, 1971
- Venue: Astrodome, Houston, Texas
- Title(s) on the line: NABF heavyweight title

Tale of the tape
Boxer	(United States) Muhammad Ali	(United States) Buster Mathis
Nickname	"The Greatest"	
Hometown	Louisville, Kentucky	Sledge, Mississippi
Purse	$300,000	
Pre-fight record	32–1 (26 KO)	29–2 (20 KO)
Age	29 years, 10 months	28 years, 5 months
Height	6 ft 3 in (191 cm)	6 ft 3 in (191 cm)
Weight	227 lb (103 kg)	256 lb (116 kg)
Style	Orthodox	Orthodox
Recognition	NABF heavyweight champion Former undisputed heavyweight champion	

Result
- Ali won via 12th round UD

Muhammad Ali vs. Buster Mathis was a professional boxing match contested on November 17, 1971, for the NABF championship.

== Background ==
Ali joked before the fight that "I'm going to do to Buster what the Indians did to Custer". One of the fight posters promoting the match said "Be there when the Mountain comes to Muhammad".

== The fight ==
Ali dominated the fight throughout and won easily on points. Ali knocked Mathis down twice in the eleventh round and twice again in the final round but refused to move in for a knockout out of compassion for Mathis.

== Undercard ==
Confirmed bouts:

== Broadcasting ==
Country	Broadcaster
Philippines	ABS-CBN
United Kingdom	ITV
United States	ABC

Preceded by vs. Jimmy Ellis	Muhammad Ali's bouts 17 November 1971	Succeeded by vs. Jürgen Blin
Preceded by vs. Jerry Quarry	Buster Mathis's bouts 17 November 1971	Succeeded by vs. Humphrey McBride
