= Fight of the Century =

1971 boxing match

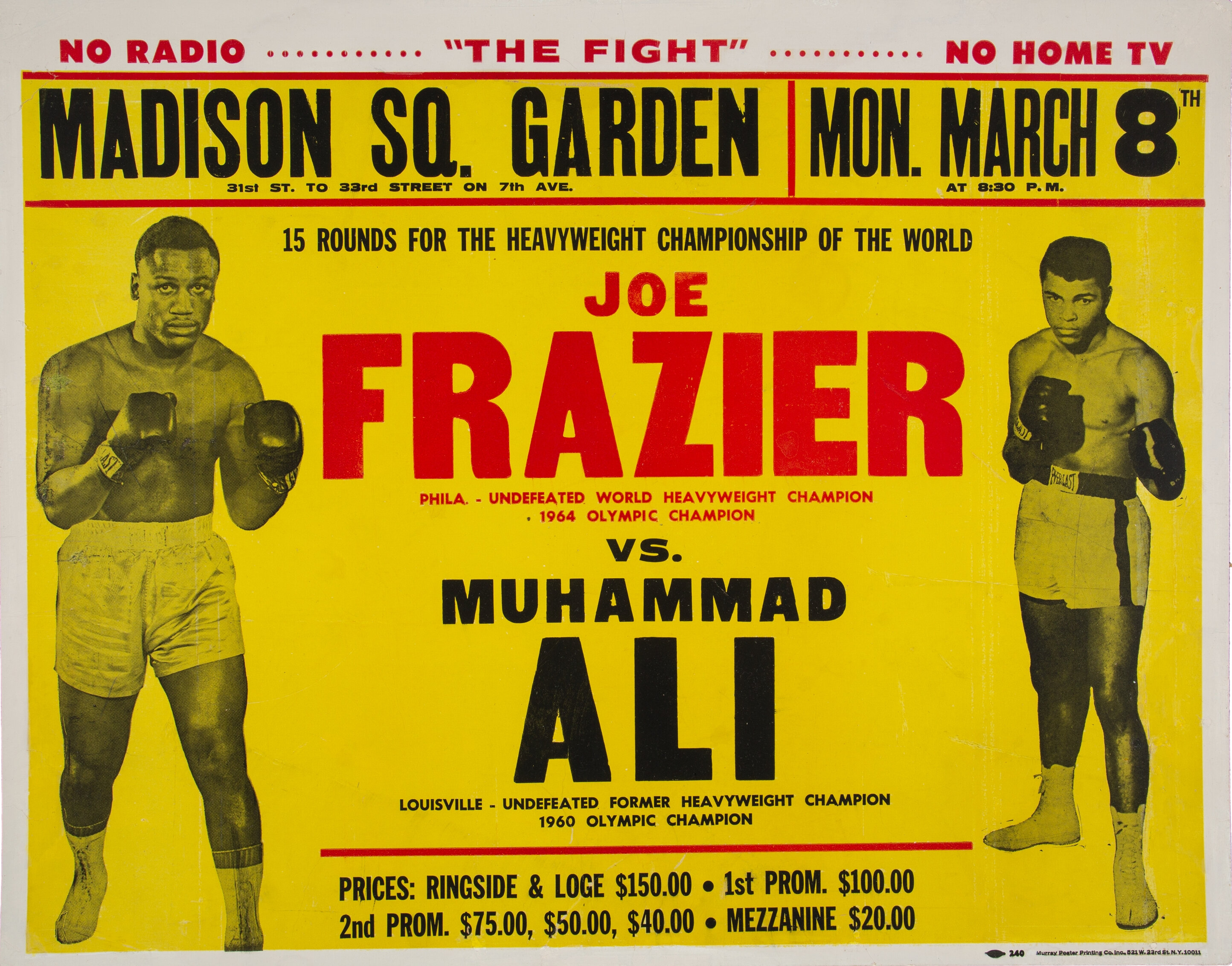
- The onsite poster for defending champion Joe Frazier vs. former champion Muhammad Ali.
- Date: March 8, 1971
- Venue: Madison Square Garden, New York City, US; 40.7504°N 73.9935°W
- Titles on the line: WBA, WBC, The Ring and Lineal undisputed heavyweight titles

Tale of the tape
Boxer	Joe Frazier	Muhammad Ali
Nickname	Smokin'	The Greatest
Hometown	Beaufort, South Carolina, US	Louisville, Kentucky, US
Purse	$2,500,000	$2,500,000
Pre-fight record	26–0 (23 KO)	31–0 (25 KO)
Age	27 years, 1 month	29 years, 1 month
Height	5 ft 11 1/2 in (182 cm)	6 ft 3 in (191 cm)
Weight	205 1/2 lb (93kg)	215 lb (98 kg)
Style	Orthodox	Orthodox
Recognition	WBA, WBC, and The Ring heavyweight champion	Lineal heavyweight champion

Result
- Frazier wins via 15-round unanimous decision (8–6–1, 9–6, 11–4)

Joe Frazier vs. Muhammad Ali, billed as The Fight of the Century or simply The Fight, was a heavyweight championship boxing match between WBA, WBC, and The Ring heavyweight champion Joe Frazier and Lineal champion Muhammad Ali, on Monday, March 8, 1971, at Madison Square Garden in New York City.

The fight is considered the biggest boxing match in history, and arguably the single most anticipated and publicized sporting event of all time. It was the first time ever that two undefeated boxers who held the world heavyweight title fought each other.

The bout held broad appeal for many Americans, including non-boxing and non-sport fans. Ali, who had been stripped of his titles by boxing authorities for refusing to submit to the draft for the Vietnam War, had become a symbol of the anti-establishment public during his government-imposed exile from the ring. In contrast, Frazier supported U.S. involvement in the war, and he had been adopted by elements of the public with alternate views. In addition, both men possessed intense personal animosity towards each other.

Frazier won in fifteen rounds by unanimous decision. Ali dealt with his first professional loss. It became the first of a trio of fights, followed by the rematch events Super Fight II (1974) and the Thrilla in Manila (1975). Both of those fights were won by Ali.

== Background and cultural significance ==
In 1971, both Muhammad Ali and Joe Frazier were undefeated champions (in Ali's case, actually, former champion) who held legitimate claims to the title of "World Heavyweight Champion". Ali had won the title from Sonny Liston in Miami Beach in 1964, and successfully defended his belt up until he had it stripped by boxing authorities for refusing induction into the armed forces in 1967 (though he was still recognized as the Lineal heavyweight champion). In Ali's absence, Frazier won two championship belts, knocking out Buster Mathis for recognition as champion in five states (most notably, New York) and Jimmy Ellis, who had won the World Boxing Association's world title by winning a WBA elimination tournament, to replace Ali as the acknowledged, unified world champion. Frazier was plausibly Ali's equal, which created a tremendous amount of hype and anticipation for a match pitting the two undefeated fighters against one another to decide who was the true heavyweight champ.

Ringside seats were $150 (equivalent to $1,200 in 2025) and each man was guaranteed $2.5 million (equivalent to $19.9 million in 2025). In addition to the millions who watched on closed-circuit broadcast screens around the world, Madison Square Garden was packed with a sell-out crowd of 20,455 that provided a gate of $1.5 million (equivalent to $11.9 million in 2025).

Prior to his enforced layoff, Ali had displayed uncommon speed and agility for a man of his size. He had dominated most of his opponents to the point that he had often predicted the round in which he would knock his opponent out. In October 1970, he stopped Jerry Quarry via cuts after three rounds in his first match after a three-and-a-half-year layoff. However, in his next fight, the last preceding the Frazier fight, Ali struggled at times during his 15th-round TKO of Oscar Bonavena, an unorthodox Argentinian fighter who was prepared by Hall of Fame trainer Gil Clancy. On March 4, 1971, episode of The Dick Cavett Show, Howard Cosell, Joe Louis and Jimmy Breslin all correctly predicted that because of Ali's lengthy layoff, Frazier would prevail.

Frazier had an outstanding left hook and was a tenacious competitor who attacked the body of his opponent ferociously. Despite suffering from a serious bout of hypertension in the lead-up to the fight, he appeared to be in top form as the face-off between the two undefeated champions approached.

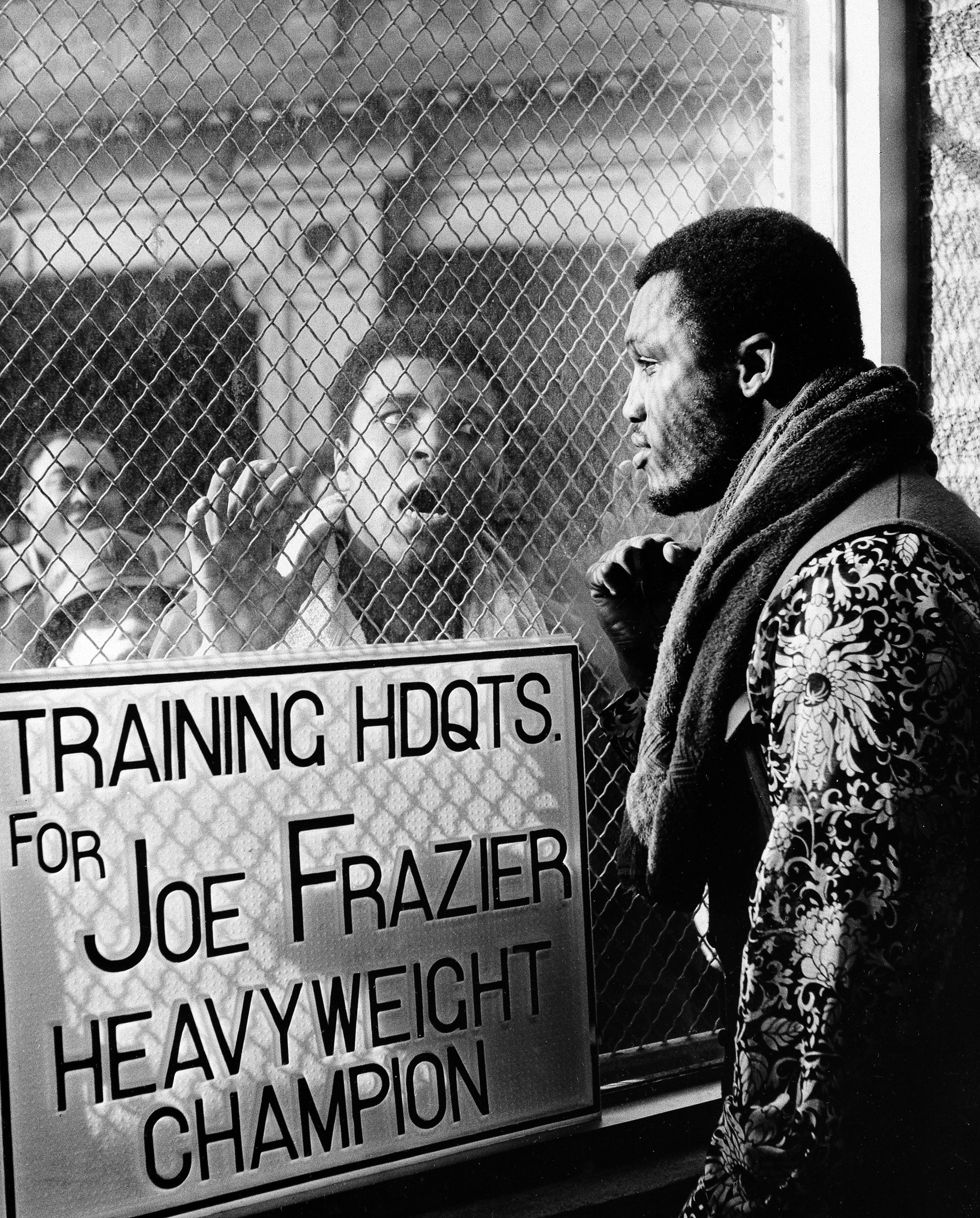
Promotional photo taken in January by George Kalinsky, showing Ali outside Frazier's training headquarters

Prior to the fight, Mark Kram wrote in Sports Illustrated:

The thrust of this fight on the public consciousness is incalculable. It has been a ceaseless whir that seems to have grown in decibel with each new soliloquy by Ali, with each dead calm promise by Frazier. It has magnetized the imagination of ring theorists, and flushed out polemicists of every persuasion. It has cut deep into the thicket of our national attitudes, and it is a conversational imperative everywhere—from the gabble of big-city salons and factory lunch breaks rife with unreasoning labels, to ghetto saloons with their own false labels.

As Gil Clancy, who was in Frazier's corner that night, would later comment:

The electricity in the air then was just unbelievable. If they would have dropped the bomb on Madison Square Garden that night, the country wouldn't have been able to run.

== Fight ==
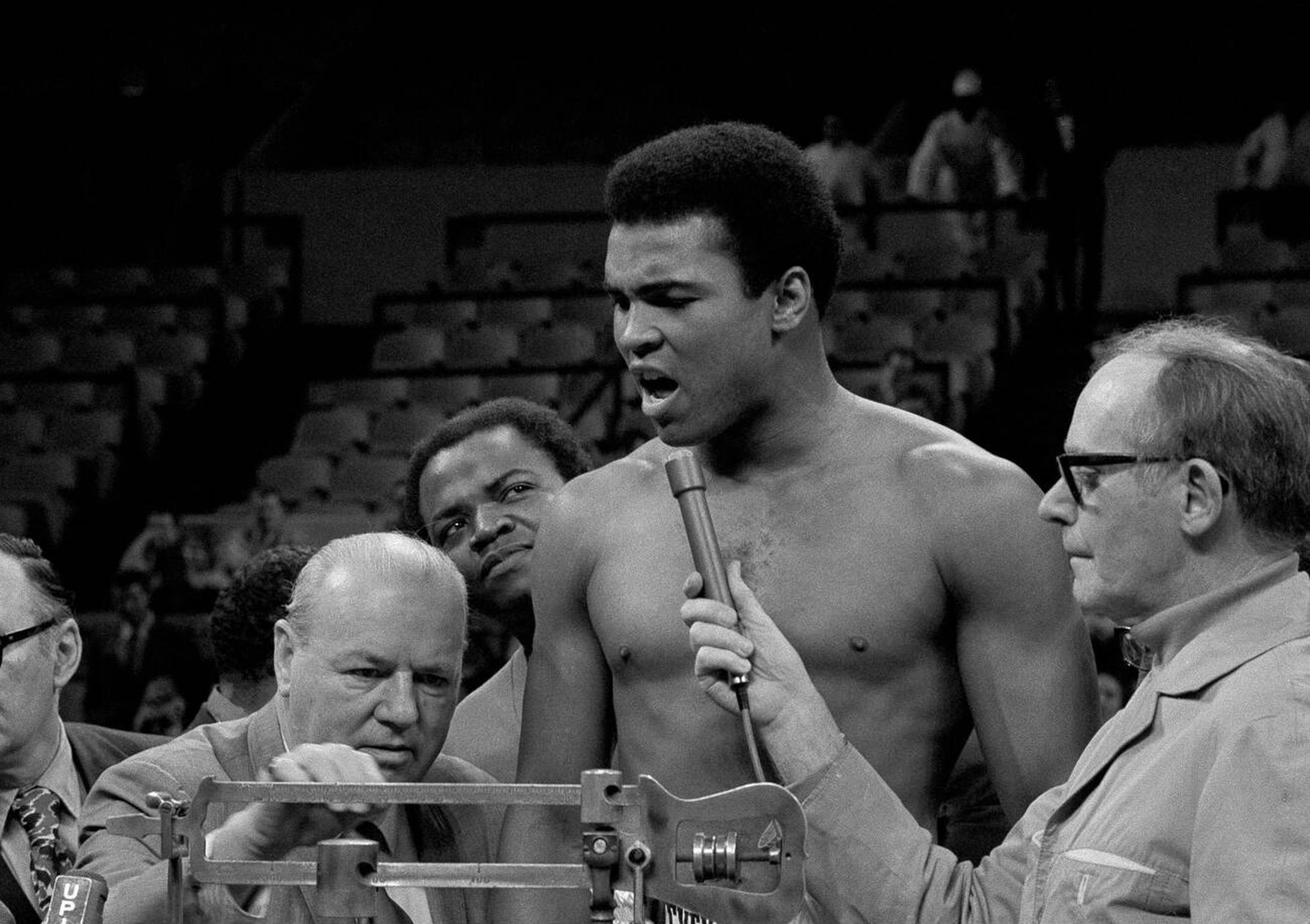
Ali at the weigh-in for the match

On the evening of the match, Madison Square Garden had a circus-like atmosphere, with scores of policemen to control the crowd of outrageously dressed fans, kids, and countless celebrities, from Norman Mailer to Woody Allen. Unable to procure a ringside seat, Frank Sinatra took photographs for Life magazine instead. Nelson Mandela, who was in prison in South Africa during the event, spoke about how excited everybody was about this fight. Artist LeRoy Neiman painted Ali and Frazier as they fought. Burt Lancaster served as a color commentator for the closed-circuit broadcast. Though Lancaster had never performed as a sports commentator before, he was hired by the fight's promoter, Jerry Perenchio, who was also a friend. Perenchio enlisted sports owner Jack Kent Cooke as financial backer of the fight with a bank guarantee of $4,000,000 which provided the bulk of the fighters' $5,000,000 fee. The other commentators were famed boxing play-by-play announcer Don Dunphy and former light-heavyweight boxing champion and heavyweight competitor Archie Moore. The fight was sold, and broadcast by closed circuit, to 50 countries in 12 languages via ringside reporters to an audience estimated at 300 million, a record viewership for a television event at that time. Riots broke out at several venues as unresolvable technical issues interrupted the broadcast in several cities in the third round. And, although no live radio coverage of the fight itself was allowed under the terms of the promotion, the Mutual Radio Network did broadcast the fight the night of March 8, with announcers Van Patrick and Charles King, together with many other sports commentators, providing round-by-round summaries live as they came out over the UPI and AP wire services. The referee for the fight was Arthur Mercante Sr. After the fight, Mercante, a veteran referee of hundreds of fights, said: "They both threw some of the best punches I've ever seen."

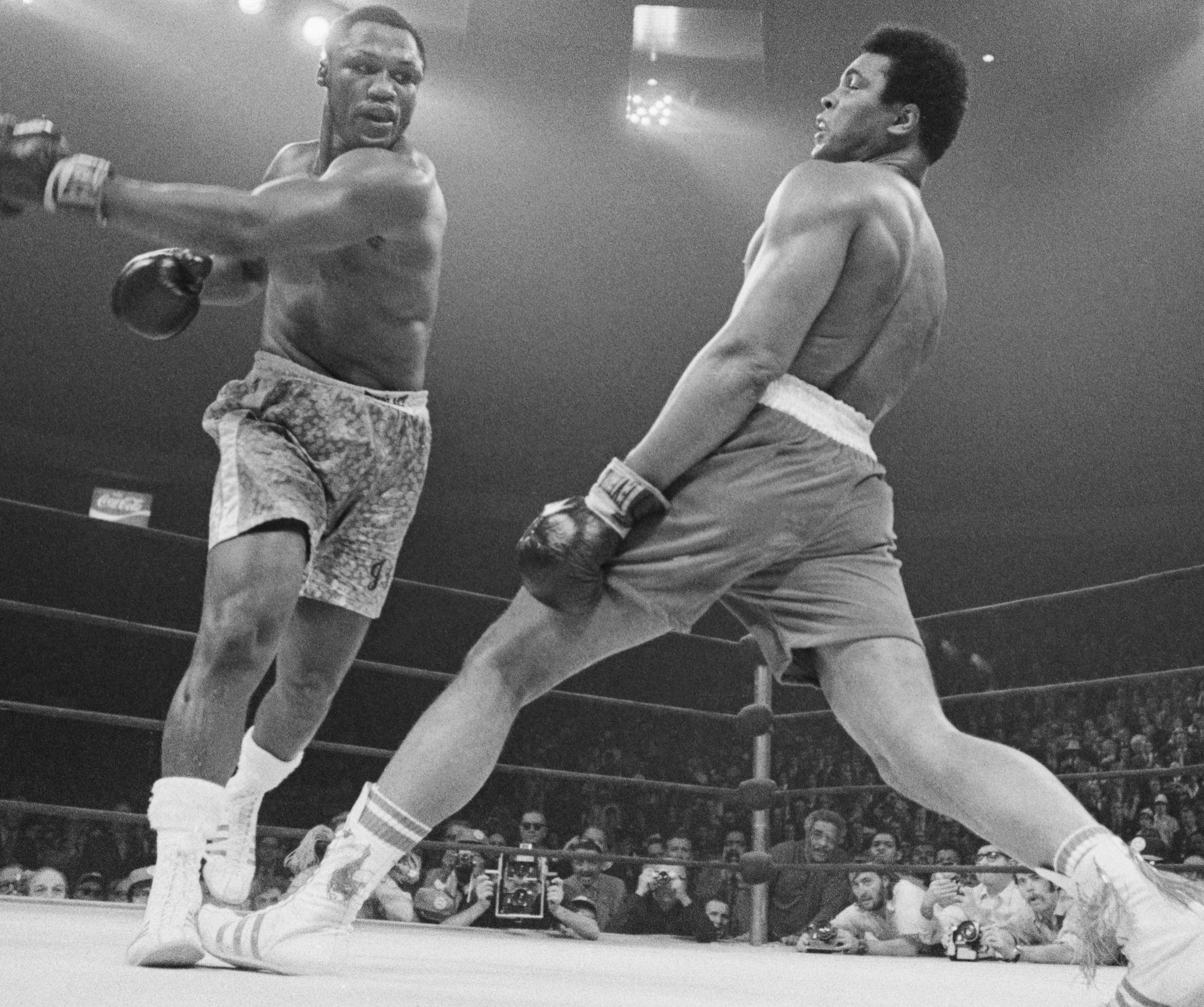
Ali avoiding a punch from Frazier

The fight itself exceeded many fans’ expectations and went the full 15-round championship distance. Ali dominated the first five rounds, peppering the shorter Frazier with rapier-like jabs that raised welts on the champion's face.

Ali was visibly tired after the sixth round, and though he put together some flurries of punches after that round, he was unable to keep the pace he had set in the first third of the fight. At 1 minute and 59 seconds into round eight, following his clean left hook to Ali's right jaw, Frazier grabbed Ali's wrists and swung Ali into the center of the ring; however, Ali immediately grabbed Frazier again until they were once again separated by Mercante.

At 2:10 of the eleventh round, Frazier staggered Ali with a left hook, Ali's knees buckling—only bouncing off the ropes keeping Ali from again hitting the canvas. For the remainder of the round, Ali stumbled around the ring backing again and again into the ropes and grabbing at Frazier as Frazier continued battering him until the fighters were separated by Mercante at 2:55 into the round.

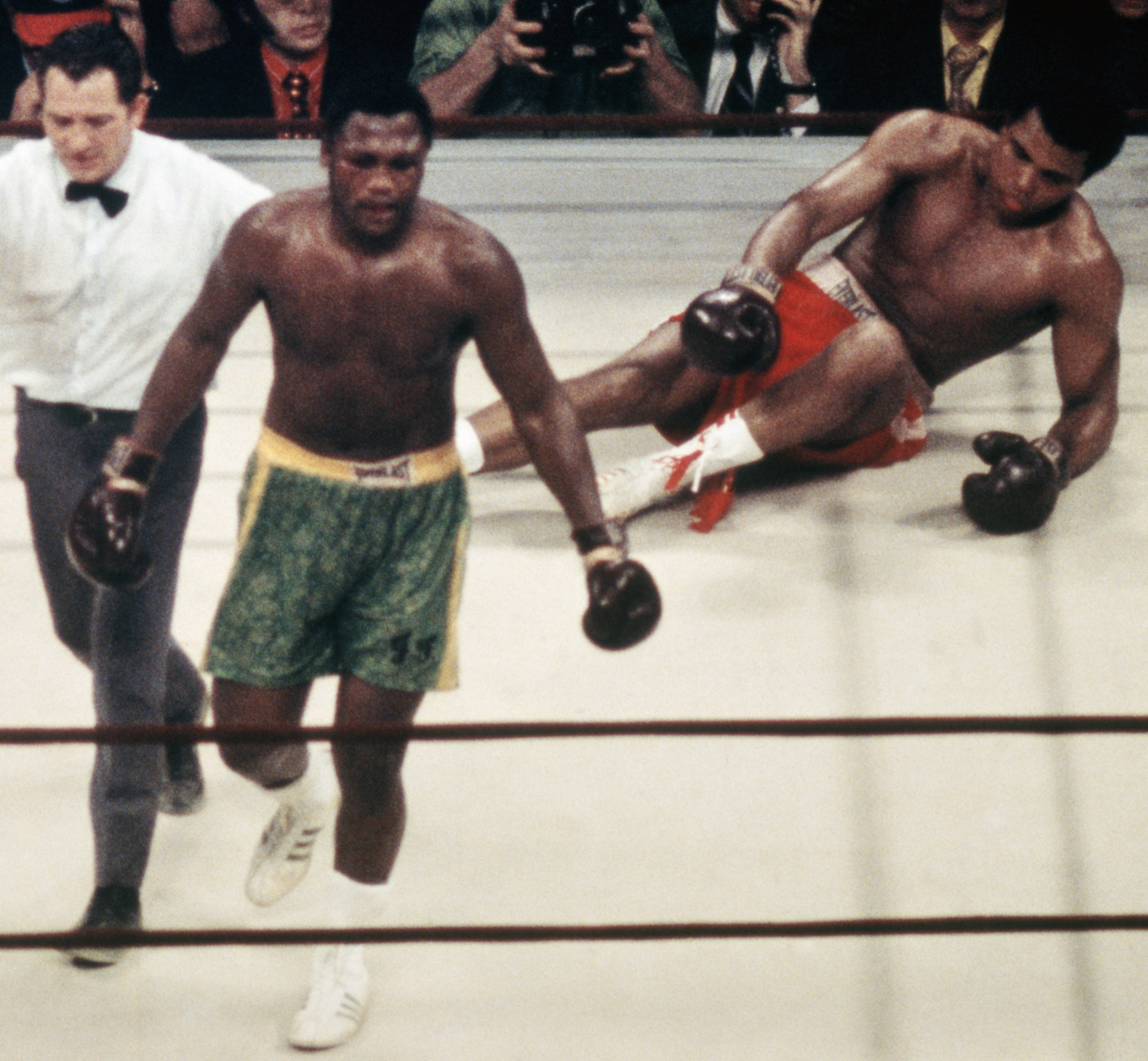
Ali on the ground

Heading into round 15, all three judges had Frazier in the lead (7–6–1, 10–4, and 8–6), and Frazier closed convincingly. Early in the round, Frazier landed a left hook that put Ali on the canvas. Ali, his jaw swollen noticeably, got up at the count of four and managed to stay on his feet for the rest of the round despite several terrific blows from Frazier. A few minutes later, the judges made it official: Frazier had retained the title with a unanimous decision, dealing Ali his first professional loss.

=== Scorecard ===
Round	1	2	3	4	5	6	7	8	9	10	11	12	13	14	15	Total
Artie Aidala (judge)	A	A	F	F	F	F	F	A	A	F	F	F	A	A	F	Frazier, 9–6
Bill Recht (judge)	F	A	F	F	A	F	F	F	A	F	F	F	F	A	F	Frazier, 11–4
Art Mercante (referee)	A	A	F	F	F	A	A	F	A	A	F	–	F	F	F	Frazier, 8–6–1

== Viewership and revenue ==
The fight was broadcast live pay-per-view on theatre television in the United States, where it set a record with 2.5 million tickets sold at closed-circuit venues, grossing $45 million. It was also shown closed-circuit during the middle of the night in London theatres, where it set a record with 90,000 tickets, grossing $750,000. Combined, the fight sold 2.59 million tickets in the United States and London, grossing $45.75 million (inflation-adjusted $400 million).

On both closed-circuit and free television, the fight was watched by a record 300 million viewers worldwide. It was watched by a record 27.5 million viewers on BBC1 in the United Kingdom, about half of the British population. It was also watched by an estimated 5.4 million viewers in Italy, and 2 million viewers in South Korea.

== Aftermath ==
Ali refused to publicly admit defeat and sought to define the outcome in the public's mind as a "White Man's Decision". Frazier lost the title 22 months later, when he was knocked down six times in the first two rounds by George Foreman in their brief but devastating January 22, 1973, title bout in Kingston, Jamaica.

Ali split two bouts with Ken Norton in 1973 and was viewed by many as on a downward slide before a win in a rematch—Ali–Frazier II—in January 1974. That October, Ali shocked the world with a victory in Kinshasa, Zaire, over the heavily favored Foreman to regain the heavyweight title in The Rumble in the Jungle.

Ali later went on to defeat Frazier in their third and final bout, The Thrilla in Manila, in 1975. By the time of the rematches the social climate in America had settled down, with the Vietnam War having ended in early 1973. Many dismissed the notion that Ali was a traitor, and he was once again accepted as the heavyweight champion. People who had supported Frazier on political and racial grounds in the first bout so that they could see Ali get beat were less effusive and abandoned him after he lost his championship. Without the same social divide, with the unknown of whether Ali could ever regain enough of his former greatness to dominate post-layoff partially answered, and without the impetus of two unbeaten champions meeting one another for the first time, neither their second nor their third matchup would attain the unprecedented hype of the first.

In 2026, an audio recording of the fight was selected by the Library of Congress for preservation in the National Recording Registry for its "cultural, historical or aesthetic importance in the nation's recorded sound heritage."

== COINTELPRO ==
The fight provided cover for an activist group, the Citizens' Commission to Investigate the FBI, to successfully pull off a burglary at an FBI office in Pennsylvania, which exposed the COINTELPRO operations that included illegal spying on activists involved with the civil rights and anti-war movements, on the basis that guards listening to radio coverage of the fight would be distracted from their duties. One of the COINTELPRO targets was Muhammad Ali, and the FBI's goals included their gaining access to his records as far back as elementary school.

== See also ==
- Boxing career of Muhammad Ali
- Jack Johnson vs. James J. Jeffries

Preceded by vs. Bob Foster	Joe Frazier's bouts March 8, 1971	Succeeded by vs. Terry Daniels
Preceded by vs. Oscar Bonavena	Muhammad Ali's bouts March 8, 1971	Succeeded by vs. Jimmy Ellis
Awards
Preceded by Carlos Monzón vs. Nino Benvenuti	The Ring Fight of the Year; 1971	Succeeded by Bob Foster vs. Chris Finnegan
Preceded by Muhammad Ali vs. Oscar Bonavena; Round 15	The Ring Round of the Year; Round 15; 1971	Succeeded by Muhammad Ali vs. Bob Foster; Round 5
