= Muhammad Ali vs. Oscar Bonavena =

Boxing competition

- Date: December 7, 1970
- Venue: Madison Square Garden, New York City, New York, US
- Title(s) on the line: Vacant NABF/Lineal heavyweight title

Tale of the tape
Boxer	(United States) Muhammad Ali	(Argentina) Oscar Bonavena
Nickname	"The Greatest"	"Ringo"
Hometown	Louisville, Kentucky, US	Buenos Aires, Argentina
Purse	$200,000	$100,000
Pre-fight record	30–0 (24 KO)	46–6–1 (37 KO)
Age	28 years, 10 months	28 years, 2 months
Height	6 ft 3 in (191 cm)	5 ft 10 1/2 in (179 cm)
Weight	212 lb (96 kg)	204 lb (93 kg)
Style	Orthodox	Orthodox
Recognition	Lineal; Heavyweight Champion	WBA; No. 1 Ranked Heavyweight

Result
- Ali won via 15th round TKO

Muhammad Ali vs. Oscar Bonavena was a professional boxing match contested on December 7, 1970, for the NABF and Lineal heavyweight championship at Madison Square Garden in New York City on December 7, 1970.

== Background ==
Many experts believed Ali was making a mistake by fighting with Bonavena in only his second fight after his 3½ year break from professional boxing. Christened "The Bull" by the press, Bonavena was a hard puncher; he was the only boxer at this time who had gone the full distance with Joe Frazier in two hard fought fights, knocking down Frazier twice in the first bout, and forcing Frazier on the defensive in the final rounds of the second bout. Thirty-seven of Bonavena's previous forty-five boxing opponents had been knocked out.

At the weigh-in, it was Bonavena who took the initiative of indulging in psychological warfare. In broken English, Bonavena shouted to Ali: "You cheekeen...You no go in Army." Continuing with the verbal tirade, Bonavena went on to call Ali a "black kangaroo", indicated that Ali had hygiene problems, and, using an old Sonny Liston line, accused Ali of being a homosexual. Ali was left to making gestures indicating Bonavena was crazy. After the weigh-in, however, Ali began his own psychological attack by turning up unannounced in Bonavena's dressing room and shouting hysterically at his opponent until he was ejected by Bonavena's entourage from the room. On the day of the fight Ali announced:

I've never wanted to whup a man so bad. I'm gonna put some soul on his head. I tell you that the Beast is mine. And tonight he falls in nine."

== The fight ==
=== Rounds 1–3 ===
For the first three rounds it was a vintage Ali repelling the brave but crude Bonavena. José Torres, who witnessed the bout, wrote that in the first round of the fight Ali looked like a bullfighter and Bonavena like a bull. Torres went on to write:

Now it is the third round and Ali begins to do exactly as he did in the previous two rounds. He moves and flicks left jabs. Oscar also does exactly as he did in rounds one and two, he charges, sometimes with control, most times with anger. One thing he does which I think many of us so-called smart fighters never do: he misses and keeps trying. He misses some more and keeps trying. He doesn't get frustrated.

=== Rounds 4–8 ===
In the middle of round 4, Ali began to tire and retreated to the ropes; Bonavena now had a stationary target to hit. From rounds 4 through 8 of the fight, Ali continued defensive boxing with Bonavena stalking him relentlessly. Leaning back against the ropes, Ali started depending on his reflexes rather than his feet to avoid Bonavena's punches. However, the body shots Bonavena was throwing at Ali started connecting with some regularity. The fight became insipid with Bonavena pursuing Ali, but lacking the requisite technique to end the bout.

=== Round 9 ===
Prior to the match, Ali had predicted that round 9 would be the final round of this bout. As it turned out, both fighters kept punching each other throughout this round. The round began with Ali landing a strong punch on Bonavena's jaw, but as Ali moved in purposefully, the bout became a slugging contest with Bonavena hitting back. In the melee, Bonavena's hook found Ali's jaw, and Ali was hurt. Reflecting on this moment in the fight, Ali later observed:

Funny, when i was predictin' the ninth round, I never thought I came close to predictin' on myself. I made a lot of mistakes in that fight, and it cost me. I got careless with him in the ninth round, and you can't do that with Oscar. In that ninth round I got hit by a hook harder than Frazier could ever throw. Numb! Like I was numb all over. Shock and vibrations is all I felt, that's how I knew I was alive. I mean, I was jarred. Even my toes felt the vibrations. The first thought that came to mind—another good one or two might have dropped me. So the minute I'm hit—two steps backwards and I'm on the other side of the ring."

=== Rounds 10–14 ===
After the fiercely contested ninth round, the fight degenerated into an insipid affair with Ali engaging in defensive boxing. As Torres wrote:

In the ring there is no action. People boo Ali. He's causing the dullness of the fight. He is also preventing Oscar from connecting solid blows ... Round eleven finds Ali leaning against the ropes. Oscar is throwing awkward punches to Ali's body ... It goes on like that. The thirteenth is like the twelfth and the fourteenth like the thirteenth.

=== Round 15 ===
In the final round of the bout, Bonavena, realizing that he needed a knockout to win the match, started throwing a barrage of punches at Ali. As Bonavena was preparing to throw a right at Ali, he was suddenly beaten to the punch by Ali's left hook and knocked down. Bonavena got up and was knocked down again; he got up a third time and was again knocked down by Ali after which the fight was stopped. Bonavena's trainer Gil Clancy remembered:

[B]y the fifteenth round, believe me, they were like two Golden Gloves kids. Whoever hit who, the other guy was gonna go. That's when Ali threw a left hook. His head was looking up toward the balcony somewhere, and he threw a left hook, hit Bonavena on the chin, and knocked him down. Bonavena got up, but he was out on his feet. Ali knocked him down three times that round, but after the first knockdown it was academic.

Ali would win the bout, his first at the current Madison Square Garden, through a technical knockout before the end of 15th round.

== Aftermath ==
After the fight, Ali grabbed a microphone and shouted:

I have done what Joe Frazier couldn't do--knocked out Oscar Bonavena. Now where is he? I want Joe Frazier.

Ali's next boxing match was with Joe Frazier. Bonavena later died under tragic circumstances in 1976.

According to Ferdie Pacheco, Ali absorbed more punishment in this particular fight than in any of his previous fights, and it was a mistake for Ali to have fought with Bonavena just before his first fight with Joe Frazier.

== Undercard ==
Confirmed bouts: Ken Buchanan defeated Donato Paduano in a 10-round unanimous decision.

Preceded by vs. Jerry Quarry	Muhammad Ali's bouts 7 December 1970	Succeeded by vs. Joe Frazier
Preceded by vs. Luis Pires	Oscar Bonavena's bouts 7 December 1970	Succeeded by vs. Alvin Lewis
Awards
Preceded by Nino Benvenuti vs. Luis Manuel Rodríguez; Round 11	The Ring Round of the Year; Round 15; 1970	Succeeded by Joe Frazier vs. Muhammad Ali; Round 15
