= Little Hatch =

American musician (1921–2003)

- Born: Provine Hatch Jr. October 25, 1921; Sledge, Mississippi, United States
- Died: January 14, 2003 (aged 81) El Dorado Springs, Missouri, United States
- Genres: Electric blues
- Occupations: Harmonicist, singer, musician
- Instrument: Harmonica

Little Hatch (October 25, 1921 – January 14, 2003) was an American electric blues singer, musician, and harmonica player. He variously worked with George Jackson and John Paul Drum.

== Biography ==
Hatch was born Provine Hatch Jr., in Sledge, Mississippi, United States. He learned to play the harmonica from his father. Hearing blues and gospel music, Hatch knew he wanted to make music for a living. When he was 14 years old, his family moved to Helena, Arkansas, and the blues scene there caught his attention.

Hatch joined the Navy in 1943. After his tour of duty, he relocated to Kansas City, Missouri, in 1946. He worked for a cartage company for two years and then founded his own cartage business and married.

In the early 1950s, Hatch began jamming in blues clubs in Kansas City. He closed his business in 1954 and took a job with Hallmark Cards. In 1955, he formed and fronted his own band, playing on the weekends and a few nights a week. This group continued to perform for more than 20 years. By the late 1950s, Hatch's harmonica style became influenced by Chicago blues players such as Little Walter, Snooky Pryor and Junior Wells.

A performance by Hatch was recorded by German exchange students in 1971, and these recordings were released on the album The Little Hatchet Band, but its distribution was limited to Germany and Belgium.

Hatch retired from Hallmark in 1986. His band, Little Hatch and the House Rockers, was hired as the house band of the Grand Emporium Saloon in Kansas City. A cassette tape of his blues performances at the Grand Emporium was released in 1988. Little Hatch and the House Rockers performed a Friday evening matinee from 6-8pm starting in 1987, with bass player Joe Wittfeld, drummer Dennis Spears, and guitarist Kirk Brown. Various members of the band circulated with personnel changes including Memphis Mike McDaniel on guitar, Woody Davis on drums, Bill Dye on guitar, and Jaisson Taylor on drums. The album Well, All Right! was recorded on May 31, 1992, at the Grand Emporium venue in Kansas City, Missouri. The personnel on that recording was: Little Hatch, Bill Dye, guitar, Joe Wittfeld, bass, and Jaisson Taylor on drums. The subsequent release was in 1993, and the band played in Belgium at the Handazame Blues Festival in 1994. The Little Hatch and the House Rockers band played the Kansas City, Missouri Spirit Festival that same year. Hatch's band played at the first KC Spirit Festival, in 1986, with the lineup of Kirk Brown, guitar, Dennis Spears, drums, and Joe Wittfeld, bass. The band played virtually every KC Spirit Festival from 1986, until Hatch died. The band also played the Kansas City Kansas Street Festival where, Little Hatch was awarded the title of a "King" during the festival. Congressman Emmanuel Cleaver established a "Little Hatch Day", during his tenure as Kansas City, Missouri's Mayor. Little Hatch's band also played the Garden City, Kansas Blues Festival, with "Memphis Mike" McDaniel, guitar, Howard Bradley, drums and Joe Wittfeld, bass. Except for a couple years between 1988 and 1990, Hatch's sole regular bass player was Joe Wittfeld. A few personnel who filled in for him, were Adam Page, Bryan Hicks, and Paul Hartfield (who was Hatch's bassman from 1988 to 1990, when the job was passed back to Wittfeld).

In 1993, the Modern Blues label released Well, All Right!, his first nationally distributed album. In 1997, Chad Kassem opened Blue Heaven Studios and founded the APO label. Kassem had befriended Hatch in the mid-1980s and asked him to be his first signed recording artist. The album Goin' Back was released in 2000, followed by Rock with Me Baby in 2003.

From 1999 to 2001, Hatch occasionally toured other parts of the United States and twice toured Europe. He settled in Kansas City and performed locally, frequently playing at BB's Lawnside Bar-B-Q and other venues.

Hatch died in El Dorado Springs, Missouri, in January 2003. Some of the pallbearers at Hatch's funeral were Joe Wittfeld, Bill Dye, and Jaisson Taylor.

== Discography ==
- The Little Hatchet Band (1971)
- Well, All Right! (Modern Blues Recordings, 1993)
- Goin' Back (APO, 2000)
- Rock with Me Baby (APO, 2003)
