= Mack Pride =

American baseball player (1932–2018)

- Pitcher
- Born: May 27, 1932; Sledge, Mississippi
- Died: September 23, 2018 (aged 86); Wheat Ridge, Colorado
- Batted: Right Threw: Right

Teams
- Memphis Red Sox (1955); Kansas City Monarchs (1956)

Mack A. Pride Jr. (May 27, 1932 – September 23, 2018) was a professional baseball pitcher who played in Negro league baseball. He batted and threw right-handed.

Born in Sledge, Mississippi, Pride was one of eleven children of poor sharecroppers. A music lover, one of his dreams was to become a professional baseball player. His younger brother, Charley Pride, pitched in Negro league baseball before becoming a country music singer.

Pride spent two seasons in the Negro American League pitching with the Memphis Red Sox in the 1955 season and for the Kansas City Monarchs in 1956. He picked up the nickname "Mack the Knife" during this time.

Afterward, Pride was a Christian minister in religious broadcasting while also singing at weddings, night clubs and funerals. He held various other jobs for more than 40 years and coached Little League Baseball in his spare time.

In 2008, Major League Baseball staged a special draft of the surviving Negro League players, a tribute to those who were kept out of the big leagues because of their race. MLB clubs each drafted a former NLB player; Mack was selected by the Colorado Rockies and Charley by the Texas Rangers.
