= Muhammad Ali vs. Jimmy Ellis =

Boxing competition

The Inevitable Fight
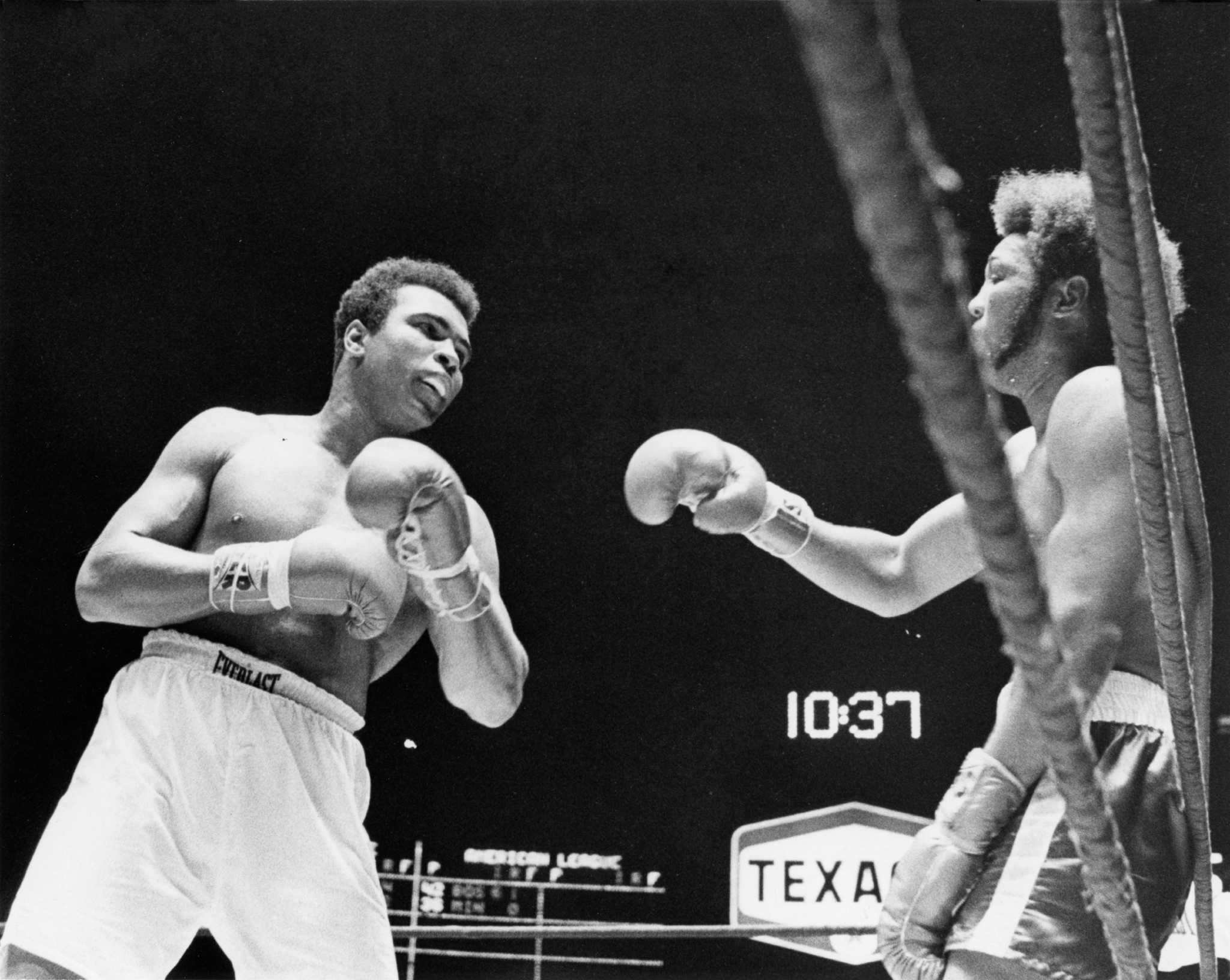
- Ellis against the ropes in the 12th round
- Date: July 26, 1971
- Venue: Astrodome, Houston, Texas
- Title(s) on the line: NABF heavyweight title

Tale of the tape
Boxer	(United States) Muhammad Ali	(United States) Jimmy Ellis
Nickname	"The Greatest"	
Hometown	Louisville, Kentucky	Louisville, Kentucky
Purse	$450,000	
Pre-fight record	31–1 (25 KO)	30–6 (14 KO)
Age	29 years, 6 months	31 years, 5 months
Height	6 ft 3 in (191 cm)	6 ft 0 in (183 cm)
Weight	220 1/2 lb (100 kg)	189 lb (86 kg)
Style	Orthodox	Orthodox
Recognition	Former undisputed heavyweight champion	Former WBA heavyweight champion

Result
- Ali won via 12th round TKO (2:10)

Muhammad Ali vs. Jimmy Ellis, billed as The Inevitable Fight, was a professional boxing match contested on July 26, 1971, for the NABF heavyweight championship.

== Background ==
This was Ali's first boxing match after the Fight of the Century against Joe Frazier in March 1971.

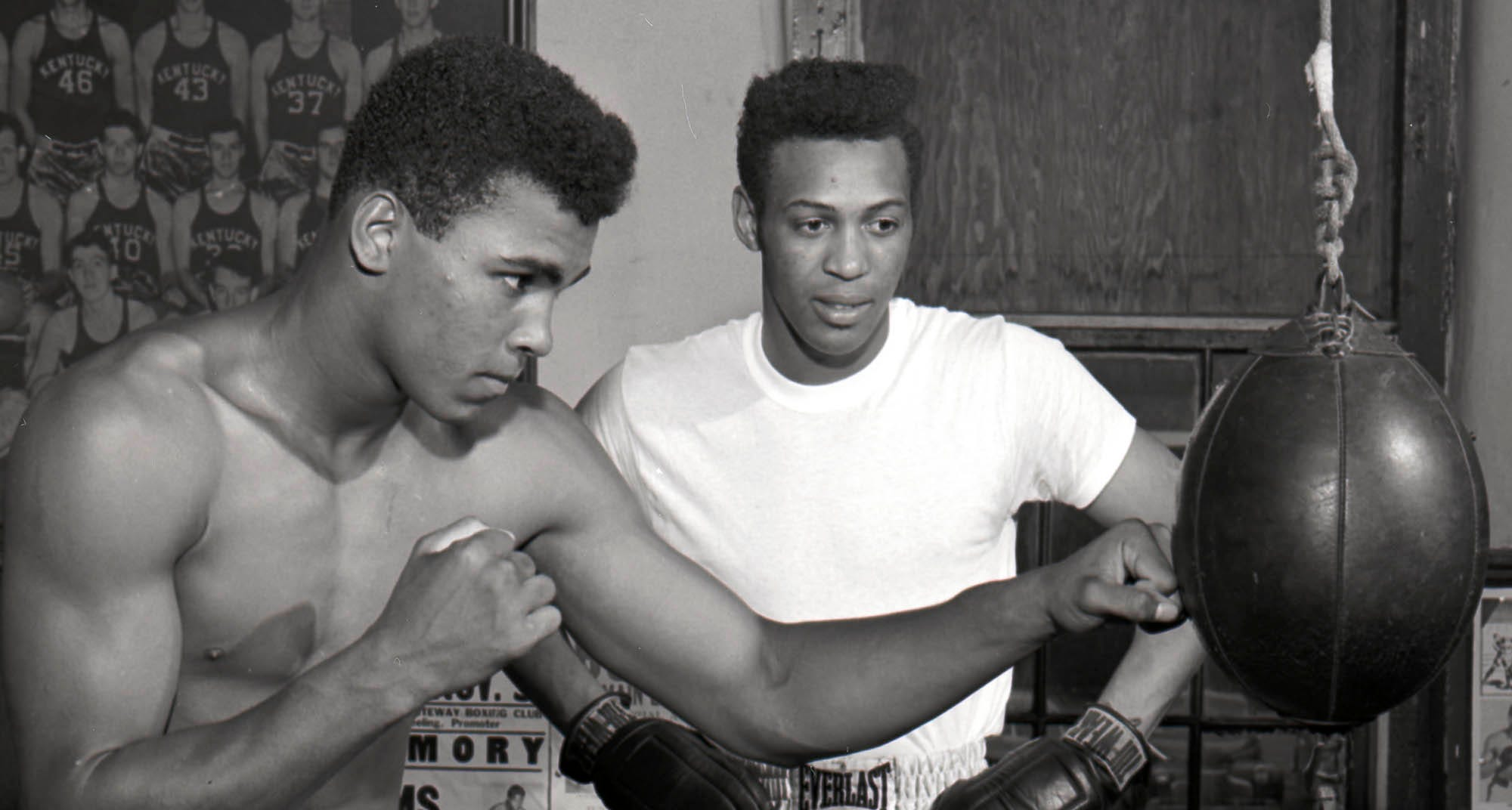
Ali and Ellis training together in 1961

A problem arose before the fight as both Ali and Ellis shared the same trainer, Angelo Dundee. Dundee had been Ali's trainer since his second professional fight, and was also Ellis' manager. It would be decided that Dundee would be in Ellis' corner, with Dundee stating "You gotta understand — I manage Ellis 100 per cent. With Ali, I'm just an employee.". However, Ali claimed that Dundee chose Ellis because he would make more money from managing him than training Ali. Ali got Harry Wiley as his trainer, who had helped train and manage Sugar Ray Robinson. Also of note is that Ali's assistant trainer, Drew Bundini Brown, had forgotten to pack Ali's trunks, as such, Ali would wear a pair of over-sized white trunks for the bout.

== The fight ==
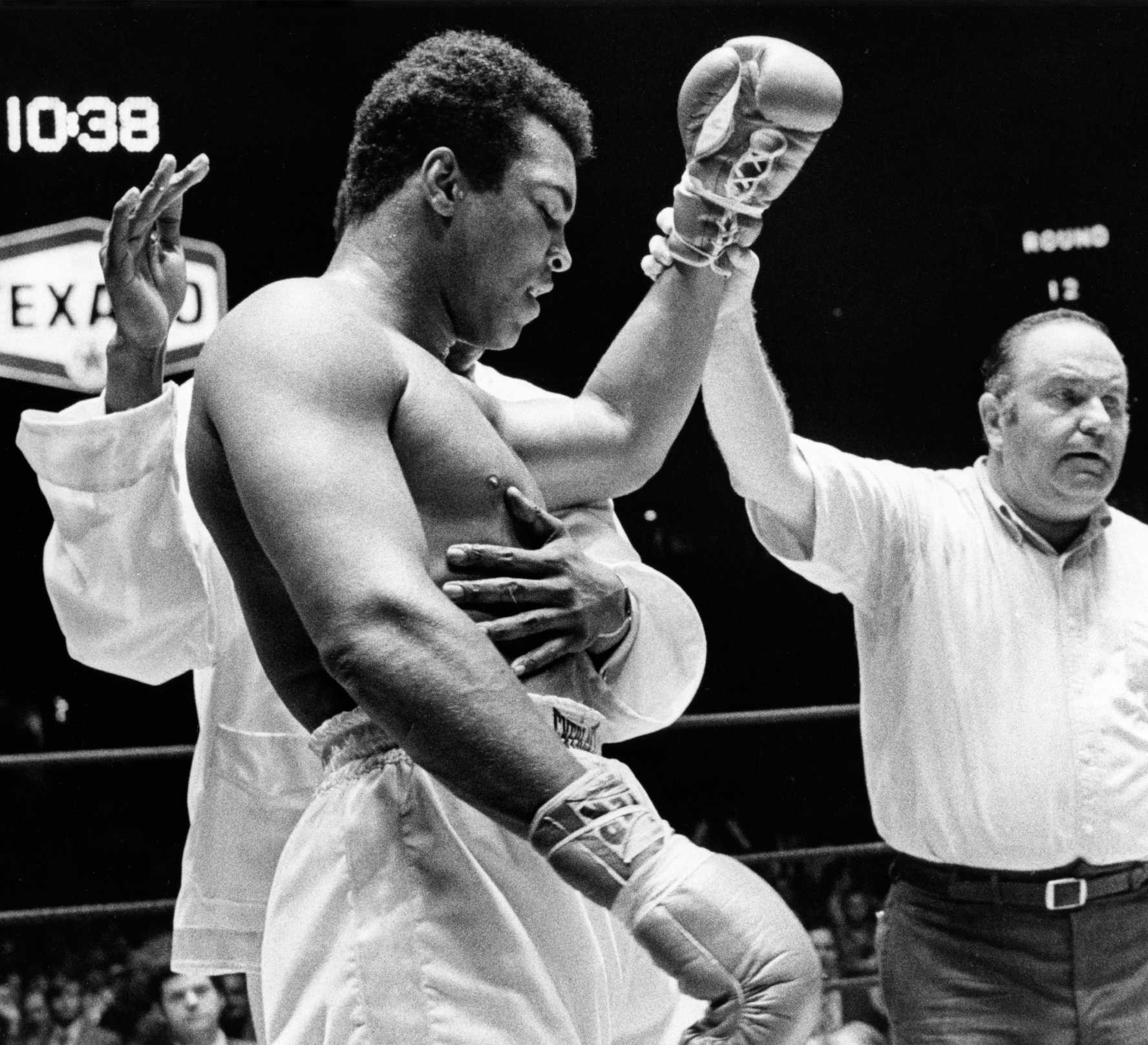
Ali declared the winner

Ellis made a good account of himself for the first three rounds, but in the fourth, a straight right by Ali buckled Ellis' legs. From there-on, Ellis would begin to take a beating, with Ali circling, jabbing, and occasionally planting his feet and throwing combinations to Ellis' head. Another straight right from Ali wobbled Ellis in the twelfth, Ali took his opportunity to pound on Ellis, and eventually won the bout through a technical knockout when the referee stopped the fight.

== Undercard ==
Confirmed bouts:

== Broadcasting ==
Country	Broadcaster
Philippines	ABS-CBN
United Kingdom	BBC

Preceded by vs. Joe Frazier	Muhammad Ali's bouts 26 July 1971	Succeeded by vs. Buster Mathis
Preceded by vs. George Chuvalo	Jimmy Ellis's bouts 26 July 1971	Succeeded by vs. Dick Gosha
