= Alice Martin =

American lawyer

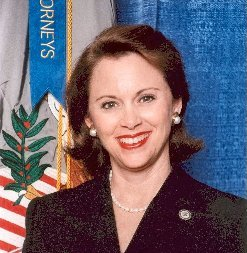

Attorney General of Alabama Acting
- In office February 9, 2017 – February 10, 2017
- Governor: Robert Bentley
- Preceded by: Luther Strange
- Succeeded by: Steve Marshall

United States Attorney for the Northern District of Alabama
- In office September 29, 2001 – June 8, 2009
- President: George W. Bush; Barack Obama
- Preceded by: Doug Jones
- Succeeded by: Joyce White Vance

Personal details
- Born: Alice Howze; 1955 or 1956 (age 68–69); Sledge, Mississippi, U.S
- Political party: Republican
- Education: Vanderbilt University (BSN); University of Mississippi, Oxford (JD)

Alice H. Martin (born 1955/56) is an American lawyer who was the Chief Deputy Attorney General of Alabama. Martin was the United States Attorney for the Northern District of Alabama from 2001 until 2009. She was nominated by President George W. Bush in 2001. During her term the office established a healthcare fraud task force which collected approximately $750M in qui tam settlements, as well as obtaining over 125 convictions of elected and appointed officials and contractors in public corruption prosecutions. In 2017, Martin served as the acting Attorney General of Alabama for a short period of time.

Martin tendered her resignation from office in June 2009, five months after the inauguration of Democratic President Barack Obama.

== Early life and education ==
Martin is a native of Sledge, Mississippi, and has lived in Alabama since 1988.

Martin graduated with a Bachelor of Science in Nursing from Vanderbilt University and is a Registered Nurse. She worked as a nurse during law school and received her Juris Doctor in 1981 from the University of Mississippi.

== Career ==
Martin began her legal career in Memphis, Tennessee in 1981 but soon entered a career of public service with the United States Attorney's Office for the Western District of Tennessee in 1983. She served as an Assistant U. S. Attorney from 1983 to 1988, and as a Special Assistant U. S. Attorney from 1988 to 1990. She focused on white collar prosecutions and medical malpractice defense for VA, military and Bureau of Prison hospitals. She entered the private legal sector upon moving to Alabama specializing in insurance defense work before being appointed as Lauderdale County Circuit Court Judge by Governor Fob James in 1997, to fill an unexpired judicial term.

Martin is licensed to practice law in Alabama, Mississippi and Tennessee. She is a Certified Fraud Examiner (CFE), and certified in Healthcare Privacy (HCPC), Healthcare Compliance (CHC), and civil and domestic relations mediation.

=== U.S. Attorney ===
After running unsuccessfully as a Republican in a county which had not elected a Republican since Reconstruction, Martin re-entered private practice. She then returned to public service when nominated by President George W. Bush as the first female United States Attorney for the Northern District of Alabama in September 2001, succeeding future U.S. Senator Doug Jones. During her 8 years of service, from 2001 to 2009, she was recognized nationally for a top ranked Healthcare Fraud Task Force which returned over $750M in qui tam settlements/recoveries to the U. S. Treasury, as well as the North Alabama Public Corruption Task Force which obtained over 125 convictions of elected/appointed officials and contractors including the Mayor of Birmingham, Alabama, 5 of 6 Jefferson County Commissioners, the Chancellor of Alabama Post-Secondary and several state legislators. Martin led the prosecution of the $2.8B accounting fraud that occurred at HealthSouth, which netted the first conviction under Sarbanes-Oxley and 17 convictions of corporate officers for various frauds and FCPA violations. She also oversaw the successful prosecution of Eric Robert Rudolph, the FBI's Most Wanted domestic terrorist for his bombing of a Birmingham abortion clinic.

After leaving public office, Martin served as the Vice President of Ethics and Compliance for RegionalCare Hospital Partners of Brentwood, Tennessee from 2010 until 2012. She then served as a healthcare compliance expert for various entities and returned to public service as Deputy Attorney General for the Alabama Department of Public Examiners, the financial watchdog agency for the State of Alabama. There she oversaw implementation of the Recovery Audit statute for Alabama.

=== Deputy Attorney General ===
Martin was selected to serve as Chief Deputy Attorney General by Attorney General Luther Strange in April 2015 and oversaw the legal and administrative operation of the Office of the Attorney General for the State of Alabama. She oversaw the grand jury investigation into sitting Gov. Robert J. Bentley, which eventually lead to his criminal conviction and resignation from office. Following the resignation of Strange on February 9, 2017, she served as acting Attorney General for one day until Governor Robert J. Bentley appointed Steve Marshall. She then resigned her office to run for Attorney General of Alabama. In the June 18, 2018 Republican primary election, she finished third place, behind former Alabama Attorney General Troy King and Steve Marshall, who subsequently won the runoff and general election.

Legal offices
Preceded by Luther Strange	Attorney General of Alabama; Acting; 2017	Succeeded by Steve Marshall
