= Sledge, Mississippi =

Town in Mississippi, United States

- Town
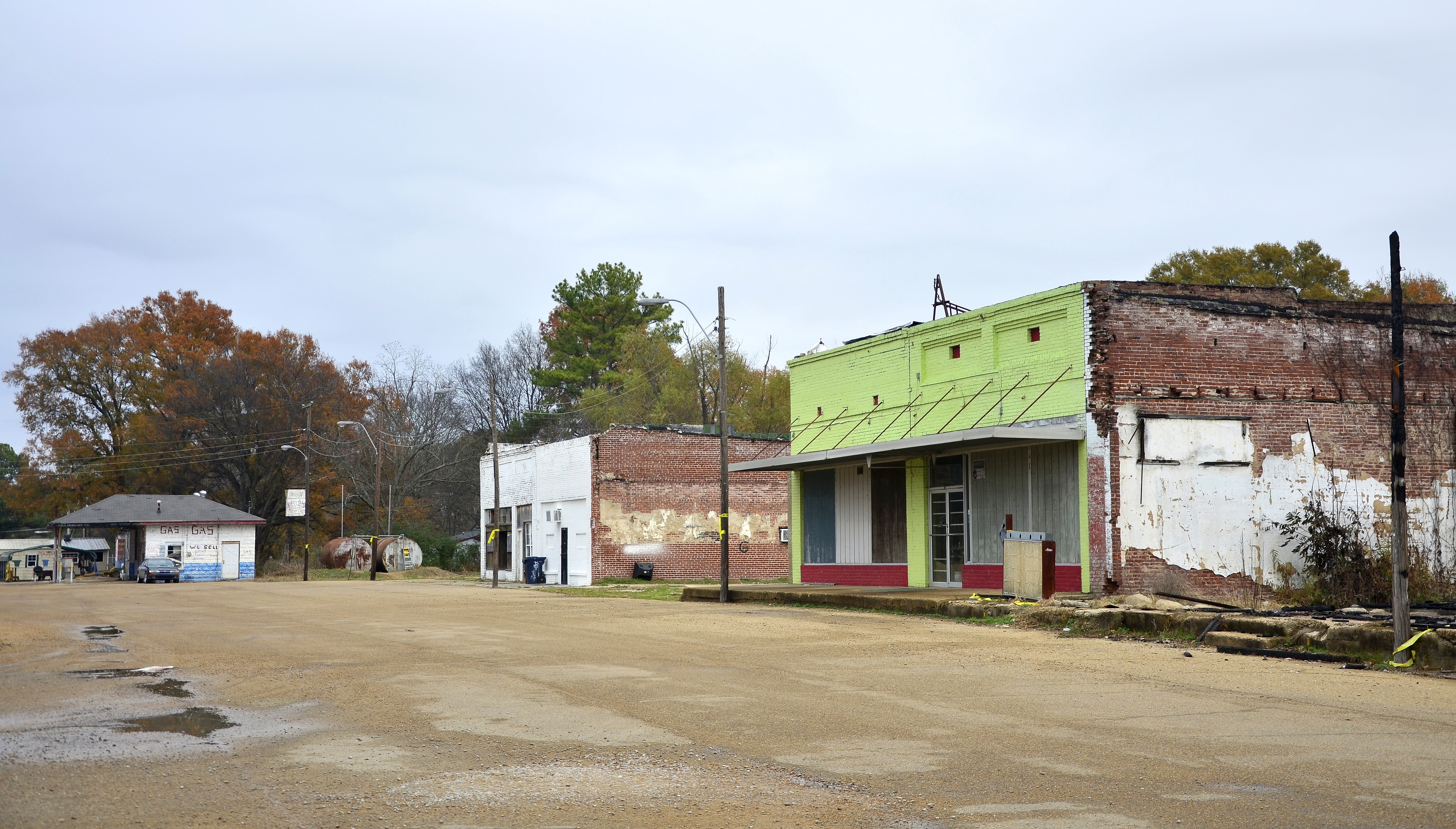
- Main Street in Sledge

- Location of Sledge, Mississippi

- Location in the United States
- Coordinates: 34°25′57″N 90°13′16″W
- Country: United States
- State: Mississippi
- County: Quitman

Area
  - Total: 0.53 sq mi (1.38 km^{2})
  - Land: 0.53 sq mi (1.38 km^{2})
  - Water: 0 sq mi (0.00 km^{2})
- Elevation: 167 ft (51 m)

Population (2020)
  - Total: 368
  - Density: 688.9/sq mi (265.99/km^{2})
- Time zone: UTC−6 (Central (CST))
  - Summer (DST): UTC−5 (CDT)
- ZIP Codes: 38628, 38670
- Area code: 662
- FIPS code: 28-68400
- GNIS feature ID: 2407351
- Website: sledgems.org

Sledge is a town located in Quitman County, Mississippi, United States. As of the 2020 census, the town had a total population of 368.

== Geography ==
According to the United States Census Bureau, the town has a total area of 0.5 square miles (1.3 km^{2}), all land.

== Demographics ==
Historical population
Census	Pop.	Note	%±
1930	337		—
1940	316		−6.2%
1950	383		21.2%
1960	440		14.9%
1970	516		17.3%
1980	699		35.5%
1990	577		−17.5%
2000	529		−8.3%
2010	545		3.0%
2020	368		−32.5%
U.S. Decennial Census; 2010 2020

=== Racial and ethnic composition ===
Sledge town, Mississippi – Racial and ethnic composition Note: the US Census treats Hispanic/Latino as an ethnic category. This table excludes Latinos from the racial categories and assigns them to a separate category. Hispanics/Latinos may be of any race.
Race / Ethnicity (NH = Non-Hispanic)	Pop 2000	Pop 2010	Pop 2020	% 2000	% 2010	% 2020
White alone (NH)	123	55	18	23.25%	10.09%	4.89%
Black or African American alone (NH)	398	486	349	75.24%	89.17%	94.84%
Native American or Alaska Native alone (NH)	0	0	0	0.00%	0.00%	0.00%
Asian alone (NH)	0	0	1	0.00%	0.00%	0.27%
Native Hawaiian or Pacific Islander alone (NH)	0	0	0	0.00%	0.00%	0.00%
Other race alone (NH)	0	0	0	0.00%	0.00%	0.00%
Mixed race or Multiracial (NH)	2	4	0	0.38%	0.73%	0.00%
Hispanic or Latino (any race)	6	0	0	1.13%	0.00%	0.00%
Total	529	545	368	100.00%	100.00%	100.00%

=== 2000 Census ===
As of the census of 2000, there were 529 people, 170 households, and 133 families residing in the town. The population density was 1,011.3 inhabitants per square mile (390.5/km^{2}). There were 185 housing units at an average density of 353.7 per square mile (136.6/km^{2}). The racial makeup of the town was 23.25% White, 75.99% African American, 0.00% Native American, 0.00% Asian, 0.00% Pacific Islander, 0.00% from other races, and 0.76% from two or more races. Of the population, 1.13% were Hispanic or Latino of any race.

There were 170 households, out of which 38.2% had children under the age of 18 living with them, 43.5% were married couples living together, 29.4% had a female householder with no husband present, and 21.2% were non-families. Of all households, 20.0% were made up of individuals, and 9.4% had someone living alone who was 65 years of age or older. The average household size was 3.11 and the average family size was 3.55.

In the town, the population was spread out, with 30.6% under the age of 18, 11.7% from 18 to 24, 28.7% from 25 to 44, 18.0% from 45 to 64, and 11.0% who were 65 years of age or older. The median age was 31 years. For every 100 females, there were 86.3 males. For every 100 females age 18 and over, there were 72.3 males.

The median income for a household in the town was $27,500, and the median income for a family was $30,139. Males had a median income of $23,750 versus $16,042 for females. The per capita income for the town was $11,569. 24.7% of the population and 23.1% of families were below the poverty line. Out of the total population, 37.5% of those under the age of 18 and 20.0% of those 65 and older were living below the poverty line.

== Transportation ==
Amtrak’s City of New Orleans, which operates between New Orleans and Chicago, passes through the town on CN tracks, but makes no stop. The nearest station is located in Marks, 13 miles (21 km) to the south.

== Education ==
The Town of Sledge is served by the Quitman County School District.

== Notable people ==
- Kate Campbell, musician
- Little Hatch, electric blues musician and harmonica player
- Alice Martin, former Chief Deputy Attorney General of Alabama
- Buster Mathis, professional boxer
- Charley Pride, country singer, born in Sledge.
- Mack Pride, baseball player, later a minister, born in Sledge.
