= Buster Mathis =

American boxer (1943–1995)

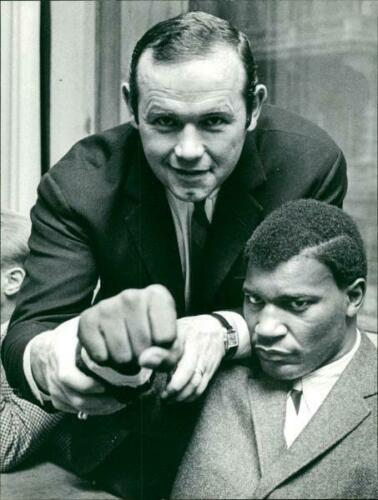
- Mathis (right) in Sweden in 1967

Personal information
- Born: Buster Mathis; June 11, 1943 Sledge, Mississippi, U.S.
- Died: September 6, 1995 (aged 52) Grand Rapids, Michigan, U.S.
- Height: 6 ft 3 in (1.91 m)
- Weight: Heavyweight

Boxing career
- Reach: 76 in (193 cm)
- Stance: Orthodox

Boxing record
- Total fights: 34
- Wins: 30
- Win by KO: 21
- Losses: 4
- Draws: 0

Buster Mathis (June 11, 1943 – September 6, 1995) was an American boxer who competed from 1965 to 1972. He was a top contender throughout his career, beating other top contenders including George Chuvalo and Chuck Wepner. He fought Heavyweight greats such as Muhammad Ali, Joe Frazier, Jerry Quarry and Ron Lyle; he also notably beat Joe Frazier as an amateur to qualify for the Olympics but was later replaced due to a hand injury.

== Career ==
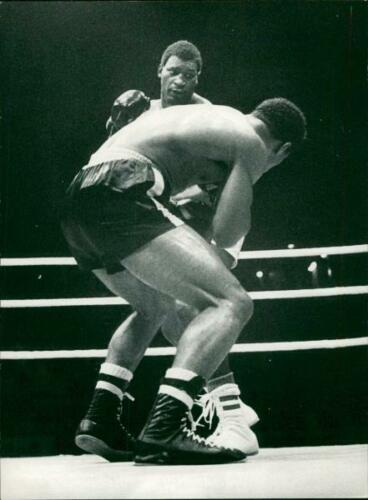
Mathis (back) vs. Roberto Davila in 1967

Mathis had a successful career as an amateur heavyweight boxer. He qualified for a spot in the 1964 Tokyo Olympics but had to withdraw due to an injury. He was replaced in the tournament by Joe Frazier, who went on to win the gold medal.

Mathis turned professional in June 1965 with a second round knockout victory over Bob Maynard. He went on to win his next 22 contests as well and qualified for a shot at the New York State Athletic Commission World Heavyweight Title, which had become vacant after Muhammad Ali was stripped of the title for refusing to be drafted into the United States Army.

The title fight was held on March 4, 1968, in New York's Madison Square Garden against "Smoking" Joe Frazier, his old rival. Frazier won by an 11th-round knockout.

Mathis continued to fight in the following years, outpointing George Chuvalo, but losing on points to Jerry Quarry - a fight Mathis was favored to win. Mathis retired after losing to Quarry in 1969, but he returned in 1971 to box Muhammad Ali for the NABF belt, losing on points over 12 rounds. Ali was later criticized for not finishing Mathis in the final rounds of the fight.

After Mathis was knocked out in just two rounds in September 1972 by Ron Lyle, he retired for good.

== Retirement ==
A 1980 Sports Illustrated article featured interviews with Mathis and many of Muhammad Ali's other opponents. It reported Mathis worked in the trucking business after he retired from the ring.

Mathis had various health problems in later years, including two strokes, a heart attack, and kidney failure. He died of heart failure at age 52. His son Buster Mathis Jr. became a professional boxer and fought Mike Tyson in 1995.

== Professional boxing record ==
30 Wins (21 knockouts, 9 decisions), 4 Losses (2 knockouts, 2 decisions)
Result	Record	Opponent	Type	Round	Date	Location	Notes
Loss	30–4	(United States) Ron Lyle	KO	2	29 Sep 1972	(United States) Denver Coliseum, Denver, Colorado	Mathis knocked out at 2:58 of the second round.
Win	30–3	(United States) Humphrey McBride	TKO	3	5 Sep 1972	(United States) Oklahoma City, Oklahoma	World Super Heavyweight Title. Referee stopped the bout at 1:34 of the third round.
Loss	29–3	(United States) Muhammad Ali	UD	12	17 Nov 1971	(United States) Astrodome, Houston, Texas	WBC NABF Heavyweight Title.
Loss	29–2	(United States) Jerry Quarry	UD	12	24 Mar 1969	(United States) Madison Square Garden, New York City	
Win	29–1	(Canada) George Chuvalo	UD	12	3 Feb 1969	(United States) Madison Square Garden, New York City	
Win	28–1	(United States) J.J. Woody	TKO	6	26 Sep 1968	(United States) Madison Square Garden, New York City	Referee stopped the bout at 2:59 of the sixth round.
Win	27–1	(United States) Dick Wipperman	UD	10	16 Sep 1968	(United States) County Stadium, Milwaukee, Wisconsin	
Win	26–1	(United States) Amos Lincoln	SD	10	5 Sep 1968	(United States) Olympic Auditorium, Los Angeles, California	
Win	25–1	(United States) J.J. Beattie	TKO	7	25 Jul 1968	(United States) Met Center, Bloomington, Minnesota	
Win	24–1	(United States) M.J. Turnbow	TKO	7	30 Apr 1968	(United States) Miami Beach Auditorium, Miami Beach, Florida	Referee stopped the bout at 2:44 of the seventh round.
Loss	23–1	(United States) Joe Frazier	TKO	11	4 Mar 1968	(United States) Madison Square Garden, New York City	NYSAC World Heavyweight Title. Referee stopped the bout at 2:33 of the 11th round.
Win	23–0	(South Africa) Gerry de Bruyn	KO	1	26 Dec 1967	(Sweden) Frolundaborg, Gothenburg	Bruyn knocked out at 0:36 of the first round.
Win	22–0	(Peru) Roberto Davila	TKO	7	18 Nov 1967	(Sweden) Johanneshov, Stockholm	
Win	21–0	(United States) Ron Marsh	TKO	4	18 Sep 1967	(United States) Madison Square Garden, New York City	Referee stopped the bout at 1:13 of the fourth round.
Win	20–0	(United States) Wayne Heath	KO	5	2 Aug 1967	(United States) Los Angeles Memorial Sports Arena, Los Angeles, California	Heath knocked out at 1:16 of the fifth round.
Win	19–0	(United States) Sonny S.D. Moore	TKO	5	23 May 1967	(United States) Saint Louis, Missouri	Referee stopped the bout at 2:09 of the fifth round.
Win	18–0	(United States) Ed "Baker Boy" Hurley	KO	1	12 May 1967	(United States) Detroit, Michigan	
Win	17–0	(United States) Waban Thomas	KO	1	6 Feb 1967	(United States) Astrodome, Houston, Texas	Thomas knocked out at 2:23 of the first round.
Win	16–0	(United States) E.S. Andrews	KO	2	17 Nov 1966	(United States) Portland Exposition Building, Portland, Maine	Andrews knocked out at 2:10 of the second round.
Win	15–0	(Canada) Johnny Barazza	KO	1	2 Nov 1966	(United States) Civic Center, Grand Rapids, Michigan	
Win	14–0	(United States) Earl Averette	TKO	3	28 Sep 1966	(United States) Cambria County War Memorial Arena, Johnstown, Pennsylvania	
Win	13–0	(United States) Bob Stallings	SD	10	15 Sep 1966	(United States) Armory, Akron, Ohio	
Win	12–0	(United States) Mert Brownfield	KO	1	29 Aug 1966	(United States) Cobo Arena, Detroit, Michigan	
Win	11–0	(Canada) Charley E. Chase	UD	6	28 Jul 1966	(United States) Portland Exposition Building, Portland, Maine	
Win	10–0	(United States) Everett Copeland	KO	2	23 Jun 1966	(United States) Madison Square Garden, New York City	Copeland knocked out at 2:27 of the second round.
Win	9–0	(United States) Tom Swift	KO	1	16 Jun 1966	(United States) Portland Exposition Building, Portland, Maine	
Win	8–0	(United States) Charley Polite	PTS	6	16 Feb 1966	(United States) Westchester County Center, White Plains, New York	
Win	7–0	(United States) Mike Bruce	TKO	5	19 Jan 1966	(United States) Westchester County Center, White Plains, New York	
Win	6–0	(United States) Chuck Wepner	TKO	3	7 Jan 1966	(United States) Madison Square Garden, New York City	Referee stopped the bout at 1:58 of the third round.
Win	5–0	(United States) Charlie Lee	PTS	6	15 Dec 1965	(United States) Westchester County Center, White Plains, New York	
Win	4–0	(United States) Bob Stallings	UD	6	23 Sep 1965	(United States) Grand Rapids, Michigan	
Win	3–0	(Canada) Bob Maynard	PTS	4	30 Aug 1965	(Canada) Paul Sauve Arena, Montreal, Quebec	
Win	2–0	(Canada) Johnny Shore	TKO	2	28 Aug 1965	(Canada) Rock Island, Quebec	Referee stopped the bout at 2:45 of the second round.
Win	1–0	(Canada) Bob Maynard	TKO	2	28 Jun 1965	(Canada) Paul Sauve Arena, Montreal, Quebec	
