= 2016 United States House of Representatives elections in Alabama =

- November 8, 2016

All 7 Alabama seats to the United States House of Representatives
	Majority party	Minority party
Party	Republican	Democratic
Last election	6	1
Seats won	6	1
Seat change	Steady	Steady
Popular vote	1,222,018	621,911
Percentage	64.67%	32.91%
Swing	▼0.51%	▲2.22%

Republican
40–50%
50–60%
60–70%
70–80%
80–90%
>90%
Democratic
40–50%
50–60%
60–70%
70–80%
80–90%
>90%

The 2016 United States House of Representatives elections in Alabama were held on November 8, 2016, to elect the seven U.S. representatives from the state of Alabama, one from each of the state's seven congressional districts. The elections coincided with the 2016 U.S. presidential election, as well as other elections to the House of Representatives, elections to the United States Senate, and various state and local elections. The primaries were held on March 1.

== Overview ==
=== Statewide ===
Popular vote
Republican	64.67%
Democratic	32.91%
Other	2.42%

House seats
Republican	85.72%
Democratic	14.28%

=== District ===
Results of the 2016 United States House of Representatives elections in Alabama by district:

District	Republican		Democratic		Others		Total		Result
District	Votes	%	Votes	%	Votes	%	Votes	%	Result
District 1	208,083	96.38%	0	0.00%	7,810	3.62%	215,893	100.0%	Republican hold
District 2	134,886	48.77%	112,089	40.53%	29,609	10.71%	276,584	100.0%	Republican hold
District 3	192,164	66.93%	94,549	32.93%	391	0.14%	287,104	100.0%	Republican hold
District 4	235,925	98.53%	0	0.00%	3,519	1.47%	239,444	100.0%	Republican hold
District 5	205,647	66.70%	102,234	33.16%	445	0.14%	308,326	100.0%	Republican hold
District 6	245,313	74.49%	83,709	25.42%	284	0.09%	329,306	100.0%	Republican hold
District 7	0	0.00%	229,330	98.41%	3,698	1.59%	233,028	100.0%	Democratic hold
Total	1,222,018	64.67%	621,911	32.91%	45,756	2.42%	1,889,685	100.0%	

== District 1 ==
2016 Alabama's 1st congressional district election
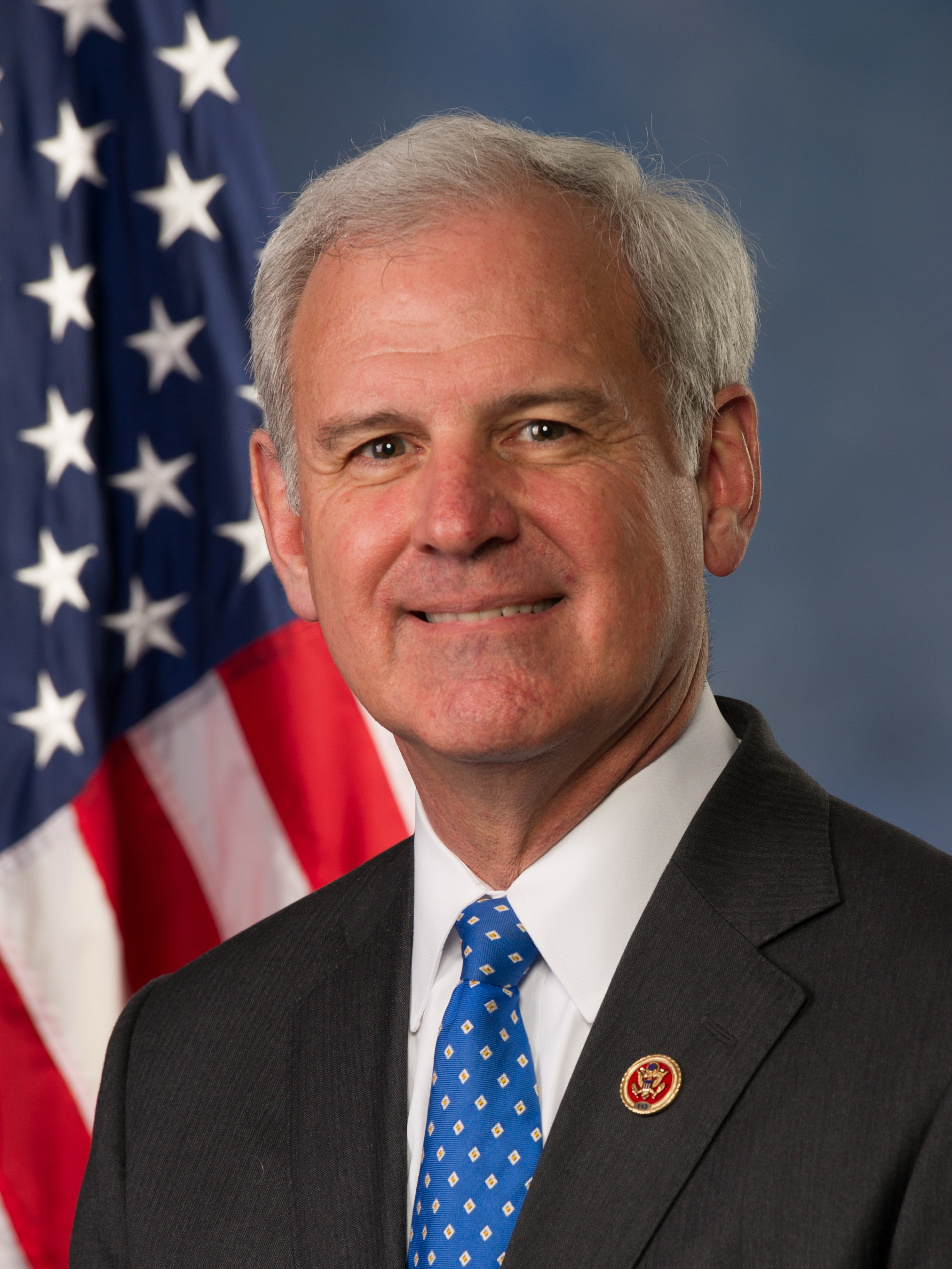
Nominee	Bradley Byrne
Party	Republican
Popular vote	208,083
Percentage	96.38%
U.S. Representative before election
Bradley Byrne
Republican
Elected U.S. Representative
Bradley Byrne
Republican

Incumbent Republican Bradley Byrne, who had represented the district since 2013, ran for re-election. He was re-elected with 68% of the vote in 2014. The district had a PVI of R+15.

=== Republican Party ===
==== Candidates ====
===== Nominee =====
- Bradley Byrne, incumbent U.S. Representative

===== Eliminated in primary =====
- Dean Young, businessman and candidate for this seat in 2013

==== Primary results ====
Republican primary results
Party	Candidate	Votes	%
Republican	Bradley Byrne (incumbent)	71,310	60.1
Republican	Dean Young	47,319	39.9
Total votes		118,629	100.0

=== Democratic primary ===
No Democrats filed.

=== General election ===
==== Predictions ====
Source	Ranking	As of
The Cook Political Report	Safe R	November 7, 2016
Daily Kos Elections	Safe R	November 7, 2016
Rothenberg	Safe R	November 3, 2016
Sabato's Crystal Ball	Safe R	November 7, 2016
RCP	Safe R	October 31, 2016

==== Results ====
2016 Alabama's 1st congressional district election
Party	Candidate	Votes	%
Republican	Bradley Byrne (incumbent)	208,083	96.4
Write-in		7,810	3.6
Total votes		215,893	100.0
Republican hold			

== District 2 ==
2016 Alabama's 2nd congressional district election
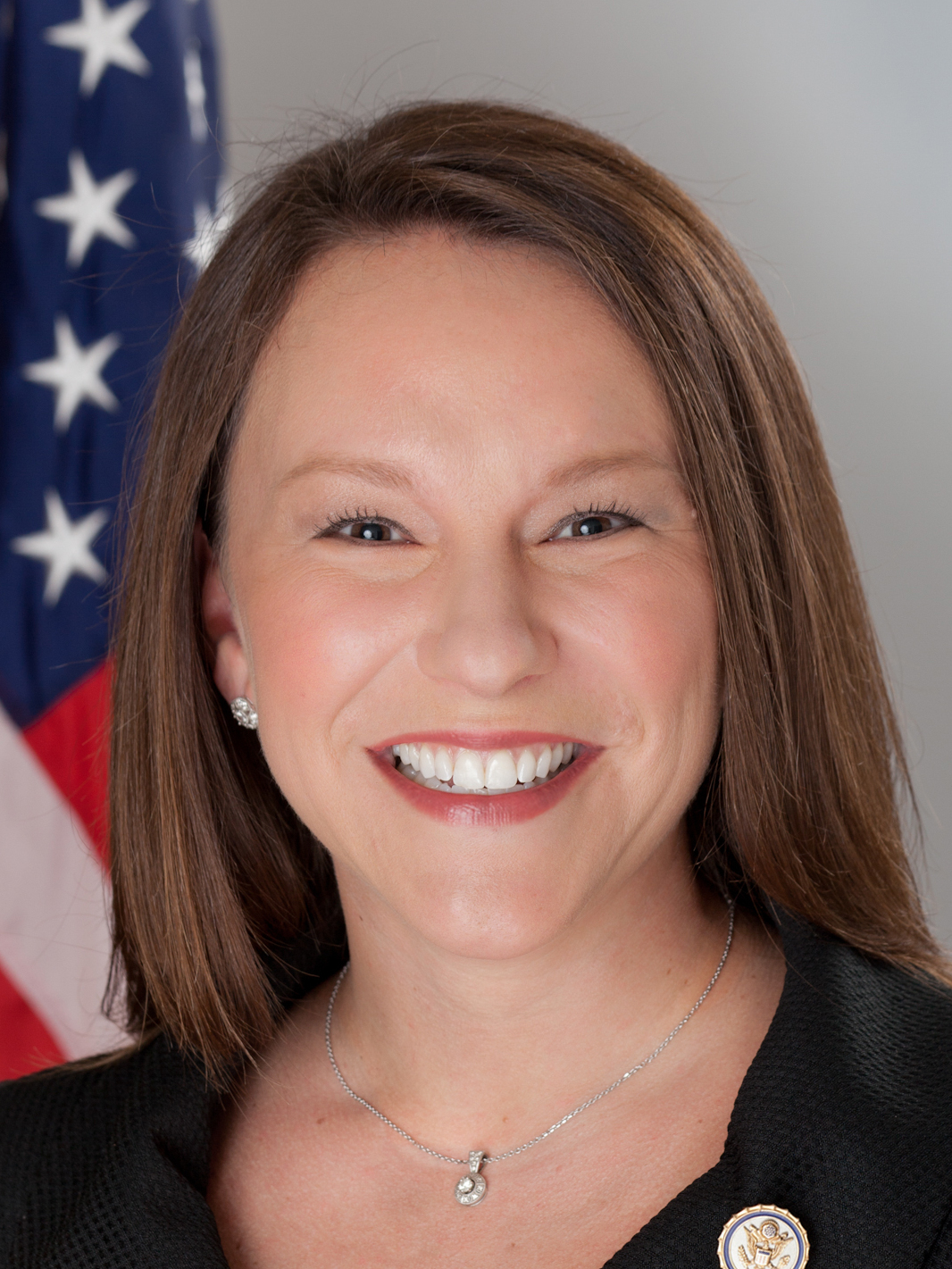

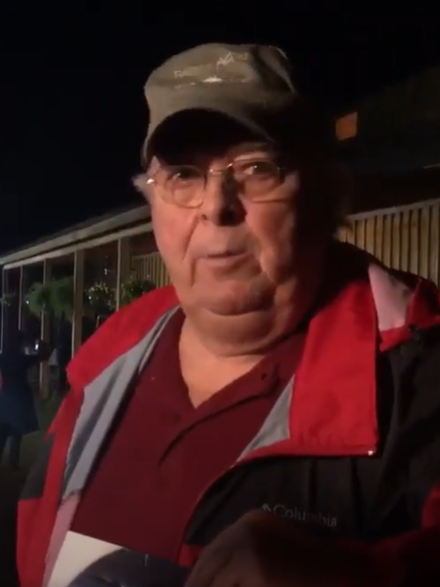
Nominee	Martha Roby	Nathan Mathis
Party	Republican	Democratic
Popular vote	134,886	112,089
Percentage	48.8%	40.5%
- Roby: 40–50% 50–60% 60–70% Mathis: 40–50% 50–60% 70–80%
U.S. Representative before election
Martha Roby
Republican
Elected U.S. Representative
Martha Roby
Republican

Incumbent Republican Martha Roby, who had represented the district since 2011, ran for re-election. She was re-elected with 67% of the vote in 2014. The district had a PVI of R+17.

=== Republican Party ===
Rob John had filed paperwork with the FEC to run as an Independent. After Gerritson declared her candidacy, John announced that he was suspending his campaign and endorsing her.

==== Candidates ====
===== Nominee =====
- Martha Roby, incumbent U.S. Representative

===== Eliminated in primary =====
- Becky Gerritson, Tea Party activist
- Robert L. "Bob" Rogers, teacher and electrical contractor

==== Primary results ====
Republican primary results
Party	Candidate	Votes	%
Republican	Martha Roby (incumbent)	78,689	66.4
Republican	Becky Gerritson	33,015	27.8
Republican	Robert L. "Bob" Rogers	6,856	5.8
Total votes		118,560	100.0

=== Democratic Party ===
==== Candidates ====
===== Nominee =====
- Nathan Mathis, former state representative and perennial candidate

=== General election ===
==== Predictions ====
Source	Ranking	As of
The Cook Political Report	Safe R	November 7, 2016
Daily Kos Elections	Safe R	November 7, 2016
Rothenberg	Safe R	November 3, 2016
Sabato's Crystal Ball	Safe R	November 7, 2016
RCP	Safe R	October 31, 2016

==== Results ====
2016 Alabama's 2nd congressional district election
Party	Candidate	Votes	%
Republican	Martha Roby (incumbent)	134,886	48.8
Democratic	Nathan Mathis	112,089	40.5
Write-in		29,609	10.7
Total votes		276,584	100.0
Republican hold			

== District 3 ==
2016 Alabama's 3rd congressional district election
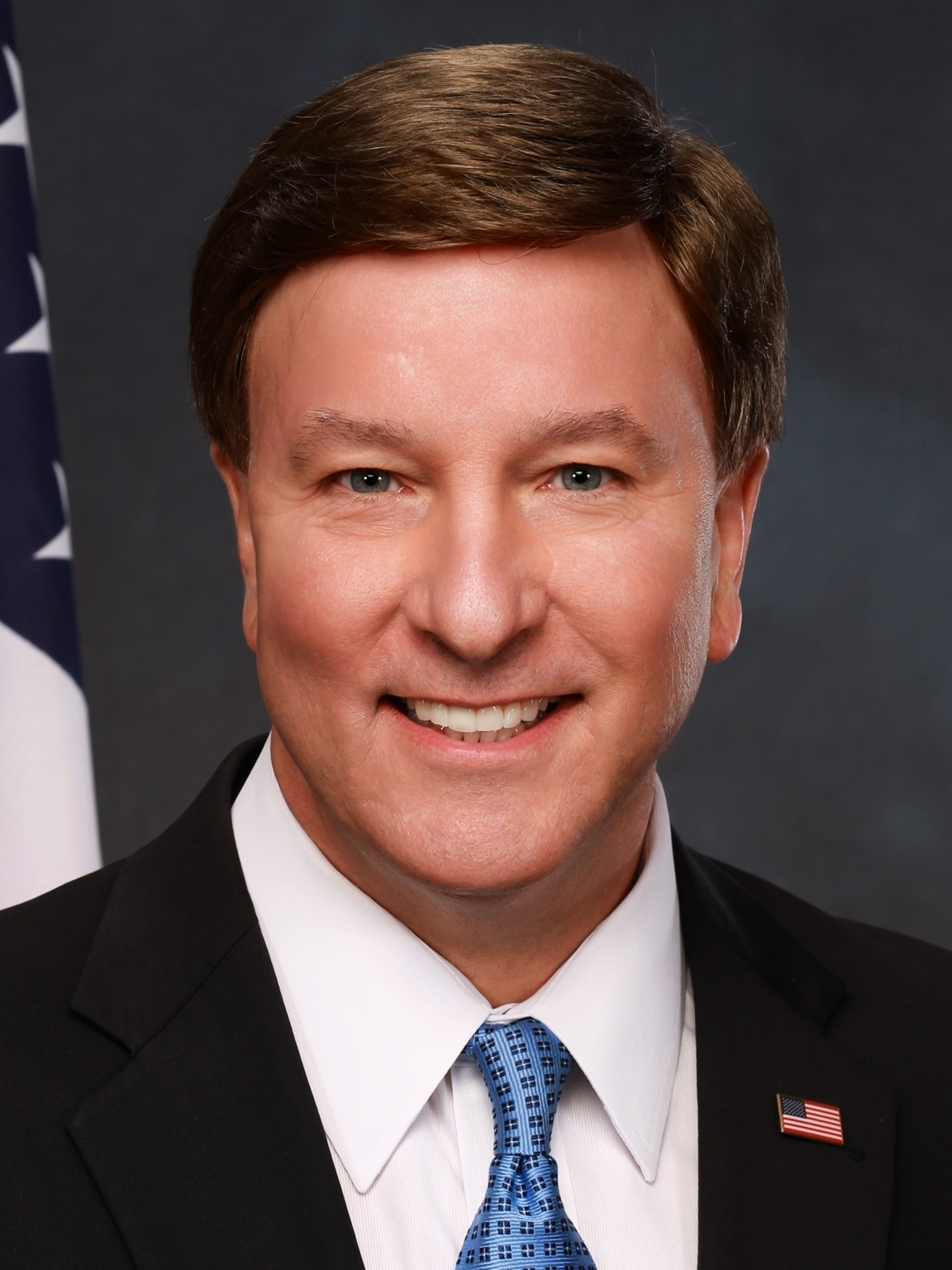

Nominee	Mike Rogers	Jesse Smith
Party	Republican	Democratic
Popular vote	192,164	94,549
Percentage	66.9%	32.9%
- County results Rogers: 50–60% 60–70% 70–80% 80–90% Smith: 80–90%
U.S. Representative before election
Mike Rogers
Republican
Elected U.S. Representative
Mike Rogers
Republican

Incumbent Republican Mike Rogers, who had represented the district since 2003, ran for re-election. He was re-elected with 66% of the vote in 2014. The district had a PVI of R+16.

=== Republican Party ===
==== Candidates ====
===== Nominee =====
- Mike Rogers, incumbent U.S. Representative

===== Eliminated in primary =====
- Larry DiChiara, former Phenix City Schools Superintendent

==== Primary results ====
Republican primary results
Party	Candidate	Votes	%
Republican	Mike Rogers (incumbent)	77,432	76.0
Republican	Larry DiChiara	24,474	24.0
Total votes		101,906	100.0

=== Democratic Party ===
==== Candidates ====
===== Nominee =====
- Jesse Smith, U.S. Army veteran and nominee for this seat in 2014

=== General election ===
==== Predictions ====
Source	Ranking	As of
The Cook Political Report	Safe R	November 7, 2016
Daily Kos Elections	Safe R	November 7, 2016
Rothenberg	Safe R	November 3, 2016
Sabato's Crystal Ball	Safe R	November 7, 2016
RCP	Safe R	October 31, 2016

==== Results ====
2016 Alabama's 3rd congressional district election
Party	Candidate	Votes	%
Republican	Mike Rogers (incumbent)	192,164	66.9
Democratic	Jesse Smith	94,549	32.9
Write-in		391	0.2
Total votes		287,104	100.0
Republican hold			

== District 4 ==
2016 Alabama's 4th congressional district election
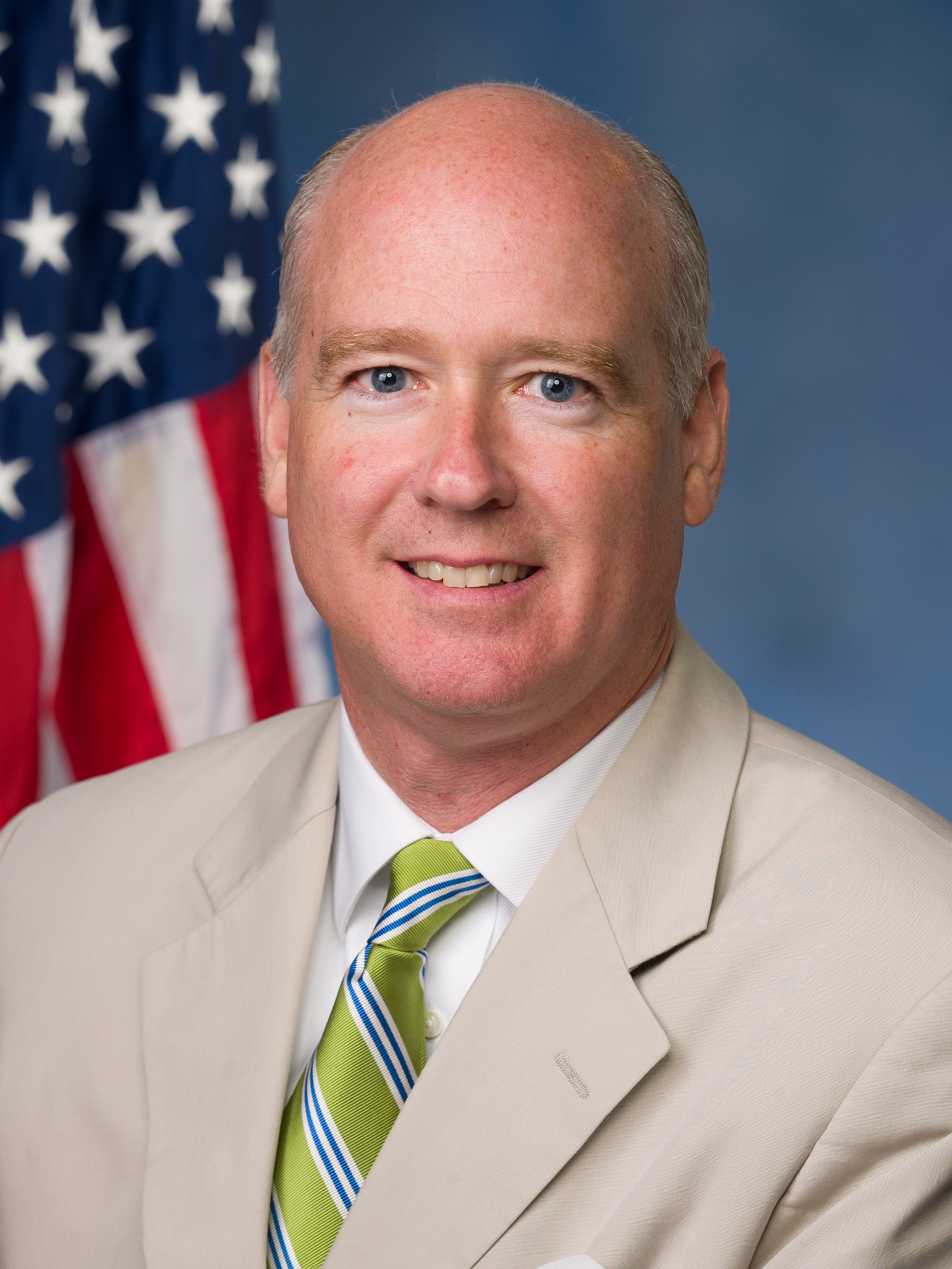
Nominee	Robert Aderholt
Party	Republican
Popular vote	235,925
Percentage	98.5%
U.S. Representatives before election
Robert Aderholt
Republican
Elected U.S. Representatives
Robert Aderholt
Republican

Incumbent Republican Robert Aderholt, who had represented the district since 1997, ran for re-election. He was re-elected unopposed in 2014. The district had a PVI of R+28.

=== Republican Party ===
==== Candidates ====
===== Nominee =====
- Robert Aderholt, incumbent U.S. Representative

===== Eliminated in primary =====
- Phil Norris, retired United States Navy submariner and candidate for 7th district in 2012

==== Primary results ====
Republican primary results
Party	Candidate	Votes	%
Republican	Robert Aderholt (incumbent)	86,660	81.2
Republican	Phil Norris	20,096	18.8
Total votes		106,756	100.0

=== Democratic primary ===
No Democrats filed.

=== General election ===
==== Predictions ====
Source	Ranking	As of
The Cook Political Report	Safe R	November 7, 2016
Daily Kos Elections	Safe R	November 7, 2016
Rothenberg	Safe R	November 3, 2016
Sabato's Crystal Ball	Safe R	November 7, 2016
RCP	Safe R	October 31, 2016

==== Results ====
2016 Alabama's 4th congressional district election
Party	Candidate	Votes	%
Republican	Robert Aderholt (incumbent)	235,925	98.5
Write-in		3,519	1.5
Total votes		239,444	100.0
Republican hold			

== District 5 ==
2016 Alabama's 5th congressional district election
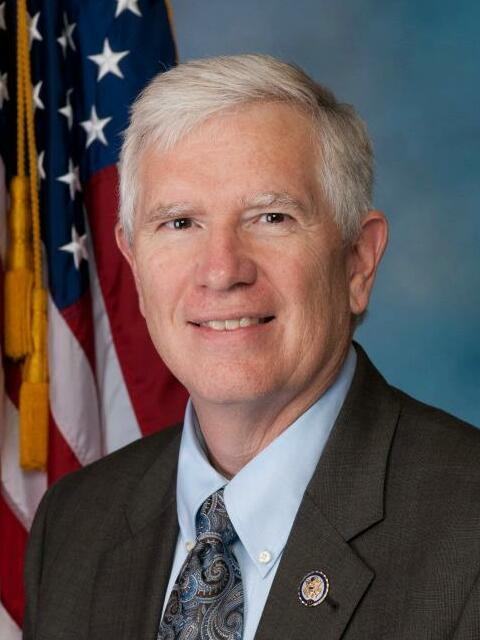

Nominee	Mo Brooks	Will Boyd
Party	Republican	Democratic
Popular vote	205,647	102,234
Percentage	66.7%	33.2%
- County results Brooks: 60–70% 70–80%
U.S. Representative before election
Mo Brooks
Republican
Elected U.S. Representative
Mo Brooks
Republican

Incumbent Republican Mo Brooks, who had represented the district since 2011, ran for re-election. He was re-elected with 74% of the vote in 2014. The district had a PVI of R+17.

=== Republican Party ===
==== Candidates ====
===== Nominee =====
- Mo Brooks, incumbent U.S. Representative

=== Democratic Party ===
==== Candidates ====
===== Nominee =====
- Will Boyd, pastor, former Greenville, Illinois City Councilman and write-in candidate for the United States Senate from Illinois in 2010

=== General election ===
==== Predictions ====
Source	Ranking	As of
The Cook Political Report	Safe R	November 7, 2016
Daily Kos Elections	Safe R	November 7, 2016
Rothenberg	Safe R	November 3, 2016
Sabato's Crystal Ball	Safe R	November 7, 2016
RCP	Safe R	October 31, 2016

==== Results ====
2016 Alabama's 5th congressional district election
Party	Candidate	Votes	%
Republican	Mo Brooks (incumbent)	205,647	66.7
Democratic	Will Boyd Jr.	102,234	33.2
Write-in		445	0.1
Total votes		308,326	100.0
Republican hold			

== District 6 ==
2016 Alabama's 6th congressional district election
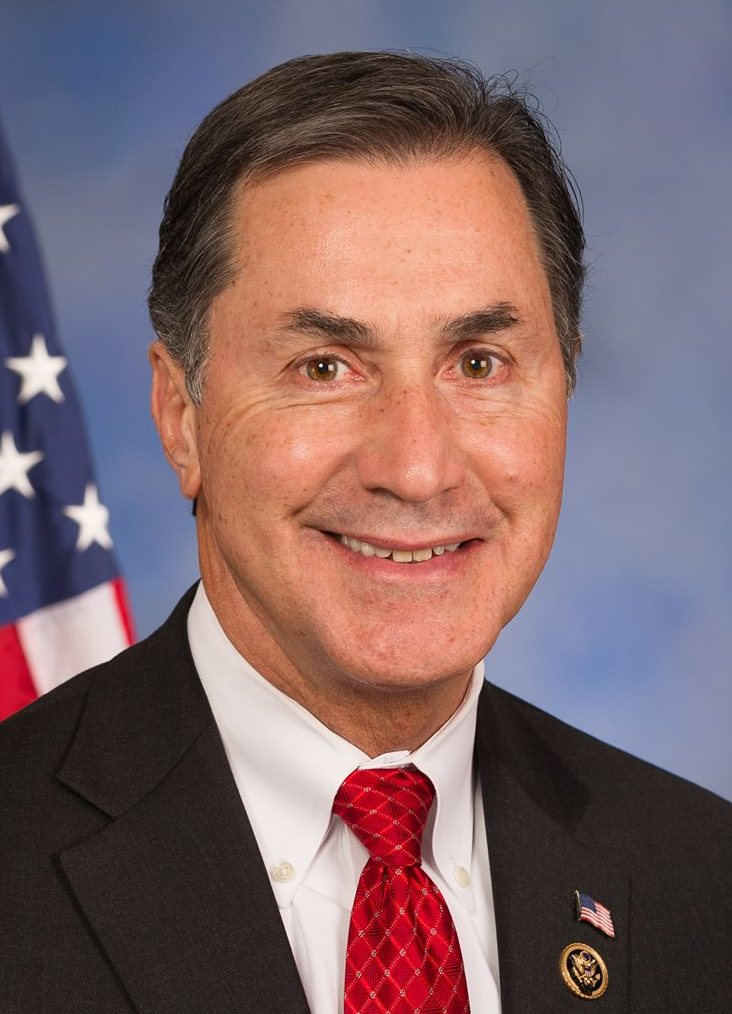

Nominee	Gary Palmer	David Putman
Party	Republican	Democratic
Popular vote	245,313	83,709
Percentage	74.5%	25.4%
- County results Palmer: 60–70% 70–80% 80–90%
U.S. Representatives before election
Gary Palmer
Republican
Elected U.S. Representatives
Gary Palmer
Republican

Incumbent Republican Gary Palmer, who had represented the district since 2015, ran for re-election. He was elected with 76% of the vote in 2014. The district had a PVI of R+28

=== Republican Party ===
==== Candidates ====
===== Nominee =====
- Gary Palmer, incumbent U.S. Representative

=== Democratic Party ===
==== Candidates ====
===== Nominee =====
- David Putman, businessman

=== General election ===
==== Predictions ====
Source	Ranking	As of
The Cook Political Report	Safe R	November 7, 2016
Daily Kos Elections	Safe R	November 7, 2016
Rothenberg	Safe R	November 3, 2016
Sabato's Crystal Ball	Safe R	November 7, 2016
RCP	Safe R	October 31, 2016

==== Results ====
2016 Alabama's 6th congressional district election
Party	Candidate	Votes	%
Republican	Gary Palmer (incumbent)	245,313	74.5
Democratic	David J. Putman	83,709	25.4
Write-in		284	0.1
Total votes		329,306	100.0
Republican hold			

== District 7 ==
2016 Alabama's 7th congressional district election
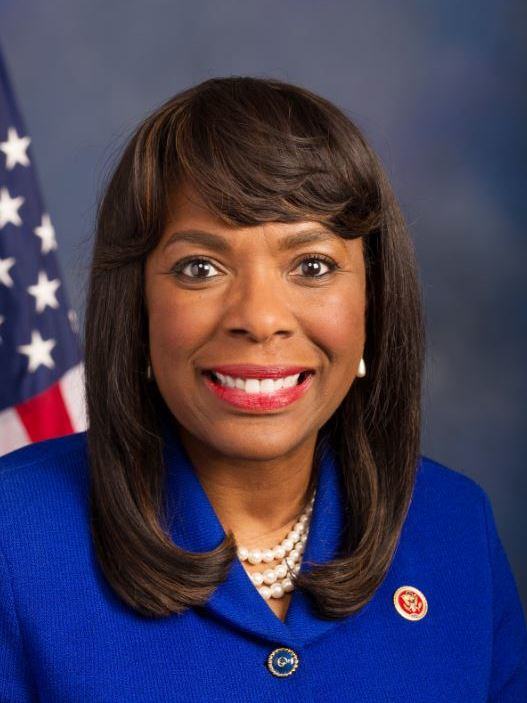
Nominee	Terri Sewell
Party	Democratic
Popular vote	229,330
Percentage	98.4%
U.S. Representative before election
Terri Sewell
Democratic
Elected U.S. Representative
Terri Sewell
Democratic

Incumbent Democrat Terri Sewell, who had represented the district since 2011, ran for re-election. She was re-elected without opposition in the general election in 2014. The district had a PVI of D+20.

=== Democratic Party ===
==== Candidates ====
===== Nominee =====
- Terri Sewell, incumbent U.S. Representative

=== Republican Party ===
==== Candidates ====
David Van Williams originally qualified to run for this district as a Republican, but was removed from the ballot.

=== General election ===
==== Predictions ====
Source	Ranking	As of
The Cook Political Report	Safe D	November 7, 2016
Daily Kos Elections	Safe D	November 7, 2016
Rothenberg	Safe D	November 3, 2016
Sabato's Crystal Ball	Safe D	November 7, 2016
RCP	Safe D	October 31, 2016

==== Results ====
2016 Alabama's 7th congressional district election
Party	Candidate	Votes	%
Democratic	Terri Sewell (incumbent)	229,330	98.4
Write-in		3,698	1.6
Total votes		233,028	100.0
Democratic hold			
