= Mike Rogers (Alabama politician) =

American lawyer and politician (born 1958)

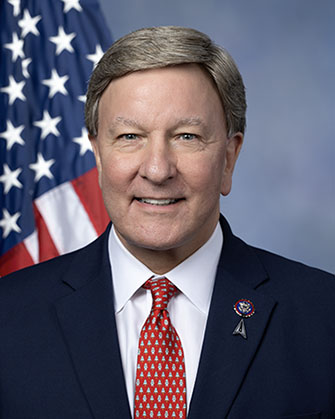
- Official portrait, 2024

Chair of the House Armed Services Committee
- Incumbent
- Assumed office January 3, 2023
- Preceded by: Adam Smith

Ranking Member of the House Armed Services Committee
- In office January 3, 2021 – January 3, 2023
- Preceded by: Mac Thornberry
- Succeeded by: Adam Smith

Ranking Member of the House Homeland Security Committee
- In office January 3, 2019 – January 3, 2021
- Preceded by: Bennie Thompson
- Succeeded by: John Katko

Member of the U.S. House of Representatives from Alabama's 3rd district
- Incumbent
- Assumed office January 3, 2003
- Preceded by: Bob Riley

Member of the Alabama House of Representatives from the 36th district
- In office 1994–2002
- Preceded by: James Campbell
- Succeeded by: Randy Wood

Personal details
- Born: Michael Dennis Rogers; July 16, 1958 (age 68) Hammond, Indiana, U.S.
- Party: Republican
- Spouse: Beth Phillips (m. 1982)
- Children: 3
- Education: Jacksonville State University (BA, MPA); Birmingham School of Law (JD)
- Website: House website Campaign website
- Rogers's voice Rogers supporting the FY2024 National Defense Authorization Act. Recorded July 12, 2023

Michael Dennis Rogers (born July 16, 1958) is an American lawyer and politician serving as the U.S. representative for Alabama's 3rd congressional district since 2003. He is a member of the Republican Party. Rogers is the Chair of the House Armed Services Committee where he served as the Ranking Member from 2021 to 2023 and as the Ranking Member of the House Homeland Security Committee from 2019 to 2021.

== Early life and education ==
Rogers is a sixth-generation resident of Calhoun County in East Alabama. After graduating from Saks High School in 1976, he earned both his Bachelor of Arts degree in political science and his Master of Public Administration from Jacksonville State University. He received his Juris Doctor from the Birmingham School of Law.

== Early political career ==
At age 28, Rogers became the youngest person to join the Calhoun County Commission, serving from 1987 to 1990. In 1994, Rogers won a seat in the Alabama House of Representatives, and became minority leader in his second term.

== U.S. House of Representatives ==
=== Elections ===
In 2002, U.S. Representative Bob Riley was elected governor of Alabama, leaving Alabama's 3rd congressional district seat vacant. Rogers won the Republican nomination. In the general election, he faced Democratic veteran Joe Turnham Jr., who had served three years as state party chairman and had run against Riley for Congress in 1998. The Democratic and Republican national parties targeted the district, with Speaker Dennis Hastert promising Rogers a seat on the Armed Services Committee should he win. Rogers outspent Turnham, raising and spending $1,656,290 to Turnham's $1,015,132, and held an even greater margin in independent expenditures. Rogers defeated Turnham, 50% to 48%. In this election, he was a rare Republican endorsee of The Anniston Star.

==== Campaign contributions from ARMPAC ====
Rogers received campaign contributions from former House Majority Leader Tom DeLay's ARMPAC. DeLay was convicted of felony money laundering of campaign finances and conspiracy to launder money. As of August 2016, Rogers has not offered to return any of the $30,000 he received. Rogers said that DeLay is innocent until proven guilty, and that he would not return the money "while the judicial process runs its course".

=== Tenure ===
==== 112th Congress (2011–2013) ====
In December 2011, Rogers voted in support of H.R. 10, the Regulations from the Executive in Need of Scrutiny Act, which would have required Congressional approval for any "major regulations" issued by the executive branch but, unlike the 1996 Congressional Review Act, would not require the president's signature or override of a probable presidential veto.

==== 115th Congress (2017–2019) ====
In 2017, Rogers worked with Representative Jim Cooper on a proposal to establish a Space Corps under the Department of the Air Force. The proposal passed the House and failed in the Senate. A bill with very similar language was signed into law two years later to create the United States Space Force. Rogers has been a major proponent of the Space Development Agency and taking an aggressive approach to space militarization.

In August 2017, Rogers held a town hall event in Oxford, Alabama, focused on efforts to repeal to the Affordable Care Act. During the town hall, a constituent raised questions about campaign donations to Rogers and his wife Beth, a Calhoun County District Court judge. The constituent specifically asked about monetary contributions to the Rogerses from Mike Hubbard, who was convicted of ethics violations in 2016. Rogers said that Hubbard was a family friend and appeared to threaten the constituent, saying, "you keep my wife out of this and be a man or we'll take it outside". The constituent said he filed a complaint with the Oxford police department over Rogers's comments.

==== 117th Congress (2021–2023) ====
Rogers was at the U.S. Capitol on January 6, 2021, when it was attacked. The next day, he tweeted, "there is no place for political violence in America" and called for law and order. Even after the attack, Rogers supported efforts to overturn the 2020 presidential election results, voting to oppose the certification. He voted against impeaching Donald Trump a second time in the wake of the attack. His rationale for his decision was that the impeachment was a partisan action by Nancy Pelosi that would "further divide our nation".

Rogers voted against the American Rescue Plan in February 2021. His rationale for opposing the bill was that it was full of "extreme socialist initiatives" and too expensive, and that it was too soon for another bill after the December 2020 Consolidated Appropriations Act. He also said the bill did not support schools reopening and that it funded abortions.

As of October 2021, Rogers had voted in line with Joe Biden's stated position 10.3% of the time.

==== 118th Congress (2023–2025) ====
During the January 2023 Speaker of the United States House of Representatives election, Rogers suggested that committee assignments be stripped from representatives who did not vote for Kevin McCarthy. He told Politico that his comments were more than a threat, saying "I promised it". Rogers called the representatives voting against McCarthy "legislative terrorists who have no problem killing the hostage".

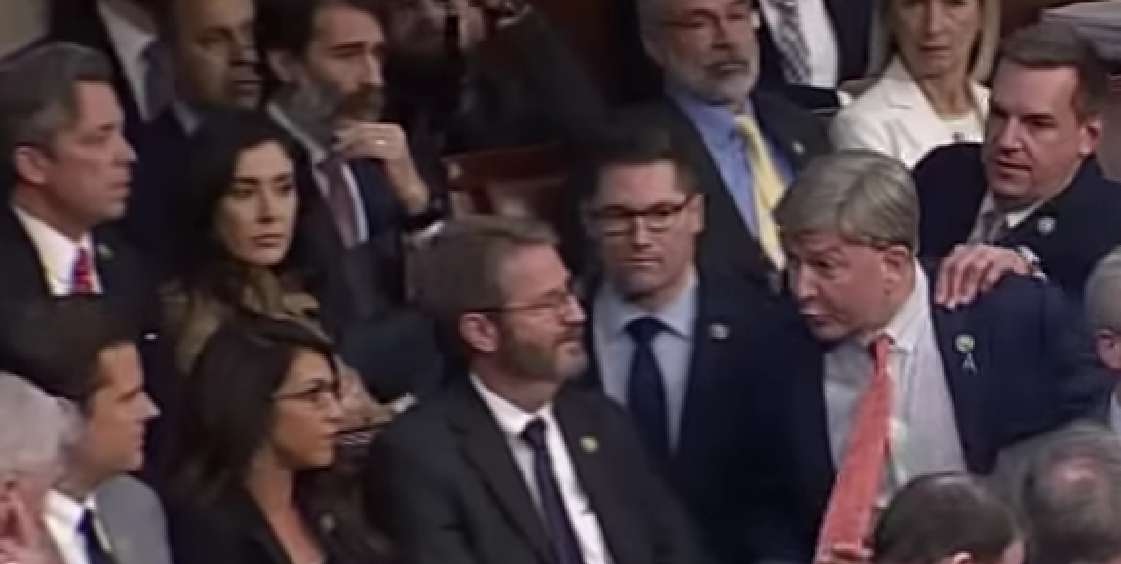
Richard Hudson (far right) restrains Rogers as he lunges at Matt Gaetz (far left)

During the 14th ballot for Speaker, Rogers lunged at Representative Matt Gaetz after Gaetz spoke with McCarthy. Representative Richard Hudson then had to physically restrain Rogers. The Associated Press reported that Rogers "charged" at Gaetz before Hudson pulled Rogers back by the shoulder, then the face. According to The New York Times, Gaetz was seeking a subcommittee chairmanship in the House Armed Services Committee, of which Rogers was in line to become chair. Multiple representatives criticized Rogers after the confrontation, including Marjorie Taylor Greene, who said it was "out of line" and expected consequences for Rogers, and Tim Burchett, who compared Rogers's actions to being under the influence of alcohol on the House floor, saying "people shouldn't be drinking, especially when you're a redneck, on the House floor". Burchett later retracted his comments about Rogers, saying that they were made out of frustration and that "we're all friends".

During an appearance on Fox News on January 8, 2023, Gaetz said that he had forgiven Rogers for the outburst and that he was looking forward to working with Rogers on the House Armed Services Committee. Gaetz also said he did not think Rogers should be punished for an "animated moment". Later that day, Rogers tweeted a message of reconciliation in response to Gaetz, saying that he regretted losing his temper on the House floor and that he would be happy to continue his working relationship with Gaetz.

On January 9, 2023, multiple media outlets reported that Rogers was planning to step down from the House Steering Committee in the wake of the controversy. Rogers confirmed to Politico that he was considering the decision, but said it had not yet been finalized; 1819 News reported that Rogers "may change his mind". Less than 12 hours later, Rogers said he would not resign from the committee, saying that both Republican and Democratic leaders had urged him not to. Politico called Rogers's reversal an example of the "dishevelment" in the House following McCarthy's election to the speakership.

Following the first indictment of Donald Trump in March 2023, Rogers called the proceedings a "sham" and called for the resignation of district attorney Alvin Bragg.

In April 2023, as chair of the U.S. House Armed Services Committee, Rogers delivered statements urging advancement of the Next Generation Interceptor (NGI) missile program in support of Taiwan against the Chinese Communist Party. 1819 News published a report showing that Lockheed Martin, which is competing for the contract to build the NGI missiles, is Rogers's largest campaign contributor. Rogers has a history of advocating for arms development under Lockheed Martin, including similar comments from January 2023 for Lockheed artillery weapons to be supplied to Ukraine. He never served in the military.

During the October 2023 Speaker of the United States House of Representatives election, after the removal of Kevin McCarthy as speaker, Rogers called those who had supported McCarthy's ouster "traitors" and accused them of "paralyzing" the House of Representatives. Rogers initially refused to support Jim Jordan for Speaker of the House, even after he had been nominated by Republicans for the speakership. Rogers told reporters that he was willing to compromise with House Minority Leader Hakeem Jeffries to nominate a bipartisan moderate speaker instead of Jordan. Rogers' comments were met with scrutiny by conservative colleagues, including Senator Mike Lee from Utah and former U.S. representative Mo Brooks from Alabama. Additionally, members of the Alabama Republican Party state executive committee, including members from the third district, threatened to file a challenge against Rogers' ballot access in the 2024 election. On October 16, 2023, Rogers issued a statement endorsing Jordan for Speaker of the House, reversing his position and establishing his support for Jordan. In the statement, Rogers said that he had "always been a team player" and would support the Republican conference's decision on the speakership.

Upon Trump's 2024 re-election to a non-consecutive term as president, Rogers was reportedly contacted by Trump's transition team as a potential nominee for Secretary of Defense.

In December 2025, while chair of the House Armed Services Committee, Rogers said there was no need to further investigate the second strike by the Donald Trump administration on the survivors of an initial strike on an alleged drug running vessel.

=== Committee assignments ===
For the 119th Congress:

- Committee on Armed Services (chair)
  - As chair, he is ex officio a member of all its Subcommittees.

=== Caucus memberships ===
- Congressional Cement Caucus
- United States Congressional International Conservation Caucus
- Veterinary Medicine Caucus
- Congressional NextGen 9-1-1 Caucus
- Republican Study Committee
- Rare Disease Caucus

== Political positions ==
In 2020, Rogers received a lifetime rating of 86% from the American Conservative Union, one of the most moderate voting records of a Southern Republican that year. He supported an amendment to declare that people retain the right to pray and to recognize their religious beliefs, heritage, and traditions on public property, including schools. He co-sponsored legislation to prohibit the physical desecration of the U.S. flag. Rogers sponsored a bill expressing Congress's continued support for equal access of military recruiters to institutions of higher education.

=== Abortion ===
Rogers is anti-abortion. As of 2020, he has a 100% rating from National Right to Life and a 0% rating from NARAL in 2018 for his abortion-related votes. He opposes banning federal health coverage if abortion is included and opposes using human embryos for stem cell research. Rogers has voted in support of efforts to restrict interstate transport of minors for abortions and allowing partial-birth abortion only if the mother's life is at risk. He also opposes human cloning and signed the No Taxpayer Funding for Abortion Act. He co-sponsored the Sanctity of Human Life Act. Rogers supported the 2022 overturning of Roe v. Wade, calling it "the right decision to protect the innocent lives of unborn children."

=== Civil rights ===
As of 2019, Rogers has a 19% rating regarding civil rights-related legislature from the NAACP.

Rogers voted against the Violence Against Women Act in 2013.

Rogers voted for the Marriage Protection Amendment in 2004. In 2007, he voted against the Employment Non-Discrimination Act. Rogers has a 0/100 rating from the Human Rights Campaign regarding pro-LGBTQ policies.

=== Crime ===
Rogers opposed expanding federal hate crime law to include crimes committed against LGBTQ people. He voted for the Second Chance Act of 2007.

=== Economy ===
Rogers is a signer of Americans for Tax Reform’s Taxpayer Protection Pledge. He voted for the Tax Cuts and Jobs Act of 2017.

During the 2023 United States debt-ceiling crisis, Rogers voted for the Fiscal Responsibility Act of 2023.

=== Foreign affairs ===
In June 2016, Rogers called for the United States withdrawal from the United Nations in the wake of Brexit. On January 3, 2017, Rogers once again called for the U.S. to withdraw from the U.N., introducing the American Sovereignty Act of 2017. The bill still needs House, Senate, and presidential approval. On January 3, 2019, Rogers submitted a similar bill, H.R.204 - American Sovereignty Restoration Act of 2019.

Rogers supported the Biden administration giving Ground Launched Small Diameter Bombs to Ukraine to increase their munitions range, but said the weapons should have been given to Ukraine earlier.

=== Juneteenth ===
In June 2021, Rogers was one of 14 House Republicans to vote against establishing June 19, or Juneteenth, as a federal holiday.

=== Terrorism ===
Rogers voted for the Patriot Act.

=== 2020 presidential election ===
In December 2020, Rogers was one of 126 Republican members of the House of Representatives to sign an amicus brief in support of Texas v. Pennsylvania, a lawsuit filed at the United States Supreme Court contesting the results of the 2020 presidential election. The Supreme Court declined to hear the case on the basis that Texas lacked standing under Article III of the Constitution to challenge the results of an election held by another state. Rogers is one of 147 Republican lawmakers who voted to overturn results in the 2020 presidential election.

== Honors ==
Rogers was made Commander of the Order of the Star of Romania on June 8, 2017. He was the 2025 recipient of the Air Force Historical Foundation's General John W. "Jay" Raymond Award. In 2026, he was awarded the National Defense Industrial Association's Dwight D. Eisenhower Award as well as the Air and Space Force Association's W. Stuart Symington Award.

== Electoral history ==
Electoral history of Mike Rogers
Year	Office	Party	Primary			General			Result	Swing	Ref.
Year	Office	Party	Total	%	P.	Total	%	P.	Result	Swing	Ref.
1994	State Representative	Republican				5,371	56.28%	1st	Won	Gain	
1998	State Representative	Republican				7,733	99.01%	1st	Won	Hold	
2002	U.S. Representative	Republican	28,113	76.13%	1st	91,169	50.35%	1st	Won	Hold	
2004	U.S. Representative	Republican				150,411	61.23%	1st	Won	Hold	
2006	U.S. Representative	Republican				98,257	59.44%	1st	Won	Hold	
2008	U.S. Representative	Republican				142,708	54.10%	1st	Won	Hold	
2010	U.S. Representative	Republican				117,736	59.48%	1st	Won	Hold	
2012	U.S. Representative	Republican				175,306	64.12%	1st	Won	Hold	
2014	U.S. Representative	Republican	50,372	75.89%	1st	103,558	66.12%	1st	Won	Hold	
2016	U.S. Representative	Republican	77,432	75.98%	1st	192,164	66.93%	1st	Won	Hold	
2018	U.S. Representative	Republican				147,770	63.72%	1st	Won	Hold	
2020	U.S. Representative	Republican				217,384	67.46%	1st	Won	Hold	
2022	U.S. Representative	Republican	70,843	81.94%	1st	135,602	71.22%	1st	Won	Hold	
2024	U.S. Representative	Republican	71,292	81.9%	1st	243,848	97.93%	1st	Won	Hold	

== Personal life ==
Rogers is married, with three children. He and his family reside in Weaver and are members of a Baptist Church in nearby Saks.

U.S. House of Representatives
Preceded by Bob Riley	Member of the U.S. House of Representatives from Alabama's 3rd congressional district 2003–present	Incumbent
Preceded by Adam Smith	Chair of the House Armed Services Committee; 2023–present	Incumbent
U.S. order of precedence (ceremonial)
Preceded by Mario Díaz-Balart	United States representatives by seniority 40th	Succeeded by Linda Sánchez
Preceded by Mike Turner	Order of precedence of the United States	Succeeded by Mario Díaz-Balart
