= Daniel Boman =

American politician

Daniel H. Boman

Member of the Alabama House of Representatives from the 16th district
- In office January 12, 2011 – January 12, 2015
- Preceded by: William Thigpen
- Succeeded by: Kyle South

Personal details
- Born: December 7, 1974 (age 51) Tupelo, Mississippi
- Party: Republican (before 2011, 2018–present)
- Other political affiliations: Democratic (2011–2018)
- Spouse: Fallon Boman
- Education: Auburn University; Birmingham School of Law
- Profession: Attorney

Daniel Heath Boman (born December 7, 1974) is an American politician who served as a member of the Alabama House of Representatives, representing the 16th district from 2011 to 2015. Boman was elected as a Republican, but switched to the Democratic Party four months into his tenure. He was defeated by Republican Kyle South in November 2014. Since then, Boman has rejoined the Republican Party.

== Early life, education and law career ==
Daniel Heath Boman was born in Tupelo, Mississippi, on December 7, 1974. He received an A.A. degree from Bevill State Community College, a B.A. degree in psychology from Auburn University, and a J.D. degree from the Birmingham School of Law. He operated his own law practice, the Boman Firm, beginning in 2008, where he worked as a defense attorney.

== Alabama House of Representatives ==
Boman was elected to the state house as a Republican in the massive Republican wave that swept through the state in the 2010 elections. Boman defeated incumbent Democratic representative William Thigpen with 54% of the vote to Thigpen's 46%. At the time of Boman's victory, The Tuscaloosa News described the race as a "stunning upset". During his tenure as state representative, Boman serves on the committees for the Judiciary, Ethics and Campaign Finance, and Tuscaloosa County Legislation. In 2011, Boman voted for an immigration reform law that was called "one of the toughest in the nation" by The Tuscaloosa News, but later said he would not have voted for it in 2014.

Boman attracted national attention in May 2011 when he switched parties and became a Democrat in protest of Republican support for an education bill. Opponents of the bill argued that it was unfair to teachers facing firing or other adverse action. In explaining his decision, Boman said: "During this current session I have seen this legislative body pass bills that I feel adversely affect what my people back home want, need, and deserve...I will never choose the Party over the people again." Boman continued to support education reform as a state representative; in March 2014, he spoke at a rally in support of a pay raise for teachers and bonuses for retired educators.

In March 2012, Boman submitted a satirical resolution in the legislature that made fun of efforts by House Republicans to create jobs, which the Alabama Education Association said would come at expense of funding to schools. The resolution made a joke claim that scientists could soon "grow money on trees". Blaine Galliher, the chair of the House Rules Committee, criticized Boman's resolution as "inappropriate and unprofessional".

In June 2012, redistricting in the Alabama House of Representatives dramatically redrew the 16th district, which Boman represented, to include parts of four different counties. The Alabama Democratic Party accused Republicans on the reapportionment committee of changing the district to "punish" Boman for his party switch. Boman's district was one of the examples brought up in legal challenges against Alabama's 2012 redistricting process, which eventually resulted in the U.S. Supreme Court case Alabama Legislative Black Caucus v. Alabama, which ruled against the state of Alabama.

In 2013, Boman opposed a bill that later passed creating a hotel and convention center in the Gulf State Park, on the grounds that it did not have enough oversight, with Boman stating, "I'm not willing to give the most valuable piece of property in this state to be controlled by so few people". Boman attempted to add an amendment to the bill that would prevent Governor Robert J. Bentley and his family, as well as other former governors and their families, from bidding on the construction of what would become The Lodge at Gulf State Park. However, the amendment did not pass, as other legislators thought attempts to amend the bill would cause it to be sent back to and fail in the Alabama Senate.

In the 2014 election cycle, Boman ran for reelection against Republican nominee Kyle South. During the election, Boman emphasized his work in attaining grants, especially for schools, in the 16th district, as well as his anti-abortion and gun rights stances. Boman and South participated in a debate hosted by the League of Women Voters at their candidate forum in October 2014. Boman was defeated by South in the general election, flipping the seat from Democratic to Republican control in a landslide result of South receiving 75% of the vote to Boman's 25%.

== Other political activities ==
=== 2012 Congressional election ===
While serving as state representative, Boman ran in the Democratic primary for Alabama's 4th congressional district, held by incumbent Republican U.S. Congressman Robert Aderholt in the 2012 congressional elections. Boman defeated Rick Neighbors in the Democratic primary and went on to face Aderholt in the general election.

Prior to the general election, Boman made a post on Facebook that implied Aderholt and his entire congressional staff were gay, though the post did not mention Aderholt by name. Boman initially defended the post, saying that his campaign staff "posed a hypothetical question". At the time of the post, the Alabama Political Reporter called the incident "a new low in politics". Aderholt's campaign spokesman responded by saying "when someone is making a fool of himself, we hate to interrupt". Boman later told AL.com in 2023 that he regretted making the post, calling it a "horrible mistake" and stating that he had called Aderholt's office to apologize "a couple of years later".

Boman lost in the general election to Aderholt, who received 74% of the vote to Boman's 26% in a landslide result.

=== 2018 State Senate election ===
Boman returned to the Republican Party in 2018 and announced his intention to run as a Republican in the primary for the Alabama Senate's sixth district, challenging incumbent Larry Stutts. Boman was removed from the ballot, as the Alabama Republican Party bylaws forbade any candidate who ran against a Republican in the last six years to be on the Republican ballot.

=== 2024 Congressional election ===
In the 2024 United States House of Representatives elections in Alabama, Boman launched a candidacy in the Republican primary for Alabama's 5th congressional district, challenging incumbent representative Dale Strong. Although Boman lives outside of the fifth congressional district, candidates are not required to be residents of their district. Boman faced a ballot challenge from within the Alabama Republican Party for this election, which was adjudicated by the party's Candidate Committee. Boman was officially removed from the ballot in December 2023.

== Legal issues and disbarment ==
After his tenure in the Alabama House of Representatives, Boman was placed on an interim suspension by the Alabama State Bar in 2018. After Boman sued Samsung in the small claims court of Marion County, Alabama, it was revealed that Boman had engaged in a phone call with Samsung customer service in which he used a racial slur and misogynistic language, in addition to making a threat against a Samsung customer service representative. The incident eventually led to Boman being suspended from practicing law for two years in 2019. Boman was initially required to serve only 90 days of the suspension, and was placed on probation for the rest of the suspension period, due to the time served during the interim suspension in 2018. Boman later expressed regret for the incident and apologized, saying that he did not hold racist or sexist views.

However, in January 2020, the Disciplinary Commission of the state bar revoked Boman's probation. In June 2020, Boman was arrested in Lamar County, Alabama, on charges of theft, stemming from allegations that he had used $140,000 from an estate for his own personal use. Boman was fully disbarred that year, which he said was related to the theft case. Boman was indicted in November 2021 and pled not guilty to the charges in April 2022; the case is still pending as of November 2023.

== Personal life ==
Boman is married to his wife Fallon Boman; the couple have three children together. Boman was a resident of Sulligent, Alabama, during his time in the Alabama House of Representatives. Boman resided in Winfield, Alabama, by 2020.
