= Congressional NextGen 9-1-1 Caucus =

Caucus of the United States Congress

The Congressional NextGen 9-1-1 Caucus, a United States Congress caucus, works to improve the 9-1-1 phone system and emergency response systems. The caucus was headed by Senators Richard Burr (R-NC) and Amy Klobuchar (D-MN) and Representatives Dan Bishop (R-NC) and Anna Eshoo (D-CA) in 2022.

== History ==
The caucus was formed on February 25, 2003, by Senator Conrad Burns (R-MT), Senator Hillary Clinton (D-NY), Congressman John Shimkus (R-IL) and Congresswoman Eshoo. The original name of the caucus was the "Congressional E9-1-1 Caucus". It was formed to "educate lawmakers, constituents and communities about the importance of citizen-activated emergency response systems".

On February 16, 2011, the caucus was registered as an official organization for the 112th Congress. The name was changed to the NextGen 9-1-1 Caucus.

== Members ==
Congressional NextGen 9-1-1 Caucus in the 118th United States Congress

The NG9-1-1 Institute lists the following caucus members for the 118th Congress:

=== House members ===
- Robert Aderholt (R-AL)
- Gus Bilirakis (R-FL)
- Vern Buchanan (R-FL)
- Michael Burgess (R-TX)
- James Comer (R-KY)
- Joe Courtney (D-CT)
- Rosa DeLauro (D-CT)
- Suzan DelBene (D-WA)
- Lloyd Doggett (D-TX)
- Anna Eshoo (D-CA), Co-Chair
- Brian Fitzpatrick (R-PA)
- Kay Granger (R-TX)
- Raúl Grijalva (D-AZ)
- Brett Guthrie (R-KY)
- Jim Himes (D-CT)
- Richard Hudson (R-NC), (Co-Chair)
- Jared Huffman (D-CA)
- Glenn Ivey (D-MD)
- Sheila Jackson Lee (D-TX)
- Derek Kilmer (D-WA)
- Rick Larsen (D-WA)
- John B. Larson (D-CT)
- Zoe Lofgren (D-CA)
- Doris Matsui (D-CA)
- Jim McGovern (D-MA)
- Patrick McHenry (R-NC)
- Kweisi Mfume (D-MD)
- Frank Pallone (D-NJ)
- Brittany Pettersen (D-CO)
- Jamie Raskin (D-MD)
- Mike Rogers (R-AL)
- Dutch Ruppersberger (D-MD)
- John Rutherford (R-FL)
- John Sarbanes (D-MD)
- Mike Simpson (R-ID)
- Mike Thompson (D-CA)
- Norma Torres (D-CA)
- David Trone (D-MD)
- Marc Veasey (D-TX)
- Tim Walberg (R-MI)
- Jennifer Wexton (D-VA)
- Frederica Wilson (D-FL)
- Joe Wilson (R-SC)

=== Senate members ===
- Marsha Blackburn (R-TN)
- Cory Booker (D-NJ)
- Richard Durbin (D-IL)
- Dianne Feinstein (D-CA)
- Mazie Hirono (D-HI)
- John Hoeven (R-ND)
- Amy Klobuchar (D-MN), Co-Chair
- Patty Murray (D-WA)
- Gary Peters (D-MI)
- Brian Schatz (D-HI)
- Chuck Schumer (D-NY)
- Debbie Stabenow (D-MI)
- Chris Van Hollen (D-MD)

== Activity ==
In 2012, Co-Chairs Shimkus and Eshoo announced that a caucus-supported bill, the Next Generation 9-1-1 Advancement Act (HR 2629), was included in the payroll tax holiday legislation that was passed by Congress. The bill, as passed in the larger tax bill, provided matching grants to organizations to support 9-1-1- call centers being able to receive voice, text, image, and video data.

In February 2014, the Federal Communications Commission (FCC) supported a proposal that would create standards requiring wireless providers to give information about a caller's location to public safety personnel. The caucus, through Co-Chair Shimkus, supported the proposal.

== NG9-1-1- Institute ==
The NG9-1-1 Institute is a non-profit organization located at 300 New Jersey Ave. NW Suite 900 Washington, DC 20001, whose mission it is to provide support (administrative and policy-related) to the caucus. Every year, the institute gives awards to people and groups for contributions to improving 9-1-1 services, and sponsors 911-related educational events.
