= Bryan Brinyark =

American politician

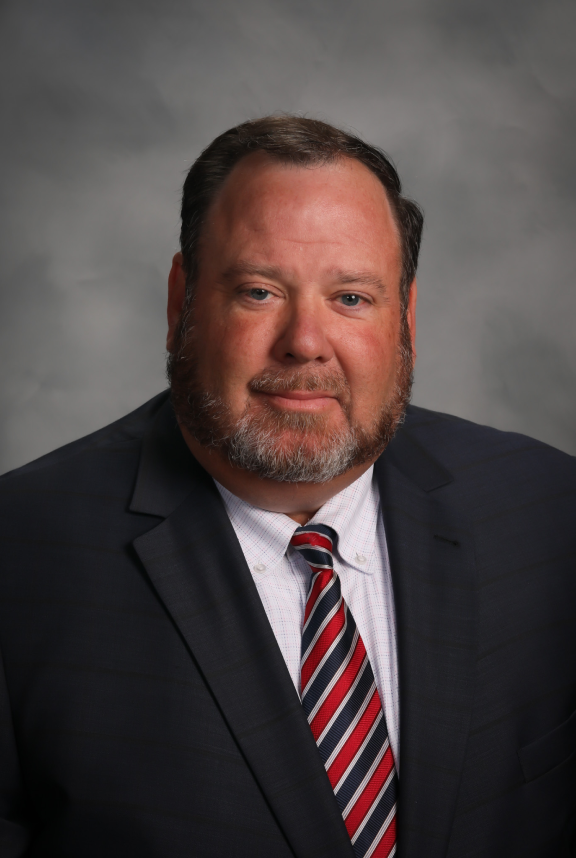

Member of the Alabama House of Representatives from the 16th district
- Incumbent
- Assumed office January 10, 2024
- Preceded by: Kyle South

Personal details
- Born: 1968 (age 57–58) Tuscaloosa, Alabama, U.S.
- Party: Republican
- Education: University of Alabama (BA, JD)
- Occupation: Attorney, municipal court judge, farmer

Bryan Brinyark (born 1968) is an American attorney, judge, and politician who serves in the Alabama House of Representatives, representing its 16th district since 2024. A member of the Republican Party, his district includes all of Fayette County, as well as parts of Tuscaloosa and Jefferson in the western part of the state.

== Education and early career ==
A native of Tuscaloosa, Alabama, Brinyark graduated from Central High School and went on to attend the University of Alabama, where he attained a B.A. in advertising in 1990, before receiving a J.D. from the University of Alabama School of Law in 1993.

Entering law practice, Brinyark specialized in business, estate and divorce law. Brinyark served as a municipal judge in Brent and Woodstock before becoming the municipal judge of Centreville in 2005. Brinyark also served as a judge for the city of Tuscaloosa, where he presided over cases such as a solicitation charge against Tuscaloosa city councilor James Cunningham, of which Cunningham was found guilty.

In 2014, Brinyark founded the law firm Brinyark & Frederick, which focuses on divorce law, in Northport. Brinyark also chaired the Board of Tuscaloosa Shoot Sports Inc. and was the baseball president of Northside Park in Tuscaloosa.

== Alabama House of Representatives ==
Following the resignation of Kyle South in 2023, the seat for the Alabama House of Representatives's 16th district became open, and a special election was held. A first-time candidate for the Republican Party, Brinyark qualified to run for the seat in July 2023. Brinyark's main opponent was Fayette County commissioner Brad Cox, against whom he advanced to a runoff election in the Republican primary. Brinyark received the endorsement of the Business Council of Alabama, while Cox had been endorsed by the Alabama Education Association. Cox won the first round of voting in September 2023 by 15 votes, but Brinyark defeated Cox with 52% of the runoff vote in October 2023.

Brinyark advanced to the general election in January 2024 against Democratic nominee John Underwood, another member of the Fayette County commission. Prior to the general election, Brinyark also received the endorsement of the Alabama Farmers Federation. Brinyark won the special election in a landslide with 83% of the vote to Underwood's 17%.

Following his election, Brinyark said his priorities would include the expansion of Highway 43, among other infrastructure projects. Brinyark is also an advocate of school choice, and said he would support programs such as school vouchers.

== Personal life ==
Brinyark resides in Windham Springs, Alabama, where he has run a small farm since the 2000s, and is the father of five adult children. He attends the Northport Church of Christ.
