= Kyle South =

American politician

Member of the Alabama House of Representatives from the 16th district
- In office January 12, 2015 – June 30, 2023
- Preceded by: Daniel Boman
- Succeeded by: Bryan Brinyark

Personal details
- Born: Stephen Kyle South; August 29, 1981 (age 44) Fayette, Alabama, U.S.
- Party: Republican

Stephen Kyle South (born August 29, 1981) is an American politician who served in the Alabama House of Representatives from 2015 to 2023, representing its 16th district.

In April 2023, South was selected as president and CEO of the Chamber of Commerce of West Alabama, effective July 1, 2023. He resigned from his seat in the Alabama Legislature to take the position after the end of the 2023 legislative session.
