= Martha Roby =

American politician (born 1976)

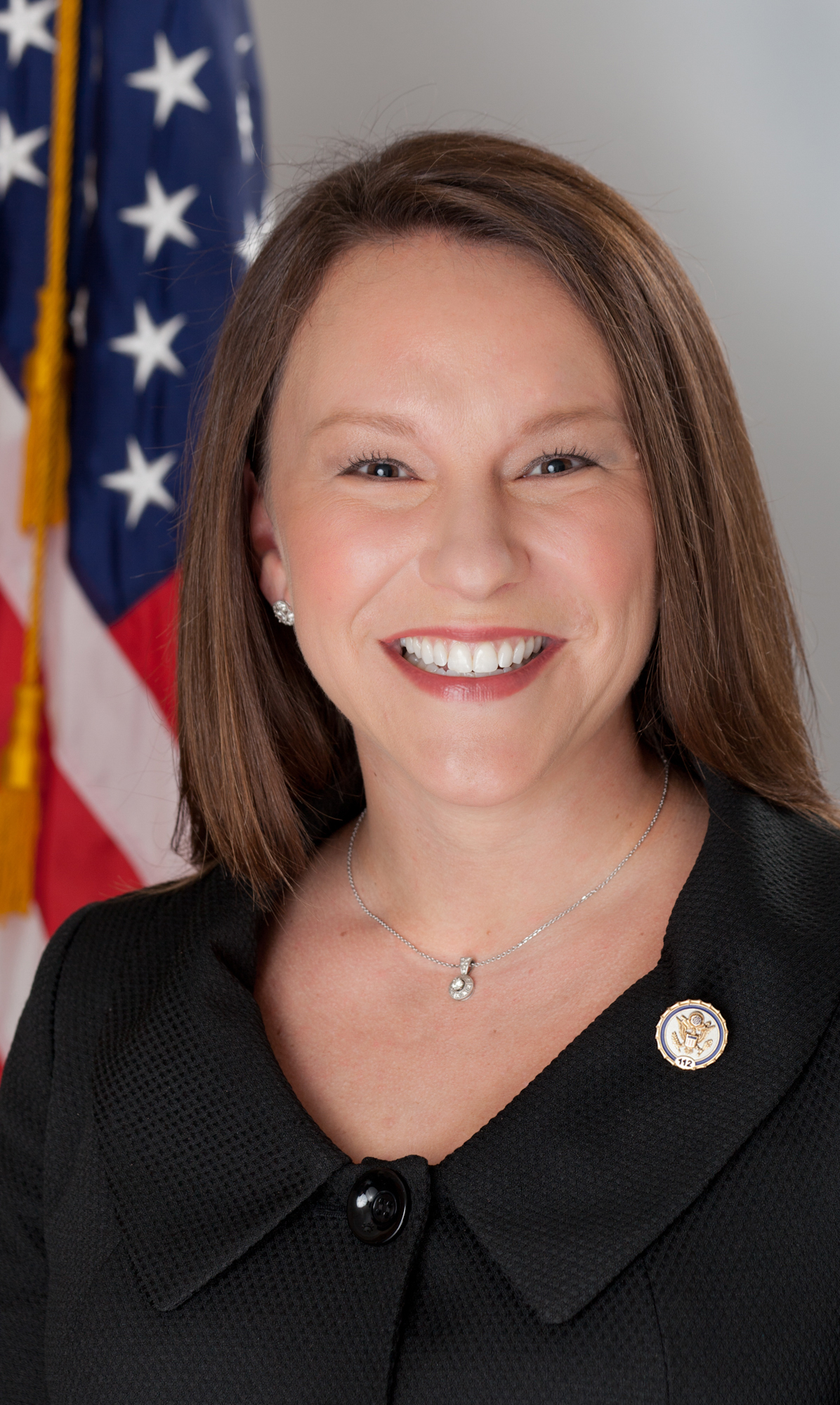
- Official portrait, 2011

Member of the U.S. House of Representatives from Alabama's 2nd district
- In office January 3, 2011 – January 3, 2021
- Preceded by: Bobby Bright
- Succeeded by: Barry Moore

Personal details
- Born: Martha Kehres Dubina; July 26, 1976 (age 50) Montgomery, Alabama, U.S.
- Party: Republican
- Spouse: Riley Roby
- Children: 2
- Relatives: Joel Fredrick Dubina (father)
- Education: New York University (BM); Samford University (JD)
- Roby's voice Recorded October 4, 2011

Martha Kehres Roby (/ˈroʊbi/ ROH-bee; née Dubina; born July 26, 1976) is an American lawyer and politician who served as the U.S. representative for Alabama's 2nd congressional district from 2011 to 2021. A member of the Republican Party, she defeated the incumbent Democratic U.S. representative Bobby Bright in 2010. That year, Roby and Terri Sewell became the first women elected to Congress from Alabama in regular elections. On July 26, 2019, Roby announced she would retire from Congress at the end of her fifth term, which ended in 2021.

== Early life, education, and legal career ==
Martha Dubina was born in Montgomery, Alabama, to Joel Dubina, a judge on the United States Court of Appeals for the Eleventh Circuit. She attended New York University, where she received a Bachelor of Music degree. She then entered the Samford University Cumberland School of Law at Birmingham, Alabama, receiving her J.D. in 2001.

Before entering politics, she worked at the law firm of Copeland, Franco.

== Montgomery City Council ==
=== Elections ===
Roby was elected to the Montgomery City Council in 2003, defeating a total of five opponents, and winning 54.88% of the votes cast in her district.

=== Tenure ===
In her first term on the council, Roby joined three other council members and then mayor Bobby Bright in opposing the building of a shopping mall in East Montgomery. She also opposed privatizing the disposal of household garbage, supported a 10 cent cigarette tax increase, and argued for a state sales tax holiday.

== U.S. House of Representatives ==
=== Elections ===
==== 2010 ====
Roby challenged incumbent Democratic U.S. congressman and former Montgomery mayor Bobby Bright in Alabama's 2nd congressional district. In the four-candidate Republican primary, Roby ranked first with 49% of the vote, narrowly missing the 50% threshold needed to win the nomination and avoid a run-off. Rick Barber ranked second with 29% of the vote. In the run-off election, Roby defeated him 60–40%.

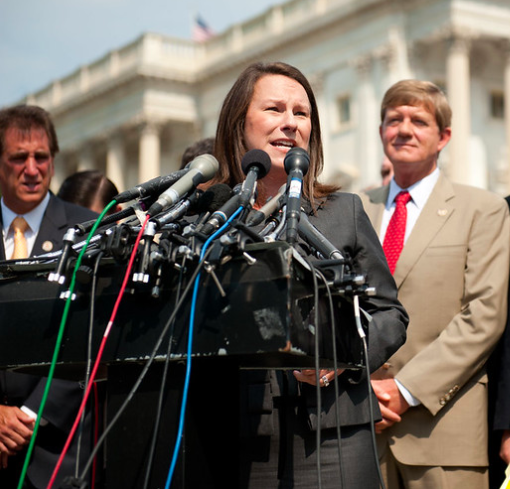
Martha Roby speaking at a GOP press conference in 2011

The 2010 race was one of the most expensive races in the district's history. Roby spent a total of $1,240,275.64 on her 2010 election. Most of her funds came from large individual contributions. Her top contributor was Jim Wilson and Associates, a Montgomery real estate developer, who contributed $25,300. Leadership PACs contributed a total of $106,010.

Roby defeated Bright by 51–49%, a difference of 4,780 votes. Roby won 7 of the district's 16 counties: Autauga, Elmore, Covington, Coffee, Geneva, Dale, and Houston Counties. Bright won Montgomery County with 59% of the vote.

==== 2012 ====
In her run for re-election to her seat, she received the endorsements of 36 mayors in Alabama, the Alabama Farmers Federation, and Susan B. Anthony List.

The 2nd district had long been a conservative district, and Roby won a second term, defeating Democrat Therese Ford 64–36%. She won 11 of the district's 15 counties. She lost her home county of Montgomery by a margin of 53–47%.

==== 2014 ====
Roby won the election with 67.34% of the vote, defeating Democratic nominee Erick Wright.

==== 2016 ====
On March 1, 2016, Roby won the Republican primary with 64% of the vote. She won the general election with 48.8% of the vote. Democrat Nathan Mathis received 40.5% of the vote and write-in candidates received 10.7% of the vote.

==== 2018 ====
Roby defeated Bobby Bright, the incumbent she first defeated in 2010 and who had since switched to the Republican Party, in the Republican primary and subsequent run-off. She received 68% of the vote in the run-off. In the general election, she defeated Democratic nominee Tabitha Isner with 61.4% of the vote.

=== Committee assignments ===
- United States House Committee on Appropriations
  - United States House Appropriations Subcommittee on Commerce, Justice, and Science
  - United States House Appropriations Subcommittee on Military Construction and Veterans Affairs
  - United States House Appropriations Subcommittee on State and Foreign Operations
- United States House Committee on the Judiciary
  - United States House Judiciary Subcommittee on Courts, Intellectual Property and the Internet (Ranking Member)
- House Select Committee on the Events Surrounding the 2012 Terrorist Attack in Benghazi (2014-2016)

=== Tenure ===
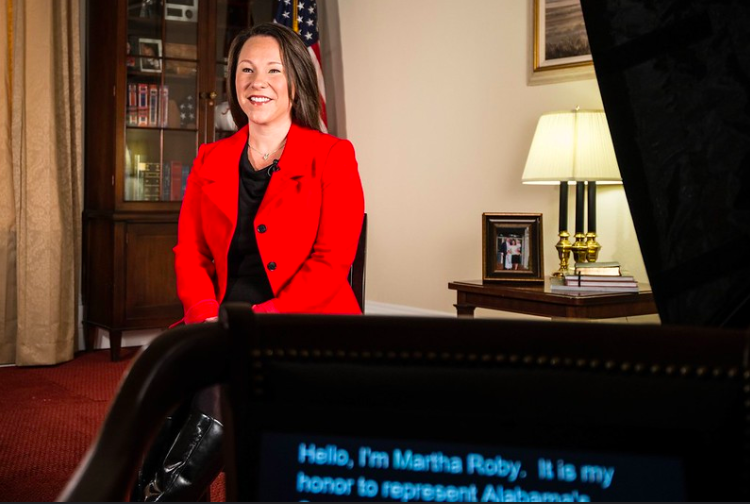
Martha Roby presenting the Weekly Republican Address in 2013.

In December 2011, Roby voted in support of H.R. 10, the "Regulations From the Executive in Need of Scrutiny Act," which would have required congressional approval for any "major regulations" issued by the executive branch but, unlike the 1996 Congressional Review Act, would not require the president's signature or override of a probable presidential veto.

Roby voted in September 2013 to cut $39 billion from the food stamp program. In 2011, approximately 41,000 households in Roby's congressional district received food stamps.

In February 2017, she voted against a resolution that would have directed the House to request 10 years of Trump's tax returns, which would then have been reviewed by the House Ways and Means Committee in a closed session. In 2017, Roby also co-sponsored a bipartisan bill to require sexual harassment and anti-discrimination training for all House members, employees, staff and unpaid personnel. The bill passed the House. She does not support the ability for lawmakers to use tax dollars to settle sexual harassment claims.

Roby helped secure over $3.6 million to expand broadband internet access in rural Autauga County, Alabama.

In July 2019, Roby said she would retire from Congress at the end of her term. In December 2019, Roby voted to oppose the first impeachment of Donald Trump in her position on the House Judiciary Committee. During the vote, Roby's son, George, sat on her lap. Regarding impeachment, Roby said that Americans "should feel cheated" and that the Democrats conducted "an incomplete and inadequate pursuit of the truth."

== Political positions ==
As of January 2019, Roby has voted with her party in 92.4% of votes so far in the 116th United States Congress and voted in line with President Trump's position in 93.8% of the votes. She has a 58% rating, regarding her conservative votes, from Heritage Action.

Vote Smart, a non-profit, non-partisan research organization that collects and distributes information on candidates for public office in the United States, "researched presidential and congressional candidates' public records to determine candidates' likely responses on certain key issues." According to Vote Smart's 2016 analysis, Roby generally supports abortion restrictions, opposes an income tax increase, opposes federal spending as a means of promoting economic growth, supports lowering taxes as a means of promoting economic growth, opposes requiring states to adopt federal education standards, supports building the Keystone Pipeline, supports government funding for the development of renewable energy, opposes the federal regulation of greenhouse gas emissions, opposes gun-control legislation, supports repealing the Affordable Care Act, supports requiring immigrants who are unlawfully present to return to their country of origin before they are eligible for citizenship, opposes same-sex marriage, supports increased American intervention in Iraq and Syria beyond air support, and opposes allowing individuals to divert a portion of their Social Security taxes into personal retirement accounts.

=== Abortion ===
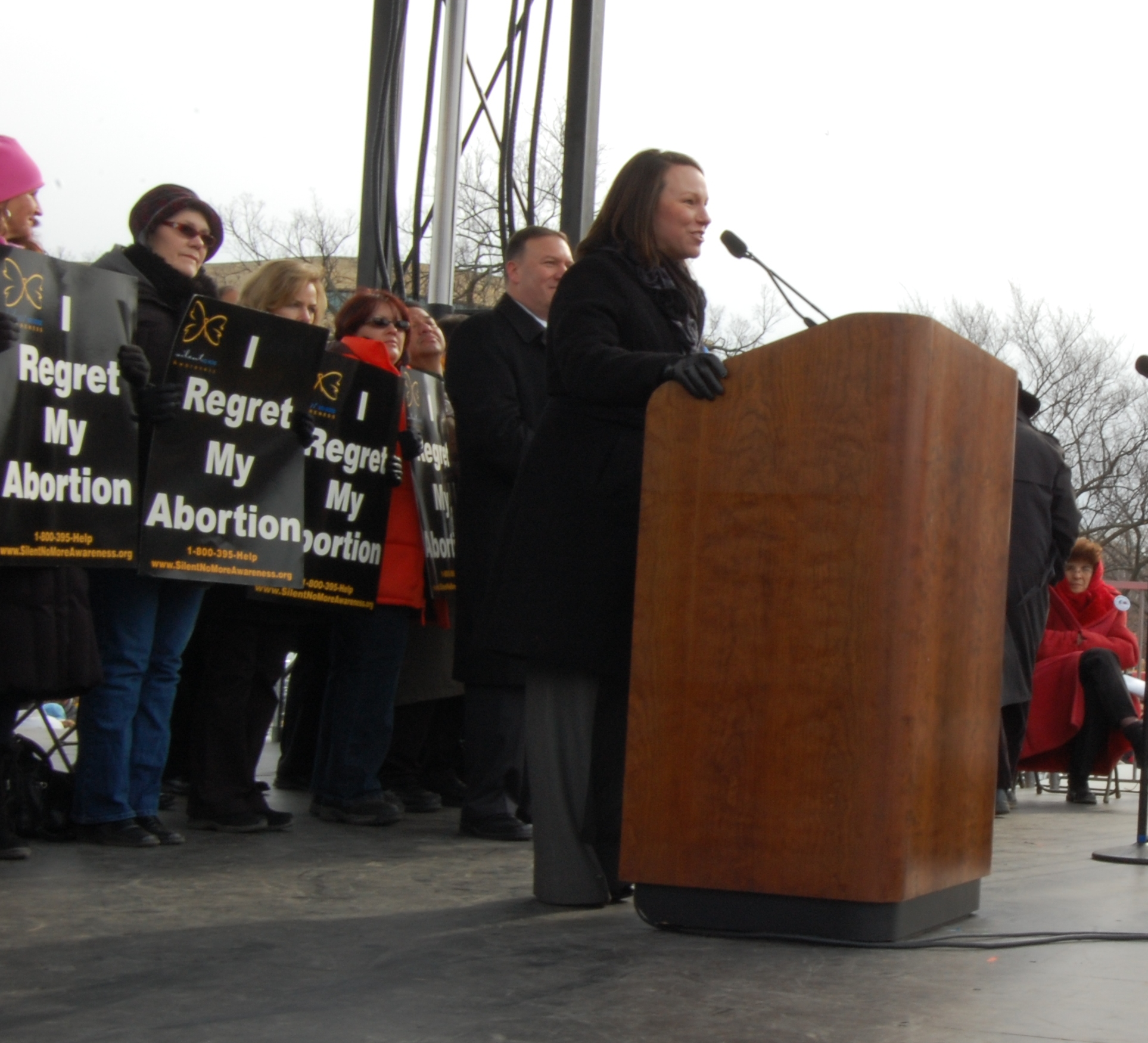
Martha Roby speaking at the 2011 March for Life Rally in Washington, D.C.

Roby describes herself as "unapologetically pro-life." As of 2019, Roby has a 0% rating from Planned Parenthood.

She supports the Hyde Amendment and opposes abortion providers having access to Title X money. She opposes sex-selective and race-selective abortions. She supports efforts to include "preborn human person[s]" in the Fourteenth Amendment to the United States Constitution and co-sponsored a bill to do so. In 2011, she signed a prohibition on funding the United Nations Population Fund. She co-sponsored the Sanctity of Human Life Act.

=== Budget ===
During the 2010 election, Roby promised to reduce government spending and that she would support a Balanced Budget Agreement, support a line-item veto, support ending the current earmark process, oppose government bailouts and takeovers of private companies, and support the requirement of budgets to be submitted for Social Security and Medicare.

=== Cannabis ===
Roby has a "D" rating from marijuana legalization advocacy group the National Organization for the Reform of Marijuana Laws (NORML) and a score of zero out of six from the National Cannabis Industry Association regarding her voting record on cannabis-related matters. Roby opposes the legalization of medical, recreational, and veterans' use of marijuana. She also opposes hemp legalization.

=== Civil rights ===
As of 2018, Roby has a 3% rating from American Civil Liberties Union and a 9% rating from the NAACP regarding her pro-civil rights voting record.

When the Obama administration issued guidance in 2016 that transgender students in public schools be allowed to choose which bathrooms to use, Roby said the administration had "lost their minds." The Human Rights Campaign gives Roby a rating of zero for her lack of support for pro-LGBTQ rights policies.

During her time in the Alabama legislature, Roby suggested the possibility of impeachment for then federal judge Mark Fuller, who was charged and pleaded guilty for spousal abuse. Roby voted to oppose the Violence Against Women Act because she says portions of the law are unconstitutional. These portions include the ability for non-Native Americans to prosecute Native Americans in tribal court for domestic violence charges. She says "It takes away potential due process for people who are not a member of the tribe."

=== Defense ===
Roby pledged to maintain defense spending at least 4% of Gross Domestic Product and that she would support missile defense programs in 2010.

=== Economy ===
In 2010, she pledged to abolish the Internal Revenue Service (IRS). As of 2017, Roby has a 0% rating with the American Federation of State, County and Municipal Employees and a 10% rating from the AFL–CIO for her anti-worker voting record. She has an 89% rating from the U.S. Chamber of Commerce for her support of pro-business policies. She opposes increasing the federal minimum wage and supports abolishing the federal minimum wage, saying "The best thing the federal government can do to ensure increasing wages is to get out of the way," claiming it stifles growth.

=== Education ===
When asked if there was one federal department or agency that she could eliminate, she said she would abolish the Department of Education but keep federal grants to states intact. Roby supports voluntary prayer in all schools.

=== Energy and environment ===
In 2010, Roby opposed reduced dependence on foreign oil and cap and trade. The environmental advocacy group the League of Conservation Voters gives her a lifetime score of 4%. Roby opposes the Environmental Protection Agency from regulating greenhouse gases. She supports efforts to drill for oil on the outer continental shelf. She also opposes increasing taxes to fight climate change.

As of 2019, Roby has a rating of 9 out of 100 by the Humane Society of the United States's Legislative Fund for her voting record on animal protection issues.

=== Governance ===
During the 2010 election, Roby said she would vote to require that all legislation be posted online for 72 hours before debate and require that every piece of legislation begin with an explanation of its constitutionality.

=== Gun laws ===
Roby is a gun owner.

=== Health care ===
She also opposes federal funding being used to fund research using human embryos.

During Roby's 2010 campaign, she promised to support ending pre-existing conditions as exclusion from receiving health insurance benefits and to vote to defund health care reform. In 2010, Roby expressed support for Paul Ryan's "Roadmap for America's Future", which would privatize portions of Medicare. She has stated publicly that she opposes privatization of Medicare and Social Security.

Roby has repeatedly voted to repeal the Patient Protection and Affordable Care Act (Obamacare). On May 4, 2017, she voted in favor of repealing the Patient Protection and Affordable Care Act (Obamacare) and passing the American Health Care Act. In stating her support for the American Health Care Act (AHCA), Roby said the Affordable Care Act was a "failed law" and that the AHCA put in place a "patient-centered system that lowers costs, increases choices, and isn't run by the government". The U.S. House voted on the legislation before the bill had been scored by the Congressional Budget Office.

=== Immigration ===
Roby opposes amnesty for illegal immigrants. She supports Trump's efforts to build a border wall.

=== Social security ===
In 2013, Roby received a score of 0% from the Alliance for Retired Americans for supporting privatization and market-based reforms. She opposes efforts to raise the retirement age for social security, to reduce in Social Security benefits and to increase in payroll taxes for Social Security benefits.

=== Tax reform ===
Roby supports tax reform, including the abolition of the estate tax. In the 112th United States Congress, Roby signed the Americans for Tax Reform Taxpayer Protection Pledge. In 2010, Roby signed a pledge sponsored by Americans for Prosperity to not vote for any global warming legislation that would raise taxes. Roby voted for the Tax Cuts and Jobs Act of 2017. She said that more businesses will stay in the U.S. due to the tax cuts and that she is "proud" of the legislation which she says "will help families keep their own money."

=== Technology ===
Roby supported the Cyber Intelligence Sharing and Protection Act (CISPA). She also voted in support of terminating funding of National Public Radio.

=== Terrorism ===
After the 2016 Orlando nightclub shooting, Roby said,

"I'm horrified and heartbroken by the terrorist attack in Orlando. I'm praying for the victims and their families, and I ask others to send prayers of comfort and healing for everyone affected. This is the worst terrorist attack on American soil since September 11, 2001. Though reports on the killer's ties to specific groups still coming in, we must fully dispel the notion that our struggle against radical Islamic terrorism is solely an overseas fight. That fight is here in the Homeland, and all American leaders must come to grips with it."

=== Donald Trump ===
In October 2016, Roby withdrew her presidential endorsement of Donald Trump, saying, "Donald Trump's behavior makes him unacceptable as a candidate for president, and I won't vote for him". Following Trump's election, Roby became more supportive of him and attempted to make amends, subsequently gaining his endorsement for her reelection campaign. She earned Trump's endorsement in the primary reportedly after House majority leader Kevin McCarthy encouraged Trump to endorse her.

In October 2019, Roby voted for a resolution condemning Trump for removing U.S. military forces from Syria, which had protected greatly endangered Kurdish civilians, as well as fighters and their military resistance to the Islamic State in Syria (ISIS), enabling attacks upon them by Turkish forces and the Assad government in Syria. She voted in opposition of the impeachment of Trump, saying "the bar to impeach a sitting president of the United States has not been met."

=== War and peace ===
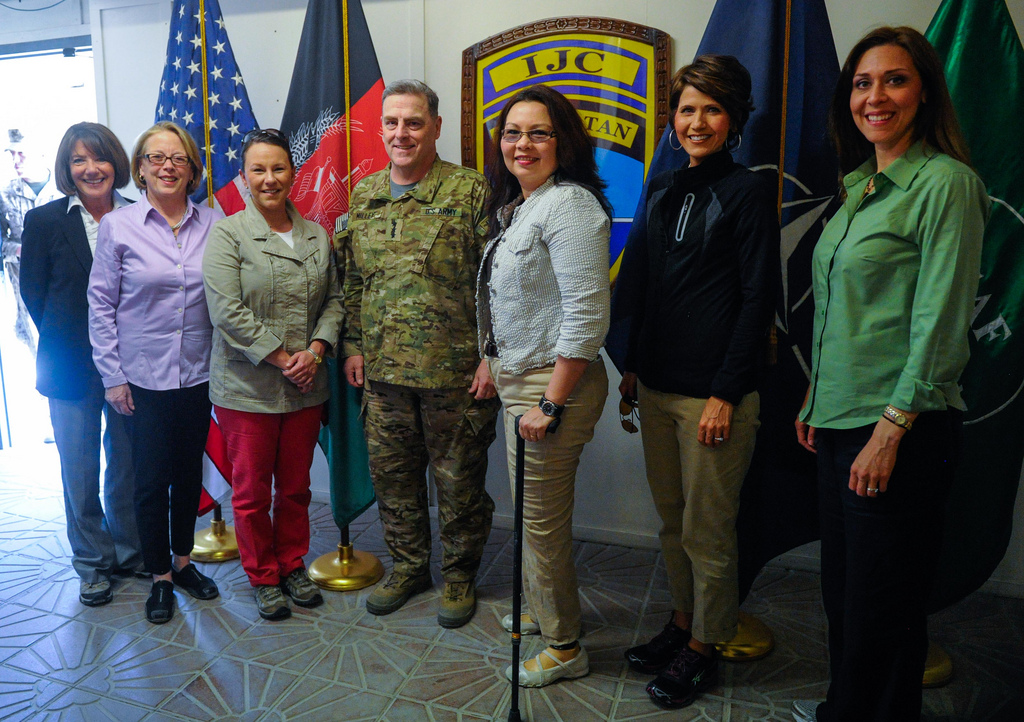
Martha Roby with Susan Davis, Niki Tsongas, Tammy Duckworth, Jaime Herrera Beutler and Kristi Noem in Afghanistan in 2013

Roby voted yes on banning armed forces in Libya without congressional approval. She opposed the removal of armed forces in Afghanistan in 2011.

== Electoral history ==
Alabama's 2nd congressional district Republican primary, 2010
Party	Candidate	Votes	%
Republican	Martha Roby	36,295	48.6
Republican	Rick Barber	21,313	28.5
Republican	Stephanie Bell	13,797	18.5
Republican	John Beau McKinney III	3,349	4/5
Total votes		74,754	100.0

Alabama's 2nd congressional district Republican primary runoff election, 2010
Party	Candidate	Votes	%
Republican	Martha Roby	39,169	60.0
Republican	Rick Barber	26,091	40.0
Total votes		65,260	100.0

Alabama's 2nd congressional district election, 2010
Party	Candidate	Votes	%
Republican	Martha Roby	111,645	51.1
Democratic	Bobby Bright (incumbent)	106,865	48.8
Write-in		518	0.2
Total votes		219,028	100.0
Republican gain from Democratic			

Alabama's 2nd congressional district election, 2012
Party	Candidate	Votes	%
Republican	Martha Roby (incumbent)	180,591	63.6
Democratic	Therese Ford	103,092	36.3
Write-in		270	0.1
Total votes		283,953	100.0
Republican hold			

Alabama's 2nd congressional district election, 2014
Party	Candidate	Votes	%
Republican	Martha Roby (incumbent)	113,103	67.3
Democratic	Erick Wright	54,692	32.3
Write-in		157	0.1
Total votes		167,952	100.0
Republican hold			

Alabama's 2nd congressional district Republican primary, 2016
Party	Candidate	Votes	%
Republican	Martha Roby (incumbent)	78,689	66.4
Republican	Becky Gerritson	33,015	32.6
Republican	Bob Rogers	6,856	5.8
Total votes		118,560	100.0

Alabama's 2nd congressional district election, 2016
Party	Candidate	Votes	%
Republican	Martha Roby (incumbent)	134,886	48.8
Democratic	Nathan Mathis	112,089	40.5
Write-in		29,609	10.7
Total votes		276,854	100.0
Republican hold			

Alabama's 2nd congressional district Republican primary, 2018
Party	Candidate	Votes	%
Republican	Martha Roby (incumbent)	36,708	39.0
Republican	Bobby Bright	26,481	28.1
Republican	Barry Moore	18,177	19.3
Republican	Rich Hobson	7,052	7.5
Republican	Tommy Amason	5,763	6.1
Total votes		94,181	100.0

Alabama's 2nd congressional district Republican primary runoff
Party	Candidate	Votes	%
Republican	Martha Roby (incumbent)	48,331	67.9
Republican	Bobby Bright	22,795	32.1
Total votes		71,126	100.0

Alabama's 2nd congressional district election, 2018
Party	Candidate	Votes	%
Republican	Martha Roby (incumbent)	138,879	61.4
Democratic	Tabitha Isner	86,931	38.4
Write-in		420	0.2
Republican hold			

== See also ==
- Women in the United States House of Representatives

U.S. House of Representatives
Preceded by Bobby Bright	Member of the U.S. House of Representatives from Alabama's 2nd congressional district 2011–2021	Succeeded by Barry Moore
U.S. order of precedence (ceremonial)
Preceded by Jo Bonner as Former U.S. Representative	Order of precedence of the United States as Former U.S. Representative	Succeeded by James A. Barcia as Former U.S. Representative
