= Robert Aderholt =

American politician and attorney (born 1965)

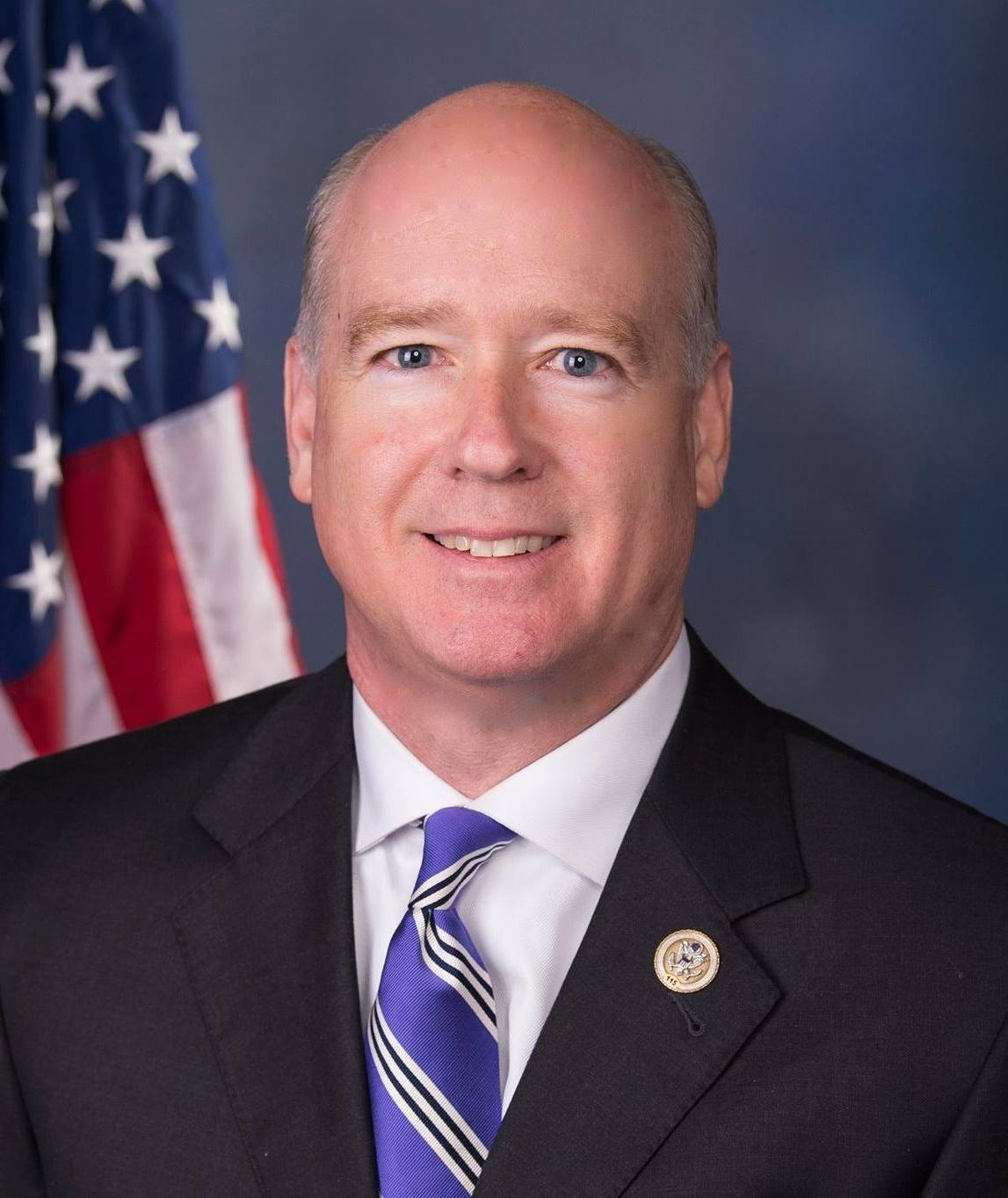
- Official portrait, 2018

Member of the U.S. House of Representatives from Alabama's 4th district
- Incumbent
- Assumed office January 3, 1997
- Preceded by: Tom Bevill

Personal details
- Born: Robert Brown Aderholt; July 22, 1965 (age 61) Haleyville, Alabama, U.S.
- Party: Republican
- Spouse: Caroline McDonald (m. 1994)
- Children: 2
- Education: University of North Alabama (attended); Birmingham-Southern College (BA); Samford University (JD)
- Website: House website Campaign website
- Aderholt's voice Aderholt honoring James Stanford, an Alabamian marine who died during the 1954 USS Bennington explosion and fire. Recorded July 27, 2017

Robert Brown Aderholt (/ˈædərˌhoʊlt/ AD-ər-hohlt; born July 22, 1965) is an American politician and attorney from Alabama. A socially conservative member of the Republican Party and a member of the Tea Party Caucus, he is currently serving as a U.S. representative, representing Alabama's 4th congressional district since 1997. The district includes most of Tuscaloosa County north of the Black Warrior River, as well as Birmingham's far northern suburbs in Walker County and the southern suburbs of Huntsville and Decatur.

Representing the most Republican district in the country, with an index rating of R+33, he became the dean of Alabama's congressional delegation following Senator Richard Shelby's retirement at the end of the 117th Congress.

Aderholt currently sits on the House Committee on Appropriations, playing a role in allocating federal funds.

== Early life and education ==
Aderholt was born in Haleyville, Alabama, to Mary Frances Brown and Bobby Ray Aderholt. Aderholt's father, a part-time minister for a small group of Congregational churches in northwest Alabama, was a circuit judge for more than 30 years. He attended the University of North Alabama and then Birmingham-Southern College, from which he graduated with a degree in history and political science. During college, Aderholt was a member of Kappa Alpha Order. Aderholt received his J.D. from the Samford University Cumberland School of Law and practiced law after graduation.

== Career ==
In 1992, Aderholt was appointed Haleyville municipal judge. The same year, he was a delegate to the Republican National Convention. In 1995, he became the top aide to Governor Fob James. He won the 1996 Republican primary in the race to succeed 15-term Democratic incumbent Tom Bevill.

As the Republican nominee, Aderholt faced a considerable challenge against State Senator Bob Wilson Jr., who called himself a Democrat "in the Tom Bevill tradition". This was a seriously contested race, receiving considerable national coverage and significant support from the Republican Party. Newt Gingrich personally visited the district during the campaign. Aderholt won, 50%–48%, becoming only the second Republican to represent the district since Reconstruction. Two years later, he was reelected over Tom Bevill, Jr., his predecessor's son. The first Republican to win the seat had been Jim Martin, who was swept into office in what was then the 7th District during the 1964 wave that delivered the state's electoral votes to Barry Goldwater. After his first win, Aderholt has never faced another contest nearly that close, and has been reelected nine times. He ran unopposed in 2004, 2010, 2014, and 2016. His increasing margins reflected the growing Republican trend in this part of Alabama.

Aderholt is associated with the Fellowship Foundation, which paid for his trip to Romania in 2017 to promote "traditional family values". Over the course of 16 years, Aderholt traveled to 18 countries on the Fellowship's behalf.

== U.S. House of Representatives ==
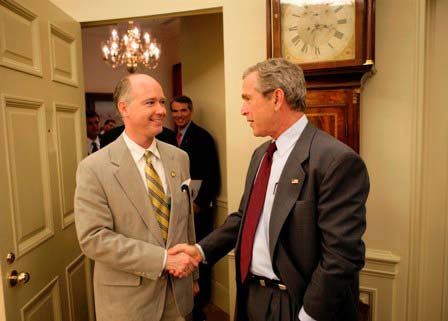
Aderholt greeting President George W. Bush in 2005

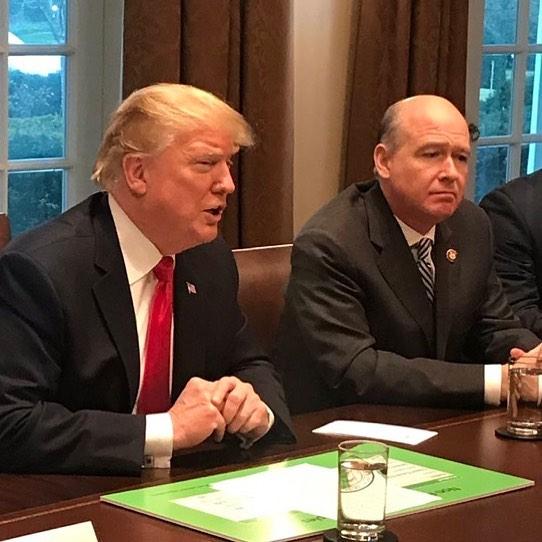
Aderholt with President Donald Trump in 2019

=== Tenure ===
Aderholt is one of 147 Republican lawmakers who voted to overturn results in the 2020 presidential election. He was at the Capitol to certify the election results when it was attacked. During the attack, he tweeted a prayer to God to "guide & protect this nation." In a video message, he later said that some of the attackers "crossed the line". Even after the attack, he supported overturning the election. Aderholt later opposed impeaching Trump for the second time.

In February 2021, Aderholt voted against the American Rescue Plan, claiming that his opposition was because half the bill's funding went to "unrelated liberal policies" and that the bill "has nothing to do with COVID-19 relief".

As of January 2023, Aderholt had voted in line with Joe Biden's stated position 9% of the time.

In January 2023, Aderholt announced that he had secured $13.8 million in funding for 14 infrastructure projects in his district, including broadband expansion, roadways and access to medical care. Although announced during the 118th Congress, the funds were from the previous House session.

In February 2023, CoinDesk reported that Aderholt is one of three members of Alabama's congressional delegation who received money from FTX, the defunct cryptocurrency exchange, alongside Katie Britt and Gary Palmer. His office did not respond to a CoinDesk inquiry about what had been done with the funds.

Aderholt voted to provide Israel with support following the October 7 attacks.

=== Committee assignments ===
For the 118th Congress:

- Committee on Appropriations
  - Subcommittee on Commerce, Justice, Science, and Related Agencies
  - Subcommittee on Defense
  - Subcommittee on Labor, Health and Human Services, Education, and Related Agencies (Chair)

=== Caucuses ===
- Republican Study Committee
- Tea Party Caucus
- Congressional Caucus on Turkey and Turkish Americans
- Congressional NextGen 9-1-1 Caucus
- United States Congressional International Conservation Caucus
- Congressional Coalition on Adoption (co-chair)

=== Bills sponsored ===
Sponsor HR 3808: Interstate Recognition of Notarizations Act of 2010, 111th Congress

Representatives Bruce Braley, Mike Castle, and Artur Davis co-sponsored the bill.

H.R. 3808 Interstate Recognition of Notarizations Act of 2010 – To require any federal or state court to recognize any notarization made by a notary public licensed by a state other than the state where the court is located when such notarization occurs in or affects interstate commerce.

April 27, 2010: This bill passed the House of Representatives by voice vote. A record of each representative's position was not kept.

September 27, 2010: This bill passed the Senate by unanimous consent. A record of each senator's position was not kept.

October 8, 2010: vetoed by President.

H.R. 2017 Continuing Appropriations Act, 2012

May 26, 2011: Introduced

June 2, 2011: Passed House with amendments

September 26, 2011: Passed Senate with amendments

September 30, 2011: Became Public Law 112-33

== Political positions ==
The American Conservative Union's center for legislative accountability gave Aderholt a 83% lifetime conservative rating and the progressive PAC Americans for Democratic Action gave him a 5% liberal quotient in 2019.

=== Abortion ===
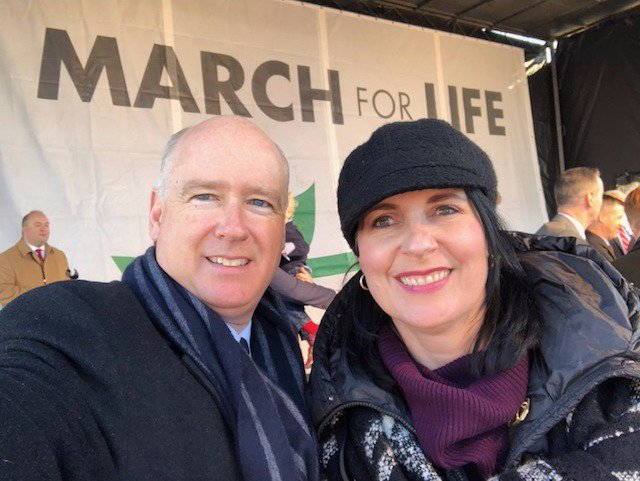
Robert and Caroline Aderholt at the 2018 March for Life in Washington, D.C.

During the March for Life in Washington on January 22, 2010, Aderholt said, "The issue of abortion and the sanctity of life is something that I feel strongly about and I encourage my colleagues to look for ways to curb and stop abortions in the United States, while compassionately educating on this important issue." Aderholt supported the 2022 overturning of Roe v. Wade and called it a "watershed moment for life".

=== Budget and economy ===
Aderholt opposes reducing the defense budget to close the American deficit, and in May 2012 said "cuts to defense budgets – the federal government's primary Constitutional responsibility – shouldn't be the relief valve for uncontrolled domestic program spending".

During the 2023 United States debt-ceiling crisis, Aderholt voted for the Fiscal Responsibility Act of 2023. Aderholt called the debt-ceiling deal between Kevin McCarthy and President Joe Biden "a step in the right direction", though he also said it was "not perfect".

=== Civil rights ===
Aderholt opposes same-sex marriage. Aderholt condemned the Supreme Court decision in Obergefell v. Hodges, which held that same-sex marriage bans violated the US constitution. He has received high ratings from the Family Research Council, the Traditional Values Coalition, and the American Family Association. In 2013, the Human Rights Campaign gave him a score of 0 on its Congressional Scorecard.

=== Environment ===
During the 111th Congress, Aderholt voted for Steve Scalise's amendment (Note: H. Amendment: H.Amdt. 448 to H.R. 367) to "require that Congress be allowed to vote on any executive regulation that would impose any tax, price, or levy upon carbon emissions... effectively prevents the executive branch from levying any form of carbon tax without Congressional approval. Since a carbon tax would be tremendously destructive to the economy as a whole, this measure would hopefully make such a tax unlikely to pass." Aderholt opposed regulations on greenhouse gas emissions, and in December 2008 helped write a letter to the U.S. Environmental Protection Agency that read, "I am opposed to any attempt to impose greenhouse gas regulations under the Clean Air Act on the agricultural industry."

=== Gun policy ===
Aderholt supports easy access to firearms. He has been repeatedly endorsed by the NRA Political Victory Fund, and received $2,000 in 2010.

In the wake of the 2016 Orlando nightclub shooting, Aderholt called it a terrorist attack and said, "we do not have the luxury of debating the political correctness of 'radical Islam'", adding that there was a need to "hunt down those who would do us harm". He opposed the media and President Obama using the shooting to "push any type of political agenda relating to gun control" and called on the White House and Congress to "protect the homeland".

=== Health care ===
In 2019, Aderholt introduced a bill to raise the minimum age to purchase tobacco to 21.

=== Regulatory reform ===
In December 2011, Aderholt voted in support of H.R. 10, the Regulations from the Executive in Need of Scrutiny Act, which would have required congressional approval for any "major regulations" issued by the executive branch but, unlike the 1996 Congressional Review Act, would not require the president's signature or override of a probable presidential veto.

=== Tax policy ===
Aderholt is a signer of Americans for Tax Reform's Taxpayer Protection Pledge. He voted for the Tax Cuts and Jobs Act of 2017, saying it would "give back more money to Alabama taxpayers" and "does the right thing". He cited the raising of the child tax credit, changes to the state and local tax deductions, and said, "more than 80% the people in the 4th District of Alabama will receive a tax cut." Aderholt also said that more businesses will stay in the U.S. due to a lower corporate tax rate and therefore the act is a "jobs bill".

=== Texas v. Pennsylvania ===
In December 2020, Aderholt was one of 126 Republican members of the House of Representatives to sign an amicus brief in support of Texas v. Pennsylvania, a lawsuit filed at the United States Supreme Court contesting the results of the 2020 presidential election, in which Joe Biden defeated incumbent Donald Trump. The Supreme Court declined to hear the case on the basis that Texas lacked standing under Article III of the Constitution to challenge the results of an election held by another state.

=== Defense ===
In September 2021, Aderholt was among 75 House Republicans to vote against the National Defense Authorization Act of 2022, which contains a provision that would require women to be drafted.

In 2026, Aderholt voted in favor of FY27 NDAA, to “revitalize the defense industrial base” and “secure our supply chains.”

== Electoral history ==
Electoral history of Robert Aderholt
Year	Office	Party	Primary			General			Result	Swing	Ref.
Year	Office	Party	Total	%	P.	Total	%	P.	Result	Swing	Ref.
1996	U.S. Representative	Republican	10,410	48.83%	1st	102,741	49.94%	1st	Won	Gain	
1998	U.S. Representative	Republican				106,297	56.43%	1st	Won	Hold	
2000	U.S. Representative	Republican				140,009	60.89%	1st	Won	Hold	
2002	U.S. Representative	Republican				139,705	87.01%	1st	Won	Hold	
2004	U.S. Representative	Republican				191,110	74.83%	1st	Won	Hold	
2006	U.S. Representative	Republican				128,484	70.18%	1st	Won	Hold	
2008	U.S. Representative	Republican				196,741	74.76%	1st	Won	Hold	
2010	U.S. Representative	Republican				167,714	98.82%	1st	Won	Hold	
2012	U.S. Representative	Republican				199,071	73.97%	1st	Won	Hold	
2014	U.S. Representative	Republican				132,831	98.57%	1st	Won	Hold	
2016	U.S. Representative	Republican	86,660	81.18%	1st	235,925	98.53%	1st	Won	Hold	
2018	U.S. Representative	Republican	93,959	81.54%	1st	184,255	79.77%	1st	Won	Hold	
2020	U.S. Representative	Republican				261,553	82.24%	1st	Won	Hold	
2022	U.S. Representative	Republican				164,655	84.12%	1st	Won	Hold	
2024	U.S. Representative	Republican	79,083	79.8%	1st	274,498	98.79%	1st	Won	Hold	

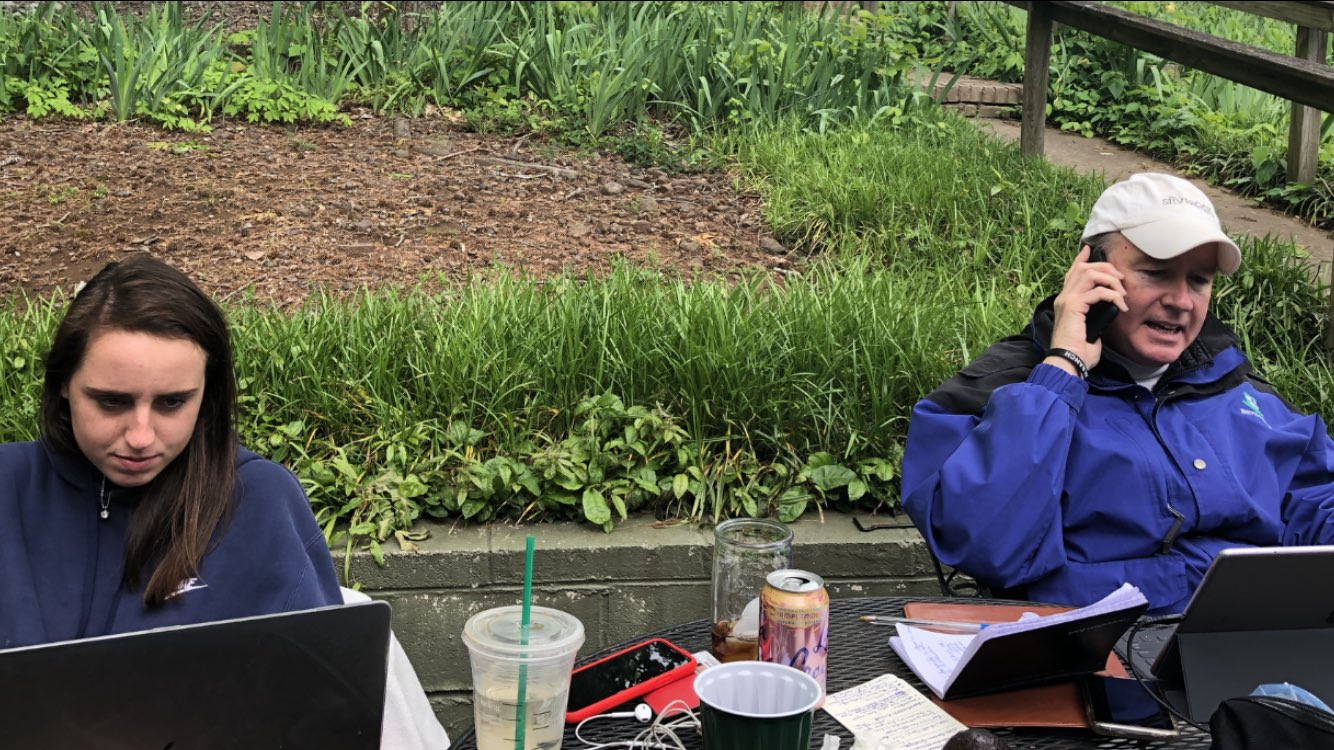
Aderholt with his daughter, Mary Elliott, while sheltering-in-place during the COVID-19 pandemic in Alabama.

== Personal life ==
Aderholt is married to Caroline McDonald. Her father, Albert, served in the Alabama State Senate and was Alabama Commissioner of Agriculture and Industries. They have two children.

On December 4, 2020, Aderholt announced that he had tested positive for COVID-19 after going into quarantine eight days earlier after his wife had tested positive.

Aderholt is a Congregationalist.

== Honors ==
Aderholt has been awarded the following foreign honors:

- Commander of the Order of the Star of Romania, Romania (June 8, 2017)
- Serving Brother of the Most Venerable Order of the Hospital of St John of Jerusalem, United Kingdom (September 21, 2017)

== Citations ==
U.S. House of Representatives
Preceded by Tom Bevill	Member of the U.S. House of Representatives from Alabama's 4th congressional district 1997–present	Incumbent
U.S. order of precedence (ceremonial)
Preceded by Zoe Lofgren	United States representatives by seniority 20th	Succeeded by Danny Davis
Preceded by Danny Davis	Order of precedence of the United States	Succeeded by Brad Sherman
