= 2012 United States House of Representatives elections in Alabama =

- November 6, 2012

All 7 Alabama seats to the United States House of Representatives
	Majority party	Minority party
Party	Republican	Democratic
Last election	6	1
Seats won	6	1
Seat change	Steady	Steady
Popular vote	1,233,624	693,498
Percentage	63.80%	35.87%
Swing	▼3.06%	▲5.24%

Republican
50–60%
60–70%
70–80%
80–90%
>90%
Democratic
50–60%
60–70%
70–80%
80–90%

The 2012 United States House of Representatives elections in Alabama were held on Tuesday, November 6, 2012, to elect the seven U.S. representatives from the state, one from each of the state's seven congressional districts. The elections coincided with the elections of other federal and state offices, including a quadrennial presidential election. Primary elections were held on March 13, 2012; runoff elections were held on April 24.

== Redistricting ==
A redistricting bill was passed by the Alabama House of Representatives and Senate on June 2, 2011, and signed into law by Governor Robert Bentley on June 8. To comply with the 1965 Voting Rights Act, the map received approval from the U.S. Department of Justice or a federal court before it could be enacted; the Department of Justice approved the map on November 21, 2011.

== Overview ==
The table below shows the total number and percentage of votes, as well as the number of seats gained and lost by each political party in the election for the United States House of Representatives in Alabama.

2012 United States House of Representatives elections in Alabama
Party	Votes	Percentage	Seats	+/–
Republican	1,233,624	63.8%	6	-
Democratic	693,498	35.9%	1	-
Write-in	6,508	0.3%	0	-
Totals	1,933,630	100.0%	7	—

== District 1 ==
2012 Alabama's 1st congressional district election
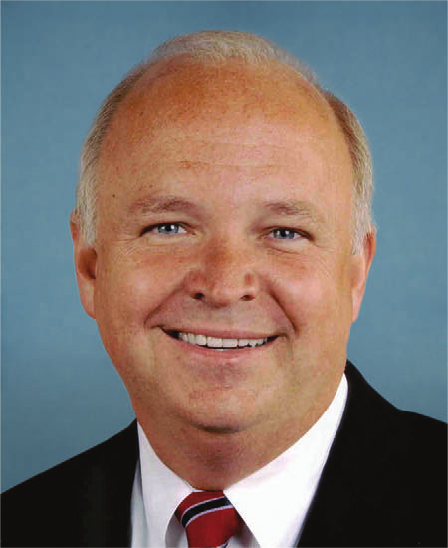
Nominee	Jo Bonner
Party	Republican
Popular vote	196,374
Percentage	97.9%
U.S. Representative before election
Jo Bonner
Republican
Elected U.S. Representative
Jo Bonner
Republican

The redrawn 1st district remains based in Mobile and continues to include the entirety of the state's coast. Republican Jo Bonner, who had represented the 1st district since 2003, sought re-election.

=== Republican primary ===
==== Candidates ====
===== Nominee =====
- Jo Bonner, incumbent U.S. representative

===== Eliminated in primary =====
- Peter Gounares, real estate broker and candidate for this seat in 2010
- Pete Riehm, real estate agent
- Dean Young, businessman and conservative activist

==== Primary results ====
Republican primary results
Party	Candidate	Votes	%
Republican	Jo Bonner (incumbent)	48,481	55.5
Republican	Dean Young	21,216	24.3
Republican	Pete Riehm	13,744	15.8
Republican	Peter Gounares	3,828	4.4
Total votes		87,269	100.0

=== Democratic primary ===
No Democrats qualified to seek the nomination.

Clint Moser, who had planned to run against Bonner as an independent, did not do so.

=== General election ===
==== Endorsements ====
Jo Bonner (R)

Organizations

- Campaign for Working Families
- National Right to Life Committee
- NRA Political Victory Fund
- United States Chamber of Commerce

==== Predictions ====
Source	Ranking	As of
The Cook Political Report	Safe R	November 5, 2012
Rothenberg	Safe R	November 2, 2012
Roll Call	Safe R	November 4, 2012
Sabato's Crystal Ball	Safe R	November 5, 2012
NY Times	Safe R	November 4, 2012
RCP	Safe R	November 4, 2012
The Hill	Safe R	November 4, 2012

==== Results ====
Bonner easily won re-election on November 6, 2012.

Alabama's 1st congressional district, 2012
Party	Candidate	Votes	%
Republican	Jo Bonner (incumbent)	196,374	97.9
n/a	Write-ins	4,302	2.1
Total votes		200,676	100.0
Republican hold			

== District 2 ==
2012 Alabama's 2nd congressional district election
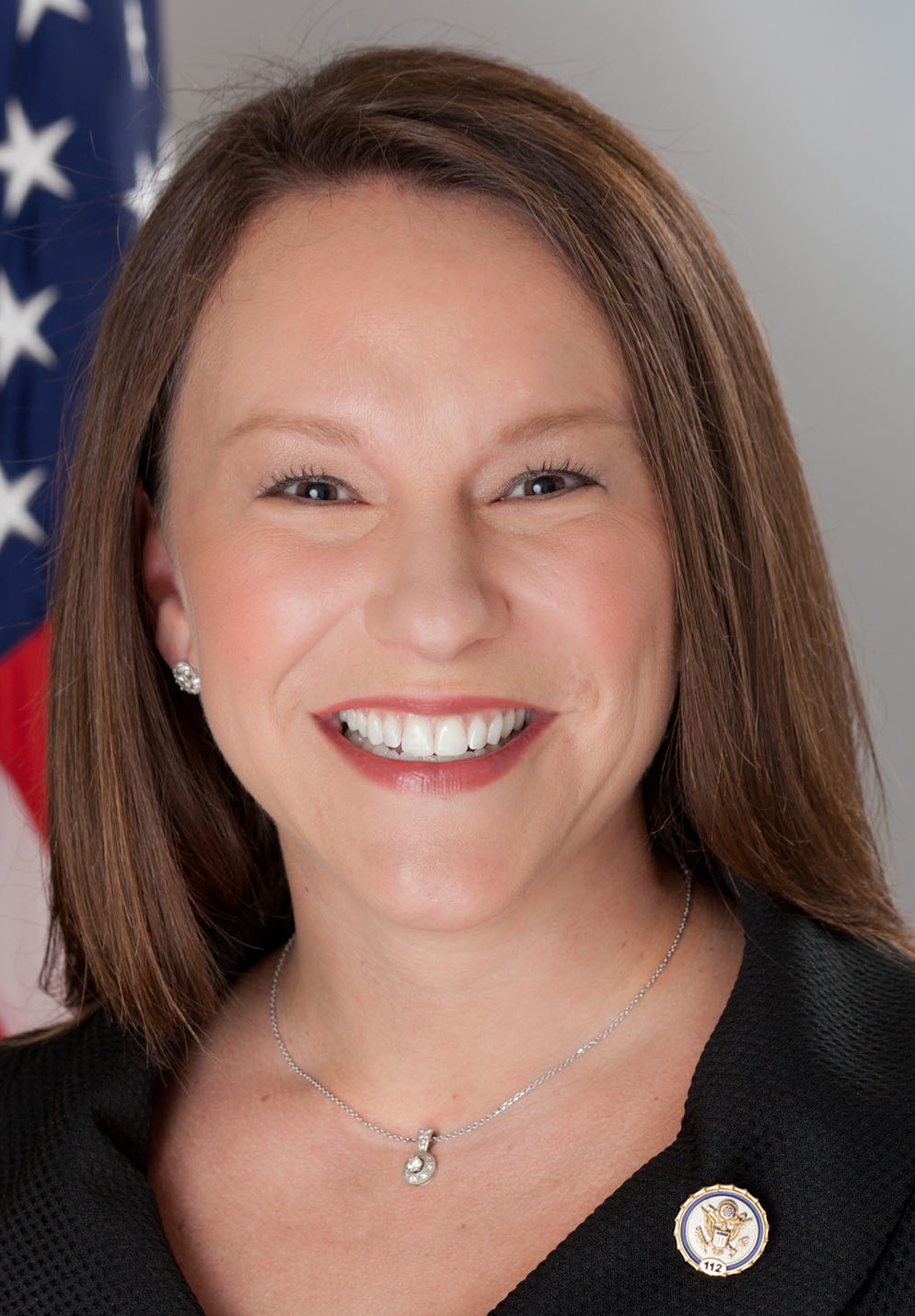

Nominee	Martha Roby	Therese Ford
Party	Republican	Democratic
Popular vote	180,591	103,092
Percentage	63.7%	36.2%
- County results Roby: 50–60% 60–70% 70–80% 80–90% Ford: 50–60% 70–80%
U.S. Representative before election
Martha Roby
Republican
Elected U.S. Representative
Martha Roby
Republican

The redrawn 2nd district is based in the suburbs of Montgomery and covers the southeast of the state. Republican Martha Roby, who had represented the 2nd district since January 2011, sought re-election in 2012.

=== Republican primary ===
==== Candidates ====
===== Nominee =====
- Martha Roby, incumbent U.S. representative

=== Democratic primary ===
==== Candidates ====
===== Nominee =====
- Therese Ford, former deputy attorney general of Alabama

===== Declined =====
- Bobby Bright, former U.S. Representative

=== General election ===
==== Endorsements ====
Martha Roby (R)

Organizations

- Campaign for Working Families
- Maggie's List
- National Right to Life Committee
- NRA Political Victory Fund
- Susan B. Anthony List
- United States Chamber of Commerce
Therese Ford (D)

Labor unions

- AFL-CIO

==== Predictions ====
Source	Ranking	As of
The Cook Political Report	Safe R	November 5, 2012
Rothenberg	Safe R	November 2, 2012
Roll Call	Safe R	November 4, 2012
Sabato's Crystal Ball	Safe R	November 5, 2012
NY Times	Safe R	November 4, 2012
RCP	Safe R	November 4, 2012
The Hill	Safe R	November 4, 2012

==== Results ====
Alabama's 2nd congressional district, 2012
Party	Candidate	Votes	%
Republican	Martha Roby (incumbent)	180,591	63.7
Democratic	Therese Ford	103,092	36.2
n/a	Write-ins	270	0.1
Total votes		283,953	100.0
Republican hold			

== District 3 ==
2012 Alabama's 3rd congressional district election
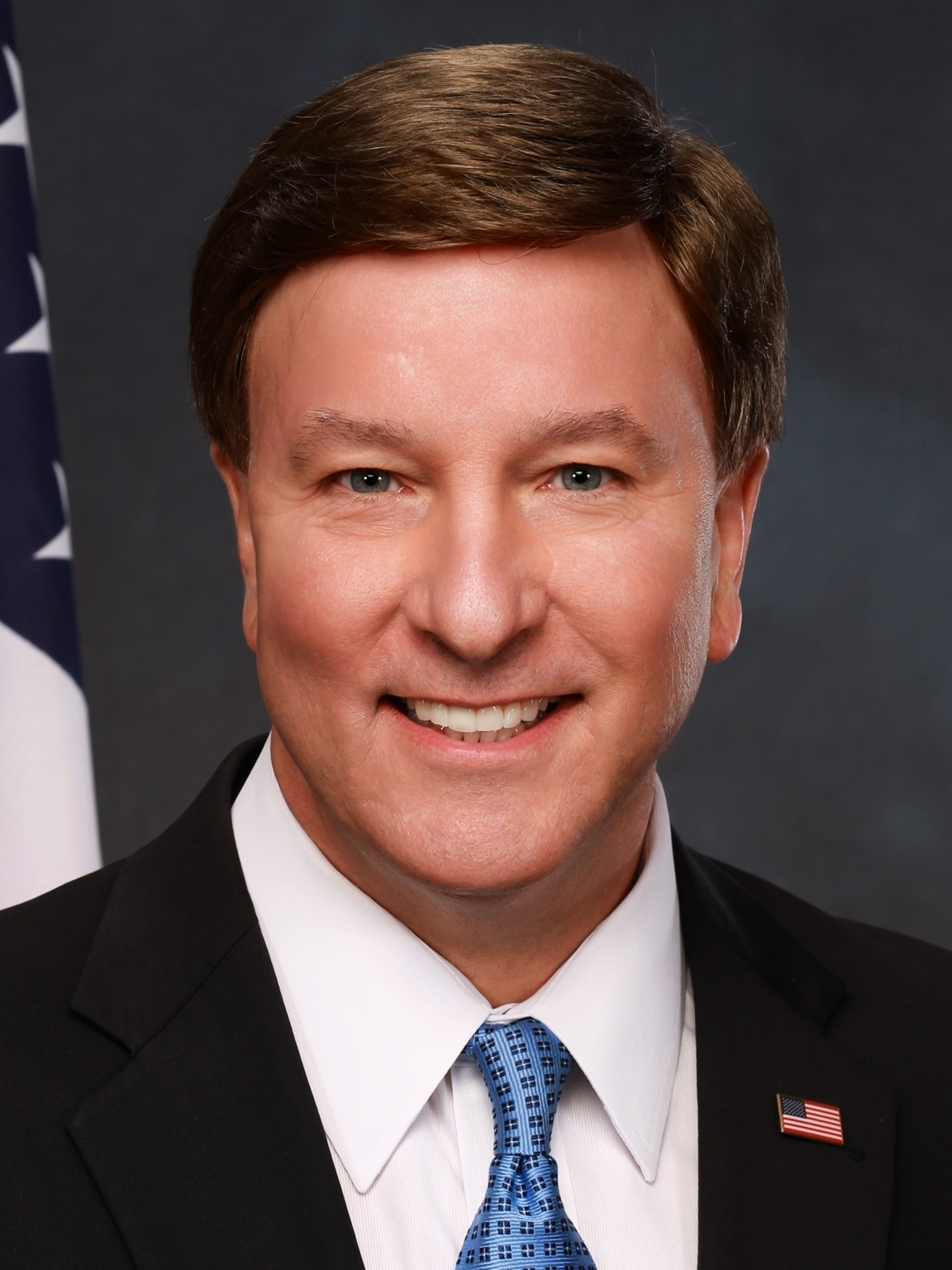

Nominee	Mike Rogers	John Andrew Harris
Party	Republican	Democratic
Popular vote	175,306	98,141
Percentage	64.0%	35.8%
- County results Rogers: 50–60% 60–70% 70–80% 80–90% Harris: 50–60% 80–90%
U.S. Representative before election
Mike Rogers
Republican
Elected U.S. Representative
Mike Rogers
Republican

The redrawn 3rd district is more favorable to Republicans than its previous incarnation. Republican Mike Rogers, who had represented the 3rd district since 2003, sought re-election.

=== Republican primary ===
==== Candidates ====
===== Nominee =====
- Mike Rogers, incumbent U.S. representative

=== Democratic primary ===
==== Candidates ====
===== Nominee =====
- John Andrew Harris, child nutrition program worker for Auburn City Schools

=== General election ===
==== Endorsements ====
Mike Rogers (R)

Organizations

- Campaign for Working Families
- National Right to Life Committee
- NRA Political Victory Fund
- United States Chamber of Commerce
John Harris (D)

Labor unions

- AFL-CIO

Organizations

- National Education Association

==== Predictions ====
Source	Ranking	As of
The Cook Political Report	Safe R	November 5, 2012
Rothenberg	Safe R	November 2, 2012
Roll Call	Safe R	November 4, 2012
Sabato's Crystal Ball	Safe R	November 5, 2012
NY Times	Safe R	November 4, 2012
RCP	Safe R	November 4, 2012
The Hill	Safe R	November 4, 2012

==== Results ====
Alabama's 3rd congressional district, 2012
Party	Candidate	Votes	%
Republican	Mike Rogers (incumbent)	175,306	64.0
Democratic	John Andrew Harris	98,141	35.8
n/a	Write-ins	483	0.2
Total votes		273,390	100.0
Republican hold			

== District 4 ==
2012 Alabama's 4th congressional district election
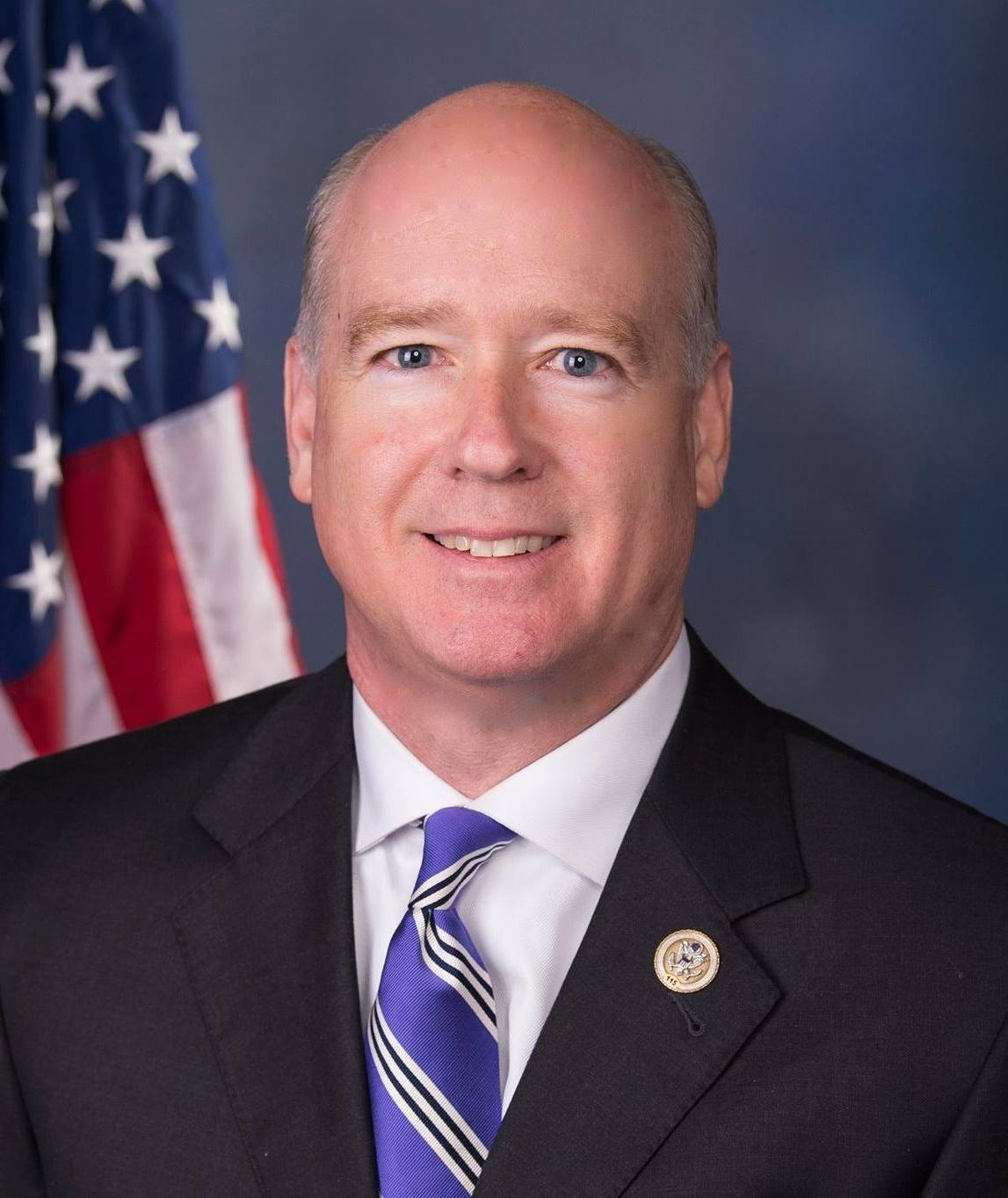

Nominee	Robert Aderholt	Daniel Boman
Party	Republican	Democratic
Popular vote	199,071	69,706
Percentage	74.0%	25.9%
- County results Aderholt: 50–60% 60–70% 70–80% 80–90%
U.S. Representative before election
Robert Aderholt
Republican
Elected U.S. Representative
Robert Aderholt
Republican

The northern part of Tuscaloosa County was added to the 4th district during redistricting, while most of Blount County was removed. Republican Robert Aderholt, who had represented the 4th district since 1997, sought re-election.

=== Republican primary ===
==== Candidates ====
===== Nominee =====
- Robert Aderholt, incumbent U.S. representative

=== Democratic primary ===
==== Candidates ====
===== Nominee =====
- Daniel Boman, state representative

===== Eliminated in primary =====
- Rick Neighbors, former plant supervisor

==== Primary results ====
Democratic primary results
Party	Candidate	Votes	%
Democratic	Daniel Boman	10,969	51.4
Democratic	Rick Neighbors	10,353	48.6
Total votes		21,322	100.0

=== General election ===
==== Endorsements ====
Robert Aderholt (R)

Organizations

- Campaign for Working Families
- National Right to Life Committee
- NRA Political Victory Fund
- United States Chamber of Commerce
Daniel Boman (D)

Labor unions

- AFL-CIO

Organizations

- National Education Association

==== Predictions ====
Source	Ranking	As of
The Cook Political Report	Safe R	November 5, 2012
Rothenberg	Safe R	November 2, 2012
Roll Call	Safe R	November 4, 2012
Sabato's Crystal Ball	Safe R	November 5, 2012
NY Times	Safe R	November 4, 2012
RCP	Safe R	November 4, 2012
The Hill	Safe R	November 4, 2012

==== Results ====
Alabama's 4th congressional district, 2012
Party	Candidate	Votes	%
Republican	Robert Aderholt (incumbent)	199,071	74.0
Democratic	Daniel Boman	69,706	25.9
n/a	Write-ins	341	0.1
Total votes		269,118	100.0
Republican hold			

== District 5 ==
2012 Alabama's 5th congressional district election
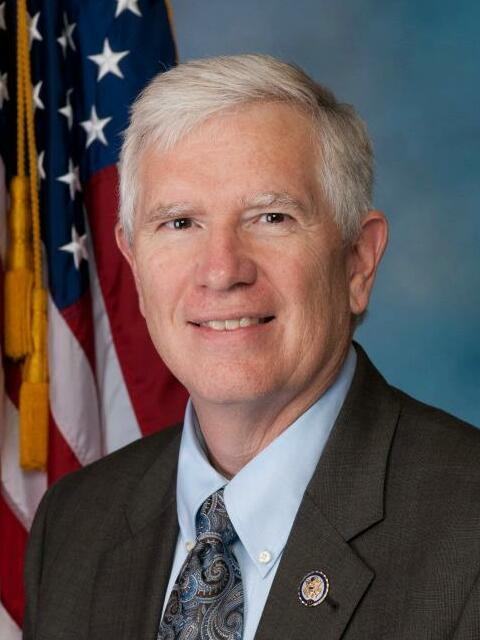

Nominee	Mo Brooks	Charlie L. Holley
Party	Republican	Democratic
Popular vote	189,185	101,772
Percentage	64.9%	35.0%
- County results Brooks: 60–70% 70–80%
U.S. Representative before election
Mo Brooks
Republican
Elected U.S. Representative
Mo Brooks
Republican

Lawrence and Colbert counties were moved from the 5th district to the 4th district during redistricting. Republican Mo Brooks, who had represented the 5th district since January 2011, sought re-election.

=== Republican primary ===
==== Candidates ====
===== Nominee =====
- Mo Brooks, incumbent U.S. representative

===== Eliminated in primary =====
- Parker Griffith, former U.S. representative

==== Primary results ====
Republican primary results
Party	Candidate	Votes	%
Republican	Mo Brooks (incumbent)	65,155	71.0
Republican	Parker Griffith	26,693	29.0
Total votes		91,848	100.0

=== Democratic primary ===
==== Candidates ====
===== Nominee =====
- Charlie Holley, Baptist minister

=== General election ===
==== Endorsements ====
Mo Brooks (R)

Organizations

- Campaign for Working Families
- Eagle Forum
- National Right to Life Committee
- NRA Political Victory Fund
- United States Chamber of Commerce
Charlie Holley (D)

Labor unions

- AFL-CIO

==== Predictions ====
Source	Ranking	As of
The Cook Political Report	Safe R	November 5, 2012
Rothenberg	Safe R	November 2, 2012
Roll Call	Safe R	November 4, 2012
Sabato's Crystal Ball	Safe R	November 5, 2012
NY Times	Safe R	November 4, 2012
RCP	Safe R	November 4, 2012
The Hill	Safe R	November 4, 2012

==== Results ====
Alabama's 5th congressional district, 2012
Party	Candidate	Votes	%
Republican	Mo Brooks (incumbent)	189,185	64.9
Democratic	Charlie L. Holley	101,772	35.0
n/a	Write-ins	336	0.1
Total votes		291,293	100.0
Republican hold			

== District 6 ==
2012 Alabama's 6th congressional district election
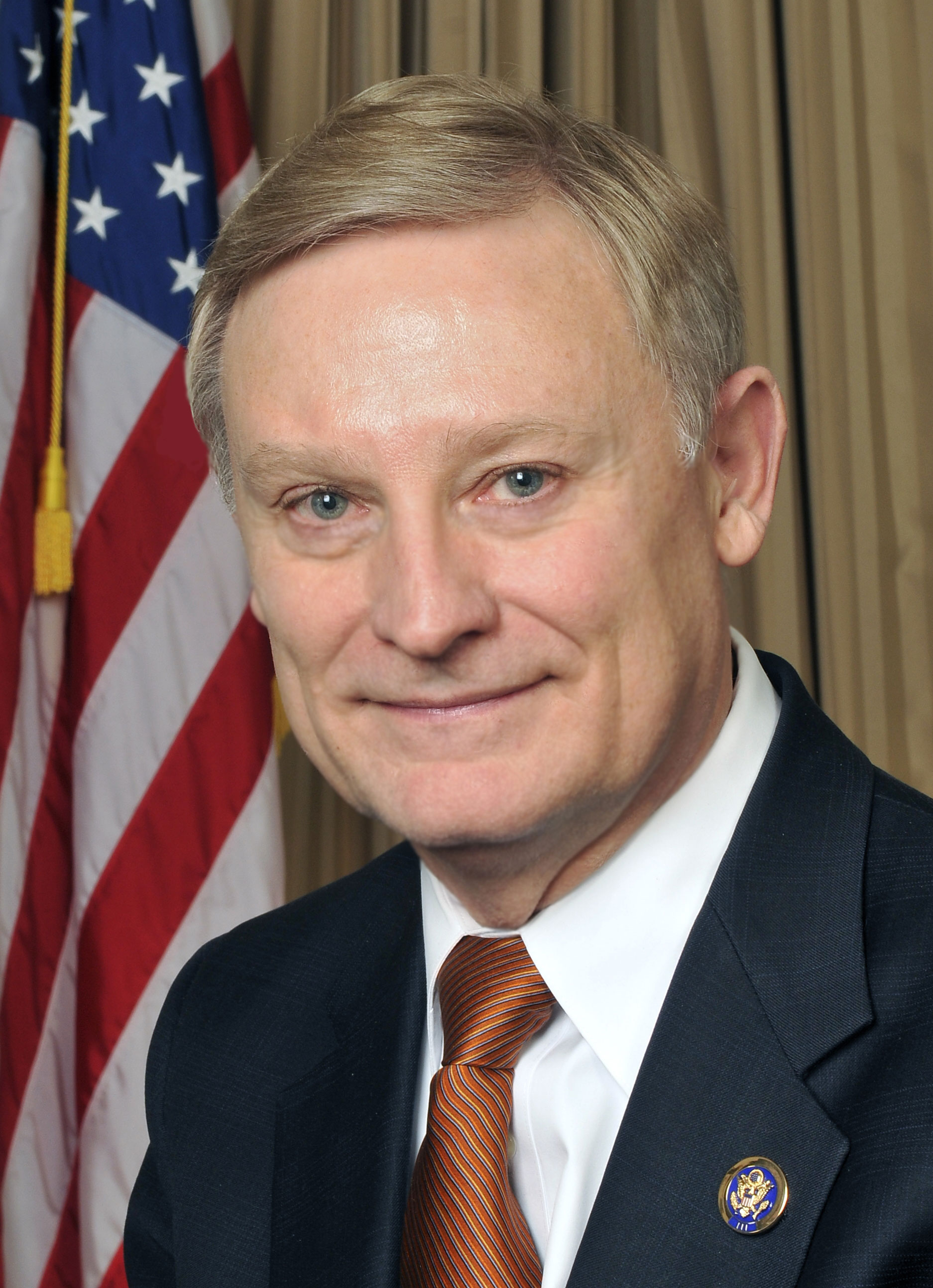

Nominee	Spencer Bachus	Penny Bailey
Party	Republican	Democratic
Popular vote	219,262	88,267
Percentage	71.2%	28.6%
- County results Bachus: 50–60% 60–70% 70–80% 80–90%
U.S. Representative before election
Spencer Bachus
Republican
Elected U.S. Representative
Spencer Bachus
Republican

The redrawn 6th district is centered around the suburbs of Birmingham. Republican Spencer Bachus, who had represented Alabama's 6th congressional district since 1993, sought re-election.

=== Republican primary ===
==== Candidates ====
===== Nominee =====
- Spencer Bachus, incumbent U.S. representative

===== Eliminated in primary =====
- Scott Beason, state senator
- Al Mickle, businessman and Tea Party activist
- David Standridge, Blount County probate judge

===== Withdrawn =====
- Justin Barkley
- Stan Pate, businessman

==== Endorsements ====
Scott Beason

Organizations

- Eagle Forum

==== Primary results ====
Republican primary results
Party	Candidate	Votes	%
Republican	Spencer Bachus (incumbent)	63,359	61.5
Republican	Scott Beason	28,671	27.9
Republican	David Standridge	8,120	7.9
Republican	Al Mickle	2,929	2.7
Republican	Stan Pate (write-in)	33	0.0
Total votes		103,112	100.0

=== Democratic primary ===
==== Candidates ====
===== Nominee =====
- Penny Bailey, retired Air Force colonel

===== Eliminated in primary =====
- William Barnes, attorney and nominee for the Senate in 2010

==== Primary results ====
Democratic primary results
Party	Candidate	Votes	%
Democratic	Penny Bailey	5,061	61.0
Democratic	William G. Barnes	3,229	39.0
Total votes		8,290	100.0

=== General election ===
==== Endorsements ====
Spencer Bachus (R)

Organizations

- Campaign for Working Families
- National Right to Life Committee
- NRA Political Victory Fund
- United States Chamber of Commerce
Penny Bailey (D)

Labor unions

- AFL-CIO

==== Predictions ====
Source	Ranking	As of
The Cook Political Report	Safe R	November 5, 2012
Rothenberg	Safe R	November 2, 2012
Roll Call	Safe R	November 4, 2012
Sabato's Crystal Ball	Safe R	November 5, 2012
NY Times	Safe R	November 4, 2012
RCP	Safe R	November 4, 2012
The Hill	Safe R	November 4, 2012

==== Results ====
Alabama's 6th congressional district, 2012
Party	Candidate	Votes	%
Republican	Spencer Bachus (incumbent)	219,262	71.2
Democratic	Penny Bailey	88,267	28.6
n/a	Write-ins	573	0.2
Total votes		308,102	100.0
Republican hold			

== District 7 ==
2012 Alabama's 7th congressional district election
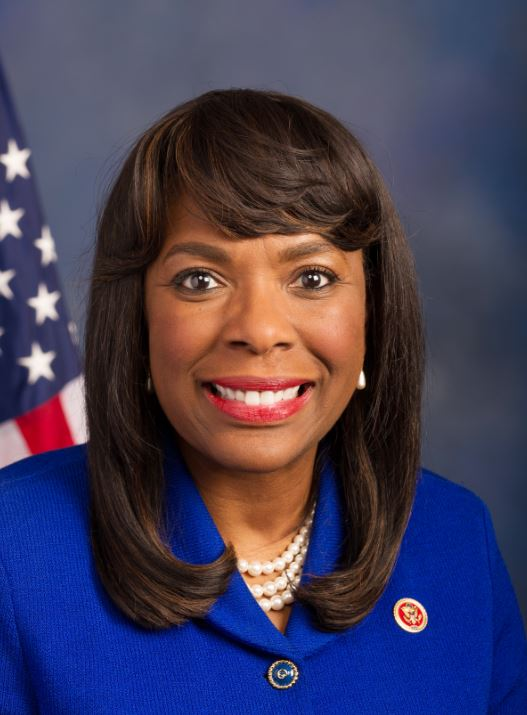

Nominee	Terri Sewell	Don Chamberlain
Party	Democratic	Republican
Popular vote	232,520	73,835
Percentage	75.8%	24.1%
- County results Sewell: 50–60% 60–70% 70–80% 80–90% >90%
U.S. Representative before election
Terri Sewell
Democratic
Elected U.S. Representative
Terri Sewell
Democratic

The redrawn 7th district, located on the state's western border, is 64% African American and was made even more favorable to Democrats in the 2010 redistricting. Incumbent Terri Sewell, who had represented the 7th district since January 2011, sought re-election.

=== Democratic primary ===
==== Candidates ====
===== Nominee =====
- Terri Sewell, incumbent U.S. representative

=== Republican primary ===
==== Candidates ====
===== Nominee =====
- Don Chamberlain

===== Eliminated in primary =====
- Phil Norris, retired United States Navy submariner

=== Primary results ===
Republican primary results
Party	Candidate	Votes	%
Republican	Don Chamberlain	11,537	66.1
Republican	Phillip Norris	5,918	33.9
Total votes		17,455	100.0

=== General election ===
==== Endorsements ====
Terri Sewell (D)

Labor unions

- AFL-CIO
- National Association of Letter Carriers
- United Steelworkers

Organizations

- Humane Society of the United States
- National Education Association
- National Organization for Women
- Planned Parenthood Action Fund

==== Predictions ====
Source	Ranking	As of
The Cook Political Report	Safe D	November 5, 2012
Rothenberg	Safe D	November 2, 2012
Roll Call	Safe D	November 4, 2012
Sabato's Crystal Ball	Safe D	November 5, 2012
NY Times	Safe D	November 4, 2012
RCP	Safe D	November 4, 2012
The Hill	Safe D	November 4, 2012

==== Results ====
Sewell won the general election, remaining the only Democrat in Alabama's Congressional delegation. This was the last time until 2022 that Republicans contested Alabama's 7th congressional district.

Alabama's 7th congressional district, 2012
Party	Candidate	Votes	%
Democratic	Terri Sewell (incumbent)	232,520	75.8
Republican	Don Chamberlain	73,835	24.1
n/a	Write-ins	203	0.1
Total votes		306,558	100.0
Democratic hold			
