= Sanctity of Human Life Act =

- Long title: An act to provide that human life shall be deemed to begin with fertilization
- Announced in: the 112th United States Congress
- Sponsored by: Paul Broun
- Number of co-sponsors: 65

Legislative history
- Introduced in the House as H.R. 212 by Paul Broun on January 7, 2011; Committee consideration by Committee on the Judiciary

The Sanctity of Human Life Act was a proposed piece of U.S. federal abortion legislation which would have conferred the status of full legal personhood on embryos beginning at fertilization or cloning.

Its 64 cosponsors, all Republicans, included Todd Akin, whose comments about rape and abortion caused political controversy later in 2012, and the 2012 Republican presidential running mate Paul Ryan.

It should not be confused with the "Sanctity of Life Act", which was a different bill introduced in its 2011 (112th Congress) version by Ron Paul with no cosponsors.
