= Alabama's 1st congressional district =

U.S. House district for Alabama

Coordinates: 30°59′13.3″N 87°56′14.34″W

- Interactive map of district boundaries
- Representative: Barry Moore; R–Enterprise
- Area: 7,182 mi^{2} (18,600 km^{2})
- Distribution: 66.82% urban; 33.18% rural
- Population (2025): 762,313
- Median household income: $73,512
- Ethnicity: 72.3% White; 16.1% Black; 4.7% Hispanic; 4.2% Two or more races; 1.4% Asian; 0.9% Native American; 0.4% other
- Cook PVI: R+17

Alabama's 1st congressional district is a United States congressional district in Alabama, which elects a representative to the United States House of Representatives. It includes the entirety of Baldwin, Coffee, Covington, Dale, Escambia, Geneva, Henry, and Houston counties, as well as parts of Mobile County.

It is currently represented by Republican Barry Moore.

== Character ==
Timber production remains the biggest source of contributions to the local economy, however recently Gulf Coast condominium developments in Baldwin County represent new economic possibilities.

Politically, this area was one of the first in Alabama to shake off its Democratic roots. It was one of five districts to swing Republican in 1964, when Barry Goldwater swept the state. The GOP has held the district in every House election since then, usually by landslide margins; indeed, a Democrat has only managed 40 percent of the vote once since the current GOP run began in the district. However, conservative Democrats continued to hold most state and local offices well into the 1990s.

It supported George W. Bush with 60% of the vote in 2000, and with 64% in 2004. In 2008, John McCain received 61.01% of the vote in the district while 38.38% supported Barack Obama.

The 1st district traditionally gives its representatives very long tenures in Washington: only nine people have represented the seat in Congress from 1897 to 2026, with six of them holding the seat for at least 10 years.

Since the 1980s, the district has changed in area every decade. In particular, the 2023 Allen v. Milligan ruling reshaped the 1st and 2nd districts; rather than splitting the southern border to an east and west district, 1st was changed to represent all south border counties as well as Coffee, Dale, and Henry Counties.

== Counties and communities within the district ==
For the 119th and successive Congresses (based on the districts drawn following the Supreme Court's decision in Allen v. Milligan), the district contains all or portions of the following counties and communities.

Baldwin County (20)

All 20 communities

Coffee County (4)

All four communities

Covington County (14)

All 14 communities

Dale County (13)

All 13 communities

Escambia County (6)

All six communities

Geneva County (9)

All nine communities

Henry County (4)

All four communities

Houston County (12)

All 12 communities

Mobile County (16)

Axis, Bayou La Batre, Belle Fontaine, Bucks, Calvert (part; also 2nd; shared with Washington County), Creola, Dauphin Island, Grand Bay, Mobile (part; also 2nd), Mount Vernon, Movico, Pritchard (part; also 2nd), Saraland, Satsuma, Theodore, Tillmans Corner (part; also 2nd)

== Recent election results from statewide races ==
The following chart shows the result of recent federal and statewide races in the 1st district.

Year	Office	Winner	D %	R %
2008	President	John McCain (R)	38.3%	60.6%
Redistricted for the 2012 cycle
2012	President	Mitt Romney (R)	37.3%	61.7%
2016	President	Donald Trump (R)	33.8%	63.0%
2016	Senate	Richard Shelby (R)	34.5%	65.3%
2017	Senate (special)	Roy Moore (R)	48.2%	50.1%
2018	Governor	Kay Ivey (R)	39.3%	60.6%
2018	Lieutenant Governor	Will Ainsworth (R)	37.6%	62.3%
2018	Attorney General	Steve Marshall (R)	40.2%	59.7%
2020	President	Donald Trump (R)	35.2%	63.5%
2020	Senate	Tommy Tuberville (R)	39.0%	60.9%
Redistricted for the 2022 cycle
2022	Senate	Katie Britt (R)	28.6%	69.0%
2022	Governor	Kay Ivey (R)	27.2%	68.3%
2022	Attorney General	Steve Marshall (R)	30.0%	69.9%
2022	Secretary of State	Wes Allen (R)	29.3%	67.3%
Redistricted for the 2024 cycle
2024	President	Donald Trump (R)	22.0%	77.0%
2026	Senate	Barry Moore (R)	45.3%	54.7%

== List of members representing the district ==
Member	Party	Years	Cong ress	Electoral history	District location and map
District created March 4, 1823
Gabriel Moore (Huntsville)	Democratic-Republican	March 4, 1823 – March 3, 1825	18th 19th 20th	Redistricted from the at-large district and re-elected in 1823. Re-elected in 1825. Re-elected in 1827. Retired.	1823–1833
Gabriel Moore (Huntsville)	Jacksonian	March 4, 1825 – March 3, 1829	18th 19th 20th	Redistricted from the at-large district and re-elected in 1823. Re-elected in 1825. Re-elected in 1827. Retired.	1823–1833
Clement Comer Clay (Huntsville)	Jacksonian	March 4, 1829 – March 3, 1835	21st 22nd 23rd	Elected in 1829. Re-elected in 1831. Re-elected in 1833. Retired to run for governor.	1823–1833
Clement Comer Clay (Huntsville)	Jacksonian	March 4, 1829 – March 3, 1835	21st 22nd 23rd	Elected in 1829. Re-elected in 1831. Re-elected in 1833. Retired to run for governor.	1833–1841
Reuben Chapman (Somerville)	Jacksonian	March 4, 1835 – March 3, 1837	24th 25th 26th	Elected in 1835. Re-elected in 1837. Re-elected in 1839. Redistricted to the at-large district.	1833–1841
Reuben Chapman (Somerville)	Democratic	March 4, 1837 – March 3, 1841	24th 25th 26th	Elected in 1835. Re-elected in 1837. Re-elected in 1839. Redistricted to the at-large district.	1833–1841
District inactive		March 3, 1841 – March 3, 1843	27th	All representatives elected at-large.	
James Dellet (Claiborne)	Whig	March 4, 1843 – March 3, 1845	28th	Elected in 1843. Retired.	1843–1855
Edmund Strother Dargan (Mobile)	Democratic	March 4, 1845 – March 3, 1847	29th	Elected in 1845. Retired.	1843–1855
John Gayle (Mobile)	Whig	March 4, 1847 – March 3, 1849	30th	Elected in 1847. Retired.	1843–1855
William J. Alston (Linden)	Whig	March 4, 1849 – March 3, 1851	31st	Elected in 1849. Retired.	1843–1855
John Bragg (Mobile)	Democratic	March 4, 1851 – March 3, 1853	32nd	Elected in 1851. Retired.	1843–1855
Philip Phillips (Mobile)	Democratic	March 4, 1853 – March 3, 1855	33rd	Elected in 1853. Retired.	1843–1855
Percy Walker (Mobile)	Know Nothing	March 4, 1855 – March 3, 1857	34th	Elected in 1855. Retired.	1855–1863
James Adams Stallworth (Evergreen)	Democratic	March 4, 1857 – January 12, 1861	35th 36th	Elected in 1857. Re-elected in 1859. Withdrew due to Civil War.	1855–1863
Vacant		January 12, 1861 – July 22, 1868	36th 37th 38th 39th 40th	Civil War and Reconstruction	
Francis William Kellogg (Mobile)	Republican	July 22, 1868 – March 3, 1869	40th	Elected in 1868 to finish term. Retired.	1863–1873
Alfred Eliab Buck (Mobile)	Republican	March 4, 1869 – March 3, 1871	41st	Elected in 1868. Retired.	1863–1873
Benjamin S. Turner (Selma)	Republican	March 4, 1871 – March 3, 1873	42nd	Elected in 1870. Lost re-election.	1863–1873
Frederick George Bromberg (Mobile)	Liberal Republican	March 4, 1873 – March 3, 1875	43rd	Elected in 1872. Lost re-election.	1873–1877
Jeremiah Haralson (Selma)	Republican	March 4, 1875 – March 3, 1877	44th	Elected in 1874. Redistricted to the 4th district and lost re-election.	1873–1877
James T. Jones (Demopolis)	Democratic	March 4, 1877 – March 3, 1879	45th	Elected in 1876. Lost renomination.	1877–1933
Thomas H. Herndon (Mobile)	Democratic	March 4, 1879 – March 28, 1883	46th 47th 48th	Elected in 1878. Re-elected in 1880. Re-elected in 1882. Died.	1877–1933
Vacant		March 28, 1883 – December 3, 1883	48th		1877–1933
James T. Jones (Demopolis)	Democratic	December 3, 1883 – March 3, 1889	48th 49th 50th	Elected to finish Herndon's term. Re-elected in 1884. Re-elected in 1886. Retired.	1877–1933
Richard Henry Clarke (Mobile)	Democratic	March 4, 1889 – March 3, 1897	51st 52nd 53rd 54th	Elected in 1888. Re-elected in 1890. Re-elected in 1892. Re-elected in 1894. Retired to run for Governor.	1877–1933
George W. Taylor (Demopolis)	Democratic	March 4, 1897 – March 3, 1915	55th 56th 57th 58th 59th 60th 61st 62nd 63rd	Elected in 1896. Re-elected in 1898. Re-elected in 1900. Re-elected in 1902. Re-elected in 1904. Re-elected in 1906. Re-elected in 1908. Re-elected in 1910. Re-elected in 1912. Retired.	1877–1933
Oscar Lee Gray (Butler)	Democratic	March 4, 1915 – March 3, 1919	64th 65th	Elected in 1914. Re-elected in 1916. Retired.	1877–1933
John McDuffie (Monroeville)	Democratic	March 4, 1919 – March 2, 1935	66th 67th 68th 69th 70th 71st 72nd 73rd 74th	Elected in 1918. Re-elected in 1920. Re-elected in 1922. Re-elected in 1924. Re-elected in 1926. Re-elected in 1928. Re-elected in 1930. Re-elected in 1932. Re-elected in 1934; Resigned to become U.S. District Judge.	1877–1933
John McDuffie (Monroeville)	Democratic	March 4, 1919 – March 2, 1935	66th 67th 68th 69th 70th 71st 72nd 73rd 74th	Elected in 1918. Re-elected in 1920. Re-elected in 1922. Re-elected in 1924. Re-elected in 1926. Re-elected in 1928. Re-elected in 1930. Re-elected in 1932. Re-elected in 1934; Resigned to become U.S. District Judge.	1933–1963
Vacant		March 2, 1935 – July 30, 1935	74th		1933–1963
Frank W. Boykin (Mobile)	Democratic	July 30, 1935 – January 3, 1963	74th 75th 76th 77th 78th 79th 80th 81st 82nd 83rd 84th 85th 86th 87th	Elected to finish McDuffie's term. Re-elected in 1936. Re-elected in 1938. Re-elected in 1940. Re-elected in 1942. Re-elected in 1944. Re-elected in 1946. Re-elected in 1948. Re-elected in 1950. Re-elected in 1952. Re-elected in 1954. Re-elected in 1956. Re-elected in 1958. Re-elected in 1960. Redistricted to the at-large district and lost renomination.	1933–1963
District inactive		January 3, 1963 – January 3, 1965	88th	All representatives elected at-large.	
Jack Edwards (Mobile)	Republican	January 3, 1965 – January 3, 1985	89th 90th 91st 92nd 93rd 94th 95th 96th 97th 98th	Elected in 1964. Re-elected in 1966. Re-elected in 1968. Re-elected in 1970. Re-elected in 1972. Re-elected in 1974. Re-elected in 1976. Re-elected in 1978. Re-elected in 1980. Re-elected in 1982. Retired.	1965–1983
Jack Edwards (Mobile)	Republican	January 3, 1965 – January 3, 1985	89th 90th 91st 92nd 93rd 94th 95th 96th 97th 98th	Elected in 1964. Re-elected in 1966. Re-elected in 1968. Re-elected in 1970. Re-elected in 1972. Re-elected in 1974. Re-elected in 1976. Re-elected in 1978. Re-elected in 1980. Re-elected in 1982. Retired.	1983–1993
Sonny Callahan (Mobile)	Republican	January 3, 1985 – January 3, 2003	99th 100th 101st 102nd 103rd 104th 105th 106th 107th	Elected in 1984. Re-elected in 1986. Re-elected in 1988. Re-elected in 1990. Re-elected in 1992. Re-elected in 1994. Re-elected in 1996. Re-elected in 1998. Re-elected in 2000. Retired.	1983–1993
Sonny Callahan (Mobile)	Republican	January 3, 1985 – January 3, 2003	99th 100th 101st 102nd 103rd 104th 105th 106th 107th	Elected in 1984. Re-elected in 1986. Re-elected in 1988. Re-elected in 1990. Re-elected in 1992. Re-elected in 1994. Re-elected in 1996. Re-elected in 1998. Re-elected in 2000. Retired.	1993–2003
Jo Bonner (Mobile)	Republican	January 3, 2003 – August 2, 2013	108th 109th 110th 111th 112th 113th	Elected in 2002. Re-elected in 2004. Re-elected in 2006. Re-elected in 2008. Re-elected in 2010. Re-elected in 2012. Resigned to become vice-chancellor in University of Alabama System.	2003–2013
Jo Bonner (Mobile)	Republican	January 3, 2003 – August 2, 2013	108th 109th 110th 111th 112th 113th	Elected in 2002. Re-elected in 2004. Re-elected in 2006. Re-elected in 2008. Re-elected in 2010. Re-elected in 2012. Resigned to become vice-chancellor in University of Alabama System.	2013–2023
Vacant		August 2, 2013 – January 8, 2014	113th		2013–2023
Bradley Byrne (Fairhope)	Republican	January 8, 2014 – January 3, 2021	113th 114th 115th 116th	Elected to finish Bonner's term. Re-elected in 2014. Re-elected in 2016. Re-elected in 2018. Retired to run for U.S. Senator.	2013–2023
Jerry Carl (Mobile)	Republican	January 3, 2021 – January 3, 2025	117th 118th	Elected in 2020. Re-elected in 2022. Lost renomination.	2013–2023
Jerry Carl (Mobile)	Republican	January 3, 2021 – January 3, 2025	117th 118th	Elected in 2020. Re-elected in 2022. Lost renomination.	2023–2025
Barry Moore (Enterprise)	Republican	January 3, 2025 – present	119th	Redistricted from the 2nd district and re-elected in 2024. Retired to run for U.S. Senator.	2025–2027
Jerry Carl (Mobile)	Republican	Assuming office January 3, 2027		Elected in 2026.	2027–present

== Recent election results ==
These are the results from the previous fourteen election cycles in Alabama's 1st district.

=== 2002 ===
2002 Alabama's 1st congressional district election
Party	Candidate	Votes	%
Republican	Jo Bonner (incumbent)	108,102	60.50
Democratic	Judy McCain Belk	67,507	37.78
Libertarian	Dick Coffee	2,957	1.65
Write-in		121	0.07
Total votes		178,687	100.00
Republican hold			

=== 2004 ===
2004 Alabama's 1st congressional district election
Party	Candidate	Votes	%
Republican	Jo Bonner (incumbent)	161,067	63.12
Democratic	Judy McCain Belk	93,938	36.81
Write-in		159	0.06
Total votes		255,164	100.00
Republican hold			

=== 2006 ===
2006 Alabama's 1st congressional district election
Party	Candidate	Votes	%
Republican	Jo Bonner (incumbent)	112,944	68.10
Democratic	Vivian Beckerle	52,770	31.82
Write-in		127	0.08
Total votes		165,841	100.00
Republican hold			

=== 2008 ===
2008 Alabama's 1st congressional district election
Party	Candidate	Votes	%
Republican	Jo Bonner (incumbent)	210,660	98.27
Write-in		3,707	1.73
Total votes		214,367	100.00
Republican hold			

=== 2010 ===
2010 Alabama's 1st congressional district election
Party	Candidate	Votes	%
Republican	Jo Bonner (incumbent)	129,063	82.58
Constitution	David M. Walter	26,357	16.87
Write-in		861	0.55
Total votes		156,281	100.00
Republican hold			

=== 2012 ===
2012 Alabama's 1st congressional district election
Party	Candidate	Votes	%
Republican	Jo Bonner (incumbent)	196,374	97.86
Write-in		4,302	2.14
Total votes		200,676	100.00
Republican hold			

=== 2013 (special) ===
2013 Alabama's 1st congressional district special election
Party	Candidate	Votes	%
Republican	Bradley Byrne	36,042	70.66
Democratic	Burton LeFlore	14,968	29.34
Total votes		51,010	100.00
Republican hold			

=== 2014 ===
2014 Alabama's 1st congressional district election
Party	Candidate	Votes	%
Republican	Bradley Byrne (incumbent)	103,758	68.16
Democratic	Burton LeFlore	48,278	31.71
Write-in		198	0.13
Total votes		152,234	100.00
Republican hold			

=== 2016 ===
2016 Alabama's 1st congressional district election
Party	Candidate	Votes	%
Republican	Bradley Byrne (incumbent)	208,083	96.38
Write-in		7,810	3.62
Total votes		215,893	100.00
Republican hold			

=== 2018 ===
2018 Alabama's 1st congressional district election
Party	Candidate	Votes	%
Republican	Bradley Byrne (incumbent)	153,228	63.16
Democratic	Robert Kennedy, Jr.	89,226	36.78
Write-in		163	0.07
Total votes		242,617	100.00
Republican hold			

=== 2020 ===
2020 Alabama's 1st congressional district election
Party	Candidate	Votes	%
Republican	Jerry Carl	211,825	64.37
Democratic	James Averhart	116,949	35.54
Write-in		301	0.09
Total votes		329,075	100.00
Republican hold			

=== 2022 ===
2022 Alabama's 1st congressional district election
Party	Candidate	Votes	%
Republican	Jerry Carl (incumbent)	140,592	83.61
Libertarian	Alexander Remrey	26,369	15.68
Write-in		1,189	0.71
Total votes		168,150	100.00
Republican hold			

=== 2024 ===
2024 Alabama's 1st congressional district election
Party	Candidate	Votes	%
Republican	Barry Moore	258,619	78.40
Democratic	Tom Holmes	70,929	21.50
Total votes		329,854	100.00
Republican hold			

=== 2026 ===
2026 Alabama's 1st congressional district election
Party	Candidate	Votes	%
Republican	Jerry Carl	137,025	59.07
Democratic	Clyde Jones	94,940	40.93
Total votes		231,965	100.00
Republican hold			

== See also ==
- Alabama's congressional districts
- List of United States congressional districts
- Redistricting in the United States
