= Alabama's 6th congressional district =

U.S. House district for Alabama

Coordinates: 33°18′35.54″N 86°44′23.31″W

- Interactive map of district boundaries
- Representative: Gary Palmer; R–Hoover
- Area: 4,649 mi^{2} (12,040 km^{2})
- Distribution: 69.17% urban; 30.83% rural
- Population (2025): 734,531
- Median household income: $89,184
- Ethnicity: 71.2% White; 17.4% Black; 5.5% Hispanic; 3.5% Two or more races; 1.8% Asian; 0.6% other
- Occupation: 67.7% White-collar; 22.1% Blue-collar; 10.2% Gray-collar
- Cook PVI: R+17

Alabama's 6th congressional district is a United States congressional district in Alabama that elects a representative to the United States House of Representatives. It is composed of the wealthier portions of Birmingham, nearly all of Jefferson County outside Birmingham and the entirety of Autauga, Bibb, Chilton, Coosa, Elmore, and Shelby counties. It is the richest congressional district in the state of Alabama.

It is currently represented by Republican Gary Palmer.

== Character ==
Once encompassing all of Birmingham and Jefferson County, Alabama's 6th congressional district is now the suburban Birmingham-area district, with nearly all of the urban precincts having been removed since 1992. Due to a continual process of redistricting since the 1990s, the 6th district has taken on an increasingly unusual shape (typical of gerrymandered districts); it has included all of Jefferson County except for a long gash where most of Birmingham itself has been drawn into the neighboring majority-black 7th district.

The demography of the district consists mostly of middle and upper middle-class white-collar white families whose adults work in Birmingham. Increasingly, the population of the Birmingham districts has become racially and politically polarized. Since the 1960s, most wealthier whites moved from the city to the suburbs, settling in newer housing in suburban Jefferson County and nearby Shelby County. The African American population of the region has remained largely in more urban areas, even as the upper-class live in income-related neighborhoods. Since assuming its present configuration in 1993, it has become one of the most Republican districts in the country. In 2004 it voted 78% for Republican George W. Bush in the presidential election (in keeping with the current proportion of white majority of its population). John McCain swept the district in 2008, taking 75.91% of the vote while Barack Obama received 23.28%. The district's Republican bent is no less pronounced at the congressional level. Since it assumed its current configuration after the 1990 census, a Democrat has only won as much as 30 percent of the vote twice.

Birmingham was once the vanguard district for steel production and metalworking in the South, but restructuring of heavy industries hollowed out the economy of the city, taking many jobs with it. The economy of the 6th district since the late 20th century has centered on the banking industry (Birmingham is the second-largest banking area in the South) and health care/medical research. Voters are socially conservative; however, fiscal conservatism is the most salient feature of this district.

== History ==
Alabama's 6th congressional district was originally created in 1843. It encompassed the northeastern portion of Alabama, approximately the modern counties of DeKalb, Jackson, Madison, Marshall, Etowah, St. Clair, Blount and Cullman.

The district had a population of 66,111 as of the 1840 U.S. census, which made it the second least populous district in Alabama. Neither Cullman County nor Etowah County existed at the time, so only the eastern portion of what today is Cullman County was in the district. In the case of St. Clair County, it appears that only about half of St. Clair County in 1843 was in the district. The district was redrawn in 1855. This was done in time for the election of representatives to the 34th Congress which was held August 6, 1855. The new boundaries put Cherokee County in the 6th district and removed St. Clair County. These boundaries remained in place until the Civil War.

When Alabama again elected representatives to the U.S. Congress in 1868 for the halfway completed 40th Congress, the 6th district consisted of northwestern Alabama. The only county remaining in the district from before was Blount County. It also encompassed Jefferson, Marion, Walker, Morgan, Limestone, Franklin, Lauderdale and Winston counties. Colbert County did not exist at the time, but was part of Franklin County. This was one of the areas of Alabama where the Democrats soonest regained control after the Civil War.

In 1876, the 6th district was redrawn again. The sixth-most northern counties (including Colbert County which now existed) were transferred to the new Alabama 8th Congressional district, while the six counties southwestward from Jefferson County were transferred to the 6th district. This set of boundaries only existed for one election. By the time of the 1878 election, Cullman County had been formed. It was in the 6th district, but Blount County was moved to the 8th district. The boundaries did not exactly correspond to county lines at that time, and with another change in county boundaries by 1880 even more area in the general vicinity of Blount County was moved to the 7th district. This process was continued in 1884 with the removal of Cullman County from the district.

1892 saw more changes in the boundaries of the 6th district. Winston County was moved to the 7th district. At the same time, Jefferson County was placed in the new 9th district. By this time the 6th district consisted of west central Alabama. In the 1892 election, there were about 22,000 votes cast in the 6th district as opposed to 30,000 cast in the 9th district.

In 1902, Perry County and some other areas in the southern portion of Alabama's 9th Congressional District were transferred to the 6th District. The state legislature did not redistrict for several decades, resulting in urban and industrial areas being under-represented in congressional and state districts. It was forced to redistrict after a 1972 Supreme Court case based on the principle of one man-one vote.

== Counties and communities ==
For the 119th and successive Congresses (based on the districts drawn following the Supreme Court's decision in Allen v. Milligan), the district contains all or portions of the following counties and communities.

Autauga County (6)

All six communities

Bibb County (5)

All five communities

Chilton County (5)

All five communities

Coosa County (11)

All 11 communities

Elmore County (12)

All 12 communities

Jefferson County (22)

Argo (part; also 3rd; shared with St. Clair County), Birmingham (part; also 7th), Center Point (part; also 7th), Clay, County Line (part; also 4th; shared with Blount County), Fultondale (part; also 7th), Gardendale, Grayson Valley, Graysville (part; also 7th), Helena (part; also 7th; shared with Shelby County), Homewood (part; also 7th), Hoover (part; also 7th; shared with Shelby County), Irondale (part; also 7th), Kimberly, Leeds (part; also 3rd; shared with St. Clair and Shelby counties), Morris, Mount Olive, Mountain Brook, Pinson, Sumiton (part; also 4th; shared with Walker County), Trafford (part; also 4th; shared with Blount County), Trussville, Vestavia Hills (shared with Shelby County), Warrior

Shelby County (28)

All 28 communities

Talladega County (3)

Fayetteville (part; also 3rd), Sylacauga (part; also 3rd), Talladega Springs

== Recent election results from statewide races ==
The following chart shows the results of recent federal and statewide races in the 6th district.

Year	Office	Winner	D %	R %
2012	President	Mitt Romney (R)	24.6%	74.3%
2016	President	Donald Trump (R)	25.8%	69.6%
2016	Senate	Richard Shelby (R)	27.0%	72.8%
2017	Senate (special)	Roy Moore (R)	44.9%	52.7%
2018	Governor	Kay Ivey (R)	35.4%	64.5%
2018	Lieutenant Governor	Will Ainsworth (R)	31.6%	68.4%
2018	Attorney General	Steve Marshall (R)	34.2%	65.8%
2020	President	Donald Trump (R)	31.5%	66.8%
2020	Senate	Tommy Tuberville (R)	34.6%	65.2%
Redistricted for the 2022 cycle
2022	Senate	Katie Britt (R)	29.1%	67.5%
2022	Governor	Kay Ivey (R)	26.7%	68.0%
2022	Attorney General	Steve Marshall (R)	30.4%	69.5%
2022	Secretary of State	Wes Allen (R)	29.1%	67.4%
Redistricted for the 2024 cycle
2024	President	Donald Trump (R)	29.7%	68.6%

== List of members representing the district ==
Member	Party	Years	Cong ress	Electoral history	Location
District created March 4, 1843
Reuben Chapman (Somerville)	Democratic	March 4, 1843 – March 3, 1847	28th 29th	Redistricted from the at-large district and re-elected in 1843. Re-elected in 1845. Retired to run for governor.	
Williamson R. W. Cobb (Bellefonte)	Democratic	March 4, 1847 – January 30, 1861	30th 31st 32nd 33rd 34th 35th 36th	Elected in 1847. Re-elected in 1849. Re-elected in 1851. Re-elected in 1853. Re-elected in 1855. Re-elected in 1857. Re-elected in 1859. Withdrew due to Civil War.	
Vacant		January 30, 1861 – July 21, 1868	36th 37th 38th 39th 40th	Civil War and Reconstruction	
Thomas Haughey (Decatur)	Republican	July 21, 1868 – March 3, 1869	40th	Elected to finish the partial term. Lost re-election as an Independent Republican.	
William Crawford Sherrod (Courtland)	Democratic	March 4, 1869 – March 3, 1871	41st	Elected in 1869. Retired.	
Joseph Humphrey Sloss (Tuscumbia)	Democratic	March 4, 1871 – March 3, 1875	42nd 43rd	Elected in 1870. Re-elected in 1872. Lost re-election.	
Goldsmith W. Hewitt (Birmingham)	Democratic	March 4, 1875 – March 3, 1879	44th 45th	Elected in 1874. Re-elected in 1876. Retired.	
Burwell Boykin Lewis (Tuscaloosa)	Democratic	March 4, 1879 – October 1, 1880	46th	Elected in 1878. Resigned to become President of the University of Alabama.	
Vacant		October 1, 1880 – December 8, 1880	46th		
Newton Nash Clements (Tuscaloosa)	Democratic	December 8, 1880 – March 3, 1881	46th	Elected to finish Lewis's term. Retired.	
Goldsmith W. Hewitt (Birmingham)	Democratic	March 4, 1881 – March 3, 1885	47th 48th	Elected in 1880. Re-elected in 1882. Retired.	
John Mason Martin (Tuscaloosa)	Democratic	March 4, 1885 – March 3, 1887	49th	Elected in 1884. Lost re-election.	
John H. Bankhead (Fayette)	Democratic	March 4, 1887 – March 3, 1907	50th 51st 52nd 53rd 54th 55th 56th 57th 58th 59th	Elected in 1886. Re-elected in 1888. Re-elected in 1890. Re-elected in 1892. Re-elected in 1894. Re-elected in 1896. Re-elected in 1898. Re-elected in 1900. Re-elected in 1902. Re-elected in 1904. Lost renomination.	
Richmond P. Hobson (Greensboro)	Democratic	March 4, 1907 – March 3, 1915	60th 61st 62nd 63rd	Elected in 1906. Re-elected in 1908. Re-elected in 1910. Re-elected in 1912. Lost renomination.	
William Bacon Oliver (Tuscaloosa)	Democratic	March 4, 1915 – January 3, 1937	64th 65th 66th 67th 68th 69th 70th 71st 72nd 73rd 74th	Elected in 1914. Re-elected in 1916. Re-elected in 1918. Re-elected in 1920. Re-elected in 1922. Re-elected in 1924. Re-elected in 1926. Re-elected in 1928. Re-elected in 1930. Re-elected in 1932. Re-elected in 1934. Retired.	
Pete Jarman (Livingston)	Democratic	January 3, 1937 – January 3, 1949	75th 76th 77th 78th 79th 80th	Elected in 1936. Re-elected in 1938. Re-elected in 1940. Re-elected in 1942. Re-elected in 1944. Re-elected in 1946. Lost renomination.	
Edward deGraffenried (Tuscaloosa)	Democratic	January 3, 1949 – January 3, 1953	81st 82nd	Elected in 1948. Re-elected in 1950. Lost renomination.	
Armistead I. Selden Jr. (Greensboro)	Democratic	January 3, 1953 – January 3, 1963	83rd 84th 85th 86th 87th	Elected in 1952. Re-elected in 1954. Re-elected in 1956. Re-elected in 1958. Re-elected in 1960. Redistricted to the at-large district.	
District inactive		January 3, 1963 – January 3, 1965	88th	All representatives elected at-large on a general ticket.	
John Hall Buchanan Jr. (Birmingham)	Republican	January 3, 1965 – January 3, 1981	89th 90th 91st 92nd 93rd 94th 95th 96th	Elected in 1964. Re-elected in 1966. Re-elected in 1968. Re-elected in 1970. Re-elected in 1972. Re-elected in 1974. Re-elected in 1976. Re-elected in 1978. Lost renomination.	
Albert L. Smith Jr. (Birmingham)	Republican	January 3, 1981 – January 3, 1983	97th	Elected in 1980. Lost re-election.	
Ben Erdreich (Birmingham)	Democratic	January 3, 1983 – January 3, 1993	98th 99th 100th 101st 102nd	Elected in 1982. Re-elected in 1984. Re-elected in 1986. Re-elected in 1988. Re-elected in 1990. Lost re-election.	
Spencer Bachus (Vestavia Hills)	Republican	January 3, 1993 – January 3, 2015	103rd 104th 105th 106th 107th 108th 109th 110th 111th 112th 113th	Elected in 1992. Re-elected in 1994. Re-elected in 1996. Re-elected in 1998. Re-elected in 2000. Re-elected in 2002. Re-elected in 2004. Re-elected in 2006. Re-elected in 2008. Re-elected in 2010. Re-elected in 2012. Retired.	1993–2003 [data missing]
Spencer Bachus (Vestavia Hills)	Republican	January 3, 1993 – January 3, 2015	103rd 104th 105th 106th 107th 108th 109th 110th 111th 112th 113th	Elected in 1992. Re-elected in 1994. Re-elected in 1996. Re-elected in 1998. Re-elected in 2000. Re-elected in 2002. Re-elected in 2004. Re-elected in 2006. Re-elected in 2008. Re-elected in 2010. Re-elected in 2012. Retired.	2003–2013
Spencer Bachus (Vestavia Hills)	Republican	January 3, 1993 – January 3, 2015	103rd 104th 105th 106th 107th 108th 109th 110th 111th 112th 113th	Elected in 1992. Re-elected in 1994. Re-elected in 1996. Re-elected in 1998. Re-elected in 2000. Re-elected in 2002. Re-elected in 2004. Re-elected in 2006. Re-elected in 2008. Re-elected in 2010. Re-elected in 2012. Retired.	2013–2023
Gary Palmer (Hoover)	Republican	January 3, 2015 – present	114th 115th 116th 117th 118th 119th	Elected in 2014. Re-elected in 2016. Re-elected in 2018. Re-elected in 2020. Re-elected in 2022. Re-elected in 2024. Re-elected in 2026.	2013–2023
Gary Palmer (Hoover)	Republican	January 3, 2015 – present	114th 115th 116th 117th 118th 119th	Elected in 2014. Re-elected in 2016. Re-elected in 2018. Re-elected in 2020. Re-elected in 2022. Re-elected in 2024. Re-elected in 2026.	2023–2025
Gary Palmer (Hoover)	Republican	January 3, 2015 – present	114th 115th 116th 117th 118th 119th	Elected in 2014. Re-elected in 2016. Re-elected in 2018. Re-elected in 2020. Re-elected in 2022. Re-elected in 2024. Re-elected in 2026.	2025–2027
Gary Palmer (Hoover)	Republican	January 3, 2015 – present	114th 115th 116th 117th 118th 119th	Elected in 2014. Re-elected in 2016. Re-elected in 2018. Re-elected in 2020. Re-elected in 2022. Re-elected in 2024. Re-elected in 2026.	2027–present

== Recent election results ==
These are the results from the previous twelve election cycles in Alabama's 6th district.

=== 2002 ===
2002 Alabama's 6th congressional district election
Party	Candidate	Votes	%
Republican	Spencer Bachus (incumbent)	178,171	89.83
Libertarian	J. Holden McAllister	19,639	9.90
Write-in		536	0.27
Total votes		198,346	100.00
Republican hold			

=== 2004 ===
2004 Alabama's 6th congressional district election
Party	Candidate	Votes	%
Republican	Spencer Bachus (incumbent)	264,819	98.80
Write-in		3,224	1.20
Total votes		268,043	100.00
Republican hold			

=== 2006 ===
2006 Alabama's 6th congressional district election
Party	Candidate	Votes	%
Republican	Spencer Bachus (incumbent)	163,514	98.32
Write-in		2,786	1.68
Total votes		166,300	100.00
Republican hold			

=== 2008 ===
2008 Alabama's 6th congressional district election
Party	Candidate	Votes	%
Republican	Spencer Bachus (incumbent)	280,902	97.79%
Write-in		6,335	2.21%
Total votes		287,237	100%
Republican hold			

=== 2010 ===
2010 Alabama's 6th congressional district election
Party	Candidate	Votes	%
Republican	Spencer Bachus (incumbent)	205,288	98.05
Write-in		4,076	1.95
Total votes		209,364	100.00
Republican hold			

=== 2012 ===
2012 Alabama's 6th congressional district election
Party	Candidate	Votes	%
Republican	Spencer Bachus (incumbent)	219,262	71.17
Democratic	Penny Hudgins Bailey	88,267	28.65
Write-in		573	0.19
Total votes		308,102	100.00
Republican hold			

=== 2014 ===
2014 Alabama's 6th congressional district election
Party	Candidate	Votes	%
Republican	Gary Palmer	135,945	76.18
Democratic	Mark Lester	42,291	23.70
Write-in		213	0.12
Total votes		178,449	100.00
Republican hold			

=== 2016 ===
2016 Alabama's 6th congressional district election
Party	Candidate	Votes	%
Republican	Gary Palmer (incumbent)	245,313	74.49
Democratic	David Putman	83,709	25.42
Write-in		284	0.09
Total votes		329,306	100.00
Republican hold			

=== 2018 ===
2018 Alabama's 6th congressional district election
Party	Candidate	Votes	%
Republican	Gary Palmer (incumbent)	192,542	69.18
Democratic	Danner Kline	85,644	30.77
Write-in		142	0.05
Total votes		278,328	100.00
Republican hold			

=== 2020 ===
2020 Alabama's 6th congressional district election
Party	Candidate	Votes	%
Republican	Gary Palmer (incumbent)	274,160	97.13
Write-in		8,101	2.87
Total votes		282,261	100.00
Republican hold			

=== 2022 ===
2022 Alabama's 6th congressional district election
Party	Candidate	Votes	%
Republican	Gary Palmer (incumbent)	154,058	83.73
Libertarian	Andria Chieffo	27,792	15.11
Write-in		2,135	1.16
Total votes		183,985	100.00
Republican hold			

=== 2024 ===
2024 Alabama's 6th congressional district election
Party	Candidate	Votes	%
Republican	Gary Palmer (incumbent)	243,741	70.32
Democratic	Elizabeth Anderson	102,504	29.57
Write-in		380	0.11
Total votes		346,625	100.00
Republican hold			

== See also ==
- Alabama's congressional districts
- List of United States congressional districts
