= Alabama's 7th congressional district =

U.S. House district for Alabama

Coordinates: 32°33′5.2″N 87°52′17.04″W

- Interactive map of district boundaries
- Representative: Terri Sewell; D–Birmingham
- Area: 8,780 mi^{2} (22,700 km^{2})
- Distribution: 72.16% urban; 27.84% rural
- Population (2025): 719,301
- Median household income: $53,895
- Ethnicity: 52.5% Black; 38.8% White; 4.5% Hispanic; 2.4% Two or more races; 1.3% Asian; 0.5% other
- Cook PVI: D+10

Alabama's 7th congressional district is a United States congressional district in Alabama that elects a representative to the United States House of Representatives. The district encompasses Choctaw, Dallas, Greene, Hale, Lowndes, Marengo, Pickens, Perry, Sumter and Wilcox counties, and portions of Clarke, Jefferson, and Tuscaloosa counties. The district encompasses portions of the Birmingham, Montgomery and Tuscaloosa/Northport urban areas. The largest city entirely within the district is Selma.

The district has been majority nonwhite, with a majority of African-American residents, since the redistricting following the 1990 census. As such, and with a Cook Partisan Voting Index rating of D+13, it is the most Democratic district in Alabama. The district was adjusted due to the judicial selection of a new congressional map as a result of the case Allen v. Milligan, with its share of Montgomery and half of Clarke County shifted to the 2nd district and a portion of Tuscaloosa County given to the 4th district. It is currently represented by Democrat Terri Sewell.

== Character ==
Alabama's 7th congressional district was first defined in 1843; it has continued since then with the exception of the years 1867–1873 during the Reconstruction era. The geographic area represented by this district has changed over time, depending upon the number of U.S. Representatives apportioned to Alabama. Around the turn of the 20th century, the district included the city of Gadsden. Over time, the district was redefined to include the area around Tuscaloosa. The last two representatives for the district before its reconfiguration as a majority-minority area were Richard Shelby and Claude Harris, both Tuscaloosa residents.

The shape of the current district was largely established in 1992, when it was reconstituted as a majority-minority district under provisions of the Voting Rights Act of 1965, as amended in 1982 to encourage greater representation for minorities in Congress. Half of the western Alabama portion of the district was moved to the 4th district, and a large portion of Tuscaloosa County was moved into the 6th district, which had primarily been based around Birmingham. To counter the loss in population and to create the majority-minority, many counties from the Black Belt region, a rural expanse in Alabama with a high proportion of African-American residents descended from workers on cotton plantations, were added to the district, as was an arm extending from Tuscaloosa roughly along the Interstate 20/59 corridor into Jefferson County to take in most of the black precincts of Birmingham. Most of Birmingham's white residents remained in the 6th district. The three representatives elected from the district following reconfiguration—Earl F. Hilliard, Artur Davis, and Terri Sewell—have all been residents of Birmingham.

Mostly minor changes in the following two redistrictings have not substantially changed the shape of the district. But, western portions of Montgomery County have been restored to this district, including large swaths of inner-city Montgomery in the redistricting following the 2010 census. This area had earlier been removed after the 2000 census. The district contains urbanized areas of Birmingham, Montgomery, and Tuscaloosa, and ten of the fourteen rural counties in the Black Belt. Three of the state's largest colleges are located in the district: Alabama State University in Montgomery, the University of Alabama in Tuscaloosa, and the University of Alabama at Birmingham. Alabama's 7th Congressional district is a good example of a state that has experienced partisan gerrymandering over the last decade. In the 2010 redistricting cycle, Republicans drew district lines to pack together several major Democratic communities into a single district, ensuring that Democrats were only elected to one seat. Alabama's District 7 reaches into several other districts' regions to pick out Democratic voters. The 7th district is the most gerrymandered in the state.

Democrats have represented the 7th district in all but 6 years since 1843.

== Counties and communities ==
For the 119th and successive Congresses (based on the districts drawn following the Supreme Court's decision in Allen v. Milligan), the district contains all or portions of the following counties and communities.

Choctaw County (8)

All eight communities

Clarke County (6)

Coffeeville, Fulton, Grove Hill, Jackson (part; also 2nd), Thomasville, Whatley

Dallas County (4)

All four communities

Greene County (4)

All four communities

Hale County (4)

All four communities

Jefferson County (32)

Adamsville, Bessemer, Birmingham (part; also 6th), Brighton, Brookside, Cardiff, Center Point (part; also 6th), Concord, Edgewater, Fairfield, Forestdale, Fultondale (part; also 6th), Graysville (part; also 6th), Helena (part; also 6th; shared with Shelby County), Homewood (part; also 6th), Hoover (part; also 6th; shared with Shelby County), Hueytown, Irondale (part; also 6th), Lake View (shared with Tuscaloosa County), Lipscomb, Maytown, McCalla, McDonald Chapel, Midfield, Minor, Mulga, North Johns, Pleasant Grove, Rock Creek, Sylvan Springs, Tarrant, West Jefferson

Lowndes County (7)

All seven communities

Marengo County (10)

All 10 communities

Perry County (2)

Marion, Uniontown

Pickens County (9)

All nine communities

Sumter County (9)

All nine communities

Tuscaloosa County (9)

Brookwood, Coaling, Cottondale, Holt (part; also 4th), Lake View (shared with Jefferson County), Moundville (shared with Hale County), Tuscaloosa (part; also 4th), Vance (part; also 6th; shared with Bibb County), Woodstock (part; also 6th; shared with Bibb County)

Wilcox County (7)

All seven communities

== Recent election results from statewide races ==
The following chart shows the results of recent federal and statewide races in the 7th district.

Year	Office	Winner	D %	R %
2012	President	Barack Obama (D)	72.5%	27.0%
2016	President	Hillary Clinton (D)	69.2%	28.5%
2016	Senate	Ron Crumpton (D)	69.2%	30.7%
2017	Senate (special)	Doug Jones (D)	79.4%	19.9%
2018	Governor	Walt Maddox (D)	72.5%	27.4%
2018	Lieutenant Governor	Will Boyd (D)	72.2%	27.7%
2018	Attorney General	Joseph Siegelman (D)	73.5%	26.5%
2020	President	Joe Biden (D)	70.7%	28.3%
2020	Senate	Doug Jones (D)	72.7%	27.2%
Redistricted for the 2022 cycle
2022	Senate	Will Boyd (D)	61.1%	37.2%
2022	Governor	Yolanda Flowers (D)	59.9%	37.4%
2022	Attorney General	Wendell Major (D)	62.2%	37.7%
2022	Secretary of State	Pamela Laffitte (D)	61.6%	36.4%
Redistricted for the 2024 cycle
2024	President	Kamala Harris (D)	61.3%	37.4%

== List of members representing the district ==
Member	Party	Years	Cong ress	Electoral history	Location
District created March 4, 1843
Felix Grundy McConnell (Talladega)	Democratic	March 4, 1843 – September 10, 1846	28th 29th	Elected in 1843. Re-elected in 1845. Died.	1843–1853 [data missing]
Vacant		September 10, 1846 – December 7, 1846	29th		1843–1853 [data missing]
Franklin Welsh Bowdon (Talladega)	Democratic	December 7, 1846 – March 3, 1851	29th 30th 31st	Elected to finish McConnell's term. Re-elected in 1847. Re-elected in 1849. Retired.	1843–1853 [data missing]
Alexander White (Talladega)	Whig	March 4, 1851 – March 3, 1853	32nd	Elected in 1851. Retired.	1843–1853 [data missing]
James Ferguson Dowdell (Chambers)	Democratic	March 4, 1853 – March 3, 1855	33rd	Elected in 1853. Redistricted to the 3rd district.	1853–1863 [data missing]
Sampson Willis Harris (Wetumpka)	Democratic	March 4, 1855 – March 3, 1857	34th	Redistricted from the 3rd district and re-elected in 1855. Retired.	1853–1863 [data missing]
Jabez Lamar Monroe Curry (Talladega)	Democratic	March 4, 1857 – January 21, 1861	35th 36th	Elected in 1857. Re-elected in 1859. Withdrew due to Civil War.	1853–1863 [data missing]
Vacant		January 21, 1861 – March 3, 1863	36th 37th	Members withdrew during the American Civil War.	1853–1863 [data missing]
District eliminated in 1863 and re-established in 1877
William H. Forney (Jacksonville)	Democratic	March 4, 1877 – March 3, 1893	45th 46th 47th 48th 49th 50th 51st 52nd	Redistricted from the at-large district and re-elected in 1876. Re-elected in 1878. Re-elected in 1880. Re-elected in 1882. Re-elected in 1884. Re-elected in 1886. Re-elected in 1888. Re-elected in 1890. Retired.	1877–1893 [data missing]
William Henry Denson (Gadsden)	Democratic	March 4, 1893 – March 3, 1895	53rd	Elected in 1892. Lost renomination.	1893–1903 [data missing]
Milford W. Howard (Fort Payne)	Populist	March 4, 1895 – March 3, 1899	54th 55th	Elected in 1894. Re-elected in 1896. Retired.	1893–1903 [data missing]
John L. Burnett (Gadsden)	Democratic	March 4, 1899 – May 13, 1919	56th 57th 58th 59th 60th 61st 62nd 63rd 64th 65th 66th	Elected in 1898. Re-elected in 1900. Re-elected in 1902. Re-elected in 1904. Re-elected in 1906. Re-elected in 1908. Re-elected in 1910. Re-elected in 1912. Re-elected in 1914. Re-elected in 1916. Re-elected in 1918. Died.	1893–1903 [data missing]
John L. Burnett (Gadsden)	Democratic	March 4, 1899 – May 13, 1919	56th 57th 58th 59th 60th 61st 62nd 63rd 64th 65th 66th	Elected in 1898. Re-elected in 1900. Re-elected in 1902. Re-elected in 1904. Re-elected in 1906. Re-elected in 1908. Re-elected in 1910. Re-elected in 1912. Re-elected in 1914. Re-elected in 1916. Re-elected in 1918. Died.	1913–1933 [data missing]
Vacant		May 13, 1919 – September 30, 1919	66th		1913–1933 [data missing]
Lilius Bratton Rainey (Gadsden)	Democratic	September 30, 1919 – March 3, 1923	66th 67th	Elected to finish Burnett's term. Re-elected in 1920. Retired.	1913–1933 [data missing]
Miles C. Allgood (Allgood)	Democratic	March 4, 1923 – March 3, 1933	68th 69th 70th 71st 72nd	Elected in 1922. Re-elected in 1924. Re-elected in 1926. Re-elected in 1928. Re-elected in 1930. Redistricted to the 5th district.	1913–1933 [data missing]
William B. Bankhead (Jasper)	Democratic	March 4, 1933 – September 15, 1940	73rd 74th 75th 76th	Redistricted from the 10th district and re-elected in 1932. Re-elected in 1934. Re-elected in 1936. Re-elected in 1938. Died.	1933–1943 [data missing]
Vacant		September 15, 1940 – November 5, 1940	76th		1933–1943 [data missing]
Zadoc L. Weatherford (Red Bay)	Democratic	November 5, 1940 – January 3, 1941	76th	Elected to finish William Bankhead's term. Retired.	1933–1943 [data missing]
Walter W. Bankhead (Jasper)	Democratic	January 3, 1941 – February 1, 1941	77th	Elected in 1940. Resigned.	1933–1943 [data missing]
Vacant		February 1, 1941 – June 24, 1941	77th		1933–1943 [data missing]
Carter Manasco (Jasper)	Democratic	June 24, 1941 – January 3, 1949	77th 78th 79th 80th	Elected to finish Walter Bankhead's term. Re-elected in 1942. Re-elected in 1944. Re-elected in 1946. Lost renomination.	1933–1943 [data missing]
Carl Elliott (Jasper)	Democratic	January 3, 1949 – January 3, 1963	81st 82nd 83rd 84th 85th 86th 87th	Elected in 1948. Re-elected in 1950. Re-elected in 1952. Re-elected in 1954. Re-elected in 1956. Re-elected in 1958. Re-elected in 1960. Redistricted to the At-large district.	1953–1963 [data missing]
District inactive		January 3, 1963 – January 3, 1965	88th	All representatives elected at-large on a general ticket.	
James D. Martin (Gadsden)	Republican	January 3, 1965 – January 3, 1967	89th	Elected in 1964. Retired to run for Governor.	1965–1973 [data missing]
Tom Bevill (Jasper)	Democratic	January 3, 1967 – January 3, 1973	90th 91st 92nd	Elected in 1966. Re-elected in 1968. Re-elected in 1970. Redistricted to the 4th district.	1965–1973 [data missing]
Walter Flowers (Tuscaloosa)	Democratic	January 3, 1973 – January 3, 1979	93rd 94th 95th	Redistricted from the 5th district and re-elected in 1972. Re-elected in 1974. Re-elected in 1976. Retired to run for U.S. Senator.	1973–1983 [data missing]
Richard Shelby (Tuscaloosa)	Democratic	January 3, 1979 – January 3, 1987	96th 97th 98th 99th	Elected in 1978. Re-elected in 1980. Re-elected in 1982. Re-elected in 1984. Retired to run for U.S. senator.	1983–1993 [data missing]
Claude Harris Jr. (Tuscaloosa)	Democratic	January 3, 1987 – January 3, 1993	100th 101st 102nd	Elected in 1986. Re-elected in 1988. Re-elected in 1990. Retired.	1983–1993 [data missing]
Earl Hilliard (Birmingham)	Democratic	January 3, 1993 – January 3, 2003	103rd 104th 105th 106th 107th	Elected in 1992. Re-elected in 1994. Re-elected in 1996. Re-elected in 1998. Re-elected in 2000. Lost renomination.	1993–2003 [data missing]
Artur Davis (Birmingham)	Democratic	January 3, 2003 – January 3, 2011	108th 109th 110th 111th	Elected in 2002. Re-elected in 2004. Re-elected in 2006. Re-elected in 2008. Retired to run for Governor.	2003–2013
Terri Sewell (Birmingham)	Democratic	January 3, 2011 – present	112th 113th 114th 115th 116th 117th 118th 119th	Elected in 2010. Re-elected in 2012. Re-elected in 2014. Re-elected in 2016. Re-elected in 2018. Re-elected in 2020. Re-elected in 2022. Re-elected in 2024. Re-elected in 2026.	2003–2013
Terri Sewell (Birmingham)	Democratic	January 3, 2011 – present	112th 113th 114th 115th 116th 117th 118th 119th	Elected in 2010. Re-elected in 2012. Re-elected in 2014. Re-elected in 2016. Re-elected in 2018. Re-elected in 2020. Re-elected in 2022. Re-elected in 2024. Re-elected in 2026.	2013–2023
Terri Sewell (Birmingham)	Democratic	January 3, 2011 – present	112th 113th 114th 115th 116th 117th 118th 119th	Elected in 2010. Re-elected in 2012. Re-elected in 2014. Re-elected in 2016. Re-elected in 2018. Re-elected in 2020. Re-elected in 2022. Re-elected in 2024. Re-elected in 2026.	2023–2025
Terri Sewell (Birmingham)	Democratic	January 3, 2011 – present	112th 113th 114th 115th 116th 117th 118th 119th	Elected in 2010. Re-elected in 2012. Re-elected in 2014. Re-elected in 2016. Re-elected in 2018. Re-elected in 2020. Re-elected in 2022. Re-elected in 2024. Re-elected in 2026.	2025–2027
Terri Sewell (Birmingham)	Democratic	January 3, 2011 – present	112th 113th 114th 115th 116th 117th 118th 119th	Elected in 2010. Re-elected in 2012. Re-elected in 2014. Re-elected in 2016. Re-elected in 2018. Re-elected in 2020. Re-elected in 2022. Re-elected in 2024. Re-elected in 2026.	2027–present

== Recent election results ==
These are the results from the previous twelve election cycles in Alabama's 7th district.

=== 2002 ===
2002 Alabama's 7th congressional district election
Party	Candidate	Votes	%
Democratic	Artur Davis	153,735	92.44
Libertarian	Lauren Orth McCay	12,100	7.28
Write-In	Write-ins	474	0.29
Total votes		166,309	100.00
Democratic hold			

=== 2004 ===
2004 Alabama's 7th congressional district election
Party	Candidate	Votes	%
Democratic	Artur Davis (Incumbent)	183,408	74.97
Republican	Steve Cameron	61,019	24.94
Write-In	Write-ins	211	0.09
Total votes		244,638	100.00
Democratic hold			

=== 2006 ===
2006 Alabama's 7th congressional district election
Party	Candidate	Votes	%
Democratic	Artur Davis (Incumbent)	133,870	99.04
Write-In	Write-ins	1,297	0.96
Total votes		135,167	100.00
Democratic hold			

=== 2008 ===
2008 Alabama's 7th congressional district election
Party	Candidate	Votes	%
Democratic	Artur Davis (Incumbent)	228,518	98.63
Write-In	Write-ins	3,183	1.37
Total votes		231,701	100.00
Democratic hold			

=== 2010 ===
2010 Alabama's 7th congressional district election
Party	Candidate	Votes	%
Democratic	Terri Sewell	136,223	72.42
Republican	Don Chamberlain	51,882	27.58
Total votes		188,105	100.00
Democratic hold			

=== 2012 ===
2012 Alabama's 7th congressional district election
Party	Candidate	Votes	%
Democratic	Terri Sewell (Incumbent)	232,520	75.90
Republican	Don Chamberlain	73,835	24.10
Total votes		306,355	100.00
Democratic hold			

=== 2014 ===
2014 Alabama's 7th congressional district election
Party	Candidate	Votes	%
Democratic	Terri Sewell (Incumbent)	133,687	98.37
Write-in		2,212	1.63
Total votes		135,899	100.00
Democratic hold			

=== 2016 ===
2016 Alabama's 7th congressional district election
Party	Candidate	Votes	%
Democratic	Terri Sewell (Incumbent)	229,330	98.41
Write-in		3,698	1.59
Total votes		233,028	100.00
Democratic hold			

=== 2018 ===
Alabama's 7th congressional district election
Party	Candidate	Votes	%
Democratic	Terri Sewell (Incumbent)	185,010	97.80
Write-in		4,153	2.20
Total votes		189,163	100.00
Democratic hold			

=== 2020 ===
2020 Alabama's 7th congressional district election
Party	Candidate	Votes	%
Democratic	Terri Sewell (incumbent)	225,742	97.16
Write-in		6,589	2.84
Total votes		232,331	100.00
Democratic hold			

=== 2022 ===
2022 Alabama's 7th congressional district election
Party	Candidate	Votes	%
Democratic	Terri Sewell (incumbent)	123,060	63.53
Republican	Beatrice Nichols	67,353	34.77
Libertarian	Gavin Goodman	3,207	1.66
Write-in		79	0.04
Total votes		193,699	100.00
Democratic hold			

=== 2024 ===
2024 Alabama's 7th congressional district election
Party	Candidate	Votes	%
Democratic	Terri Sewell (incumbent)	186,723	63.68
Republican	Robin Litaker	106,312	36.26
Write-in		185	0.06
Total votes		293,220	100.00
Democratic hold			

== See also ==
- Alabama's congressional districts
- List of United States congressional districts

U.S. House of Representatives
Preceded by Tennessee's 5th congressional district	Home district of the speaker of the House; June 4, 1936 – September 15, 1940	Succeeded by Texas's 4th congressional district
