= Alabama's 5th congressional district =

U.S. House district for Alabama

Coordinates: 34°46′39.78″N 86°46′51.62″W

- Interactive map of district boundaries since January 3, 2025 (Note: The district has the same boundary as chosen by the District Court for the Northern District of Alabama in 2023 for the 2024 elections as a result of Allen v. Milligan, and as drawn by the Alabama Legislature in 2026 as a result of Louisiana v. Callais. As such, boundaries of the district will not change at the 2026 elections.)
- Representative: Dale Strong; R–Huntsville
- Area: 4,689 mi^{2} (12,140 km^{2})
- Distribution: 65.53% urban; 34.47% rural
- Population (2025): 790,863
- Median household income: $82,099
- Ethnicity: 67.8% White; 17.4% Black; 6.6% Hispanic; 5.1% Two or more races; 1.8% Asian; 0.8% Native American; 0.4% other
- Occupation: 57.1% White-collar; 29.6% Blue-collar; 13.3% Gray-collar
- Cook PVI: R+15

Alabama's 5th congressional district is a U.S. congressional district in Alabama, which elects a representative to the United States House of Representatives. It encompasses the counties of Lawrence, Limestone, Madison, Morgan, Jackson, and part of Lauderdale. It is currently represented by Republican Dale Strong, a former Madison County Commissioner. Strong was first elected in 2022 following the retirement of Republican incumbent Mo Brooks.

== Character ==
Two major economic projects have lastingly impacted the 5th district and have indelibly dictated the politics of North Alabama for most of the 20th Century. Before 1933, the Northern Alabama counties were characteristically poor, white and rural. The Tennessee Valley Authority's (TVA) arrival changed much of that, slowly transforming the demographic towards technical and engineering employees. The second major project was the space and rocketry programs including Redstone Arsenal in Huntsville where the first large U.S. Ballistic missiles were developed. Additionally, NASA built the Marshall Space Flight Center in the Huntsville-Decatur area during the 1960s. In the late 1950s Northern Alabama came to be dominated by the high-tech and engineering industries, a trend which has continued up to the present. In recent years, the United Launch Alliance has located its research center in Decatur. As a result, Huntsville has become the second largest and fastest growing metropolitan area in Alabama.

For a time, the district bucked the increasing Republican trend in Alabama. It was the only district in the state that supported Walter Mondale in 1984, but hasn't supported a Democrat for president since then. Democrats continue to hold most offices at the local level, and continued to hold most of the district's seats in the Alabama state legislature until the Republicans swept nearly all of north Alabama's seats in 2010. In the mid-1990s, it was a seriously contested seat, with longtime Democratic incumbent Bud Cramer winning reelection by only 1,770 votes in 1994. However, Cramer was elected five more times with 70 percent or more of the vote and even ran unopposed in the Democratic landslide year of 2006. Cramer did not seek reelection in 2008. Parker Griffith, a retired oncologist and State Senator, won the open seat in November 2008. However, in December 2009, Griffith became a Republican. Until Griffith's switch, the district had been one of the last in the former Confederacy not to have sent a Republican to the U.S. Congress since Reconstruction. Griffith was ousted in the Republican primary by former Representative Mo Brooks.

George W. Bush won 60% of the vote in this district in 2004. John McCain also carried the 5th district in 2008 with 60.91% of the vote while Barack Obama received 37.99%.

== Recent election results from statewide races ==
The following chart shows the results of recent federal and statewide races in the 5th district.

Year	Office	Winner	D %	R %
2012	President	Mitt Romney (R)	34.8%	63.7%
2016	President	Donald Trump (R)	30.9%	63.7%
2016	Senate	Richard Shelby (R)	32.8%	67.0%
2017	Senate (special)	Roy Moore (R)	48.7%	48.8%
2018	Governor	Kay Ivey (R)	38.6%	61.3%
2018	Lieutenant Governor	Will Ainsworth (R)	36.9%	63.1%
2018	Attorney General	Steve Marshall (R)	39.1%	60.8%
2020	President	Donald Trump (R)	35.5%	62.5%
2020	Senate	Tommy Tuberville (R)	39.4%	60.3%
Redistricted for the 2022 cycle
2022	Senate	Katie Britt (R)	29.6%	67.5%
2022	Governor	Kay Ivey (R)	27.0%	68.5%
2022	Attorney General	Steve Marshall (R)	31.2%	68.7%
2022	Secretary of State	Wes Allen (R)	29.8%	66.3%
Redistricted for the 2024 cycle
2024	President	Donald Trump (R)	34.6%	63.6%

== Counties and communities within district ==
For the 119th and successive Congresses (based on the districts drawn following the Supreme Court's decision in Allen v. Milligan), the district contains all or portions of the following counties and communities.

Jackson County (13)

All 13 communities

Lauderdale County (3)

Anderson, Lexington, Rogersville

Lawrence County (6)

All six communities

Limestone County (8)

All eight communities

Madison County (12)

All 12 communities

Morgan County (8)

All eight communities

== List of members representing the district ==
Member	Party	Years	Cong ress	Electoral history	Location
District created March 4, 1833
John Murphy (Claiborne)	Jacksonian	March 4, 1833 – March 3, 1835	23rd	Elected in 1832. Retired.	
Francis Strother Lyon (Demopolis)	Anti-Jacksonian	March 4, 1835 – March 3, 1837	24th 25th	Elected in 1834. Re-elected in 1836. Retired.	
Francis Strother Lyon (Demopolis)	Whig	March 4, 1837 – March 3, 1839	24th 25th	Elected in 1834. Re-elected in 1836. Retired.	
James Dellet (Claiborne)	Whig	March 4, 1839 – March 3, 1841	26th	Elected in 1838. Redistricted to the at-large district and lost re-election.	
District inactive		March 4, 1841 – March 3, 1843	27th	All representatives elected at-large.	
George S. Houston (Athens)	Democratic	March 4, 1843 – March 4, 1849	28th 29th 30th	Redistricted from the at-large district and re-elected in 1842. Re-elected in 1844. Re-elected in 1846. Retired.	
David Hubbard (Kinlock)	Democratic	March 4, 1849 – March 3, 1851	31st	Elected in 1848. Lost re-election.	
George S. Houston (Athens)	Democratic	March 4, 1851 – January 21, 1861	32nd 33rd 34th 35th 36th	Elected in 1850. Re-elected in 1852. Re-elected in 1854. Re-elected in 1856. Re-elected in 1858. Withdrew due to Civil War.	
Vacant		January 21, 1861 – July 21, 1868	36th 37th 38th 39th 40th	Civil War and Reconstruction	
John Benton Callis (Huntsville)	Republican	July 21, 1868 – March 3, 1869	40th	Elected to finish the vacant term. Retired.	
Peter Myndert Dox (Huntsville)	Democratic	March 4, 1869 – March 3, 1873	41st 42nd	Elected in 1868. Re-elected in 1870. Retired.	
John Henry Caldwell (Jacksonville)	Democratic	March 4, 1873 – March 3, 1877	43rd 44th	Elected in 1872. Re-elected in 1874. Retired.	
Robert F. Ligon (Tuskegee)	Democratic	March 4, 1877 – March 3, 1879	45th	Elected in 1876. Lost renomination.	
Thomas Williams (Wetumpka)	Democratic	March 4, 1879 – March 3, 1885	46th 47th 48th	Elected in 1878. Re-elected in 1880. Re-elected in 1882. Retired.	
Thomas William Sadler (Prattville)	Democratic	March 4, 1885 – March 3, 1887	49th	Elected in 1884. Lost renomination.	
James E. Cobb (Tuskegee)	Democratic	March 4, 1887 – April 21, 1896	50th 51st 52nd 53rd 54th	Elected in 1886. Re-elected in 1888. Re-elected in 1890. Re-elected in 1892. Lost 1894 contested election.	
Albert Taylor Goodwyn (Robinson Springs)	Populist	April 21, 1896 – March 3, 1897	54th	Won 1894 contested election. Lost re-election.	
Willis Brewer (Hayneville)	Democratic	March 4, 1897 – March 3, 1901	55th 56th	Elected in 1896. Re-elected in 1898. Lost renomination.	
Charles Winston Thompson (Tuskegee)	Democratic	March 4, 1901 – March 20, 1904	57th 58th	Elected in 1900. Re-elected in 1902. Died.	
Vacant		March 20, 1904 – May 19, 1904	58th		
James Thomas Heflin (Lafayette)	Democratic	May 19, 1904 – November 1, 1920	58th 59th 60th 61st 62nd 63rd 64th 65th 66th	Elected to finish Thompson's term. Re-elected in 1904. Re-elected in 1906. Re-elected in 1908. Re-elected in 1910. Re-elected in 1912. Re-elected in 1914. Re-elected in 1916. Re-elected in 1918. Retired to run for U.S. senator and resigned when elected.	
Vacant		November 1, 1920 – December 14, 1920	66th		
William B. Bowling (Lafayette)	Democratic	December 14, 1920 – August 16, 1928	66th 67th 68th 69th 70th	Elected to finish Heflin's term. Also elected to the next full term. Re-elected in 1922. Re-elected in 1924. Re-elected in 1926. Resigned to become judge for 5th Alabama Circuit.	
Vacant		August 16, 1928 – November 6, 1928	70th		
LaFayette L. Patterson (Gadsden)	Democratic	November 6, 1928 – March 3, 1933	70th 71st 72nd	Elected to finish Bowling's term. Also elected to the next term the same day in 1928. Re-elected in 1930. Lost renomination.	
Miles C. Allgood (Gadsden)	Democratic	March 4, 1933 – January 3, 1935	73rd	Redistricted from the 7th district and re-elected in 1932. Lost renomination.	
Joe Starnes (Guntersville)	Democratic	January 3, 1935 – January 3, 1945	74th 75th 76th 77th 78th	Elected in 1934. Re-elected in 1936. Re-elected in 1938. Re-elected in 1940. Re-elected in 1942. Lost renomination.	
Albert Rains (Gadsden)	Democratic	January 3, 1945 – January 3, 1963	79th 80th 81st 82nd 83rd 84th 85th 86th 87th	Elected in 1944. Re-elected in 1946. Re-elected in 1948. Re-elected in 1950. Re-elected in 1952. Re-elected in 1954. Re-elected in 1956. Re-elected in 1958. Re-elected in 1960. Redistricted to the at-large district.	
District inactive		January 3, 1963 – January 3, 1965	88th	All representatives elected at-large.	
Armistead I. Selden Jr. (Greensboro)	Democratic	January 3, 1965 – January 3, 1969	89th 90th	Redistricted from the at-large district and re-elected in 1964. Re-elected in 1966. Retired to run for U.S. senator.	
Walter Flowers (Tuscaloosa)	Democratic	January 3, 1969 – January 3, 1973	91st 92nd	Elected in 1968. Re-elected in 1970. Redistricted to the 7th district.	
Robert E. Jones Jr. (Scottsboro)	Democratic	January 3, 1973 – January 3, 1977	93rd 94th	Redistricted from the 8th district and re-elected in 1972. Re-elected in 1974. Retired.	1973–1983 [data missing]
Ronnie Flippo (Florence)	Democratic	January 3, 1977 – January 3, 1991	95th 96th 97th 98th 99th 100th 101st	Elected in 1976. Re-elected in 1978. Re-elected in 1980. Re-elected in 1982. Re-elected in 1984. Re-elected in 1986. Re-elected in 1988. Retired to run for Governor of Alabama.	1973–1983 [data missing]
Ronnie Flippo (Florence)	Democratic	January 3, 1977 – January 3, 1991	95th 96th 97th 98th 99th 100th 101st	Elected in 1976. Re-elected in 1978. Re-elected in 1980. Re-elected in 1982. Re-elected in 1984. Re-elected in 1986. Re-elected in 1988. Retired to run for Governor of Alabama.	1983–1993 [data missing]
Robert E. Cramer (Huntsville)	Democratic	January 3, 1991 – January 3, 2009	102nd 103rd 104th 105th 106th 107th 108th 109th 110th	Elected in 1990. Re-elected in 1992. Re-elected in 1994. Re-elected in 1996. Re-elected in 1998. Re-elected in 2000. Re-elected in 2002. Re-elected in 2004. Re-elected in 2006. Retired.	1983–1993 [data missing]
Robert E. Cramer (Huntsville)	Democratic	January 3, 1991 – January 3, 2009	102nd 103rd 104th 105th 106th 107th 108th 109th 110th	Elected in 1990. Re-elected in 1992. Re-elected in 1994. Re-elected in 1996. Re-elected in 1998. Re-elected in 2000. Re-elected in 2002. Re-elected in 2004. Re-elected in 2006. Retired.	1993–2003 [data missing]
Robert E. Cramer (Huntsville)	Democratic	January 3, 1991 – January 3, 2009	102nd 103rd 104th 105th 106th 107th 108th 109th 110th	Elected in 1990. Re-elected in 1992. Re-elected in 1994. Re-elected in 1996. Re-elected in 1998. Re-elected in 2000. Re-elected in 2002. Re-elected in 2004. Re-elected in 2006. Retired.	2003–2013
Parker Griffith (Huntsville)	Democratic	January 3, 2009 – December 22, 2009	111th	Elected in 2008. Switched parties. Lost renomination.	2003–2013
Parker Griffith (Huntsville)	Republican	December 22, 2009 – January 3, 2011	111th	Elected in 2008. Switched parties. Lost renomination.	2003–2013
Mo Brooks (Huntsville)	Republican	January 3, 2011 – January 3, 2023	112th 113th 114th 115th 116th 117th	Elected in 2010. Re-elected in 2012. Re-elected in 2014. Re-elected in 2016. Re-elected in 2018. Re-elected in 2020. Retired to run for U.S. Senator.	2003–2013
Mo Brooks (Huntsville)	Republican	January 3, 2011 – January 3, 2023	112th 113th 114th 115th 116th 117th	Elected in 2010. Re-elected in 2012. Re-elected in 2014. Re-elected in 2016. Re-elected in 2018. Re-elected in 2020. Retired to run for U.S. Senator.	2013–2023
Dale Strong (Huntsville)	Republican	January 3, 2023 – present	118th 119th	Elected in 2022. Re-elected in 2024. Re-elected in 2026.	2023–2025
Dale Strong (Huntsville)	Republican	January 3, 2023 – present	118th 119th	Elected in 2022. Re-elected in 2024. Re-elected in 2026.	2025–present

== Recent election results ==
These are the results from the previous twelve election cycles in Alabama's 5th district.

=== 2002 ===
2002 Alabama's 5th congressional district election
Party	Candidate	Votes	%
Democratic	Robert E. Cramer (incumbent)	142,029	73.15
Republican	Stephen P. Engel	48,226	24.84
Libertarian	Alan F. Barksdale	3,772	1.94
Write-in		144	0.07
Total votes		194,171	100.00
Democratic hold			

=== 2004 ===
2004 Alabama's 5th congressional district election
Party	Candidate	Votes	%
Democratic	Robert E. Cramer (incumbent)	200,999	72.97
Republican	Gerald "Gerry" Wallace	74,145	26.92
Write-in		315	0.11
Total votes		275,459	100.00
Democratic hold			

=== 2006 ===
2006 Alabama's 5th congressional district election
Party	Candidate	Votes	%
Democratic	Robert E. Cramer (incumbent)	143,015	98.25
Write-in		2,540	1.75
Total votes		145,555	100.00
Democratic hold			

=== 2008 ===
2008 Alabama's 5th congressional district election
Party	Candidate	Votes	%
Democratic	Parker Griffith	158,324	51.52
Republican	Wayne Parker	147,314	47.94
Write-in		1,644	0.54
Total votes		307,282	100.00
Democratic hold			

=== 2010 ===
2010 Alabama's 5th congressional district election
Party	Candidate	Votes	%
Republican	Mo Brooks	131,109	57.89
Democratic	Steve Raby	95,192	42.03
Write-in		189	0.08
Total votes		226,490	100.00
Republican hold			

=== 2012 ===
2012 Alabama's 5th congressional district election
Party	Candidate	Votes	%
Republican	Mo Brooks (incumbent)	189,185	64.95
Democratic	Charlie L. Holley	101,772	34.94
Write-in		336	0.12
Total votes		291,293	100.00
Republican hold			

=== 2014 ===
2014 Alabama's 5th congressional district election
Party	Candidate	Votes	%
Republican	Mo Brooks (incumbent)	115,338	74.42
Independent	Mark Bray	39,005	25.17
Write-in		631	0.41
Total votes		154,974	100.00
Republican hold			

=== 2016 ===
2016 Alabama's 5th congressional district election
Party	Candidate	Votes	%
Republican	Mo Brooks (incumbent)	205,647	66.70
Democratic	Willie "Will" Boyd, Jr.	102,234	33.16
Write-in		445	0.14
Total votes		308,326	100.00
Republican hold			

=== 2018 ===
2018 Alabama's 5th congressional district election
Party	Candidate	Votes	%
Republican	Mo Brooks (incumbent)	159,063	61.02
Democratic	Peter Joffrion	101,388	38.89
Write-in		222	0.09
Total votes		260,673	100.00
Republican hold			

=== 2020 ===
2020 Alabama's 5th congressional district election
Party	Candidate	Votes	%
Republican	Mo Brooks (incumbent)	253,094	95.81
Write-in		11,066	4.19
Total votes		264,160	100.00
Republican hold			

=== 2022 ===
2022 Alabama's 5th congressional district election
Party	Candidate	Votes	%
Republican	Dale Strong	142,435	67.09
Democratic	Kathy Warner-Stanton	62,740	29.55
Libertarian	P. J. Greer	6,773	3.19
Write-in		369	0.17
Total votes		212,317	100.00
Republican hold			

=== 2024 ===
2024 Alabama's 5th congressional district election
Party	Candidate	Votes	%
Republican	Dale Strong (incumbent)	250,322	95.39
Write-in		12,088	4.61
Total votes		262,410	100.00
Republican hold			

== See also ==
- Alabama's congressional districts
- List of United States congressional districts
