= Judy L. Bonner =

American academic

28th President of the University of Alabama
- In office November 1, 2012 – July 15, 2015
- Preceded by: Guy Bailey
- Succeeded by: Stuart R. Bell

Personal details
- Born: Wilcox County, Alabama, U.S.
- Relatives: Jo Bonner (brother)
- Education: University of Alabama (BS, MS); Ohio State University (PhD)

Judy L. Bonner is an American academic who served as president of the University of Alabama in Tuscaloosa, Alabama from 2012 to 2015.

== Early life and education ==
Judy L. Bonner was born in Wilcox County, Alabama. She graduated from the University of Alabama, where she received bachelor's and master's degrees. She received a PhD in Nutrition from Ohio State University in Columbus, Ohio.

Her brother, Jo Bonner, served as a Republican member of the United States House of Representatives from 2003 to 2013.

== Career ==
Bonner started her career as a faculty member of the University of Alabama in 1981. She became the dean of its College of Human Environmental Sciences in 1989. She became the provost and executive vice president of the University of Alabama in 2003.

She served as the president of the University of Alabama from 2012 to 2015. She was the university's first female president.

From 2016 to 2019, Bonner was the provost and executive vice president for Mississippi State University.
