= Belle Fontaine, Mobile County, Alabama =

Unincorporated community in Alabama, United States

Belle Fontaine, Alabama
- Unincorporated community Census-designated place
- Location in Mobile County, Alabama
- Coordinates: 30°29′47″N 88°06′43″W
- Country: United States
- State: Alabama
- County: Mobile

Area
  - Total: 1.92 sq mi (4.96 km^{2})
  - Land: 1.55 sq mi (4.02 km^{2})
  - Water: 0.36 sq mi (0.94 km^{2})
- Elevation: 23 ft (7.0 m)

Population (2020)
  - Total: 613
  - Density: 394.7/sq mi (152.38/km^{2})
- Time zone: UTC-6 (Central (CST))
  - Summer (DST): UTC-5 (CDT)
- ZIP code: 36582
- Area code: 251
- GNIS feature ID: 2632282
- FIPS code: 01-05212

Belle Fontaine (/ˌbɛl fɒnˈtɛn/; French: [bɛl fɔ̃ˈtɛn]) is an unincorporated community and census-designated place (CDP) in Mobile County, Alabama, United States, on the western shore of Mobile Bay. It is located south of the city of Mobile, along the stretch of shore between the Deer River and the Fowl River. As of the 2020 census, its population was 613.

The Belle Fontaine shoreline experiences the occasional jubilee, a rare phenomenon in which fish and crustaceans swarm in the water, just off the beach.

== Demographics ==
Historical population
Census	Pop.	Note	%±
2010	608		—
2020	613		0.8%
U.S. Decennial Census

Belle Fontaine was listed as a census designated place in the 2010 U.S. census.

Belle Fontaine CDP, Alabama – Racial and ethnic composition Note: the US Census treats Hispanic/Latino as an ethnic category. This table excludes Latinos from the racial categories and assigns them to a separate category. Hispanics/Latinos may be of any race.
Race / Ethnicity (NH = Non-Hispanic)	Pop 2010	Pop 2020	% 2010	% 2020
White alone (NH)	552	509	90.79%	83.03%
Black or African American alone (NH)	10	8	1.64%	1.31%
Native American or Alaska Native alone (NH)	3	8	0.49%	1.31%
Asian alone (NH)	14	2	2.30%	0.33%
Native Hawaiian or Pacific Islander alone (NH)	0	0	0.00%	0.00%
Other race alone (NH)	0	0	0.00%	0.00%
Mixed race or Multiracial (NH)	7	49	1.15%	7.99%
Hispanic or Latino (any race)	22	37	3.62%	6.04%
Total	608	613	100.00%	100.00%
