= 2006 United States House of Representatives elections in Alabama =

- November 7, 2006

All 7 Alabama seats to the United States House of Representatives
	Majority party	Minority party
Party	Republican	Democratic
Last election	5	2
Seats won	5	2
Seat change	Steady	Steady
Popular vote	627,501	502,046
Percentage	55.04%	44.03%
Swing	▼5.16%	▲3.53%

Republican
50–60%
60–70%
70–80%
80–90%
>90%
Democratic
50–60%
60–70%
70–80%
>90%

The 2006 United States House of Representatives elections in Alabama were held on November 7, 2006, to determine the representation of the state of Alabama in the United States House of Representatives. The winning candidates would serve a two-year term, from January 3, 2007, to January 3, 2009. The primary elections were held on Tuesday, June 6, 2006.

== Overview ==
2006 United States House of Representatives elections in Alabama
Party	Votes	Percentage	Seats	+/–
Republican	627,501	55.04%	5	—
Democratic	502,046	44.03%	2	—
Independents	10,605	0.93%	0	—
Totals	1,140,152	100.00%	7	—

== District 1 ==
2006 Alabama's 1st congressional district election
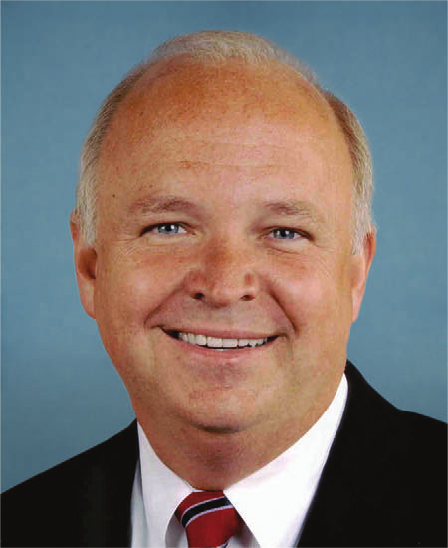

Nominee	Jo Bonner	Vivian Sheffield Beckerle
Party	Republican	Democratic
Popular vote	112,944	52,770
Percentage	68.1%	31.8%
U.S. Representative before election
Jo Bonner (inc.)
Republican
Elected U.S. Representative
Jo Bonner
Republican

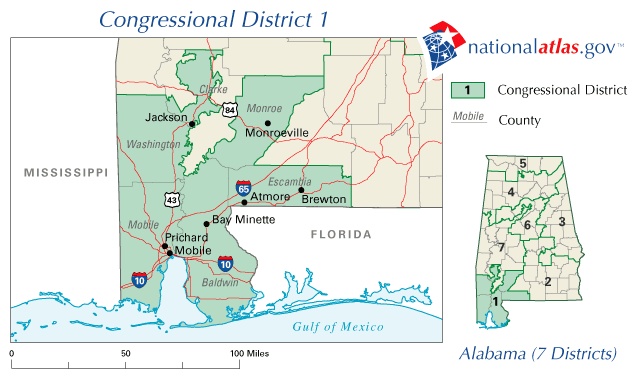

In this conservative district based in the Gulf Coast region of Alabama, incumbent Republican Congressman Jo Bonner easily dispatched his Democratic challenger, Vivian Sheffield Beckerle, receiving nearly seventy percent of the vote to win a third term in Congress.

=== Predictions ===
Source	Ranking	As of
The Cook Political Report	Safe R	November 6, 2006
Rothenberg	Safe R	November 6, 2006
Sabato's Crystal Ball	Safe R	November 6, 2006
Real Clear Politics	Safe R	November 7, 2006
CQ Politics	Safe R	November 7, 2006

=== Results ===
Alabama's 1st congressional district election, 2006
Party	Candidate	Votes	%
Republican	Jo Bonner (inc.)	112,944	68.10
Democratic	Vivian Sheffield Beckerle	52,770	31.82
Write-ins		127	0.08
Total votes		165,841	100.00
Republican hold			

== District 2 ==
2006 Alabama's 2nd congressional district election
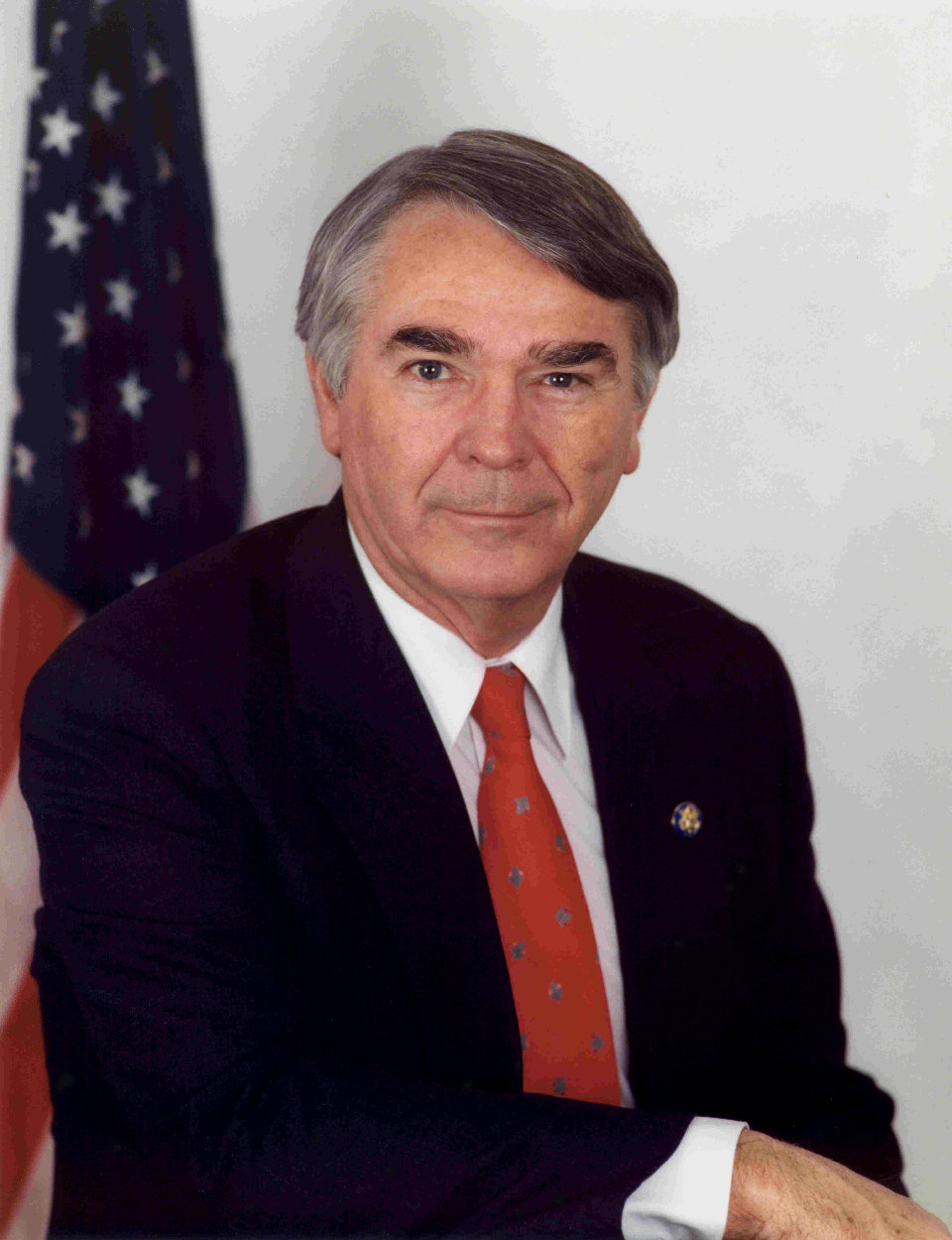

Nominee	Terry Everett	Chuck James
Party	Republican	Democratic
Popular vote	124,302	54,450
Percentage	69.5%	30.4%
U.S. Representative before election
Terry Everett (inc.)
Republican
Elected U.S. Representative
Terry Everett
Republican

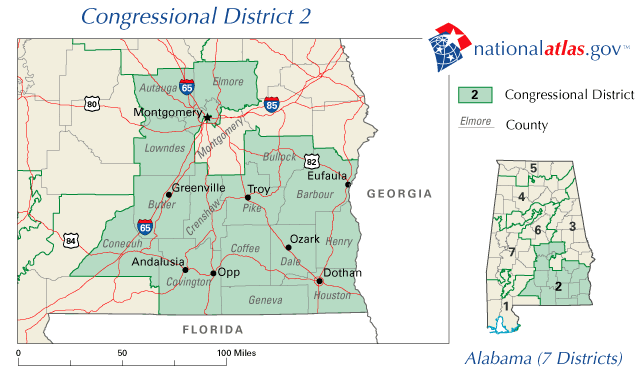

Seeking an eighth term in Congress, incumbent Republican Congressman Terry Everett trumped the Democratic nominee, Chuck James, in this very conservative district based in the suburbs of Montgomery and southeastern Alabama with almost seventy percent of the vote, securing what would be Everett's last term in Congress before retiring.

=== Predictions ===
Source	Ranking	As of
The Cook Political Report	Safe R	November 6, 2006
Rothenberg	Safe R	November 6, 2006
Sabato's Crystal Ball	Safe R	November 6, 2006
Real Clear Politics	Safe R	November 7, 2006
CQ Politics	Safe R	November 7, 2006

=== Results ===
Alabama's 2nd congressional district election, 2006
Party	Candidate	Votes	%
Republican	Terry Everett (inc.)	124,302	69.47
Democratic	Chuck James	54,450	30.43
Write-ins		167	0.09
Total votes		178,919	100.00
Republican hold			

== District 3 ==
2006 Alabama's 3rd congressional district election
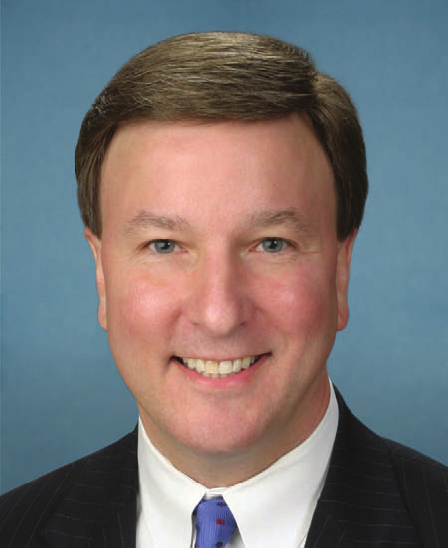

Nominee	Mike D. Rogers	Greg A. Pierce
Party	Republican	Democratic
Popular vote	98,257	63,559
Percentage	59.4%	38.5%
U.S. Representative before election
Mike D. Rogers (inc.)
Republican
Elected U.S. Representative
Mike D. Rogers
Republican

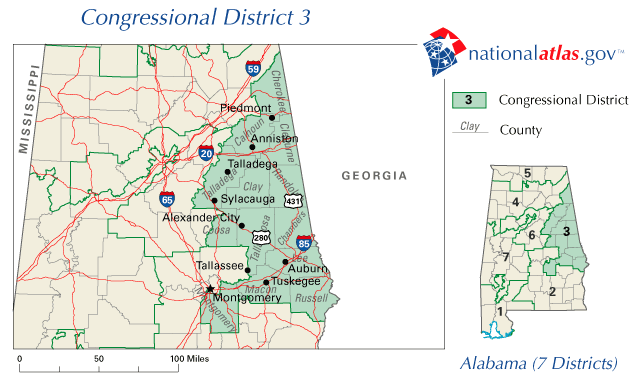

This district, stretching from north to south on the eastern edge of Alabama, is Republican-leaning, but not so much as the other Republican-controlled districts. In that spirit, incumbent Republican Congressman Mike D. Rogers, seeking a third term in Congress, was re-elected over Democratic opponent Greg Pierce and independent challenger Mark Layfield, albeit by the thinnest margin of any member of the Alabama congressional delegation.

=== Predictions ===
Source	Ranking	As of
The Cook Political Report	Safe R	November 6, 2006
Rothenberg	Safe R	November 6, 2006
Sabato's Crystal Ball	Safe R	November 6, 2006
Real Clear Politics	Safe R	November 7, 2006
CQ Politics	Safe R	November 7, 2006

=== Results ===
Alabama's 3rd congressional district election, 2006
Party	Candidate	Votes	%
Republican	Mike D. Rogers (inc.)	98,257	59.44
Democratic	Greg A. Pierce	63,559	38.45
Independent	Mark Edwin Layfield	3,414	2.07
Write-ins		71	0.04
Total votes		165,301	100.00
Republican hold			

== District 4 ==
2006 Alabama's 4th congressional district election
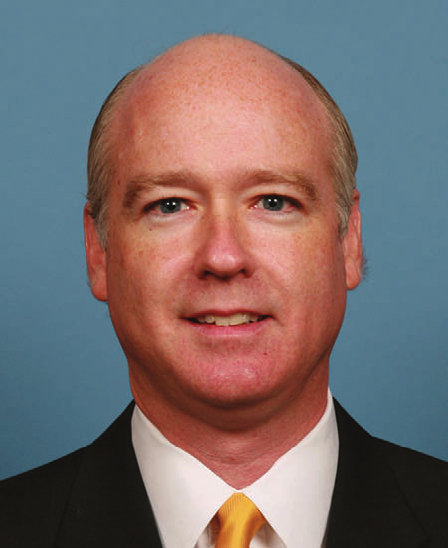

Nominee	Robert Aderholt	Barbara Bobo
Party	Republican	Democratic
Popular vote	128,484	54,382
Percentage	70.2%	29.7%
U.S. Representative before election
Robert Aderholt (inc.)
Republican
Elected U.S. Representative
Robert Aderholt
Republican

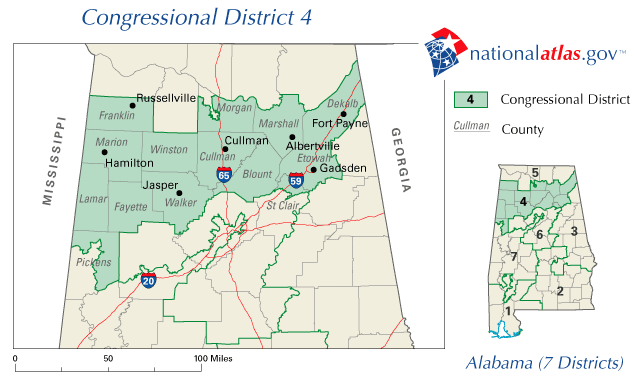

In this north Alabama district, the fifth-most conservative in the United States, incumbent Republican Congressman Robert Aderholt won a sixth term in Congress over Democratic nominee Barbara Bobo, defeating her with over seventy percent of the vote.

=== Predictions ===
Source	Ranking	As of
The Cook Political Report	Safe R	November 6, 2006
Rothenberg	Safe R	November 6, 2006
Sabato's Crystal Ball	Safe R	November 6, 2006
Real Clear Politics	Safe R	November 7, 2006
CQ Politics	Safe R	November 7, 2006

=== Results ===
Alabama's 4th congressional district election, 2006
Party	Candidate	Votes	%
Republican	Robert Aderholt (inc.)	128,484	70.18
Democratic	Barbara Bobo	54,382	29.71
Write-ins		206	0.11
Total votes		183,072	100.00
Republican hold			

== District 5 ==
2006 Alabama's 5th congressional district election
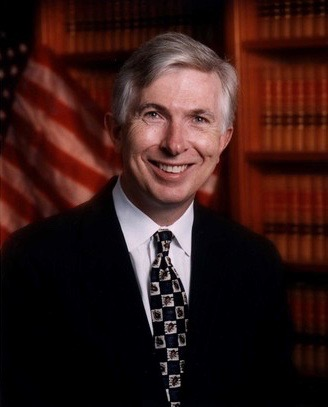
Nominee	Bud Cramer
Party	Democratic
Popular vote	143,015
Percentage	98.3%
U.S. Representative before election
Bud Cramer (inc.)
Democratic
Elected U.S. Representative
Bud Cramer
Democratic

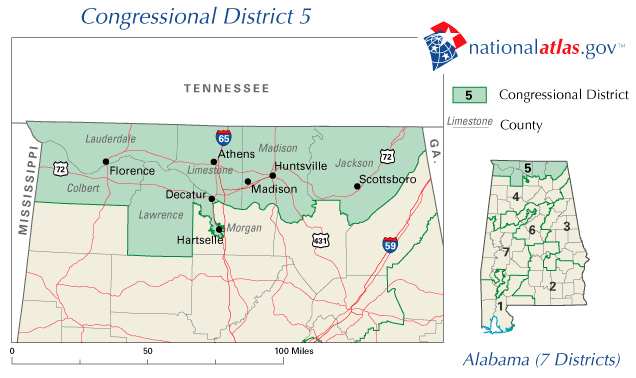

This district, found on the northernmost edge of Alabama, had not elected a Republican to Congress since Reconstruction, despite its strong proclivity towards Republican candidates at the national level and the socially conservative views of its residents. Long-time incumbent Democratic Congressman Bud Cramer had an especially easy time seeking a ninth term in Congress, with no opponents.

=== Predictions ===
Source	Ranking	As of
The Cook Political Report	Safe D	November 6, 2006
Rothenberg	Safe D	November 6, 2006
Sabato's Crystal Ball	Safe D	November 6, 2006
Real Clear Politics	Safe D	November 7, 2006
CQ Politics	Safe D	November 7, 2006

=== Results ===
Alabama's 5th congressional district election, 2006
Party	Candidate	Votes	%
Democratic	Bud Cramer (inc.)	143,015	98.25
Write-ins		2,540	1.75
Total votes		145,555	100.00
Democratic hold			

== District 6 ==
2006 Alabama's 6th congressional district election
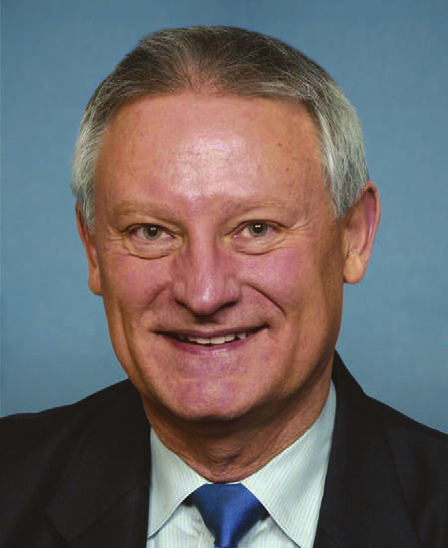
Nominee	Spencer Bachus
Party	Republican
Popular vote	163,514
Percentage	98.3%
U.S. Representative before election
Spencer Bachus (inc.)
Republican
Elected U.S. Representative
Gary Palmer
Republican

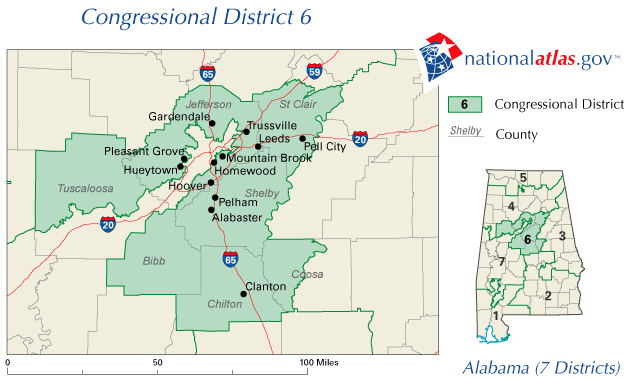

This district, considered by the Cook Partisan Voting Index to be the most conservative congressional district in the country, owes its strong allegiance to Republicans to tapping the highly conservative residents of the Birmingham suburbs. To that effect, incumbent Republican Congressman Spencer Bachus won an eighth term in Congress with no opponents.

=== Predictions ===
Source	Ranking	As of
The Cook Political Report	Safe R	November 6, 2006
Rothenberg	Safe R	November 6, 2006
Sabato's Crystal Ball	Safe R	November 6, 2006
Real Clear Politics	Safe R	November 7, 2006
CQ Politics	Safe R	November 7, 2006

=== Results ===
Alabama's 6th congressional district election, 2006
Party	Candidate	Votes	%
Republican	Spencer Bachus (inc.)	163,514	98.32
Write-ins		2,786	1.68
Total votes		166,300	100.00
Republican hold			

== District 7 ==
2006 Alabama's 7th congressional district election
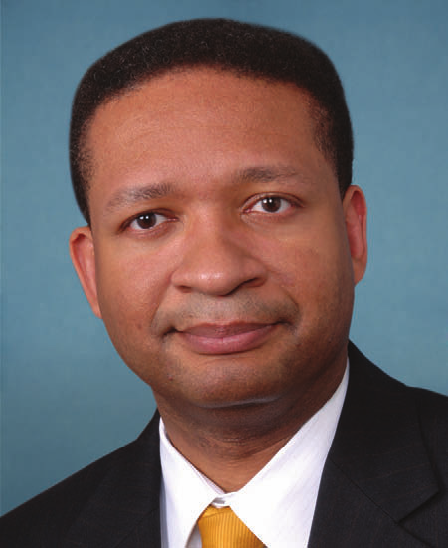
Nominee	Artur Davis
Party	Democratic
Popular vote	133,870
Percentage	99.0%
U.S. Representative before election
Artur Davis (inc.)
Democratic
Elected U.S. Representative
Artur Davis
Democratic

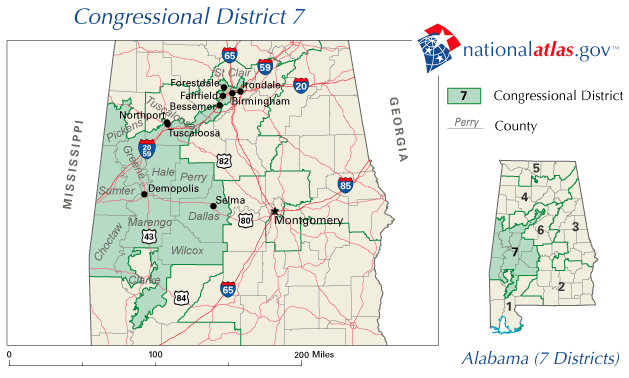

Incumbent Democratic Congressman Artur Davis sought a third term in this liberal district that is mainly rooted in western Alabama but reaches into some portions of Birmingham. This is the most liberal and only majority-black district in Alabama, and as such, Davis won his third term with no opponents.

=== Predictions ===
Source	Ranking	As of
The Cook Political Report	Safe D	November 6, 2006
Rothenberg	Safe D	November 6, 2006
Sabato's Crystal Ball	Safe D	November 6, 2006
Real Clear Politics	Safe D	November 7, 2006
CQ Politics	Safe D	November 7, 2006

=== Results ===
Alabama's 7th congressional district election, 2006
Party	Candidate	Votes	%
Democratic	Artur Davis (inc.)	133,870	99.04
Write-ins		1,294	0.96
Total votes		135,164	100.00
Democratic hold			
