= Bud Cramer =

American politician (born 1947)

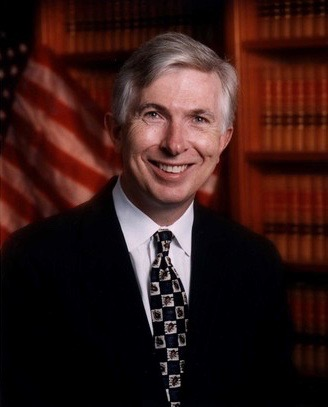

Member of the U.S. House of Representatives from Alabama's 5th district
- In office January 3, 1991 – January 3, 2009
- Preceded by: Ronnie Flippo
- Succeeded by: Parker Griffith

District Attorney of Madison County
- In office 1981–1991
- Preceded by: Fred Simpson
- Succeeded by: Mo Brooks

Personal details
- Born: Robert Edward Cramer Jr. August 22, 1947 (age 78) Huntsville, Alabama, U.S.
- Party: Democratic
- Children: 1
- Education: University of Alabama (BA, JD)

Military service
- Branch/service: United States Army
- Years of service: 1972–1978
- Unit: United States Army Reserve

Robert Edward "Bud" Cramer Jr. (born August 22, 1947) is an American politician who was a Democratic member of the United States House of Representatives from 1991 to 2009, representing Alabama's 5th congressional district. On March 13, 2008, Cramer announced he would not seek re-election to a 10th term.

== Early life ==
Cramer was born and raised in Huntsville, Alabama. Known as Bud by his classmates, he earned a Bachelor of Arts in 1969 and a Juris Doctor degree from the University of Alabama School of Law in 1972. After graduating, he joined the Army as a tank officer. He served at Fort Knox, Kentucky, and remained a member of the Army Reserve from 1976 to 1978.

== Early political career ==
In 1973, Cramer was appointed assistant district attorney in Madison County, a position he held until going into private practice in 1975. He remained in private practice until 1980, when he challenged the incumbent Madison County District Attorney and won at age 33.

In 1985, he founded the National Children's Advocacy Center, a child-friendly environment for abused children, an effort for which he was honored at the White House by President Ronald Reagan in 1987.

== Congress ==
=== Congressional elections ===
Cramer was district attorney from 1981 to 1990, until Rep. Ronnie Flippo ran unsuccessfully for governor. Cramer ran for the vacant Congressional seat in 1990, defeating Republican Al McDonald with 67% of the vote. He was handily reelected in 1992. However, he was nearly defeated in 1994 by Republican businessman Wayne Parker—the closest that a Republican had come to winning one of the few remaining districts (prior to 2010) in the former Confederacy to have never elected a Republican since Reconstruction. Cramer only held onto his seat by 1,770 votes. Cramer managed to defeat Parker with less difficulty in 1996 and never faced serious opposition again, winning five more terms by over 70 percent of the vote before running unopposed in 2006.

=== Tenure ===
In the House, Cramer was a supporter of the International Space Station and an advocate for spending increases in missile defense, as Huntsville has long been a center for research and development of these two projects, as Redstone Arsenal—located in the district—is home of the United States Army Aviation and Missile Command (AMCOM) and NASA's Marshall Space Flight Center.

A liberal in his early days, he largely supported the Democratic line for his first three terms. The 1994 near-defeat, however, led Cramer to move more to the right in his voting. He often broke with his party on issues such as abortion, gay rights, gun control, taxes, regulation of business, and the environment. Cramer was one of only four Democrats in the House to vote for the tax cut bill of 2003. However, unlike a few other conservative Democrats, he did not vote in favor of any of the articles of impeachment against President Bill Clinton.

Cramer's voting record placed him near the center of the House; however, he was often cited as unpredictable in his votes. Child protection was a longtime legislative project of Cramer's pursuant to his work with the area prior to his ascent to the House.

Cramer was a long-time member of the Blue Dog Democrats, a coalition of conservative and moderate House Democrats. Because of his largely conservative positions, he was encouraged by fellow Alabama politician Sen. Richard Shelby to make the same switch that he did and register as a Republican. Cramer resisted these efforts, and won reelection easily in his increasingly conservative district despite his party affiliation.

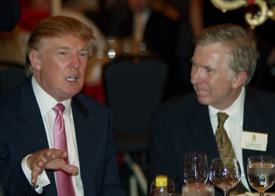
Cramer with Donald Trump in 2005

On October 10, 2002, Cramer was among the 81 House Democrats who voted in favor of authorizing the invasion of Iraq. He also voted in favor of some measures favored by the Republican majority, including the continued occupation of Iraq and re-authorization of the Patriot Act. However, Cramer joined fellow Democrats in opposing President Bush's plan to send 21,000 additional troops to Iraq.

=== Committees ===
- House Committee on Appropriations
  - Subcommittee on Defense
  - Subcommittee on Transportation, Housing and Urban Development, and Related Agencies
  - Subcommittee on Financial Services and General Government
  - The Select Intelligence Oversight Panel
- Permanent Select Committee on Intelligence
  - Subcommittee on Oversight and Investigations (Chairman)
  - Subcommittee on Technical & Tactical Intelligence
- The Blue Dog Coalition, Co-Founder
- The Congressional Missing & Exploited Children's Caucus, Co-Chairman and Co-Founder
- The End the Death Tax Caucus, Co-Chairman and Co-Founder
- The House Anti-Terrorism Caucus, Co-Chairman and Co-Founder
- The Tennessee Valley Authority Caucus, Co-Chairman

== Retirement ==
On March 13, 2008, Cramer surprised colleagues by announcing that he would not seek re-election in 2008 and would retire at the end of his term. Alabama’s Democratic State Senator Parker Griffith defeated Republican Wayne Parker in the race to succeed Cramer.

Since leaving Congress, Cramer has worked as a lobbyist and government affairs consultant, representing clients in the defense and aerospace industries.

== Electoral history ==
Alabama's 5th congressional district election, 1990
Party	Candidate	Votes	%
Democratic	Robert E. Cramer	113,047	67.1
Republican	Albert McDonald	55,326	32.9
Write-in		10	0.0
Total votes		168,383	100.0
Democratic hold			

Alabama's 5th congressional district election, 1992
Party	Candidate	Votes	%
Democratic	Robert E. Cramer (incumbent)	160,060	65.6
Republican	Terry Smith	77,951	31.9
Libertarian	C. Michael Seibert	6,006	2.5
Write-in		116	0.0
Total votes		244,133	100.0
Democratic hold			

Alabama's 5th congressional district, 1994
Party	Candidate	Votes	%
Democratic	Robert E. Cramer (incumbent)	88,693	50.5
Republican	Wayne Parker	86,923	49.5
Write-in		77	0.0
Total votes		175,693	100.0
Democratic hold			

Alabama's 5th congressional district election, 1996
Party	Candidate	Votes	%
Democratic	Robert E. Cramer (incumbent)	114,442	55.7
Republican	Wayne Parker	86,727	42.2
Natural Law	Shirley Madison	2,484	1.2
Libertarian	Craig Goodrich	1,856	0.9
Write-in		38	0.0
Total votes		205,547	100.0
Democratic hold			

Alabama's 5th congressional election, 1998
Party	Candidate	Votes	%
Democratic	Robert E. Cramer (incumbent)	134,819	69.7
Republican	Gil Aust	58,536	30.3
Write-in		135	0.1
Total votes		193,490	100.0
Democratic hold			

Alabama's 5th congressional district election, 2000
Party	Candidate	Votes	%
Democratic	Robert E. Cramer (incumbent)	186,059	88.8
Libertarian	Alan Barksdale	22,110	10.6
Write-in		1,345	0.6
Total votes		209,514	100.0
Democratic hold			

Alabama's 5th congressional district election, 2002
Party	Candidate	Votes	%
Democratic	Robert E. Cramer (incumbent)	143,029	73.3
Republican	Stephen Engel	48,226	24.7
Libertarian	Alan Barksdale	3,772	1.9
Write-in		144	0.1
Total votes		195,171	100.0
Democratic hold			

Alabama's 5th congressional district election, 2004
Party	Candidate	Votes	%
Democratic	Robert E. Cramer (incumbent)	200,999	73.0
Republican	Gerry Wallace	74,145	26.9
Write-in		315	0.1
Total votes		275,459	100.0
Democratic hold			

Alabama's 5th congressional district election, 2006
Party	Candidate	Votes	%
Democratic	Robert E. Cramer (incumbent)	143,015	98.3
Write-in		2,540	1.7
Total votes		145,555	100.0
Democratic hold			

== Group ratings (2004) ==
- National Journal
  - Economic: 50% Liberal, 49% Conservative
  - Social: 48% Liberal, 51% Conservative
  - Foreign: 54% Liberal, 45% Conservative
- Americans for Democratic Action: 75
- American Civil Liberties Union: 25
- Chamber of Commerce of the United States: 86
- Christian Coalition: 58
- American Conservative Union: 50
- National Taxpayers Union: 26
- League of Conservation Voters: 36

== Notes ==
U.S. House of Representatives
Preceded by Ronnie Flippo	Member of the U.S. House of Representatives from Alabama's 5th congressional district 1991–2009	Succeeded by Parker Griffith
Party political offices
Preceded by Gary Condit	Chair of the Blue Dog Coalition for Administration; 1999–2001; Served alongside: Chris John (Communications), Charles Stenholm (Policy)	Succeeded by Chris John
U.S. order of precedence (ceremonial)
Preceded by Marty Russo as Former U.S. Representative	Order of precedence of the United States as Former U.S. Representative	Succeeded by Pete Hoekstra as Former U.S. Representative
