= 2004 United States House of Representatives elections in Alabama =

- November 2, 2004

All 7 Alabama seats to the United States House of Representatives
	Majority party	Minority party
Party	Republican	Democratic
Last election	5	2
Seats won	5	2
Seat change	Steady	Steady
Popular vote	1,079,657	708,425
Percentage	60.22%	39.51%

Republican
50–60%
60–70%
70–80%
80–90%
>90%
Democratic
60–70%
70–80%
80–90%

The 2004 United States House of Representatives elections in Alabama were held on November 2, 2004, to determine the representation of the state of Alabama in the United States House of Representatives. the winning candidates will serve a two-year term from January 3, 2005, to January 3, 2007. The primary elections were held on Tuesday, June 6, 2006.

== Overview ==
2004 United States House of Representatives elections in Alabama
Party	Votes	Percentage	Seats	+/–
Republican	1,079,657	60.22%	5	—
Democratic	708,425	39.51%	2	—
Write-in	4,677	0.26%	0	—
Totals	1,792,759	100.00%	7	—

== District 1 ==
2004 Alabama's 1st congressional district election
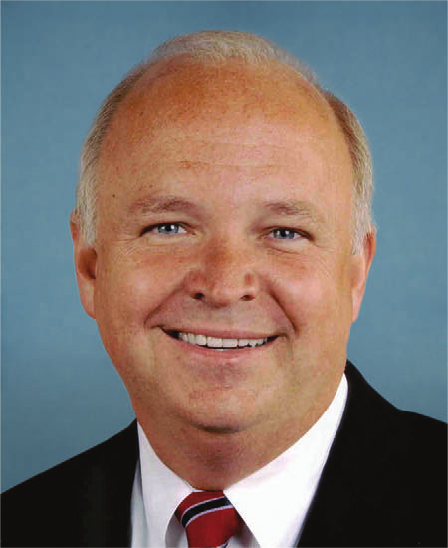

Nominee	Jo Bonner	Judy McCain Belk
Party	Republican	Democratic
Popular vote	161,067	93,938
Percentage	63.1%	36.8%
U.S. Representative before election
Jo Bonner (inc.)
Republican
Elected U.S. Representative
Jo Bonner
Republican

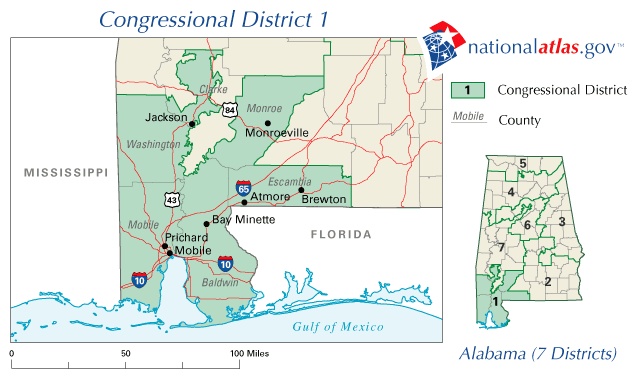

In this solid Republican district based in the Gulf Coast region of Alabama, incumbent Republican Congressman Jo Bonner won re-election against Democratic challenger Judy McCain Belk, receiving 63.12% of the vote with a margin of 26.31%.

=== Predictions ===
Source	Ranking	As of
The Cook Political Report	Safe R	October 29, 2004
Sabato's Crystal Ball	Safe R	November 1, 2004

=== Results ===
Alabama's 1st congressional district election, 2004
Party	Candidate	Votes	%
Republican	Jo Bonner (inc.)	161,067	63.12
Democratic	Judy McCain Belk	93,938	36.81
Write-ins		159	0.06
Total votes		255,164	100.00
Republican hold			

== District 2 ==
2004 Alabama's 2nd congressional district election
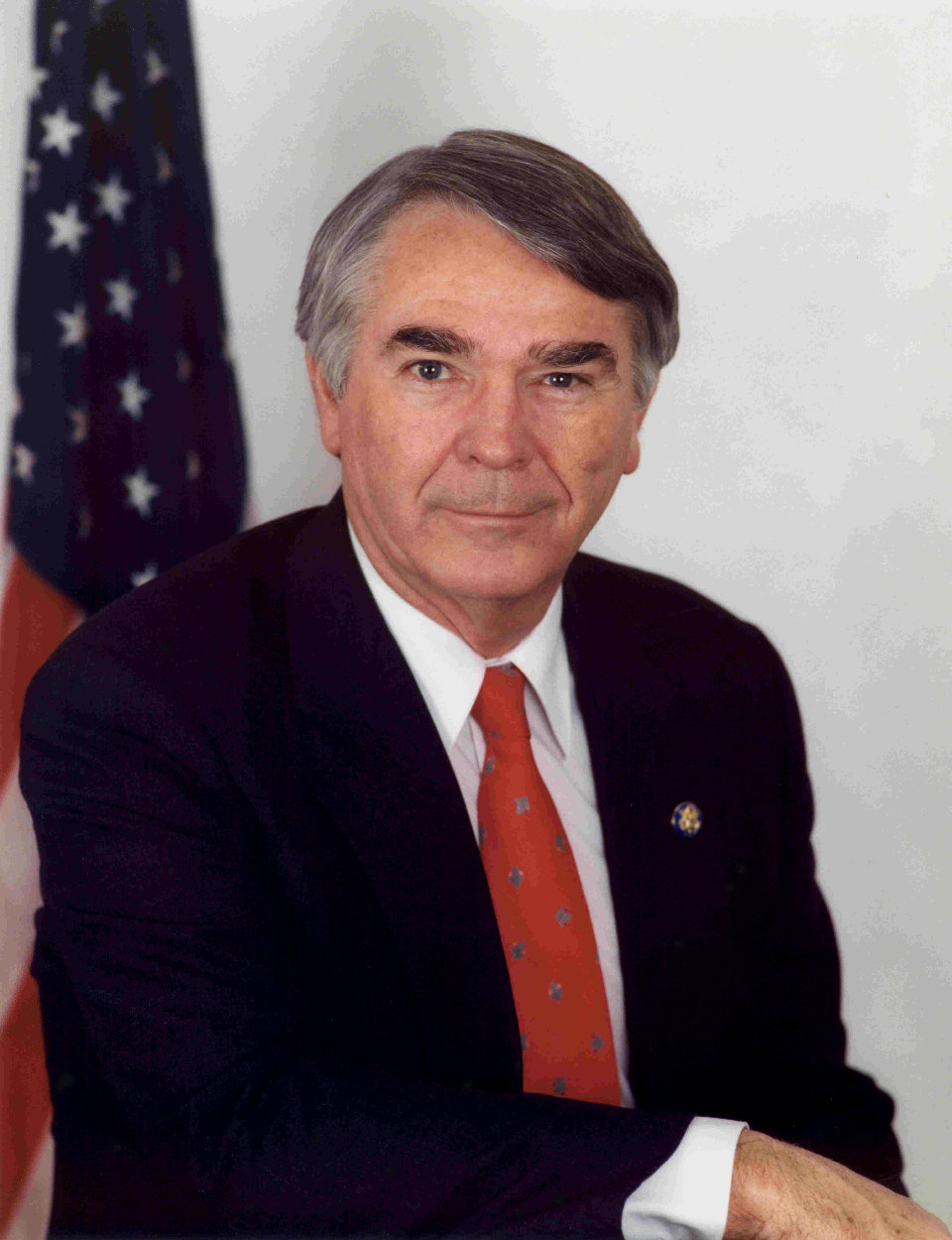

Nominee	Terry Everett	Chuck James
Party	Republican	Democratic
Popular vote	177,086	70,562
Percentage	71.4%	28.5%
U.S. Representative before election
Terry Everett (inc.)
Republican
Elected U.S. Representative
Terry Everett
Republican

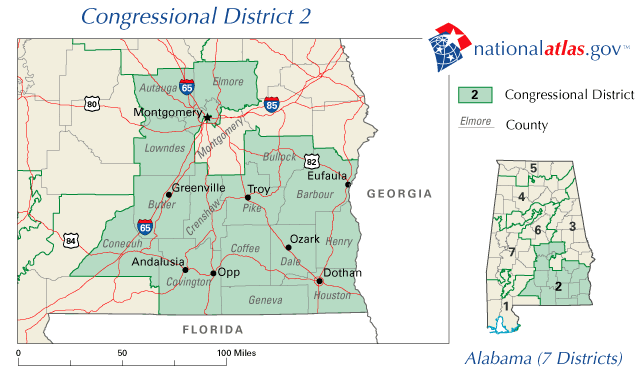

Seeking a seventh term in Congress, incumbent Republican Congressman Terry Everett easily defeated Democratic nominee, Chuck James, in this very conservative district based in the suburbs of Montgomery and southeastern Alabama with 71 percent of the vote.

=== Predictions ===
Source	Ranking	As of
The Cook Political Report	Safe R	October 29, 2004
Sabato's Crystal Ball	Safe R	November 1, 2004

=== Results ===
Alabama's 2nd congressional district election, 2004
Party	Candidate	Votes	%
Republican	Terry Everett (inc.)	177,086	71.42
Democratic	Chuck James	70,562	28.46
Write-ins		299	0.12
Total votes		247,947	100.00
Republican hold			

== District 3 ==
2004 Alabama's 3rd congressional district election
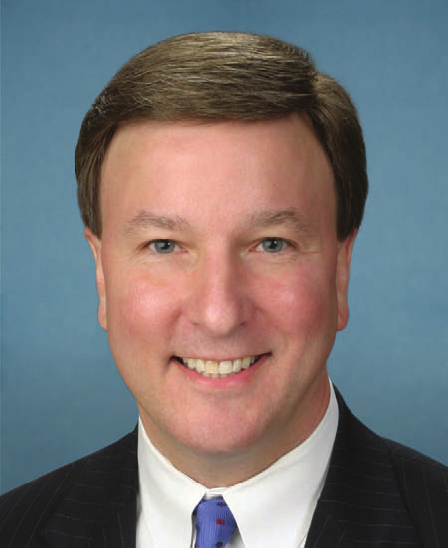

Nominee	Mike D. Rogers	Bill Fuller
Party	Republican	Democratic
Popular vote	150,411	95,240
Percentage	61.2%	38.8%
U.S. Representative before election
Mike D. Rogers (inc.)
Republican
Elected U.S. Representative
Mike D. Rogers
Republican

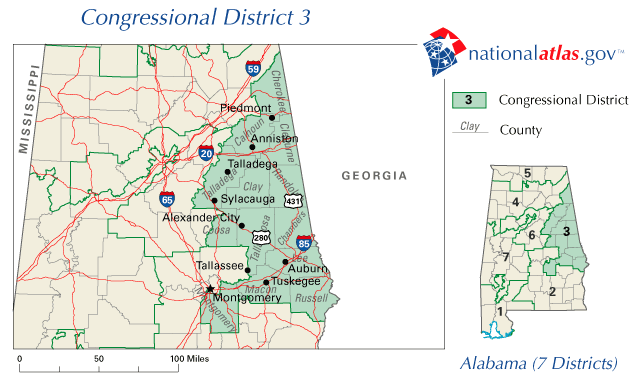

This district, stretching from north to south on the eastern edge of Alabama, incumbent Mike Rogers wins re-election to a second term.

=== Predictions ===
Source	Ranking	As of
The Cook Political Report	Safe R	October 29, 2004
Sabato's Crystal Ball	Safe R	November 1, 2004

=== Results ===
Alabama's 3rd congressional district election, 2004
Party	Candidate	Votes	%
Republican	Mike D. Rogers (inc.)	150,411	61.20
Democratic	Bill Fuller	95,240	38.75
Write-ins		133	0.05
Total votes		245,784	100.00
Republican hold			

== District 4 ==
2004 Alabama's 4th congressional district election
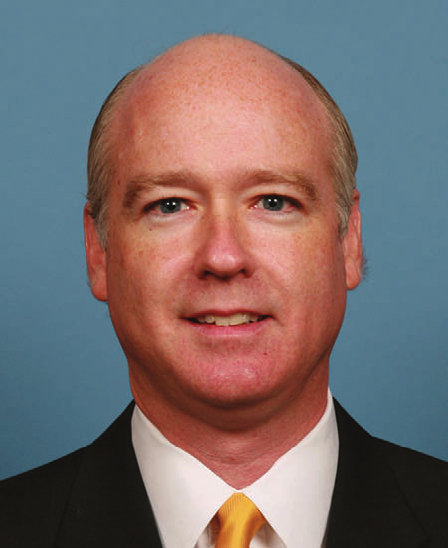

Nominee	Robert Aderholt	Carl Cole
Party	Republican	Democratic
Popular vote	191,110	64,278
Percentage	74.7%	25.1%
U.S. Representative before election
Robert Aderholt (inc.)
Republican
Elected U.S. Representative
Robert Aderholt
Republican

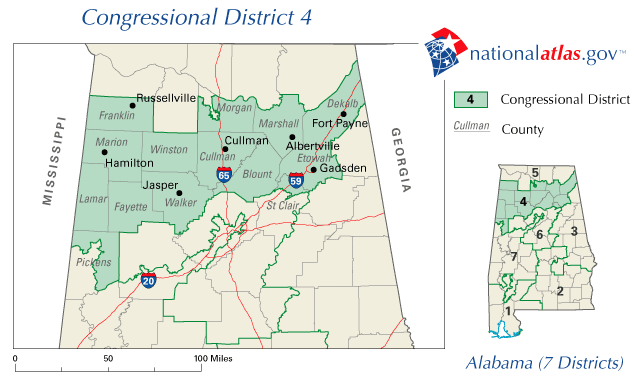

In this north Alabama district incumbent representative Robert Aderholt wins re-election to a 5th term with almost 75 percent of the vote.

=== Predictions ===
Source	Ranking	As of
The Cook Political Report	Safe R	October 29, 2004
Sabato's Crystal Ball	Safe R	November 1, 2004

=== Results ===
Alabama's 4th congressional district election, 2004
Party	Candidate	Votes	%
Republican	Robert Aderholt (inc.)	191,110	74.73
Democratic	Carl Cole	64,278	25.14
Write-ins		336	0.13
Total votes		275,459	100.00
Republican hold			

== District 5 ==
2004 Alabama's 5th congressional district election
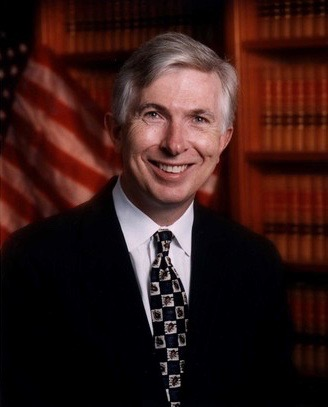

Nominee	Bud Cramer	Gerry Wallace
Party	Democratic	Republican
Popular vote	200,999	74,145
Percentage	73.0%	26.9%
U.S. Representative before election
Bud Cramer (inc.)
Democratic
Elected U.S. Representative
Bud Cramer
Democratic

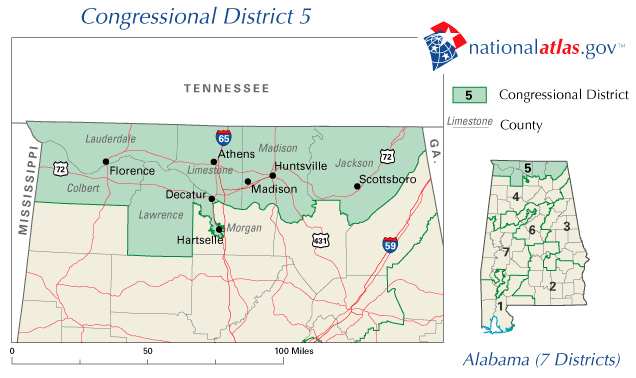

This district, found on the northernmost edge of Alabama, had not elected a Republican to Congress since Reconstruction, despite its strong proclivity towards Republican candidates at the national level and the socially conservative views of its residents. Long-time incumbent Democratic Congressman Bud Cramer won with over 70 percent of the vote.

=== Predictions ===
Source	Ranking	As of
The Cook Political Report	Safe D	October 29, 2004
Sabato's Crystal Ball	Safe D	November 1, 2004

=== Results ===
Alabama's 5th congressional district election, 2004
Party	Candidate	Votes	%
Democratic	Bud Cramer (inc.)	200,999	72.96
Republican	Gerry Wallace	74,145	26.91
Write-ins		315	0.03
Total votes		275,459	100.00
Democratic hold			

== District 6 ==
2004 Alabama's 6th congressional district election
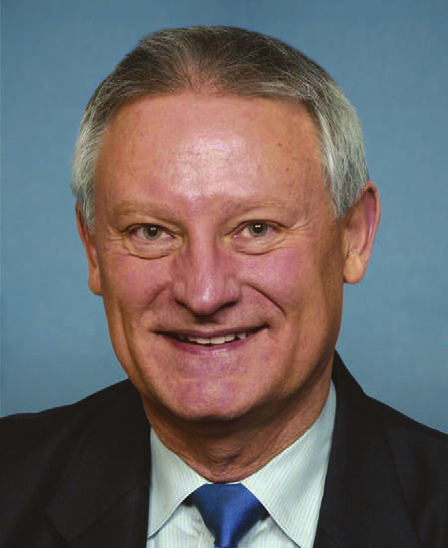
Nominee	Spencer Bachus
Party	Republican
Popular vote	264,819
Percentage	98.8%
U.S. Representative before election
Spencer Bachus (inc.)
Republican
Elected U.S. Representative
Gary Palmer
Republican

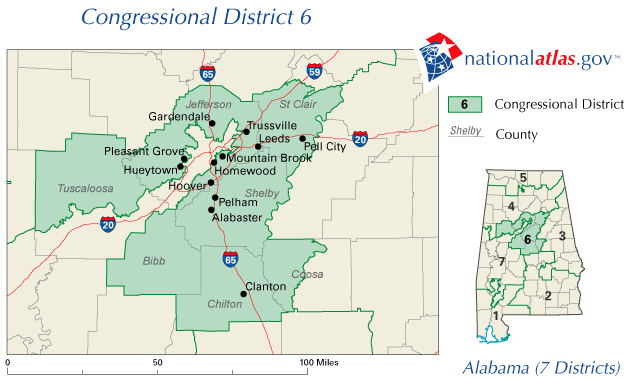

This district, considered by the Cook Partisan Voting Index to be the most conservative congressional district in the country, owes its strong allegiance to Republicans to tapping the highly conservative residents of the Birmingham suburbs. To that effect, incumbent Republican Congressman Spencer Bachus won a seventh term in Congress with no opponents.

=== Predictions ===
Source	Ranking	As of
The Cook Political Report	Safe R	October 29, 2004
Sabato's Crystal Ball	Safe R	November 1, 2004

=== Results ===
Alabama's 6th congressional district election, 2004
Party	Candidate	Votes	%
Republican	Spencer Bachus (inc.)	264,819	98.79
Write-ins		3,224	1.21
Total votes		268,043	100.00
Republican hold			

== District 7 ==
2004 Alabama's 7th congressional district election
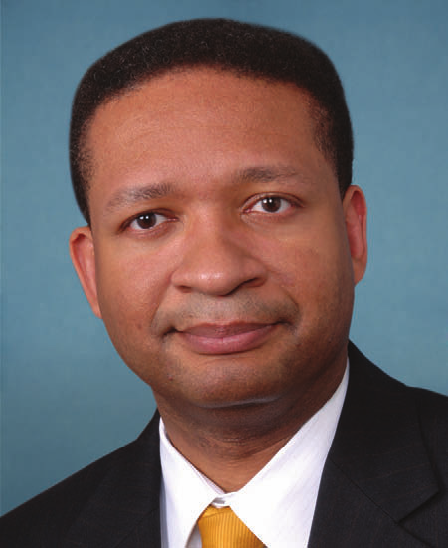

Nominee	Artur Davis	Steve Cameron
Party	Democratic	Republican
Popular vote	183,408	61,019
Percentage	75.0%	24.9%
U.S. Representative before election
Artur Davis (inc.)
Democratic
Elected U.S. Representative
Artur Davis
Democratic

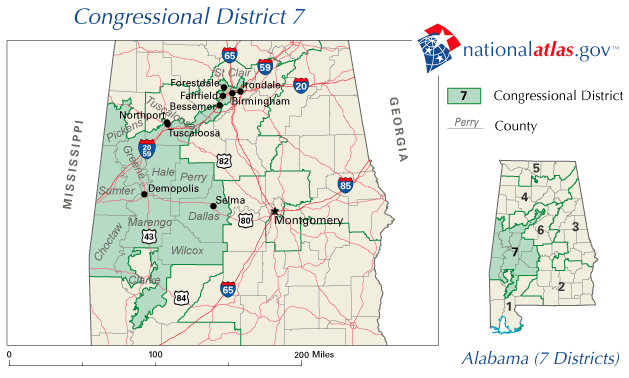

Incumbent Democratic Congressman Artur Davis sought a third term in this district that is mainly rooted in western Alabama but reaches into some portions of Birmingham, as well as being the only majority-black district in Alabama. Davis won his second term with 75 percent of the vote.

=== Predictions ===
Source	Ranking	As of
The Cook Political Report	Safe D	October 29, 2004
Sabato's Crystal Ball	Safe D	November 1, 2004

=== Results ===
Alabama's 7th congressional district election, 2006
Party	Candidate	Votes	%
Democratic	Artur Davis (inc.)	183,408	74.97
Republican	Steve Cameron	61,019	24.94
Write-ins		211	0.09
Total votes		244,638	100.00
Democratic hold			
