= 1984 United States House of Representatives elections in Alabama =

1984 United States House of Representatives election in Alabama
- November 6, 1984
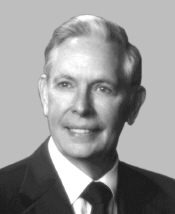

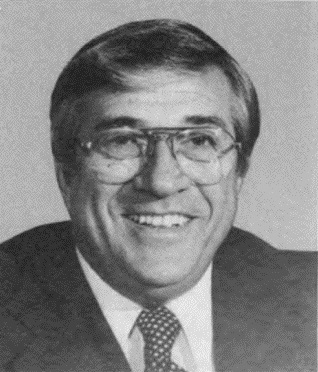
	First party	Second party
Leader	Tom Bevill	William Louis Dickinson
Party	Democratic	Republican
Leader since	1977	1981
Leader's seat	4th district	2nd district
Seats won	5	2
Popular vote	821,773	308,182
Percentage	71.9%	27.0%
District results
Democratic
50–60%
90–100%
Republican
50–60%
60–70%

The 1984 United States House of Representatives elections in Alabama were held on November 6, 1984, to determine who would represent Alabama in the United States House of Representatives. Alabama had seven seats in the House, apportioned according to the 1980 United States census. Representatives are elected for two-year terms.

== Overview ==
1984 United States House of Representatives elections in Alabama
Party	Votes	Percentage	Seats	+/–
Democratic	821,773	71.9%	5	-
Republican	308,182	27.0%	2	-
Libertarian	12,191	1.07%	0	-
Socialist Workers Party	144	0.01%	0	-
Totals	1,142,290	100.0%	7	-

== District 1 ==
Alabama's 1st congressional district election, 1984
Party	Candidate	Votes	%
Republican	Sonny Callahan	102,479	51.00%
Democratic	Frank McWright	98,455	49.00%
Total votes		200,934	100.00%
Republican hold			

== District 2 ==
Alabama's 2nd congressional district election, 1984
Party	Candidate	Votes	%
Republican	William Louis Dickinson	118,153	60.34%
Democratic	Larry Lee	75,506	38.56%
Libertarian	Frank Tipler III	2,156	1.10%
Total votes		195,815	100.00%
Republican hold			

== District 3 ==
Alabama's 3rd congressional district election, 1984
Party	Candidate	Votes	%
Democratic	Bill Nichols	120,357	96.21%
Libertarian	Mark Thornton	4,745	3.79%
Total votes		125,102	100.00%
Democratic hold			

== District 4 ==
Alabama's 4th congressional district election, 1984
Party	Candidate	Votes	%
Democratic	Tom Bevill	120,106	100.00%
Total votes		120,106	100.00%
Democratic hold			

== District 5 ==
Alabama's 5th congressional district election, 1984
Party	Candidate	Votes	%
Democratic	Ronnie Flippo	140,542	95.88%
Libertarian	D. M. Samsil	6,033	4.12%
Total votes		146,575	100.00%
Democratic hold			

== District 6 ==
Alabama's 6th congressional district election, 1984
Party	Candidate	Votes	%
Democratic	Ben Erdreich	130,973	59.61%
Republican	J. T. Waggoner	87,550	39.85%
Libertarian	Steve Smith	1,043	0.47%
Socialist Workers	Mark Curtis	144	0.07%
Total votes		219,710	100.00%
Democratic hold			

== District 7 ==
Alabama's 7th congressional district election, 1984
Party	Candidate	Votes	%
Democratic	Richard Shelby	135,834	96.80%
Libertarian	Charles Ewing	4,498	3.21%
Total votes		146,575	100.0%
Democratic hold			

== See also ==
- 1984 United States House of Representatives elections
