= 2008 United States House of Representatives elections in Alabama =

- November 4, 2008

All 7 Alabama seats to the United States House of Representatives
	Majority party	Minority party
Party	Republican	Democratic
Last election	5	2
Seats won	4	3
Seat change	▼1	▲1
Popular vote	1,120,903	718,367
Percentage	60.42%	38.72%
Swing	▲5.38%	▼5.31%

Republican
50–60%
60–70%
70–80%
80–90%
90–100%
Democratic
50–60%
60–70%
70–80%
80–90%
90–100%

The 2008 United States House of Representatives elections in Alabama were held on November 4, 2008, to determine the representation of the state of Alabama in the United States House of Representatives, coinciding with the presidential and senatorial elections. Representatives are elected for two-year terms; those elected served in the 111th Congress from January 3, 2009, until January 3, 2011.

Alabama has seven seats in the House, apportioned according to the 2000 United States census. Its 2007–2008 congressional delegation consisted of five Republicans and two Democrats. Afterwards, it contained four Republicans and three Democrats, as District 2 changed from open Republican to Democratic.

== Overview ==
Popular vote
Republican	60.42%
Democratic	38.72%
Other	1.31%

House seats
Republican	57.14%
Democratic	42.86%

=== By district ===
Results of the 2008 United States House of Representatives elections in Alabama by district:

District	Republican		Democratic		Others (write-in)		Total		Result
District	Votes	%	Votes	%	Votes	%	Votes	%	Result
District 1	210,660	98.27%	0	0	3,707	1.73%	214,367	100.0%	Republican hold
District 2	142,578	49.61%	144,368	50.23%	448	0.16%	287,394	100.0%	Democratic gain
District 3	150,819	53.39%	131,299	46.48%	367	0.13%	282,485	100.0%	Republican hold
District 4	196,741	74.76%	66,077	25.11%	349	0.13%	263,167	100.0%	Republican hold
District 5	147,314	47.94%	158,324	51.52%	1,644	0.54%	307,282	100.0%	Democratic hold
District 6	280,902	97.80%	0	0.00%	6,335	2.21%	287,237	100.0%	Republican hold
District 7	0	0.00%	228,518	98.63%	3,183	1.37%	231,701	100.0%	Democratic hold
Total	1,120,903	60.42%	718,367	38.72%	16,033	0.86%	1,855,303	100.0%	

== District 1 ==
2008 Alabama's 1st congressional district election
- November 4, 2008
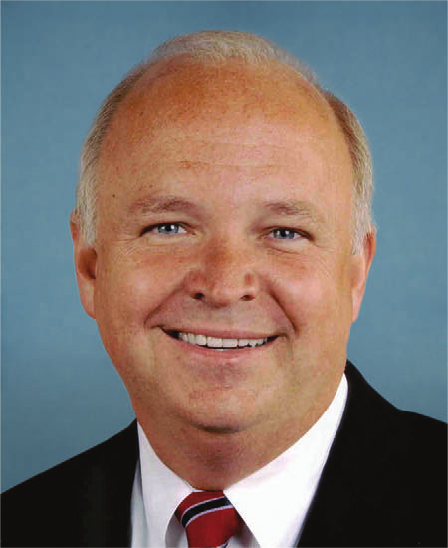
Nominee	Jo Bonner
Party	Republican
Popular vote	210,660
Percentage	98.27%
- County results Bonner: 90–100%
U.S. Representative before election
Jo Bonner
Republican
Elected U.S. Representative
Jo Bonner
Republican

The 1st district was based in the Gold Coast of Alabama, including Mobile, Saraland, Bay Minette, Foley, Chatom, and Monroe. The district included all of Mobile, Baldwin, Escambia, Washington, Monroe, and parts of Clarke County. Due to redistricting, the district lost territory in portions of Clarke County to the 7th district, but gained portions of Monroe County, now having the entire county in the 1st district. The 1st district has a PVI of R+16 but voted for John McCain by 22 points in the concurring presidential election. The incumbent was Republican Jo Bonner, who was reelected with 68.10% of the vote in 2006.

The Democratic and Republican primaries were not contested, with incumbent representative Jo Bonner winning the Republican party and Thomas Fuller winning the Democratic primary. However, Fuller withdrew from the race on June 12, 2008, stating he was unable to wage a creditable campaign in the district.

=== Republican nominee ===
- Jo Bonner, incumbent U.S. representative since 2003

=== Democratic nominee ===
- Thomas Fuller, Chair of the Washington County Executive Committee (withdrawn)

=== General election ===
==== Predictions ====
Source	Ranking	As of
The Cook Political Report	Safe R	November 6, 2008
Rothenberg	Safe R	November 2, 2008
Sabato's Crystal Ball	Safe R	November 6, 2008
Real Clear Politics	Safe R	November 7, 2008
CQ Politics	Safe R	November 6, 2008

==== Results ====
Alabama's 1st congressional district, 2008
Party	Candidate	Votes	%
Republican	Jo Bonner (incumbent)	210,660	98.27%
Write-in		3,707	1.73%
Total votes		214,367	100%

== District 2 ==
2008 Alabama's 2nd congressional district election
- November 4, 2008
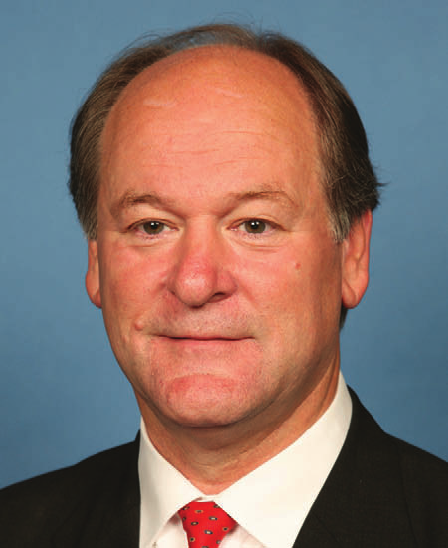

Nominee	Bobby Bright	Jay Love
Party	Democratic	Republican
Popular vote	144,368	142,578
Percentage	50.23%	49.61%
- Results; Bright: 50–60% 60–70% 70–80% 80–90% >90% Love: 50–60% 60–70% 70–80% 80–90% Tie: 50% No Data
U.S. Representative before election
Terry Everett
Republican
Elected U.S. Representative
Bobby Bright
Democratic

This district covered southeastern Alabama, including Dothan and Montgomery. Republican Terry Everett, who had represented the district since 1993, decided to retire. Montgomery Mayor Bobby Bright won the Democratic primary. State Representative Jay Love won the Republican run-off election on July 15 against State Senator Harri Anne Smith (campaign website). George W. Bush won 67% in 2004 here. Bright won 50% of the vote to Love's 49%.

- Bobby Bright (D) (campaign website)
- Jay Love (R) (campaign website)
- 2nd district race ranking and background from CQ Politics
- Alabama District 2 race from OurCampaigns.org
- Campaign contributions from OpenSecrets
- Love (R) vs Bright (D) graph of collected poll results from Pollster.com

=== Predictions ===
Source	Ranking	As of
The Cook Political Report	Tossup	November 6, 2008
Rothenberg	Tossup	November 2, 2008
Sabato's Crystal Ball	Lean R	November 6, 2008
Real Clear Politics	Tossup	November 7, 2008
CQ Politics	Tossup	November 6, 2008

Alabama's 2nd congressional district election, 2008
Party	Candidate	Votes	%
Democratic	Bobby Bright	144,368	50.23%
Republican	Jay Love	142,578	49.61%
Write-in		448	0.16%
Total votes		287,394	100.00%
Democratic gain from Republican			

== District 3 ==
2008 Alabama's 3rd congressional district election
- November 4, 2008
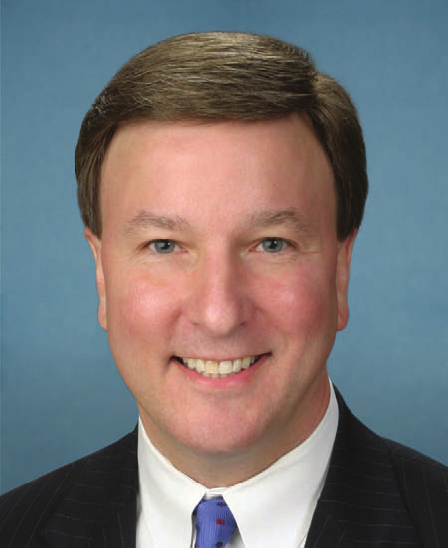

Nominee	Mike Rogers	Joshua Segall
Party	Republican	Democratic
Popular vote	150,819	131,299
Percentage	53.39%	46.48%
- Rogers: 50–60% 60–70% 70–80% 80–90% >90% Segall: 50–60% 60–70% 70–80% 80–90% >90% Tie: 50% No Data
U.S. Representative before election
Mike Rogers
Republican
Elected U.S. Representative
Mike Rogers
Republican

Incumbent Republican Representative Mike Rogers won re-election with 54% of the vote. He defeated Democrat Joshua Segall by 8.19%.

=== Predictions ===
Source	Ranking	As of
The Cook Political Report	Likely R	November 6, 2008
Rothenberg	Safe R	November 2, 2008
Sabato's Crystal Ball	Safe R	November 6, 2008
Real Clear Politics	Safe R	November 7, 2008
CQ Politics	Likely R	November 6, 2008

Alabama's 3rd congressional district election, 2008
Party	Candidate	Votes	%
Republican	Mike Rogers (incumbent)	142,708	54.03%
Democratic	Joshua Segall	121,080	45.84%
Write-in		332	0.13%
Total votes		264,120	100.00%
Republican hold			

== District 4 ==
2008 Alabama's 4th congressional district election
- November 4, 2008
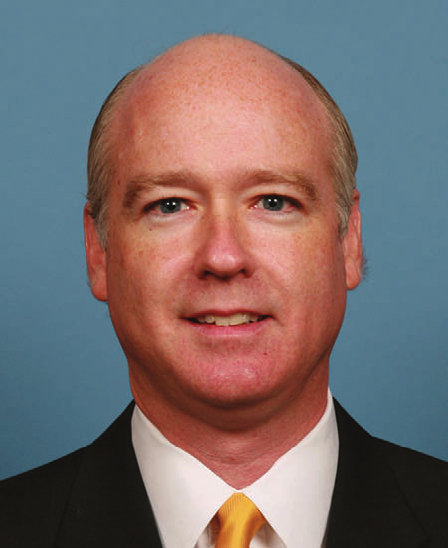

Nominee	Robert Aderholt	Nicholas Sparks
Party	Republican	Democratic
Popular vote	196,741	66,077
Percentage	74.76%	25.11%
- Aderholt: 50–60% 60–70% 70–80% 80–90% >90% Sparks: 50–60% 60–70% 70–80% 80–90% >90% Tie: 50% No Data
U.S. Representative before election
Robert Aderholt
Republican
Elected U.S. Representative
Robert Aderholt
Republican

Incumbent Republican Representative Robert Aderholt won re-election with 74.76% of the vote. He defeated Democrat Nick Sparks by 49.65%.

=== Predictions ===
Source	Ranking	As of
The Cook Political Report	Safe R	November 6, 2008
Rothenberg	Safe R	November 2, 2008
Sabato's Crystal Ball	Safe R	November 6, 2008
Real Clear Politics	Safe R	November 7, 2008
CQ Politics	Safe R	November 6, 2008

Alabama's 4th congressional district election, 2008
Party	Candidate	Votes	%
Republican	Robert Aderholt (incumbent)	196,741	74.76%
Democratic	Nick Sparks	66,077	25.11%
Write-in		349	0.13%
Total votes		263,167	100.00%
Republican hold			

== District 5 ==
2008 Alabama's 5th congressional district election
- November 4, 2008
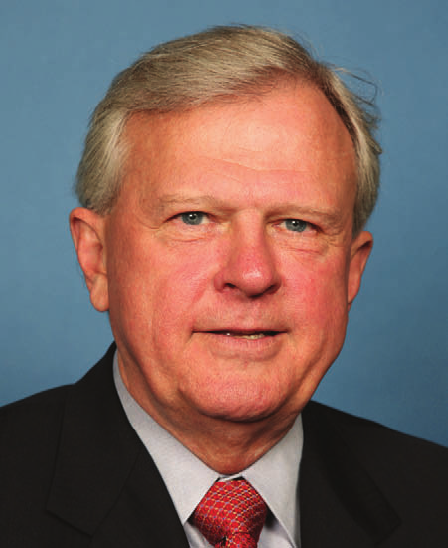

Nominee	Parker Griffith	Wayne Parker
Party	Democratic	Republican
Popular vote	158,324	147,314
Percentage	51.52%	47.94%
- Griffith: 50–60% 60–70% 70–80% 80–90% >90% Parker: 50–60% 60–70% 70–80% 80–90% Tie: 50% No Data
U.S. Representative before election
Bud Cramer
Democratic
Elected U.S. Representative
Parker Griffith
Democratic

This district includes the counties of Colbert, Lauderdale, Lawrence, Limestone, Madison, Jackson, and parts of Morgan. Democratic incumbent Bud Cramer has represented the district since 1990. He did not seek reelection and endorsed State Senator Parker Griffith.

Eight candidates were running for the seat in the June 3, 2008, primary election. On the Democratic side, State Senator Dr. Parker Griffith defeated physicist David Maker (website), carrying 90% of the vote. Wayne Parker won the Republican runoff on July 15 against attorney Cheryl Baswell Guthrie (campaign website). In the primary, Wayne Parker failed to gain the necessary 51% vote to avoid the runoff. Guthrie had carried 18% of the vote.

A year after his election, Griffith switched parties and ran for a second term in the 2010 Republican primary.

- Parker Griffith (D) - State Senator, businessman, and Huntsville's first radiation oncologist (campaign website)
- Wayne Parker (R) - Insurance executive, lost to Cramer in 1994 and 1996 (campaign website)
- 5th District race ranking and background from CQ Politics
- Alabama District 5 race from OurCampaigns.org
- Campaign contributions from OpenSecrets
- LoParker (R) vs Griffith (D) graph of collected poll results from Pollster.com

=== Predictions ===
Source	Ranking	As of
The Cook Political Report	Tossup	November 6, 2008
Rothenberg	Tossup	November 2, 2008
Sabato's Crystal Ball	Lean D	November 6, 2008
Real Clear Politics	Lean D	November 7, 2008
CQ Politics	Tossup	November 6, 2008

Alabama's 5th congressional district election, 2008
Party	Candidate	Votes	%
Democratic	Parker Griffith	158,324	51.52%
Republican	Wayne Parker	147,314	47.94%
Write-in		1,644	0.54%
Total votes		307,282	100.00%
Democratic hold			

== District 6 ==
2008 Alabama's 6th congressional district election
- November 4, 2008
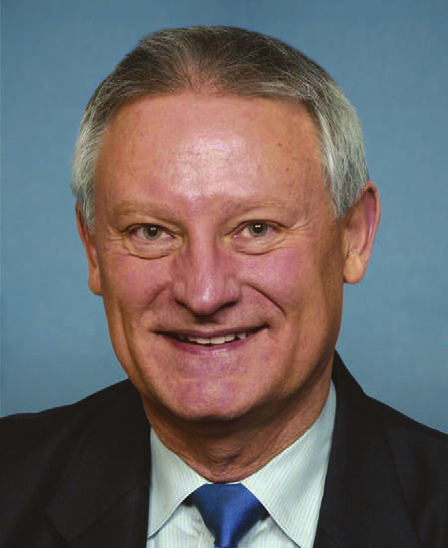
Nominee	Spencer Bachus
Party	Republican
Popular vote	280,902
Percentage	97.80%
- County results Bachus: 90–100%
U.S. Representative before election
Spencer Bachus
Republican
Elected U.S. Representative
Spencer Bachus
Republican

The 6th district was based in the city of Birmingham's suburbs and exurbs, including Alabaster, Trussville, Vestavia Hills, Pell City, Hueytown, and portions of Birmingham. The district includes all of Chilton, Bibb, Shelby, and parts of Tuscaloosa, Jefferson, St. Clair, and Coosa Counties. Due to redistricting, the district gained more territory around Tuscaloosa and Birmingham, as well as portions of St. Clair County, along with gaining the rest of Bibb, all of Chilton, and portions of Coosa Counties. The 6th district has a PVI of R+18 but voted for John McCain by 53 points in the concurrent presidential election. The incumbent is Republican Spencer Bachus, who was reelected with 98.32% of the vote in 2006.

The Republican primary was not contested, with incumbent representative Spencer Bachus winning the nomination unopposed.

=== Republican nominee ===
- Spencer Bachus, incumbent U.S. Representative since 1993

=== General election ===
==== Predictions ====
Source	Ranking	As of
The Cook Political Report	Safe R	November 6, 2008
Rothenberg	Safe R	November 2, 2008
Sabato's Crystal Ball	Safe R	November 6, 2008
Real Clear Politics	Safe R	November 7, 2008
CQ Politics	Safe R	November 6, 2008

==== Results ====
Alabama's 6th congressional district, 2008
Party	Candidate	Votes	%
Republican	Spencer Bachus (incumbent)	280,902	97.80%
Write-in		6,335	2.21%
Total votes		287,237	100%

== District 7 ==
2008 Alabama's 7th congressional district election
- November 4, 2008
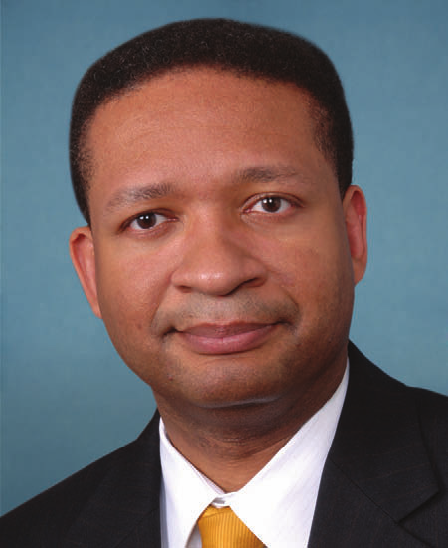
Nominee	Artur Davis
Party	Democratic
Popular vote	228,518
Percentage	98.63%
- County results Davis: 90–100%
U.S. Representative before election
Artur Davis
Democratic
Elected U.S. Representative
Artur Davis
Democratic

The 7th district is based in Alabama's 'Black Belt' region, including Selma, Tuscaloosa, Eutaw, Livingston, Bessemer, and portions of Birmingham. The district includes all of Dallas, Wilcox, Marengo, Choctaw, Sumter, Greene, Hale, and parts of Jefferson, Pickens, Clarke, and Tuscaloosa Counties. Due to redistricting, the district lost all its territory in Lowndes County and its portions of Montgomery County, but gained more territory around Tuscaloosa and Birmingham. The 7th district has a PVI of D+14 but voted for Barack Obama by 45 points in the concurring presidential election. The incumbent is Democrat Artur Davis, who was reelected with 99.04% of the vote in 2006.

The Democratic primary was not contested, with incumbent representative Artur Davis winning the nomination unopposed.

=== Democratic nominee ===
- Artur Davis, incumbent U.S. Representative since 2003

=== General election ===
==== Predictions ====
Source	Ranking	As of
The Cook Political Report	Safe D	November 6, 2008
Rothenberg	Safe D	November 2, 2008
Sabato's Crystal Ball	Safe D	November 6, 2008
Real Clear Politics	Safe D	November 7, 2008
CQ Politics	Safe D	November 6, 2008

==== Results ====
Alabama's 7th congressional district, 2008
Party	Candidate	Votes	%
Democratic	Artur Davis (incumbent)	228,518	98.63%
Write-in		3,183	1.37%
Total votes		231,701	100%

Preceded by 2006 elections	United States House elections in Alabama; 2008	Succeeded by 2010 elections
