= Baldwin Times =

- Type: Twice weekly newspaper
- Format: Broadsheet
- Owner(s): Gulf Coast Newspapers, Osteen Publishing Company
- Publisher: Parks Rogers
- Editor: Cliff McCollum
- Founded: 1890
- Headquarters: 901 N. McKenzie St., Foley, Alabama, United States
- Circulation: 1,000
- OCLC number: 11836647
- Website: gulfcoastnewstoday.com/baldwin-times

The Baldwin Times is a twice-weekly newspaper serving the Bay Minette area in the U.S. state of Alabama. It has a circulation of about 1,000 as of 2018.

== History ==
Founded in 1890 as the Daphne Times the paper was relaunched five years later as the Baldwin Times after local lawyer Abner Smith bought the publication for seventy-five dollars at a foreclosure auction in 1894. Initial subscriptions numbered only around 250. The paper moved from Daphne to Bay Minette in 1901 where, suffering from illness, Smith sold it in 1905 to Ira Jones, but later bought back the paper, running it from 1911 to his death in 1922. It was sold to R.B. Vail, a former manager at the Western Newspaper Union in July 1922. The following year Vail would go on to buy the Atmore Record. In 1927, he was elected president of the Alabama Press Association.

The Times was acquired in 1936 by James H. Faulkner, a recent college graduate who later ran for Governor, and served both in the Alabama Senate and as mayor of Baldwin. Faulkner expanded his holdings in 1947 when he bought the Monroe Journal from A.C. Lee (Harper Lee's father) for fifteen thousand dollars. Jimmy Faulkner was later given a "Lifetime Achievement Award" by the Alabama Press Association and both Faulkner University and Faulkner Community College System are named in his honor. The Faulkner family owned the Baldwin Times until 1974, when they sold it to Frank Helderman and his son.

Helderman Jr. sold the Baldwin Times, which was then part of the Baldwin Publishing Company, to Terry Everett in 1981. In 1983, Everett established Gulf Coast Media, which included the Baldwin Times, along with five other papers he purchased. Everett went on to sell all of his papers in 1988 and was elected to the U.S. House of Representatives in 1992, where he served until 2009.

Gulf Coast Newspapers was sold by Worrell Enterprises Inc. to Heritage Newspapers Inc. in 1996. It was owned by Crescent Publishing Company from 2000 to 2014. In 2014, Gulf Coast Newspapers was purchased by Osteen Publishing Company News. As of 2018, Osteen Publishing Company still owns and publishes the Baldwin Times.
