= Nicholas Sparks (disambiguation) =

Nicholas Sparks (born 1965) is an American author.

Nicholas Sparks may also refer to:

- Nicholas Sparks (politician) (1794–1862), land owner and member of the first city council of Ottawa, Canada
- Nick Sparks (Alabama politician), Democratic candidate for 2008 elections for the United States House of Representatives representing Alabama's 4th District
