= 2010 United States House of Representatives elections in Alabama =

- November 2, 2010

All 7 Alabama seats to the United States House of Representatives
	Majority party	Minority party
Party	Republican	Democratic
Last election	4	3
Seats before	5 (Note: Representative Parker Griffith of the 5th District switched from the Democratic to Republican party on December 22, 2009.)	2
Seats won	6	1
Seat change	▲1	▼1
Popular vote	914,445	418,957
Percentage	66.86%	30.63%
Swing	▲6.44pp	▼8.09pp

Republican
50–60%
60–70%
70–80%
80–90%
>90%
Democratic
50–60%
60–70%
70–80%
80–90%

The 2010 congressional elections in Alabama were held on November 2, 2010, to determine who would represent the state of Alabama in the United States House of Representatives. Alabama has seven seats in the House, apportioned according to the 2000 United States census. Representatives are elected for two-year terms; those elected would serve in the 112th Congress from January 3, 2011, until January 3, 2013. The primary elections were held on June 1, with the runoff on July 13.

Districts 1, 3, 4, 6, and 7 were considered safe seats for the incumbent party (the Democratic Party for District 7 and the Republican Party for the other districts), according to the Cook Political Report and CQ Politics, and, as predicted, the incumbent party held those seats. Meanwhile, Districts 2 (a Democrat-held seat) and 5 (a Republican-held seat, though the incumbent was a Democrat who switched parties in 2009) were considered up for grabs. The Republican Party gained District 2 and held District 5.

== Overview ==
Results of the 2010 United States House of Representatives elections in Alabama by district:

District	Republican		Democratic		Others		Total		Result
District	Votes	%	Votes	%	Votes	%	Votes	%	Result
District 1	129,063	82.58%	0	0.00%	27,218	17.42%	156,281	100.0%	Republican hold
District 2	111,645	50.97%	106,865	48.79%	518	0.24%	219,028	100.0%	Republican gain
District 3	117,736	59.42%	80,204	40.48%	199	0.10%	198,139	100.0%	Republican hold
District 4	167,714	98.82%	0	0.00%	2,007	1.18%	169,721	100.0%	Republican hold
District 5	131,109	57.89%	95,192	42.03%	189	0.08%	226,490	100.0%	Republican hold
District 6	205,288	98.05%	0	0.00%	4,076	1.95%	209,364	100.0%	Republican hold
District 7	51,890	27.50%	136,696	72.43%	138	0.07%	188,724	100.0%	Democratic hold
Total	914,445	66.86%	418,957	30.63%	34,345	2.51%	1,367,747	100.0%	

== District 1 ==
2010 Alabama's 1st congressional district election
- November 2, 2010
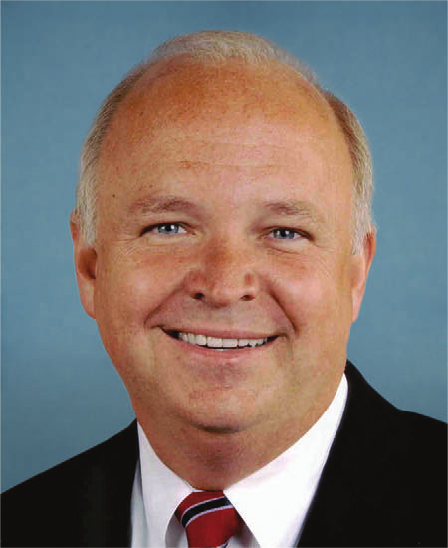

Nominee	Jo Bonner	David M. Walter
Party	Republican	Constitution
Popular vote	129,063	26,357
Percentage	82.58%	16.87%
- County results Bonner: 80–90%
U.S. Representative before election
Jo Bonner
Republican
Elected U.S. Representative
Jo Bonner
Republican

Incumbent Republican Congressman Jo Bonner ran for re-election to a fifth term after deciding not to run for Governor. He was challenged in the Republican primary by Peter Gounares, an Orange Beach real estate developer, and Sean Moser, though Moser ultimately decided to challenge U.S. Senator Richard Shelby for re-election.

Bonner won the Republican primary over Gounares in a landslide, receiving 75 percent of the vote to his 25 percent. In the general election, Bonner only faced businessman David Walter, the Constitution Party nominee. He defeated Walter by a wide margin, winning re-election with 83 percent of the vote.

=== Republican primary ===
==== Candidates ====
- Jo Bonner, incumbent Congressman
- Peter Gounares, real estate developer

==== Results ====
Republican primary results
Party	Candidate	Votes	%
Republican	Jo Bonner (inc.)	56,937	75.25%
Republican	Peter Gounares	18,725	24.75%
Total votes		75,662	100.00%

=== General election ===
==== Candidates ====
- Jo Bonner, incumbent Congressman (Republican)
- David Walter, businessman (Constitution)

==== Predictions ====
Source	Ranking	As of
The Cook Political Report	Safe R	November 1, 2010
Rothenberg	Safe R	November 1, 2010
Sabato's Crystal Ball	Safe R	November 1, 2010
RCP	Safe R	November 1, 2010
CQ Politics	Safe R	October 28, 2010
New York Times	Safe R	November 1, 2010
FiveThirtyEight	Safe R	November 1, 2010

==== Results ====
2010 Alabama's 1st congressional district general election results
Party	Candidate	Votes	%
Republican	Jo Bonner (inc.)	129,063	82.58%
Constitution	David Walter	26,357	16.87%
Write-ins		861	0.55%
Total votes		156,281	100.00%
Republican hold			

== District 2 ==
2010 Alabama's 2nd congressional district election
- November 2, 2010
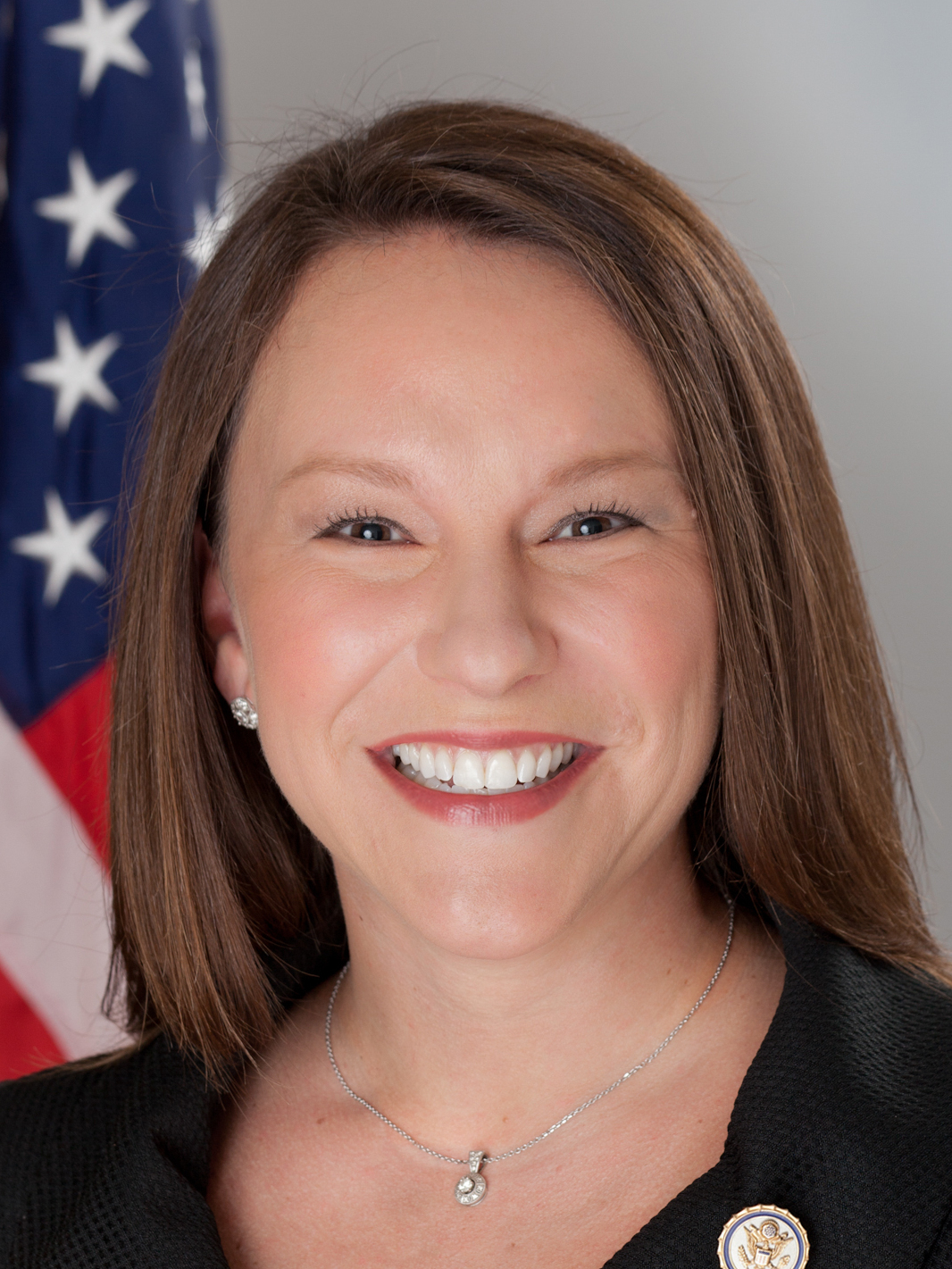

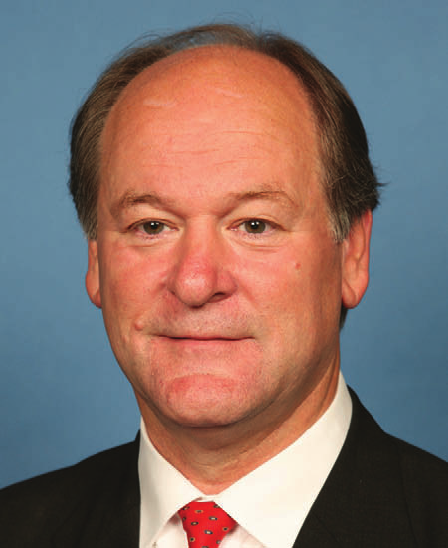
Nominee	Martha Roby	Bobby Bright
Party	Republican	Democratic
Popular vote	111,645	106,865
Percentage	50.97%	48.79%
- County results Roby: 50–60% 60–70% Bright: 50–60% 60–70% 70–80%
U.S. Representative before election
Bobby Bright
Democratic
Elected U.S. Representative
Martha Roby
Republican

Incumbent Democratic Congressman Bobby Bright ran for re-election to a second term, and won the Democratic primary unopposed. In the Republican primary, Montgomery City Councilwoman Martha Roby placed first with 49 percent of the vote, and advanced to a runoff election with businessman Rick Barber, while State Board of Education member Stephanie Bell placed third with 18 percent and John Bowling McKinney won 4 percent. Roby won the runoff in a landslide, and advanced to the general election against Bright. Following a close election, Roby narrowly unseated Bright, receiving 51 percent of the vote to his 49 percent.

=== Republican primary ===
==== Candidates ====
- Martha Roby, Montgomery City Councilwoman
- Rick Barber, businessman
- Stephanie Bell, member of the Alabama State Board of Education
- John Bowling McKinney

==== Results ====
Republican primary results
Party	Candidate	Votes	%
Republican	Martha Roby	36,295	48.55%
Republican	Rick Barber	21,313	28.51%
Republican	Stephanie Bell	13,797	18.46%
Republican	John Bowling McKinney	3,349	4.48%
Total votes		74,754	100.00%

==== Runoff results ====
Republican primary runoff results
Party	Candidate	Votes	%
Republican	Martha Roby	39,169	60.02%
Republican	Rick Barber	26,091	39.98%
Total votes		65,260	100.00%

=== General election ===
==== Candidates ====
- Bobby Bright, incumbent Congressman (Democratic)
- Martha Roby, Montgomery City Councilwoman (Republican)

==== Polling ====
Poll source	Dates administered	Bobby Bright (D)	Martha Roby (R)
Greenberg Quinlan Rosner Research	October 9–12, 2010	51%	39%
Public Opinion Strategies	October 3–4, 2010	43%	45%
Greenberg Quinlan Rosner Research	September 26–28, 2010	52%	43%
Greenberg Quinlan Rosner Research	August 23–26, 2010	52%	43%
Anzalone-Liszt Research†	February 8–11, 2010	54%	30%

†Internal poll commissioned by Bobby Bright

==== Predictions ====
Source	Ranking	As of
The Cook Political Report	Tossup	November 1, 2010
Rothenberg	Tilt R (flip)	November 1, 2010
Sabato's Crystal Ball	Lean D	November 1, 2010
RCP	Tossup	November 1, 2010
CQ Politics	Tossup	October 28, 2010
New York Times	Tossup	November 1, 2010
FiveThirtyEight	Lean R (flip)	November 1, 2010

==== Results ====
2010 Alabama's 2nd congressional district election
Party	Candidate	Votes	%
Republican	Martha Roby	111,645	50.97%
Democratic	Bobby Bright (inc.)	106,865	48.79%
Write-ins		518	0.24%
Total votes		219,029	100.00%
Republican gain from Democratic			

== District 3 ==
2010 Alabama's 3rd congressional district election
- November 2, 2010
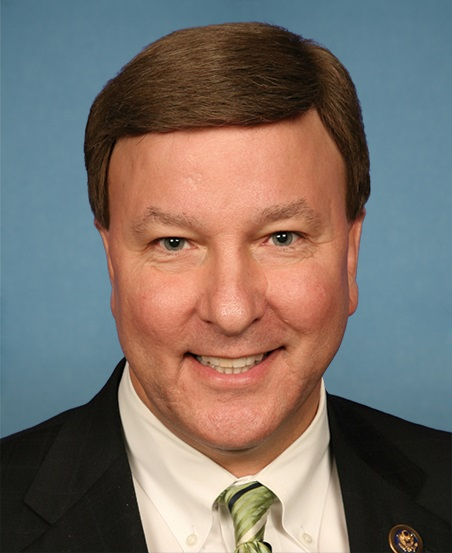

Nominee	Mike Rogers	Steve Segrest
Party	Republican	Democratic
Popular vote	117,736	80,204
Percentage	59.42%	40.48%
- County results Rogers: 50–60% 60–70% 70–80% 80–90% Segrest: 50–60% 80–90%
U.S. Representative before election
Mike Rogers
Republican
Elected U.S. Representative
Mike Rogers
Republican

Republican incumbent Mike Rogers ran for re-election to a fifth term. He faced no opponent in the Republican primary, and was challenged in the general election by Democratic nominee Steve Segrest, a pesticide inspector and the grandson of Florida Governor Napoleon B. Broward. Rogers defeated Segrest by a wide margin, receiving 59 percent of the vote to Segrest's 41 percent.

=== General election ===
==== Candidates ====
- Mike Rogers, incumbent Congressman (Republican)
- Steve Segrest, pesticide inspector (Democratic)

==== Predictions ====
Source	Ranking	As of
The Cook Political Report	Safe R	November 1, 2010
Rothenberg	Safe R	November 1, 2010
Sabato's Crystal Ball	Safe R	November 1, 2010
RCP	Safe R	November 1, 2010
CQ Politics	Safe R	October 28, 2010
New York Times	Safe R	November 1, 2010
FiveThirtyEight	Safe R	November 1, 2010

==== Results ====
2010 Alabama's 3rd congressional district election
Party	Candidate	Votes	%
Republican	Mike Rogers (inc.)	117,736	59.42%
Democratic	Steve Segrest	80,204	40.48%
Write-ins		199	0.10%
Total votes		198,139	100.00%
Republican hold			

== District 4 ==
2010 Alabama's 4th congressional district election
- November 2, 2010
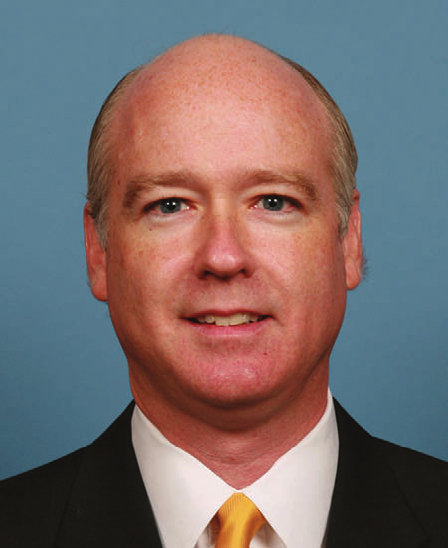
Nominee	Robert Aderholt
Party	Republican
Popular vote	167,714
Percentage	98.82%
U.S. Representative before election
Robert Aderholt
Republican
Elected U.S. Representative
Robert Aderholt
Republican

Incumbent Republican Congressman Robert Aderholt ran for re-election to an eight term. He faced no challenger in the Republican primary or general election and was re-elected unopposed.

=== General election ===
==== Candidates ====
- Robert Aderholt, incumbent Congressman (Republican)

==== Predictions ====
Source	Ranking	As of
The Cook Political Report	Safe R	November 1, 2010
Rothenberg	Safe R	November 1, 2010
Sabato's Crystal Ball	Safe R	November 1, 2010
RCP	Safe R	November 1, 2010
CQ Politics	Safe R	October 28, 2010
New York Times	Safe R	November 1, 2010
FiveThirtyEight	Safe R	November 1, 2010

==== Results ====
2010 Alabama's 4th congressional district election
Party	Candidate	Votes	%
Republican	Robert Aderholt (inc.)	167,714	98.82%
Write-ins		2,007	1.18%
Total votes		169,721	100.00%
Republican hold			

== District 5 ==
2010 Alabama's 5th congressional district election
- November 2, 2010
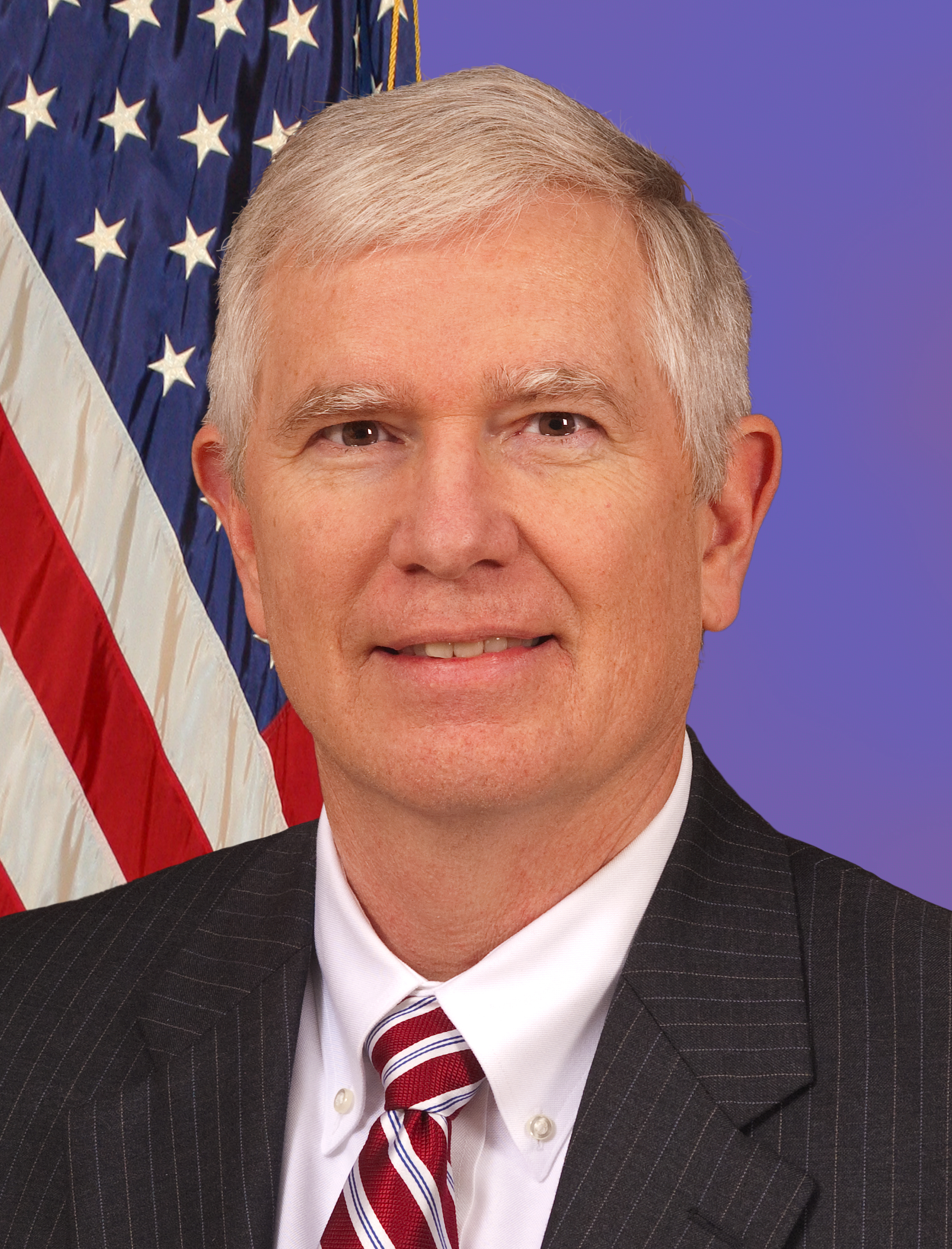

Nominee	Mo Brooks	Steve Raby
Party	Republican	Democratic
Popular vote	131,109	95,192
Percentage	57.89%	42.03%
- County results Brooks: 50–60% 60–70% Raby: 50–60%
U.S. Representative before election
Parker Griffith
Republican
Elected U.S. Representative
Mo Brooks
Republican

This district was an open seat in the general election, as incumbent Parker Griffith (who changed parties from Democratic to Republican on December 22, 2009), was defeated in the Republican primary by lawyer and county commissioner Mo Brooks.

Incumbent Congressman Parker Griffith, who was elected as a Democrat in 2008, but switched to the Republican Party in 2009, ran for re-election to a second term. He was challenged by Madison County Commissioner Mo Brooks and U.S. Navy veteran Les Phillip, who filed to run against Griffith prior to his party switch. Both continued their campaigns after Griffith's switch. Brooks ended up defeating Griffith by a wide margin, receiving 51 percent of the vote to Griffith's 33 percent and Phillip's 16 percent. In the general election, Brooks faced political consultant Steve Raby, the Democratic nominee. Brooks defeated Raby by a wide margin, winning 58-42 percent.

=== Republican primary ===
==== Candidates ====
- Parker Griffith, incumbent Congressman
- Mo Brooks, Madison County Commissioner
- Les Phillip, U.S. Navy veteran

==== Results ====
Republican primary results
Party	Candidate	Votes	%
Republican	Mo Brooks	35,746	50.81%
Republican	Parker Griffith (inc.)	23,525	33.44%
Republican	Les Phillip	11,085	15.76%
Total votes		70,356	100.00%

=== Democratic primary ===
==== Candidates ====
- Steve Raby, political consultant
- Taze Shepard, attorney, grandson of U.S. Senator John Sparkman
- Mitchell J. Howie, attorney
- David J. Maker, optical physicist, 2008 Democratic candidate for Congress

===== Declined =====
- Susan Parker, Public Service Commissioner (running for re-election)
- Ron Sparks, Commissioner of Agriculture (running for Governor)

==== Results ====
Democratic primary results
Party	Candidate	Votes	%
Democratic	Steve Raby	27,814	61.67%
Democratic	Taze Shepard	10,262	22.75%
Democratic	Mitchell J. Howie	5,277	11.70%
Democratic	David J. Maker	1,751	3.88%
Total votes		45,104	100.00%

=== General election ===
==== Candidates ====
- Mo Brooks, Madison County Commissioner (Republican)
- Steve Raby, political consultant (Democratic)

==== Polling ====
Poll source	Dates administered	Mo Brooks (R)	Steve Raby (D)
Public Opinion Strategies	August 22–23, 2010	48%	37%
Public Opinion Strategies	June 2010	48%	40%

==== Predictions ====
Source	Ranking	As of
The Cook Political Report	Likely R	November 1, 2010
Rothenberg	Safe R	November 1, 2010
Sabato's Crystal Ball	Likely R	November 1, 2010
RCP	Likely R	November 1, 2010
CQ Politics	Safe R	October 28, 2010
New York Times	Safe R	November 1, 2010
FiveThirtyEight	Likely R	November 1, 2010

==== Results ====
2010 Alabama's 5th congressional district election
Party	Candidate	Votes	%
Republican	Mo Brooks	131,109	57.89%
Democratic	Steve Raby	95,192	42.03%
Write-ins		189	0.55%
Total votes		226,490	100.00%
Republican hold			

== District 6 ==
2010 Alabama's 6th congressional district election
- November 2, 2010
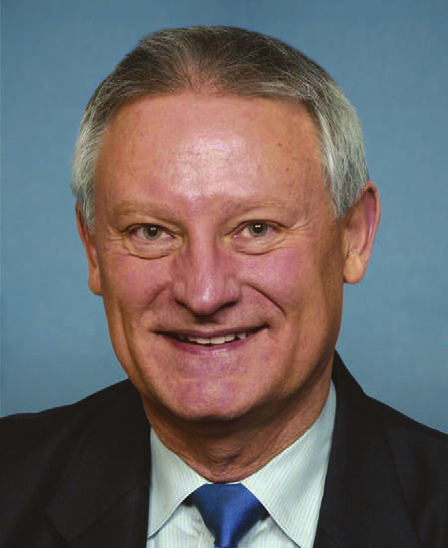
Nominee	Spencer Bachus
Party	Republican
Popular vote	205,288
Percentage	98.05%
U.S. Representative before election
Spencer Bachus
Republican
Elected U.S. Representative
Spencer Bachus
Republican

Incumbent Republican Congressman Spencer Bachus ran for re-election to a tenth term. He was challenged in the Republican primary by Stan Cooke, a pastor and antiquities dealer. He defeated Cooke by a wide margin in the primary, receiving 76 percent of the vote to Cooke's 24 percent. Bachus had no opponent in the primary or general election and was re-elected unopposed.

=== Republican primary ===
==== Candidates ====
- Spencer Bachus, incumbent Congressman
- Stan Cooke, pastor, antiquities dealer

==== Results ====
Republican primary results
Party	Candidate	Votes	%
Republican	Spencer Bachus (inc.)	80,725	75.64%
Republican	Don Cooke	25,997	24.36%
Total votes		106,722	100.00%

=== General election ===
==== Candidates ====
- Spencer Bachus, incumbent Congressman (Republican)

==== Predictions ====
Source	Ranking	As of
The Cook Political Report	Safe R	November 1, 2010
Rothenberg	Safe R	November 1, 2010
Sabato's Crystal Ball	Safe R	November 1, 2010
RCP	Safe R	November 1, 2010
CQ Politics	Safe R	October 28, 2010
New York Times	Safe R	November 1, 2010
FiveThirtyEight	Safe R	November 1, 2010

==== Results ====
2010 Alabama's 6th congressional district election
Party	Candidate	Votes	%
Republican	Spencer Bachus (inc.)	205,288	98.05%
Write-ins		4,076	1.95%
Total votes		209,364	100.00%
Republican hold			

== District 7 ==
2010 Alabama's 7th congressional district election
- November 2, 2010
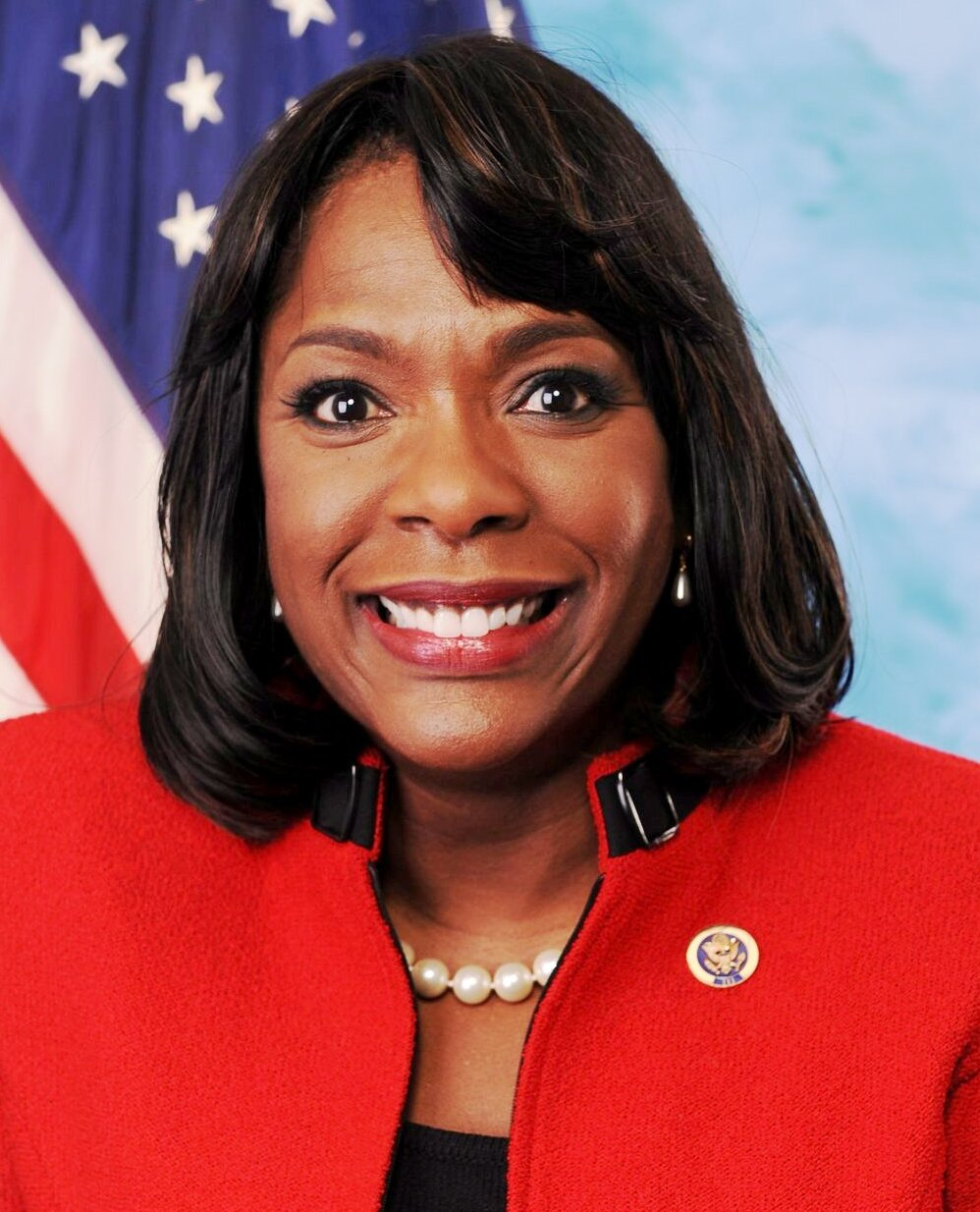

Nominee	Terri Sewell	Don Chamberlain
Party	Democratic	Republican
Popular vote	136,696	51,890
Percentage	72.43%	27.50%
- County results Sewell: 50–60% 60–70% 70–80% 80–90% Chamberlain: 50–60%
U.S. Representative before election
Artur Davis
Democratic
Elected U.S. Representative
Terri Sewell
Democratic

Incumbent Democratic Congressman Artur Davis opted to run for governor rather than seek re-election to a fifth term. Five candidates originally ran to succeed Davis in the Democratic primary: attorney Martha Bozeman; State Representative Earl Hilliard Jr., the son of former Congressman Earl Hilliard Sr.; former Selma Mayor James Perkins; attorney Terri Sewell, and Jefferson County Commissioner Sheila Smoot, though Perkins dropped out prior to the primary election. Sewell placed first in the primary, receiving 37 percent of the vote to Smoot's 29 percent, Hilliard's 27 percent, and Bozeman's 8 percent. Because no candidate received a majority, Sewell and Smoot advanced to a runoff election, which Sewell won with 55 percent of the vote.

In the general election, Sewell faced Don Chamberlain, a U.S. Marine Corps veteran and retiree. Chamberlain placed first in the Republican primary over mortgage broker Chris Salter, retired microbiology technologist Michele Weller, and nurse Carol Hendrickson, winning 38 percent of the vote. He advanced to a runoff election with Salter, which he won, 56-44 percent. Sewell entered the general election as the strong favorite, and ultimately defeated Chamberlain in a landslide, winning 72 percent of the vote to his 28 percent.

=== Democratic primary ===
==== Candidates ====
- Martha Bozeman, attorney
- Earl Hilliard Jr., State Representative, son of former Congressman Earl Hilliard Sr.
- Terri Sewell, attorney
- Sheila Smoot, Jefferson County Commissioner

===== Dropped out =====
- James Perkins, former Mayor of Selma

==== Polling ====
Poll source	Dates administered	Shelia Smoot	Earl Hilliard Jr.	Terri Sewell	Martha Bozeman	Undecided
Anzalone Liszt Research	June 13–16, 2010	33%	-	53%	-	14%
Anzalone Liszt Research	May 13–16, 2010	22%	20%	22%	7%	-
Smoot internal poll	April 2010	33%	28%	13%	-	-
Anzalone Liszt Research	January 2010	29%	25%	9%	-	-

==== Results ====
Democratic primary results
Party	Candidate	Votes	%
Democratic	Terri Sewell	31,531	36.80%
Democratic	Sheila Smoot	24,490	28.59%
Democratic	Earl Hilliard Jr.	22,981	26.82%
Democratic	Martha Bozeman	6,672	7.79%
Total votes		85,674	100.00%

==== Runoff results ====
Democratic primary results
Party	Candidate	Votes	%
Democratic	Terri Sewell	32,366	55.00%
Democratic	Sheila Smoot	26,481	45.00%
Total votes		58,847	100.00%

=== Republican primary ===
==== Candidates ====
- Don Chamberlain, U.S. Marine Corps veteran, retiree
- Carol Hendrickson, nurse
- Chris Salter, mortgage broker
- Michele Waller, retired microbiology technologist

==== Results ====
Republican primary results
Party	Candidate	Votes	%
Republican	Don Chamberlain	6,166	37.58%
Republican	Chris Salter	4,826	29.42%
Republican	Michele Waller	2,804	17.09%
Republican	Carol Hendrickson	2,610	15.91%
Total votes		16,406	100.00%

==== Runoff results ====
Republican primary runoff results
Party	Candidate	Votes	%
Republican	Don Chamberlain	11,783	55.76%
Republican	Chris Salter	9,349	44.24%
Total votes		21,132	100.00%

=== General election ===
==== Candidates ====
- Terri Sewell, attorney (Democratic)
- Don Chamberlain, U.S. Marine Corps veteran, retiree (Republican)

==== Predictions ====
Source	Ranking	As of
The Cook Political Report	Safe D	November 1, 2010
Rothenberg	Safe D	November 1, 2010
Sabato's Crystal Ball	Safe D	November 1, 2010
RCP	Safe D	November 1, 2010
CQ Politics	Safe D	October 28, 2010
New York Times	Safe D	November 1, 2010
FiveThirtyEight	Safe D	November 1, 2010

==== Results ====
2010 Alabama's 7th congressional district election
Party	Candidate	Votes	%
Democratic	Terri Sewell	136,696	72.43%
Republican	Don Chamberlain	51,890	27.50%
Write-ins		138	0.07%
Total votes		188,724	100.00%
Democratic hold			
