= MDAA =

MDAA is an acronym that may refer to:

- Muscular Dystrophy Association, formerly known as the Muscular Dystrophy Associations of America (MDAA)
- Missile Defense Advocacy Alliance, an organization advocating the development and deployment of missile defense for the United States and its allies
- Mutual Defense Assistance Act, a 1949 United States Act of Congress
