= Jay Love =

American politician

Member of the Alabama House of Representatives from the 74th district
- In office November 6, 2002 – August 2013
- Preceded by: Bob McKee
- Succeeded by: Dimitri Polizos

Personal details
- Born: August 24, 1968 (age 58) Montgomery, Alabama, U.S.
- Party: Republican
- Spouse: Cheri
- Education: Auburn University Montgomery
- Profession: Real estate broker

Jay K. Love Jr. (born August 24, 1968) is a Republican former member of the Alabama House of Representatives, representing the 74th District from November 2002 until his resignation in August 2013.

He represented part of Montgomery.

== Biography ==
Love was born in Montgomery and graduated from Auburn University Montgomery with a degree in business administration. He acquired a Subway franchise in 1992, and eventually opened 16 restaurants in the Montgomery area before selling them in 2006.

In 2008, midway through his second term, Love ran for the open seat in Alabama's 2nd congressional district after eight-term Republican Terry Everett announced his retirement. He finished first in a six candidate primary, winning 35% of the vote. His opponent in the primary run-off was Republican State Senator Harri Anne Smith. Love went on to easily beat Smith in the run-off.

He faced Democrat Bobby Bright, the mayor of Montgomery, in the general election. The race was very close, despite the 2nd's Republican voting history. It fell into Republican hands in Barry Goldwater's 1964 landslide, and Republicans hadn't let go since then. Ironically, both Love and Bright are deacons at First Baptist Church of Montgomery.

In the November election, Bright received 143,997 votes to Love's 142,231 votes—a margin of 1,766 votes, or just over 0.6 percentage points. While the two candidates each won eight of the district's 16 counties, Bright won the district's share of Montgomery County by 30 points. Love had the option of requesting a recount since the margin of victory was less than a point, but opted not to do so and conceded the seat to Bright. Jay has been married to his wife, Cheri, for 14 years and have four children: Rachel, Addison, Rebecca and Caroline. He is a deacon at First Baptist Church Montgomery which he shares with Bobby Bright. In October 2008, former governor of Massachusetts, Mitt Romney, openly supported Love and came down to Dothan, Alabama for a fundraiser for Love. .

Love did not have to give up his state House seat to run for Congress; Alabama state representatives serve four-year terms, and Love was not up for reelection again until 2010.

In 2010 Love was re-elected to the Alabama House of Representatives for the third time receiving 78% of the vote. In 2011 when the Republican Party took control of the Alabama House of Representatives Love was selected by Speaker of the House Mike Hubbard to be the Chairman of the House Ways and Means Education Committee.
