= William L. Dickinson =

American politician (1925–2008)

Bill Dickinson
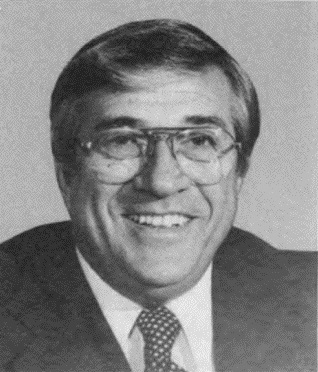
- Official portrait, 1985

Member of the U.S. House of Representatives from Alabama's 2nd district
- In office January 3, 1965 – January 3, 1993
- Preceded by: George M. Grant (redistricting)
- Succeeded by: Terry Everett

Personal details
- Born: William Louis Dickinson; June 5, 1925 Opelika, Alabama, U.S.
- Died: March 31, 2008 (aged 82) Montgomery, Alabama, U.S.
- Party: Republican (1964–2008)
- Other political affiliations: Democratic (before 1964)
- Education: University of Alabama Law School
- Occupation: Attorney

Military service
- Branch/service: United States Navy
- Battles/wars: European Theatre of World War II

William Louis Dickinson (June 5, 1925 – March 31, 2008) was an American politician. A member of the Republican Party, Dickinson served in the United States House of Representatives for Alabama's 2nd congressional district from 1965 to 1993.

== Early life ==
Dickinson was born in Opelika, Alabama. He served in the United States Navy during World War II in the European Theater. After returning from the war, he graduated from the University of Alabama School of Law.

In Opelika, Dickinson practiced law for two years beginning in 1950. In 1952, as a registered Democrat, Dickinson won his first elected office as city court judge. He then served as a juvenile court and common pleas judge in Lee County from 1954 to 1958 and judge of the Fifth Judicial Circuit of Alabama from 1958 to 1962.

While serving in the judiciary, Dickinson also sat on the Opelika Board of Education from 1954 to 1962, including a year as board president in 1961. In 1960, Dickinson co-founded the Lee County Rehabilitation Center and served on its board until 1962.

Dickinson switched careers from law to transportation in 1962 when he became assistant vice president of the Southern Railway, a position he would hold until 1964.

== Political career ==
In 1964, Dickinson was among multiple Alabama congressional candidates to change their political party registrations from Democratic to Republican, in a state that voted solidly Democratic dating back to the American Civil War. Dickinson ran for the United States House of Representatives in Alabama's 2nd congressional district, which was anchored by Montgomery and included most of the southeastern portion of the state. Benefiting from Republican presidential candidate Barry Goldwater winning Alabama, Dickinson defeated 13-term incumbent Democrat George M. Grant with nearly 62 percent of the vote. Dickinson had been the first Republican to challenge Grant for reelection.

Joining Dickinson in victory in four other House races were Jack Edwards in the 1st District, John Hall Buchanan, Jr. in the 6th District, Glenn Andrews in the 4th District and James D. Martin in the 7th District. That gave the Republicans a majority of the state's House delegation for the first time since Reconstruction after having not held any House seats in the state since 1901.

Dickinson was reelected by 9% in 1966, when Democratic gubernatorial nominee Lurleen Burns Wallace (running as a stand-in for her husband) led her party's slate to statewide victory by easily defeating Martin. Dickinson was then reelected 12 times. He usually skated to reelection, but faced close races in 1978, 1982 and 1990.

Dickinson never served in the majority during his entire 28-year House tenure. However, he became very popular in his district, even though almost none of its living residents had been represented by a Republican before. This was in part due to his reputation for strong constituent service. For instance, in 1974, when Republicans suffered heavy losses nationwide due to voter anger at the Watergate scandal, Dickinson was reelected with 66 percent of the vote. Two years later, even as Jimmy Carter became the last Democrat to date to win Alabama, Dickinson took 57 percent of the vote. Still, Democrats continued to hold most of the district's seats in the state legislature, and would continue to do so well into the 1990s.

Dickinson was an important figure in shaping national defense policies during the 1970s and 1980s. As he gained seniority, he became ranking member of the House Armed Services Committee; and was a leading member of his party's conservative wing.

In 1965, he made two speeches to Congress (on March 30 and April 27) claiming that civil rights marchers were engaged in alcohol abuse, bribery, and widespread sexual debauchery at the marches: "Drunkenness and sex orgies were the order of the day in Selma, on the road to Montgomery, and in Montgomery." Dickinson concluded that it was part of a vast communist conspiracy: "... years ago a systematic plan was started by the Communists to divide the Deep South from the rest of the Nation by the very tactics they are now using" and characterized the participants as only posturing with a "facade of righteousness, smugness and respectability erroneously attributed to them, which allowed them to invade my home town and my State like a swarm of rats leaving an overturned hayrick."

After Dickinson's April 27, 1965 speech, which included several sworn affidavits, Congressmen William Fitts Ryan (D-NY) and Joseph Yale Resnick (D-NY) rose in a blistering defense of the march and Dr. King. Ryan noted the deliberate attempt to smear the marchers: "I am sure that the gentleman from Alabama remembered the old legal adage: When you do not have the facts on your side, try the opposition." Resnick read testimonials from religious leaders present at the marches, all of whom denied the allegations laid by Dickinson. Religious leaders present at the marches denied the charges, and local and national journalists were unable to substantiate his accounts. Attorney General Nicholas Katzenbach stated that "Communists' have been remarkably unsuccessful in influencing any decisions and certainly have not capture any of the leadership [of organized civil rights groups]." The allegations of segregation supporters were collected in Robert M. Mikell's pro-segregationist book Selma (Charlotte, 1965).

In 1982, Dickinson was re-elected by only 0.8% over Alabama Public Service Commission President Billy Joe Camp, his first competitive contest since his initial run in 1964.

Dickinson voted against the Abandoned Shipwrecks Act of 1987. The Act asserts United States title to certain abandoned shipwrecks located on or embedded in submerged lands under state jurisdiction, and transfers title to the respective state, thereby empowering states to manage these cultural and historical resources more efficiently, with the goal of preventing treasure hunters and salvagers from damaging them. Despite his vote against it, President Ronald Reagan signed it into law on April 28, 1988.

In 1990, Dickinson was re-elected by only 2.5% over state welfare commissioner Faye Baggiano, his second competitive contest since 1982. The closeness of the race prompted Dickinson to decide against running for a 15th term in the 1992 elections, even though redistricting made the district safer for him on paper by shifting most of his black constituents to the 7th District. He is the longest-serving Republican congressman in Alabama's history.

== Death ==
Dickinson died at 82 of colon cancer at his home in Montgomery, Alabama.

U.S. House of Representatives
Preceded by George M. Grant	Member of the U.S. House of Representatives from Alabama's 2nd congressional district 1965–1993	Succeeded by Terry Everett
Preceded by Samuel L. Devine	Ranking Member of the House Administration Committee; 1973–1981	Succeeded by Bill Frenzel
Preceded by Bob Wilson	Ranking Member of the House Armed Services Committee; 1981–1993	Succeeded by Floyd Spence
