= Harri Anne Smith =

American politician

Member of the Alabama Senate from the 29th district
- In office 1998 – November 7, 2018
- Preceded by: Chip Bailey
- Succeeded by: Donnie Chesteen

Mayor of Slocomb
- In office 1996–1998

Member of the Slocomb City Council
- In office 1989–1998

Personal details
- Born: January 20, 1962 (age 64) Houston County, Alabama, U.S.
- Party: Independent (2010–present); Republican (1998–2010)
- Spouse: Charlie Smith
- Education: Troy State University
- Profession: Banker

Harri Anne Smith (born January 20, 1962) is a former independent member of the Alabama Senate, representing the 29th District from 1998 to 2018. She has been elected to five terms in the state senate and is also a former mayor of her hometown of Slocomb, in the Wiregrass Region.

== Early life, education, and early political career ==
Smith was born in Houston County, Alabama, and graduated from Slocomb High School. She has a B.A. in business administration from Troy State University. She was executive vice president of Friend Bank. She was a member of the board of directors and served as president of Slocomb National Bank.

She started her political career in 1989 as an appointed member of the Slocomb City Council. She was then elected to the Slocomb city council (non-partisan) and elected mayor in 1996.

== Alabama Senate ==
=== Elections ===
In 1998, she challenged Republican state senator Chip Bailey of Alabama's 29th senate district. She defeated him in the primary 47%-44%. In November, she defeated Democratic nominee Mac Palmer 61%-39%.

In 2002, she won re-election to a second term unopposed. In 2006, she won re-election to a third term, defeating Democratic nominee Ronnie Helms 75%-25%.

Smith ran in the Republican primary for Alabama's 2nd congressional district in 2008, losing to State Representative Jay Love. Afterwards, she endorsed the Democratic nominee, Bobby Bright—a decision that nearly got her expelled from the Geneva County Republican Executive Committee.

The Republican Party of Alabama barred her from running for reelection to her state senate seat as a Republican in 2010; her endorsement of Bright violated a state party bylaw that bars an elected Republican from endorsing a candidate from another party when a Republican is running. However, in June, she garnered enough signatures in her district to run as an independent. She won re-election to a fourth term, defeating Republican challenger George Flowers 55%-45%.

A month before the election, she had been indicted on federal charges of bribery and corruption. Smith was found not guilty and was acquitted of all charges in March 2012.

Notwithstanding her disagreements with (and expulsion from) the Republican Party, Smith caucuses with them on issues.

=== Committee assignments ===
- Commerce, Transportation, and Utilities
- Confirmations (vice chair)
- Health
- Local Legislation Number 1
- Tourism and Marketing
- Veterans and Military Affairs

== Personal life ==
Her husband, Charlie Smith, is a native of Geneva County, Alabama and serves as a colonel in the United States Army Reserve. Harri Anne and Charlie live in Slocomb, where they are members of the First Baptist Church.
