= Alabama's 29th Senate district =

Alabama's 29th State Senate district
Senator
Donnie Chesteen; R–Geneva
- Demographics: 72.2% White; 17.8% Black; 4.9% Hispanic; 1.1% Asian
- Population (2022): 142,415

Alabama's 29th Senate district is one of 35 districts in the Alabama Senate. The district has been represented by Donnie Chesteen since 2018.

== Geography ==
Election	Map	Counties in District
2026; 2022		Geneva, portions of Dale, Houston
2018		Geneva, portions of Dale, Houston
2014		Geneva, portions of Dale, Houston
2010; 2006; 2002		Geneva, portions of Dale, Houston

== Election history ==
=== Elections in the 2020s ===
Alabama Senate election, 2022: Senate District 29
Party	Candidate	Votes	%	±%
Republican	Donnie Chesteen (Incumbent)	31,576	81.36	−11.86
Democratic	Nathan Mathis	6,476	16.69	+16.69
Libertarian	Floyd McBroom	737	1.90	+1.90
Write-in		20	0.05	-6.73
Majority		25,100	64.68	−21.76
Turnout		38,809		
Republican hold				

=== Elections in the 2010s ===
Alabama Senate election, 2018: Senate District 29
Party	Candidate	Votes	%	±%
Republican	Donnie Chesteen	34,273	93.22	+45.79
Write-in		2,492	6.78	+6.59
Majority		31,781	86.44	+81.49
Turnout		36,765		
Republican gain from Independent				

Alabama Senate election, 2014: Senate District 29
Party	Candidate	Votes	%	±%
Independent	Harri Anne Smith (Incumbent)	17,830	52.38	−2.83
Republican	Melinda McClendon	16,145	47.43	+2.83
Write-in		63	0.19	+0.00
Majority		1,685	4.95	−5.66
Turnout		34,038		
Independent hold				

Alabama Senate election, 2010: Senate District 29
Party	Candidate	Votes	%	±%
Independent	Harri Anne Smith (Incumbent)	23,800	55.21	+55.21
Republican	George Flowers	19,225	44.60	−30.60
Write-in		84	0.19	+0.10
Majority		4,575	10.61	−39.88
Turnout		43,109		
Independent gain from Republican				

=== Elections in the 2000s ===
Alabama Senate election, 2006: Senate District 29
Party	Candidate	Votes	%	±%
Republican	Harri Anne Smith (Incumbent)	26,507	75.20	−23.48
Democratic	Ronnie Helms	8,710	24.71	+24.71
Write-in		33	0.09	-1.23
Majority		17,797	50.49	−46.87
Turnout		35,250		
Republican hold				

Smith left the Republican Party in 2010 after being barred from running for re-election as a Republican.

Alabama Senate election, 2002: Senate District 29
Party	Candidate	Votes	%	±%
Republican	Harri Anne Smith (Incumbent)	28,584	98.68	+37.61
Write-in		383	1.32	+1.14
Majority		28,201	97.36	+75.04
Turnout		28,967		
Republican hold				

=== Elections in the 1990s ===
Alabama Senate election, 1998: Senate District 29
Party	Candidate	Votes	%	±%
Republican	Harri Anne Smith	18,870	61.07	+61.07
Democratic	Mac Palmer	11,973	38.75	−61.01
Write-in		56	0.18	-0.06
Majority		6,897	22.32	−77.20
Turnout		30,899		
Republican gain from Democratic				

Alabama Senate election, 1994: Senate District 29
Party	Candidate	Votes	%	±%
Democratic	Chip Bailey (Incumbent)	18,654	99.76	+33.10
Write-in		45	0.24	+0.23
Majority		18,609	99.52	+66.20
Turnout		18,699		
Democratic hold				

Bailey joined the Republican Party in 1997.

Alabama Senate election, 1990: Senate District 29
Party	Candidate	Votes	%	±%
Democratic	Chip Bailey (Incumbent)	23,073	66.66	−33.34
Republican	Mimi Page	11,539	33.34	+33.34
Write-in		3	0.01	+0.01
Majority		11,534	33.32	−66.68
Turnout		34,615		
Democratic hold				

=== Elections in the 1980s ===
Alabama Senate election, 1986: Senate District 29
Party	Candidate	Votes	%	±%
Democratic	Chip Bailey (Incumbent)	22,973	100.00	+0.03
Majority		22,973	100.00	+0.05
Turnout		22,973		
Democratic hold				

Alabama Senate election, 1983: Senate District 29
Party	Candidate	Votes	%	±%
Democratic	Chip Bailey	3,956	99.97	+17.03
Write-in		1	0.03	+0.03
Majority		3,955	99.95	+34.07
Turnout		3,957		
Democratic hold				

Alabama Senate election, 1982: Senate District 29
Party	Candidate	Votes	%	±%
Democratic	Earl Goodwin (Incumbent)	25,733	82.94	
Republican	John Grimes Jr.	5,293	17.06	
Write-in		1	0.00	
Majority		20,440	65.88	
Turnout		31,027		
Democratic hold				

== District officeholders ==
Senators take office at midnight on the day of their election.

- Donnie Chesteen (2018–present)
- Harri Anne Smith (1998–2018)
- Chip Bailey (1983–1998)
- Earl Goodwin (1976–1983)
- Walter C. Givhan (1974–1976)

Not in use 1966–1974.

- Kenneth Hammond (1962–1966)
- George E. Godfrey (1958–1962)
- M. H. Moses (1954–1958)
