= George M. Grant =

American politician (1897–1982)

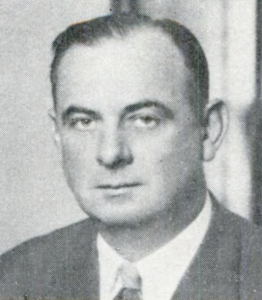

Member of the U.S. House of Representatives from Alabama
- In office June 14, 1938 – January 3, 1965
- Preceded by: J. Lister Hill
- Succeeded by: William L. Dickinson (redistricting)
- Constituency: 2nd district (1938-1963); At-large (1963–1965)

Personal details
- Born: George McInvale Grant; July 11, 1897 Louisville, Alabama
- Died: November 4, 1982 (aged 85) At sea, aboard the Queen Elizabeth II
- Resting place: Arlington National Cemetery
- Party: Democratic
- Spouse: Matalie Carter (m. 1938)
- Children: 2
- Education: University of Alabama
- Military career
- Branch: U.S. Army Signal Corps
- Conflicts: World War I

George McInvale Grant (July 11, 1897 – November 4, 1982) was an American lawyer, military veteran, and politician who served 14 terms as a Democratic Representative from Alabama from 1938 to 1965.

== Early life ==
George McInvale Grant was born in Louisville, Alabama, on July 11, 1897. He attended public schools in Louisville. He obtained a Bachelor of Laws from the University of Alabama School of Law in 1922. He was admitted to the bar the same year and opened a law practice in Troy, Alabama, near Montgomery. He served as the national secretary of Pi Kappa Phi in 1922.

== Career ==
He was a private and aviation cadet in the aviation section of the Signal Corps of the United States Army in 1918 and 1919. He was county solicitor (district attorney) of Pike County, Alabama from 1927 to 1937.

=== Political career ===
When Representative Lister Hill was appointed to the U.S. Senate in 1938, Grant won the Democratic nomination to succeed him in the special election. Then, Democratic nomination was tantamount to election in Alabama, and he took office on June 14, 1938. He won a full term that November. Grant's foreign policy views were described as "pro-British, anti-communist and otherwise indifferent to the world outside of the United States." Grant voted in favor of the 1941 Lend Lease Act to provide material aid for the British military. This act provided "ammunition, tanks, airplanes, trucks, and food" to the British army. Grant was reelected 11 more times from the Montgomery-based district until January 3, 1965. Having signed the 1956 Southern Manifesto that opposed the desegregation of public schools ordered by the Supreme Court in Brown v. Board of Education, in 1957 he voted against the Civil Rights Act of 1957. He was a member of the United States House Committee on Agriculture and was the author of the Multiple-Use Sustained-Yield Act of 1960.

In 1964, Grant faced credible opposition in the Democratic primary for only the third time in his career when former Rear Admiral John G. Crommelin challenged him. Crommelin ran well to Grant's right, giving speeches full of racist and anti-Semitic rhetoric. Grant defeated Crommerlin by a more than 2-to-1 margin. In November, he faced a Republican for the first time ever in William Louis Dickinson. Grant lost by a shocking 25-point margin, which was all the more remarkable since most of the district's living residents had never been represented by a Republican.

=== Affiliations ===
He was a member of the board of trustees at Bob Jones University. He was president of the Dixie Amateur League in 1935 and served as the head of Alabama–Florida League until 1938.

== Personal life ==
Grant married Matalie Carter, a schoolteacher from Munford, Alabama, on December 5, 1938. Together, they had a son and a daughter, George and Alicia.

== Later life and death ==
Grant returned to his law practice in Troy, but later moved to Washington, D.C., and became a lobbyist. He lived in Washington until the time of his death on November 4, 1982, at sea, aboard the Queen Elizabeth II. He was interred at Arlington National Cemetery in Arlington, Virginia.

== Awards ==
Grant was awarded an honorary L.L.D. at Bob Jones University in 1950.

U.S. House of Representatives
Preceded by J. Lister Hill	Member of the U.S. House of Representatives from Alabama's 2nd congressional district June 14, 1938 – January 3, 1963	Succeeded by District inactive
Preceded by District inactive	Member of the U.S. House of Representatives from Alabama's at-large congressional district January 3, 1963 – January 3, 1965	Succeeded by District inactive
