= Monroe Journal =

The Monroe Journal
- Type: Weekly newspaper
- Format: Broadsheet
- Owner(s): Journal, Inc.
- Publisher: Bo Bolton
- Editor: Mike Qualls
- Founded: 1866
- Headquarters: Monroeville, Alabama
- Circulation: 19,000
- Website: monroejournal.com

The Monroe Journal is a weekly newspaper from Monroeville, Alabama serving the city and surrounding area.

== History ==
The Monroe Journal is the oldest and the longest-running newspaper in Monroe County, Alabama. The paper was founded in 1866 in Clairborne. It moved to Monroeville sometime after its 1867 sale by L. M. Brewer. It was purchased by Q. Salter in 1887, when he was just 20 years old. It would remain in the Salter Family for 64 years. By 1916 it had linotype and power-driven presses.

From 1929 to 1947 A.C. Lee, father of Harper Lee and the model for Atticus Finch, was editor and part-owner of the Journal.

Q.M. Salter died in 1938, two years after selling his interest the Journal.

During Reconstruction, its editorials and published letters took a "staunchly pro-white and pro-Southern stance," and in the 1920s, when the Montgomery Advertiser spoke out against the Ku Klux Klan, the Journal portrayed them as hysterical, saying "Just what good purpose the Advertiser imagines might be served by unrestrained denunciation of this particular form of criminality we fail to fathom."

However, by the 1950s, the Journal had shifted its stance, speaking against the Ku Klux Klan, telling them to "direct its attacks at the Journal and other strong business interests rather than trying to intimidate local black citizens."
