= Amasa Coleman Lee =

American lawyer, newspaper editor, and politician (1880-1962)

Member of the Alabama House of Representatives from the Monroe County district
- In office 1927–1939

Personal details
- Born: July 19, 1880 Georgiana, Alabama, U.S.
- Died: April 15, 1962 (aged 81) Monroeville, Alabama, U.S.
- Children: 4, including Harper

Amasa Coleman Lee (July 19, 1880 – April 15, 1962) was an American newspaper editor, politician and lawyer. He was the father of acclaimed novelist Harper Lee.

== Family ==
Lee was born in Georgiana, Alabama, in 1880 to Cader Alexander Lee, a Confederate veteran, and his wife, the former Theodosia Windham. He was distantly related to Robert E. Lee. He was raised on a farm in or near Chipley, Florida, due south of Butler County. Though he had few years of formal education (and none at a college), Lee passed the Alabama teacher's exam, and moved to Monroe County, Alabama to teach.

On June 22, 1910, Lee married Frances Cunningham Finch, the daughter of a local postmaster in Monroe County, the unincorporated community of Finchburg being named after an ancestor. They had three daughters. His youngest daughter, Harper Lee, wrote the award-winning novel To Kill a Mockingbird. Atticus Finch, the lawyer character in the novel, is reputedly based, at least in part, on Amasa Coleman Lee.

== Early career ==
In addition to teaching school, A.C. Lee became a clerk/bookkeeper at the Flat Creek sawmill in Finchburg. In 1912 the Lees moved to Monroeville, the county seat, which had about 1,300 residents in the 1930s. He managed a small logging railroad line in nearby Manistee, the Manistee & Repton Railway, for a law firm, then called Barnett & Bugg.

== Legal and political career ==
In 1915, having read law under the guidance of the Barnett & Bugg lawyers, Lee passed the Alabama bar exam and began to practice law, mainly in Monroe County. When he became a partner, the firm was renamed Barnett, Bugg & Lee. In 1929, Lee bought the Monroe Journal, which he would own and edit until 1947. As a lawyer, Lee represented various individuals in Monroe and surrounding counties, as well as the railway. Before Lee concentrated on real estate title legal work, he once defended two black men accused of murdering a white storekeeper. Both clients, a father and son, were hanged.

From 1927 to 1939, Lee won election three times to four-year terms representing Monroe County part-time in the Alabama House of Representatives. After World War II, he practiced law with his eldest daughter Alice and hoped to also bring in his youngest daughter Nelle Harper Lee and rename the firm "A.C. Lee and Daughters", but that dream never materialized. After traveling in Europe, Nelle Harper Lee moved to New York City to become a writer, following the track of her friend Truman Capote. Within six weeks in 1951, after his youngest daughter moved to New York, Lee lost both his wife (who long suffered fragile health and died of cardiac arrest days after receiving a cancer diagnosis) and son (a pilot who succumbed to an aneurysm in his barracks), so he sold the family home and moved into a smaller house with his daughter (and business partner) Alice.

== Death and legacy ==
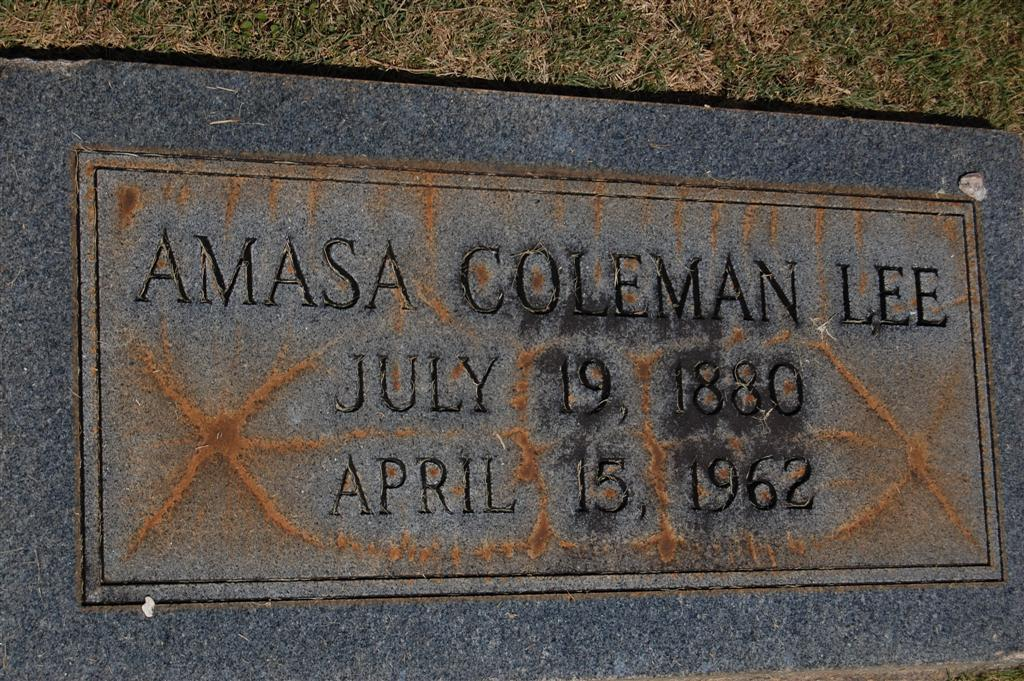
Lee's gravesite at Hillcrest Cemetery

Lee grew proud of his youngest daughter's success with To Kill a Mockingbird, even though she never joined the family law firm, and in his final years often signed copies of his daughter's novel as "Atticus Finch", the central character. Nonetheless, he had suffered bouts of debilitating fatigue following the loss of his wife and son. Lee died in Monroeville, Alabama on Palm Sunday, 1962, and was buried there at Hillcrest Cemetery. The following year Gregory Peck carried Lee's pocket watch as he accepted an Academy Award for portraying Atticus Finch in the movie version.
