= Alabama's 2nd congressional district =

US House district for Alabama

Coordinates: 31°38′38.5″N 86°2′41.72″W

- Interactive map of district boundaries
- Representative: Shomari Figures; D–Mobile
- Area: 10,608 mi^{2} (27,470 km^{2})
- Distribution: 54.71% urban; 45.29% rural
- Population (2025): 707,641
- Median household income: $59,280
- Ethnicity: 49.9% White; 39.7% Black; 4.6% Hispanic; 1.8% Asian
- Cook PVI: R+7

Alabama's 2nd congressional district is a United States congressional district in Alabama, which elects a representative to the United States House of Representatives. It shares most of Montgomery metropolitan area, and includes the city of Mobile, and stretches into the Wiregrass Region in the eastern portion of the state. The district encompasses portions of Clarke and Mobile counties and the entirety of Barbour, Bullock, Butler, Conecuh, Crenshaw, Macon, Monroe, Montgomery, Pike, Russell, and Washington counties. Other cities in the district include Greenville and Troy.

The district is represented by Democrat Shomari Figures, after being elected in 2024.

The 2nd was completely overhauled in advance of the 2024 elections, as a consequence of the United States Supreme Court's decision in Allen v. Milligan, which ordered Alabama to create a second black opportunity district. Following this, the United States District Court for the Northern District of Alabama appointed a special master to create new maps for the state, which resulted in the 2nd joining the 7th as the state's two opportunity districts. Representative Barry Moore's home county of Coffee was drawn out of this district and into the 1st, where he decided to run instead.

== Character ==
There are several small-to-medium-sized cities spread throughout the district. Fort Novosel and Maxwell-Gunter Air Force Base are both within its bounds, as is Troy University.

White voters here were among the first in Alabama to shift from the Democratic Party; the old-line Southern Democrats in this area began splitting their tickets as early as the 1950s. Southeast Alabama is one of the most Republican regions in both Alabama and the nation. It has only supported a Democrat for president once since 1956, when Jimmy Carter carried it in 1976.

In 2008, voters elected three-term mayor of Montgomery Bobby Bright to Congress, making him the first Democrat to hold the seat since 1964. Bright then lost reelection to Republican Martha Roby in 2010, who was a member of the Montgomery City Council. Roby did not run for reelection in the 2020 election, and Republican Barry Moore was elected to the open seat. At the state and local level, however, conservative Democrats continued to hold most offices as late as 2002.

In the 2008 United States presidential election, voters gave John McCain, the Republican presidential candidate, 63.42% of the vote; Barack Obama, the Democratic candidate, received 36.05%, attracting voters beyond the substantial (and expected) African-American minority.

The district gives its congressmen very long tenures in Washington; only six people have represented it from 1923 to 2021, with five of six holding it for at least 10 years and four of six holding it for at least 15 years. Barry Moore, elected in 2021, represented the district when it was redrawn in 2023; since the district was redrawn, he has continued his congressional career in the neighboring 1st district.

The new 2nd district includes the heavier African American communities of Butler, Macon, Monroe, Pike, and Russell counties as well as the state capital of Montgomery, Alabama.

== Counties and communities within the district ==
For the 119th and successive Congresses (based on the districts drawn following the Supreme Court's decision in Allen v. Milligan), the district contains all or portions of the following counties and communities.

Barbour County (6)

All six communities

Bullock County (3)

All three communities

Butler County (3)

All three communities

Clarke County (3)

Carlton, Jackson (part; also 7th), Rockville

Conecuh County (4)

All four communities

Crenshaw County (6)

All six communities

Macon County (4)

All four communities

Mobile County (8)

Chickasaw, Chunchula, Citronelle, Gulfcrest, Mobile (part; also 1st), Prichard (part; also 1st), Semmes, Tillmans Corner (part; also 1st)

Monroe County (8)

All eight communities

Montgomery County (2)

Montgomery, Pike Road

Pike County (4)

All four communities

Russell County (3)

All three communities

Washington County (12)

All 12 communities

== Recent election results from statewide races ==
The following chart shows the results of recent federal and statewide races in the 2nd district.

Year	Office	Winner	D %	R %
2012	President	Mitt Romney (R)	36.4%	62.8%
2016	President	Donald Trump (R)	33.0%	64.3%
2016	Senate	Richard Shelby (R)	34.3%	65.5%
2017	Senate (special)	Roy Moore (R)	45.4%	53.4%
2018	Governor	Kay Ivey (R)	35.9%	63.9%
2018	Lieutenant Governor	Will Ainsworth (R)	36.0%	64.0%
2018	Attorney General	Steve Marshall (R)	39.1%	60.8%
2020	President	Donald Trump (R)	35.2%	63.6%
2020	Senate	Tommy Tuberville (R)	38.2%	61.7%
Redistricted for the 2022 cycle
2022	Senate	Katie Britt (R)	28.4%	69.6%
2022	Governor	Kay Ivey (R)	27.0%	69.8%
2022	Attorney General	Steve Marshall (R)	29.5%	70.4%
2022	Secretary of State	Wes Allen (R)	28.6%	68.8%
Redistricted for the 2024 cycle
2024	President	Kamala Harris (D)	53.4%	45.3%

== List of members representing the district ==
Member	Party	Years	Cong ress	Electoral history	District location
District created March 4, 1823
John McKee (Tuscaloosa)	Democratic-Republican	March 4, 1823 – March 3, 1825	18th 19th 20th	Elected in 1823. Re-elected in 1825. Re-elected in 1827. Retired.	1823–1833 "Middle district": Bibb, Blount, Franklin, Greene, Jefferson, Marengo, Marion, Morgan, Perry, Pickens, Saint Clair, Shelby, and Tuscaloosa counties
John McKee (Tuscaloosa)	Jacksonian	March 4, 1825– March 3, 1829	18th 19th 20th	Elected in 1823. Re-elected in 1825. Re-elected in 1827. Retired.	1823–1833 "Middle district": Bibb, Blount, Franklin, Greene, Jefferson, Marengo, Marion, Morgan, Perry, Pickens, Saint Clair, Shelby, and Tuscaloosa counties
Robert Emmett Bledsoe Baylor (Tuscaloosa)	Jacksonian	March 4, 1829 – March 3, 1831		Elected in 1829. Lost re-election.	1823–1833 "Middle district": Bibb, Blount, Franklin, Greene, Jefferson, Marengo, Marion, Morgan, Perry, Pickens, Saint Clair, Shelby, and Tuscaloosa counties
Samuel Wright Mardis (Montevallo)	Jacksonian	March 4, 1831 – March 3, 1833		Elected in 1831. Redistricted to the 3rd district.	1823–1833 "Middle district": Bibb, Blount, Franklin, Greene, Jefferson, Marengo, Marion, Morgan, Perry, Pickens, Saint Clair, Shelby, and Tuscaloosa counties
John McKinley (Florence)	Jacksonian	March 4, 1833 – March 3, 1835		Elected in 1833. Retired.	1833–1841
Joshua L. Martin (Athens)	Jacksonian	March 4, 1835 – March 3, 1837	24th 25th	Elected in 1835	1833–1841
Joshua L. Martin (Athens)	Democratic	March 4, 1837 – March 3, 1839	24th 25th	Re-elected in 1837. Retired.	1833–1841
David Hubbard (Courtland)	Democratic	March 4, 1839 – March 3, 1841		Elected in 1839. Redistricted to the at-large district and lost re-election.	1833–1841
District inactive		March 3, 1841 – March 3, 1843		All representatives elected at-large.	
James Edwin Belser (Montgomery)	Democratic	March 4, 1843 – March 3, 1845		Elected in 1843. Retired.	1843–1855
Henry Washington Hilliard (Montgomery)	Whig	March 4, 1845 – March 3, 1851	29th 30th 31st	Elected in 1845. Re-elected in 1847. Re-elected in 1849. Retired.	1843–1855
James Abercrombie (Girard)	Whig	March 4, 1851 – March 3, 1855	32nd 33rd	Elected in 1851. Re-elected in 1853. Retired.	1843–1855
Eli Sims Shorter (Eufaula)	Democratic	March 4, 1855 – March 3, 1859	34th 35th	Elected in 1855. Re-elected in 1857. Retired.	1855–1863
James L. Pugh (Eufaula)	Democratic	March 4, 1859 – January 21, 1861		Elected in 1859. Withdrew due to Civil War.	1855–1863
Vacant		January 21, 1861 – July 21, 1868	36th 37th 38th 39th 40th	Civil War and Reconstruction	
Charles Waldron Buckley (Montgomery)	Republican	July 21, 1868 – March 3, 1873	40th 41st 42nd	Elected to finish the partial term. Re-elected in 1868. Re-elected in 1870. Retired.	1863–1877
James T. Rapier (Montgomery)	Republican	March 4, 1873 – March 3, 1875		Elected in 1872. Lost re-election.	1863–1877
Jeremiah Norman Williams (Clayton)	Democratic	March 4, 1875 – March 3, 1877		Elected in 1874. Redistricted to the 3rd district.	1863–1877
Hilary A. Herbert (Montgomery)	Democratic	March 4, 1877 – March 3, 1893	45th 46th 47th 48th 49th 50th 51st 52nd	Elected in 1876. Re-elected in 1878. Re-elected in 1880. Re-elected in 1882. Re-elected in 1884. Re-elected in 1886. Re-elected in 1888. Re-elected in 1890. Retired.	1877–1893
Jesse F. Stallings (Greenville)	Democratic	March 4, 1893 – March 3, 1901	53rd 54th 55th 56th	Elected in 1892. Re-elected in 1894. Re-elected in 1896. Re-elected in 1898. Retired.	1893–1933
Ariosto A. Wiley (Montgomery)	Democratic	March 4, 1901 – June 17, 1908	57th 58th 59th 60th	Elected in 1900. Re-elected in 1902. Re-elected in 1904. Re-elected in 1906. Died.	1893–1933
Vacant		June 17, 1908 – November 3, 1908			1893–1933
Oliver C. Wiley (Troy)	Democratic	November 3, 1908 – March 3, 1909		Elected to finish his brother's term. Retired.	1893–1933
S. Hubert Dent Jr.(Montgomery)	Democratic	March 4, 1909 – March 3, 1921	61st 62nd 63rd 64th 65th 66th	Elected in 1908. Re-elected in 1910. Re-elected in 1912. Re-elected in 1914. Re-elected in 1916. Re-elected in 1918. Lost renomination.	1893–1933
John R. Tyson (Montgomery)	Democratic	March 4, 1921 – March 27, 1923	67th 68th	Elected in 1920. Re-elected in 1922. Died.	1893–1933
Vacant		March 27, 1923 – August 14, 1923			1893–1933
J. Lister Hill (Montgomery)	Democratic	August 14, 1923 – January 11, 1938	68th 69th 70th 71st 72nd 73rd 74th 75th	Elected to finish Tyson's term. Re-elected in 1924. Re-elected in 1926. Re-elected in 1928. Re-elected in 1930. Re-elected in 1932. Re-elected in 1934. Re-elected in 1936. Resigned when appointed US Senator.	1893–1933
J. Lister Hill (Montgomery)	Democratic	August 14, 1923 – January 11, 1938	68th 69th 70th 71st 72nd 73rd 74th 75th	Elected to finish Tyson's term. Re-elected in 1924. Re-elected in 1926. Re-elected in 1928. Re-elected in 1930. Re-elected in 1932. Re-elected in 1934. Re-elected in 1936. Resigned when appointed US Senator.	1933–1963
Vacant		January 11, 1938 – June 14, 1938			1933–1963
George M. Grant (Troy)	Democratic	June 14, 1938 – January 3, 1963	75th 76th 77th 78th 79th 80th 81st 82nd 83rd 84th 85th 86th 87th	Elected to finish Hill's term. Re-elected in 1938. Re-elected in 1940. Re-elected in 1942. Re-elected in 1944. Re-elected in 1946. Re-elected in 1948. Re-elected in 1950. Re-elected in 1952. Re-elected in 1954. Re-elected in 1956. Re-elected in 1958. Re-elected in 1960. Redistricted to the At-large district.	1933–1963
District inactive		January 3, 1963 – January 3, 1965		All representatives elected at-large.	
William L. Dickinson (Montgomery)	Republican	January 3, 1965 – January 3, 1993	89th 90th 91st 92nd 93rd 94th 95th 96th 97th 98th 99th 100th 101st 102nd	Elected in 1964. Re-elected in 1966. Re-elected in 1968. Re-elected in 1970. Re-elected in 1972. Re-elected in 1974. Re-elected in 1976. Re-elected in 1978. Re-elected in 1980. Re-elected in 1982. Re-elected in 1984. Re-elected in 1986. Re-elected in 1988. Re-elected in 1990. Retired.	1965–1973
William L. Dickinson (Montgomery)	Republican	January 3, 1965 – January 3, 1993	89th 90th 91st 92nd 93rd 94th 95th 96th 97th 98th 99th 100th 101st 102nd	Elected in 1964. Re-elected in 1966. Re-elected in 1968. Re-elected in 1970. Re-elected in 1972. Re-elected in 1974. Re-elected in 1976. Re-elected in 1978. Re-elected in 1980. Re-elected in 1982. Re-elected in 1984. Re-elected in 1986. Re-elected in 1988. Re-elected in 1990. Retired.	1973–1993
Terry Everett (Enterprise)	Republican	January 3, 1993 – January 3, 2009	103rd 104th 105th 106th 107th 108th 109th 110th	Elected in 1992. Re-elected in 1994. Re-elected in 1996. Re-elected in 1998. Re-elected in 2000. Re-elected in 2002. Re-elected in 2004. Re-elected in 2006. Retired.	1993–2003
Terry Everett (Enterprise)	Republican	January 3, 1993 – January 3, 2009	103rd 104th 105th 106th 107th 108th 109th 110th	Elected in 1992. Re-elected in 1994. Re-elected in 1996. Re-elected in 1998. Re-elected in 2000. Re-elected in 2002. Re-elected in 2004. Re-elected in 2006. Retired.	2003–2013
Bobby Bright (Montgomery)	Democratic	January 3, 2009 – January 3, 2011		Elected in 2008. Lost re-election.	2003–2013
Martha Roby (Montgomery)	Republican	January 3, 2011 – January 3, 2021	112th 113th 114th 115th 116th	Elected in 2010. Re-elected in 2012. Re-elected in 2014. Re-elected in 2016. Re-elected in 2018. Retired.	2003–2013
Martha Roby (Montgomery)	Republican	January 3, 2011 – January 3, 2021	112th 113th 114th 115th 116th	Elected in 2010. Re-elected in 2012. Re-elected in 2014. Re-elected in 2016. Re-elected in 2018. Retired.	2013–2023
Barry Moore (Enterprise)	Republican	January 3, 2021 – January 3, 2025	117th 118th	Elected in 2020. Re-elected in 2022. Redistricted to the 1st district.	2013–2023
Barry Moore (Enterprise)	Republican	January 3, 2021 – January 3, 2025	117th 118th	Elected in 2020. Re-elected in 2022. Redistricted to the 1st district.	2023–2025
Shomari Figures (Mobile)	Democratic	January 3, 2025 – present	119th	Elected in 2024. Re-elected in 2026.	2025–2027
Shomari Figures (Mobile)	Democratic	January 3, 2025 – present	119th	Elected in 2024. Re-elected in 2026.	2027–present

== Recent election results ==
These are the results from the previous thirteen election cycles in Alabama's 2nd district.

=== 2002 ===
2002 Alabama's 2nd congressional district election
Party	Candidate	Votes	%
Republican	Terry Everett (incumbent)	129,233	68.75
Democratic	Charles Woods	55,495	29.52
Libertarian	Floyd Shackelford	2,948	1.57
Write-in		289	0.15
Total votes		187,965	100.00
Republican hold			

=== 2004 ===
2004 Alabama's 2nd congressional district election
Party	Candidate	Votes	%
Republican	Terry Everett (incumbent)	177,086	71.42
Democratic	Charles D. "Chuck" James	70,562	28.46
Write-in		299	0.12
Total votes		247,947	100.00
Republican hold			

=== 2006 ===
2006 Alabama's 2nd congressional district election
Party	Candidate	Votes	%
Republican	Terry Everett (incumbent)	124,302	69.47
Democratic	Charles D. "Chuck" James	54,450	30.43
Write-in		167	0.09
Total votes		178,919	100.00
Republican hold			

=== 2008 ===
2008 Alabama's 2nd congressional district election
Party	Candidate	Votes	%
Democratic	Bobby Bright	144,368	50.23
Republican	Jay Love	142,578	49.61
Write-in		448	0.16
Total votes		287,394	100.00
Democratic gain from Republican			

=== 2010 ===
2010 Alabama's 2nd congressional district election
Party	Candidate	Votes	%
Republican	Martha Roby	111,645	50.97
Democratic	Bobby Bright (incumbent)	106,865	48.79
Write-in		518	0.24
Total votes		219,028	100.00
Republican gain from Democratic			

=== 2012 ===
2012 Alabama's 2nd congressional district election
Party	Candidate	Votes	%
Republican	Martha Roby (incumbent)	180,591	63.60
Democratic	Therese Ford	103,092	36.31
Write-in		270	0.10
Total votes		283,953	100.00
Republican hold			

=== 2014 ===
2014 Alabama's 2nd congressional district election
Party	Candidate	Votes	%
Republican	Martha Roby (incumbent)	113,103	67.34
Democratic	Erick Wright	54,692	32.56
Write-in		157	0.09
Total votes		167,952	100.00
Republican hold			

=== 2016 ===
2016 Alabama's 2nd congressional district election
Party	Candidate	Votes	%
Republican	Martha Roby (incumbent)	134,886	48.75
Democratic	Nathan Mathis	112,089	40.51
Write-in		29,709	10.74
Total votes		276,684	100.00
Republican hold			

=== 2018 ===
2018 Alabama's 2nd congressional district election
Party	Candidate	Votes	%
Republican	Martha Roby (incumbent)	138,879	61.39
Democratic	Tabitha Isner	86,931	38.43
Write-in		420	0.19
Total votes		226,230	100.00
Republican hold			

=== 2020 ===
2020 Alabama's 2nd congressional district election
Party	Candidate	Votes	%
Republican	Barry Moore	197,996	65.22
Democratic	Phyllis Harvey-Hall	105,286	34.68
Write-in		287	0.10
Total votes		303,569	100.00
Republican hold			

=== 2022 ===
2022 Alabama's 2nd congressional district election
Party	Candidate	Votes	%
Republican	Barry Moore (incumbent)	137,460	69.12
Democratic	Phyllis Harvey-Hall	58,014	29.17
Libertarian	Jonathan Realz	3,396	1.71
Total votes		198,870	100.00
Republican hold			

=== 2024 ===
2024 Alabama's 2nd congressional district election
Party	Candidate	Votes	%
Democratic	Shomari Figures	157,092	54.56
Republican	Caroleene Dobson	130,847	45.44
Total votes		287,939	100.00
Democratic gain from Republican			

=== 2026 ===
2026 Alabama's 2nd congressional district election
Party	Candidate	Votes	%
Democratic	Shomari Figures	124,422	53.75
Republican	Rhett Marques	107,049	46.25
Total votes		231,471	100.00
Democratic hold			

== See also ==
- Alabama's congressional districts
- List of United States congressional districts
