= Terry Everett =

American politician (1937–2024)

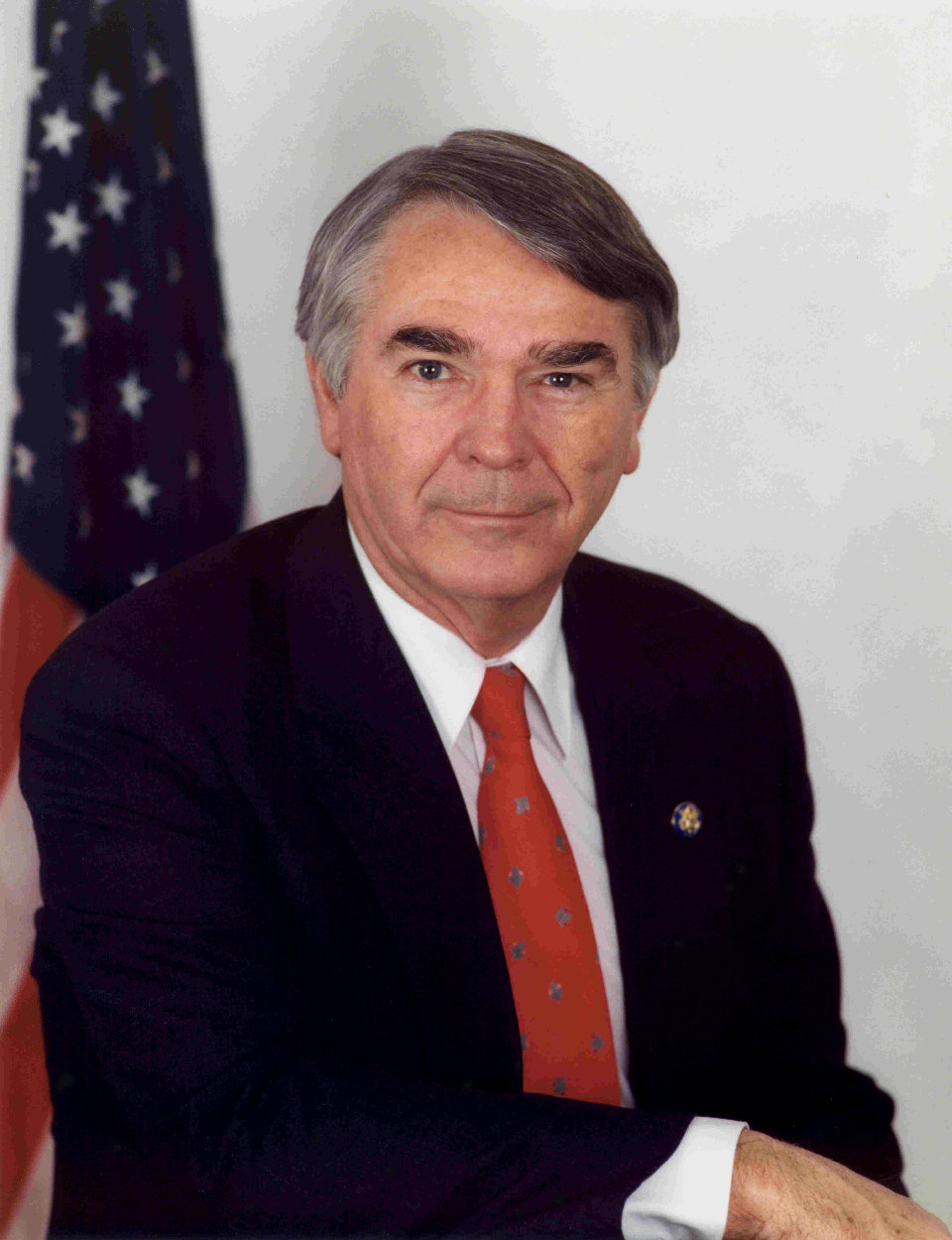

Member of the U.S. House of Representatives from Alabama's 2nd district
- In office January 3, 1993 – January 3, 2009
- Preceded by: Bill Dickinson
- Succeeded by: Bobby Bright

Personal details
- Born: February 15, 1937 Dothan, Alabama, U.S.
- Died: March 12, 2024 (aged 87) Rehobeth, Alabama, U.S.
- Party: Republican
- Spouse: Barbara Pitts Everett
- Education: Enterprise State Junior College
- Occupation: Journalist; Real estate executive

Military service
- Branch/service: United States Air Force
- Years of service: 1955–1959

Robert Terry Everett (February 15, 1937 – March 12, 2024) was an American politician and a Republican member of the United States House of Representatives from Alabama's 2nd congressional district. He served from 1993 to his retirement in 2009.

On September 26, 2007, Everett announced his intention to retire at the end of the 110th Congress after the 2008 elections. He was succeeded by Bobby Bright, the first Democrat to represent the district since William Louis Dickinson won it during the Barry Goldwater landslide in Alabama in 1964.

== Early life ==
Everett was born on February 15, 1937, in Dothan, Alabama, the son of Bob and Thelma Everett. He lived and attended school in Midland City, Alabama. Upon graduation from high school in 1955, Everett joined the U.S. Air Force and was assigned to the U.S. Air Force Security Service's 6901st Special Communication Group as an intelligence analyst from 1955 to 1959. He served as analyst for reconnaissance aircraft flights including the Lockheed U-2 which, as a congressman, he protected from defunding.

== Journalism career ==
Everett began a career in journalism after leaving the Air Force. He began as a reporter for the Dothan Eagle then became publisher and editor of the Graceville News and the Hartford News Herald. In 1966, Everett started weekly newspapers Down Home Today in Dothan and Daleville Today in Daleville. Everett expanded his weeklies to include The Enterpriser and The Army Flier at Fort Rucker (now Fort Novosel). He later expanded into publishing dailies with The Daily Ledger in Enterprise and The Aurora Advertiser in Aurora, Missouri. In 1983, his business reached its peak when he founded Gulf Coast Media, and he became owner-publisher of the Baldwin Times, Robertsdale Independent, Fairhope Courier, Foley Onlooker, Gulf Shores Islander, Spanish Fort Bulletin, and the Union Springs Herald.

Everett sold all of his newspaper holdings except the Union Springs Herald in 1988. Later, he owned and operated Premium Homebuilders, a residential construction company in Enterprise. By the late 1980s, Everett had become a prominent businessman and community leader in the Wiregrass. He established Everett Land Development and served as president and chairman of the board of the Alabama Press Association, chairman of the board for Dothan Federal Savings Bank, president of the Daleville Chamber of Commerce, and member of the Environment Protection Commission for the Southeastern Region of the United States. He sold the Union Springs Herald in 2003.

== U.S. House ==
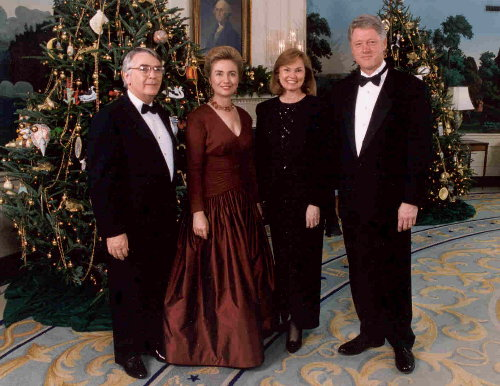
Everett with President Bill Clinton in 1994

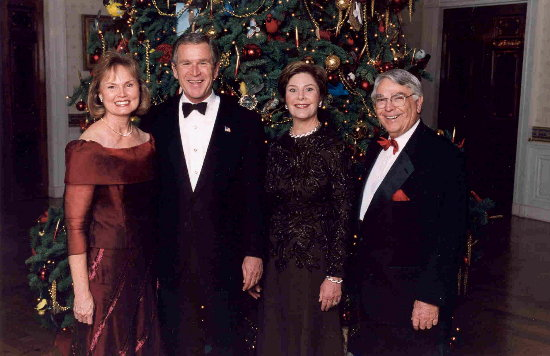
Everett with President George W. Bush in 2004

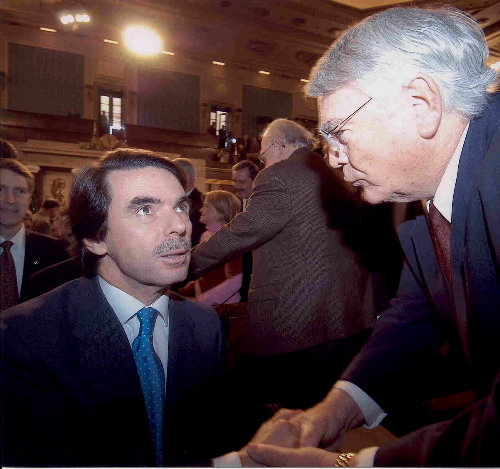
Everett with Prime Minister of Spain José María Aznar in 2004

=== Elections ===
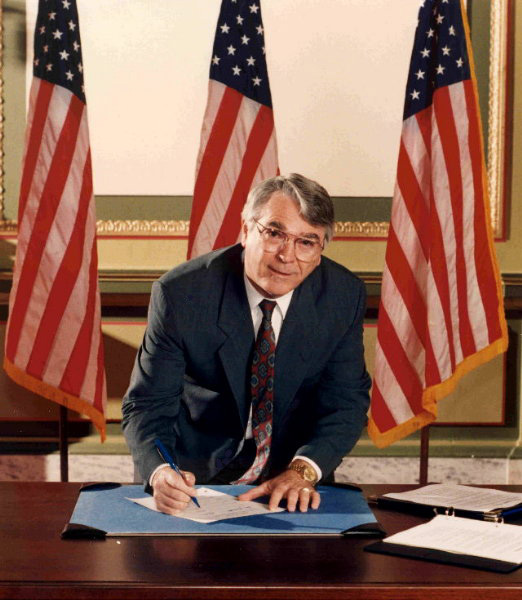
Everett signing the Contract with America in 1994

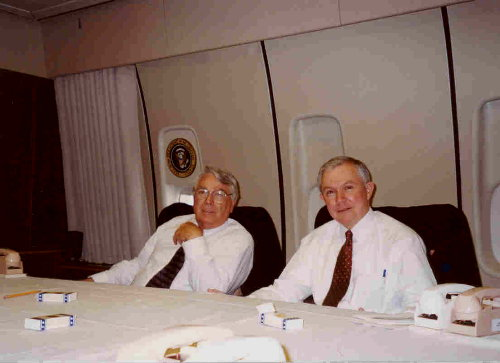
Everett with Jeff Sessions in 2002

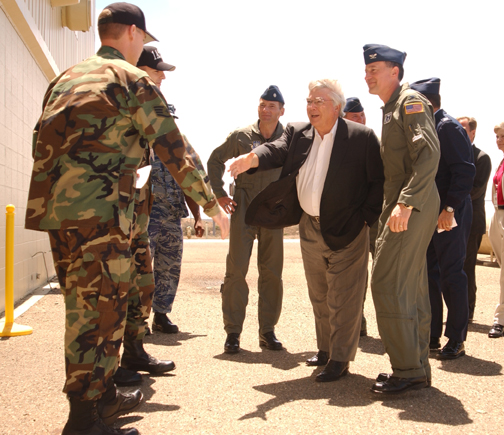
Terry Everett visiting Vandenberg Air Force Base in 2006

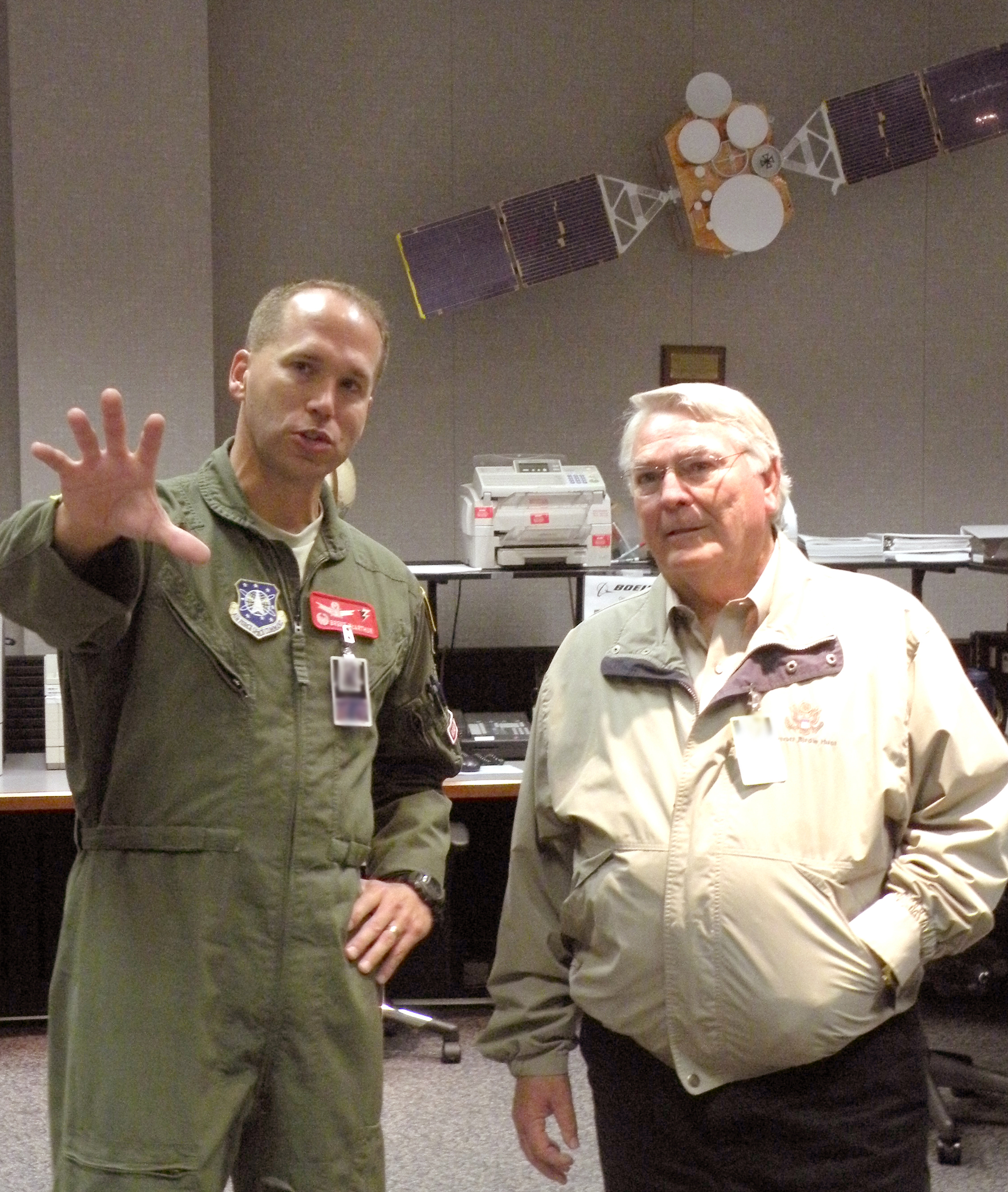
Everett visits Schriever Air Force Base in 2008

In 1992, Bill Dickinson announced his retirement from Congress, having served the 2nd District since 1964. It was widely expected that the race to succeed him would be between Democratic State Treasurer George Wallace, Jr., the son of the former governor, and Republican State Senator Larry Dixon from Montgomery. However, Everett upset Dixon in the Republican primary, winning by 15 points largely by dominating the area of the district outside Montgomery. In November, Everett defeated Wallace by just under two points (3,500 votes). Everett was likely helped by redistricting changes that moved many of the district's African American residents, particularly in Montgomery and Selma, to the 7th District to create a minority-majority district. Previously, Dickinson had only won a 14th term in 1990 by only two points. The district reverted to form in the 1994 Republican wave, and Everett was reelected with 73 percent of the vote. He was reelected six more times after that with no substantive opposition.

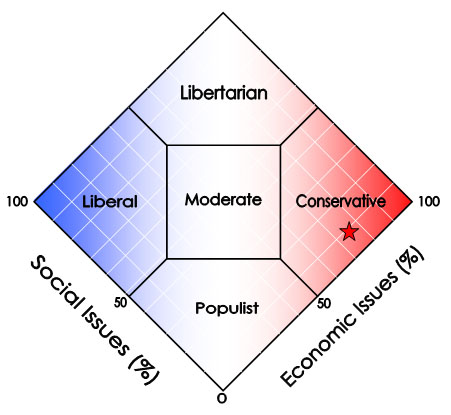
Terry Everett's political orientation based on voting record

=== Tenure ===
Like his predecessor Dickinson, Everett was one of the most conservative members of the House. He had the highest lifetime rating from the American Conservative Union of any member of the Alabama delegation. He showed a concern about local issues and demonstrated a real impact on some issues that are vital to his constituency. In 1995, he formed a Peanut Caucus and on the Agriculture Committee pushed for reform of the peanut program as part of the Freedom to Farm Act (which included a 10 percent cut in the support price).

During the 2002 Farm bill, Everett chaired the Specialty Crops and Foreign Agriculture Programs Subcommittee, which placed him in a strong position to advocate the interests of peanut farmers. When the 30 percent peanut subsidy finally lost congressional support, he managed to secure passage of a $3.5 billion program to buy back quota owned by peanut farmers, similar to reforms to the dairy program.

Everett also worked on military and veterans' issues (the 2nd District includes Fort Novosel and Maxwell-Gunter Air Force Base). As a Veterans' Affairs subcommittee chairman in 1999, he helped secure a $1.7 billion increase for veterans' health care spending and the opening of four new national cemeteries.

As chair of the Veterans' Affairs subcommittee on Oversight and Investigations, Everett garnered national attention in the fall of 1997 for revealing that former Ambassador M. Larry Lawrence had improperly secured a burial waiver at Arlington National Cemetery. After checking a list of political donors who had received Arlington burial waivers from the Bill Clinton White House, Everett's investigation found that Lawrence had lied about his military record to qualify for the waiver. The New York Times reported on December 17, 1997: "On that note, it looked as though the mini-scandal would end as an oratorical draw, or even a Republican setback. But the Republicans reacted to White House anger by digging into Mr. Lawrence's background. In early December, a House panel headed by Everett discovered that there was no record that Mr. Lawrence was aboard the ship Horace Bushnell, as he and the White House had claimed. That discovery revived Republican accusations that perhaps the Administration had granted a favor to a wealthy donor after all. But for once a politician warned against instant judgment. I urge everyone to avoid hasty conclusions, Mr. Everett said."

The New York Times reported on December 12, 1997: "Mr. Lawrence probably would have stayed at Arlington forever if it were not for a group of Congressional Republicans led by Representative Terry Everett of Alabama, who last summer began investigating whether the Clinton White House had sold burial plots to generous campaign contributors."

In 1998, Congressman Everett received the "Excellence in Programmatic Oversight Award" from the House Republican Leadership for his Veterans' Affairs Subcommittee probe into improper burial waivers at Arlington National Cemetery.

In 2005 Everett became the first chairman of the House Armed Services Subcommittee on Strategic Forces, which was created to place national strategic assets – nuclear weapons, intelligence, satellites and missile defense systems – under one authorizing Subcommittee with an annual budget of fifty billion dollars. He focused on improving space acquisition and procurement programs and beginning a national debate on space protection. Everett spearheaded key legislative initiatives in national security space, including development of a space protection strategy, management of the space cadre and space acquisition personnel, and establishment of the Operationally Responsive Space Office.

His tenure as chairman of this subcommittee mirrored his interests, focus, and method of operation, particularly as national security issues took prominence in the last four years of his terms. Everett held frequent hearings and classified briefings on space control, threats, acquisition and procurement challenges, space cadre, and space policy.

Projects and concepts that he promoted included missile defense systems; improved global position systems (GPS); intelligence collection systems; nuclear security policy; Cobra Judy AN/SPQ-11, a ship-based ballistic missile and space-tracking radar; Transformational Satellite Communications System (TSAT); the Reliable Replacement Warhead (RRW) to replace aging and expensive-to-maintain Cold War-era nuclear weapons; the Robust Nuclear Earth Penetrator (RNEP), an effort to reach deeply buried fortified missile launch sites; and the National Space Studies Center. Congress did not enact TSAT, RRW, or RNEP legislation.

Reflecting back to his service with the USAFSS Everett was particularly interested in maintaining the nation's superiority in high-altitude reconnaissance. When the Air Force attempted to replace the U-2 reconnaissance aircraft with the Northrop Grumman RQ-4 Global Hawk in 2005, Everett inserted language in both the House Defense authorization bill and the House Select Intelligence Panel authorization bill which prohibited the Air Force from retiring the U-2 aircraft unless the Secretary of Defense certified there would be no loss of Intelligence, Surveillance, and Reconnaissance (ISR) capabilities. This legislation proved prescient as the Global Hawk experienced development challenges and schedule delays, and the Air Force realized it needed to continue relying on the U-2 to support its worldwide intelligence needs. When Republicans on the House Intelligence Panel attempted to defund the classified spacecraft Boeing X-37 program, Everett led the panel's Democratic members and two of his fellow Republicans to kill the defunding amendment. He also defeated a Republican amendment to halt funding for Cobra Judy in the Intelligence Committee.

In October 2006, the Missile Defense Advocacy Alliance honored Congressman Everett for his support of missile defense overall and for funding research and development of the Terminal High Altitude Area Defense (THAAD) missile system. In September 2008, the National Nuclear Security Administration (NNSA) presented him its Gold Medal for his support of Nuclear Security.

Everett's retirement was brief. Within weeks after he left Congress, he was invited to the White House to discuss the Schriever V Space War Games with members of the United States National Security Council, Air Force Space Command and the intelligence community. Subsequently, Everett became the first active or retired member of Congress to participate in an Air Force space war game, and was appointed to the role of President of the United States (POTUS). Over five hundred experts from the United States, Britain, Canada, and Australia were involved in the different working cells, each of which used a "whole of government" approach to strategize about how to posture against possible attacks on America's space systems. Everett's role as POTUS was to rule on final decisions made in the executive cell.

Following Schriever V, Everett was appointed as one of the four senior advisors to the Air Force Space Command's Space Protection Program in Colorado Springs, Colorado. Then in 2011, Secretary of State Hillary Clinton appointed him to the Department of State's International Security Advisory Board (ISAB) where he was a member of the Pakistan/South Asia study group. When Secretary Clinton resigned in 2013, Everett resigned from ISAB, but newly appointed Secretary of State John Kerry "respectfully declined" Everett's resignation. Kerry urged Everett to continue serving as a member of the Board working on "some of our most important diplomatic and international security challenges".

In 2006, he voted against extending the Voting Rights Act of 1965 because of the House's failure to adopt an amendment that would have based the law on current data. Everett's opposition to the VRA extension was detailed in YellowhammerPolitics.com:

"I am disappointed that the House chose not to update the 1965 Voting Rights Act when it reauthorized the measure," Everett argued. "The whole debate was cast as either you're for the Voting Rights Act or you're not. There was no attention paid to the fact that the Act's formulas are out of date and place the Act itself at risk of constitutional challenge. As a result, states like Alabama continue to be punished for wrongs committed 40 years ago and the same criteria will remain in effect for another 25 years, through 2032. The Voting Rights Act remains locked in a time-warp reflecting the voting realities of 1964, not 2006. The very constitutionality of the Voting Rights Act may be in question," he added. "The Supreme Court found more than 30 years ago that the Act's formula, which is based on the 1964, 1968 and 1972 presidential election voting data, was constitutional because it was temporary and narrowly tailored to address a specific problem. Thirty years have since passed calling into question the basis of this ruling." The 1965 comments made by Everett concerning the constitutionality of the Voting Rights Act were used by the U.S. Supreme Court in 2013 when it ruled against parts of the Act.

On June 16, 2006, he voted against a resolution setting a timeline for withdrawal from Iraq.

In February 2007, Everett co-sponsored a house bill with Ron Paul of Texas to end United States membership in the United Nations.

In an October 2006 New York Times Op-ed piece, Congressional Quarterly journalist Jeff Stein revealed that despite Everett's being vice-chairperson of the House intelligence subcommittee on technical and tactical intelligence, Everett did not know the ideological and religious differences between Sunni and Shia Muslims. Stein wrote that he posed a question to Everett: "'Do you know the difference between a Sunni and a Shiite?'... Mr. Everett responded with a low chuckle. He thought for a moment: 'One's in one location, another's in another location. No, to be honest with you, I don't know. I thought it was differences in their religion, different families or something.'" After Stein explained some of those differences to the congressman, Everett responded, "Now that you've explained it to me, what occurs to me is that it makes what we're doing over there extremely difficult, not only in Iraq but that whole area."

=== Committees ===
- House Committee on Agriculture (2nd of 20)
  - Subcommittee on Conservation, Credit, Energy and Research
  - Subcommittee on Specialty Crops, Rural Development and Foreign Agriculture Programs
- House Committee on Armed Services (4th of 28)
  - Subcommittee on Strategic Forces (Ranking Member)
  - Subcommittee on Seapower and Expeditionary Forces
- Permanent Select Committee on Intelligence (2nd of 9)
  - Subcommittee on Oversight and Investigations (Ranking Member)
  - Subcommittee on Terrorism/HUMINT, Analysis and Counter Intelligence
  - Subcommittee on Technical and Tactical Intelligence

== Electoral history ==
Alabama's 2nd congressional district election, 1992
Party	Candidate	Votes	%
Republican	Terry Everett	112,906	49.5
Democratic	George Wallace Jr.	109,335	47.9
Libertarian	Glynn Reeves	3,150	1.4
Independent	Malcolm Brassell	1,426	0.6
Independent	Richard Boone	1,330	0.6
Write-in		13	0.0
Total votes		228,160	100.0
Republican hold			

Alabama's 4th congressional district election, 1994
Party	Candidate	Votes	%
Republican	Terry Everett (incumbent)	124,465	73.6
Democratic	Brian Dowling	44,694	26.4
Write-in		54	0.0
Total votes		169,213	100.0
Republican hold			

Alabama's 2nd congressional district election, 1996
Party	Candidate	Votes	%
Republican	Terry Everett (incumbent)	132,563	63.2
Democratic	Bob Gaines	74,317	35.4
Libertarian	Michael Probst	2,653	1.3
Write-in		260	0.1
Total votes		209,793	100.0
Republican hold			

Alabama's 2nd congressional district election, 1998
Party	Candidate	Votes	%
Republican	Terry Everett (incumbent)	131,428	69.3
Democratic	Joe Fondren	58,136	30.6
Write-in		105	0.1
Total votes		189,699	100.0
Republican hold			

Alabama's 2nd congressional district election, 2000
Party	Candidate	Votes	%
Republican	Terry Everett (incumbent)	151,830	68.2
Democratic	Charles Woods	64,958	29.2
Libertarian	Wallace McGahan	4,111	1.8
Write-in		1,737	0.8
Total votes		222,636	100.0
Republican hold			

Alabama's 2nd congressional district election, 2002
Party	Candidate	Votes	%
Republican	Terry Everett (incumbent)	129,233	68.8
Democratic	Charles Woods	55,495	29.5
Libertarian	Floyd Shackelford	2,948	1.6
Write-in		289	0.2
Total votes		187,965	100.0
Republican hold			

Alabama's 2nd congressional district election, 2004
Party	Candidate	Votes	%
Republican	Terry Everett (incumbent)	177,086	71.4
Democratic	Charles Dean James	70,562	28.5
Write-in		299	0.1
Total votes		247,947	100.0
Republican hold			

Alabama's 2nd congressional district election, 2006
Party	Candidate	Votes	%
Republican	Terry Everett (incumbent)	124,302	69.5
Democratic	Charles Dean James	54,450	30.4
Write-in		167	0.1
Total votes		178,919	100.0
Republican hold			

== Group ratings (2004) ==
- National Journal
  - Economic: 25% Liberal, 74% Conservative
  - Social: 0% Liberal, 91% Conservative
  - Foreign: 25% Liberal, 68% Conservative
- Americans for Democratic Action: 0
- American Civil Liberties Union: 5
- Chamber of Commerce of the United States: 100
- Christian Coalition: 100
- American Conservative Union: 92
- National Taxpayers Union: 54
- League of Conservation Voters: 9

== Personal life and death ==
Everett and his wife, the former Barbara Pitts, made their home in Rehobeth, Alabama. The couple were Southern Baptists.

Terry Everett died at home on March 12, 2024, at the age of 87.

U.S. House of Representatives
Preceded by William L. Dickinson	Member of the U.S. House of Representatives from Alabama's 2nd congressional district January 3, 1993–January 3, 2009	Succeeded by Bobby Bright
