= Bobby Bright =

American politician (born 1952)

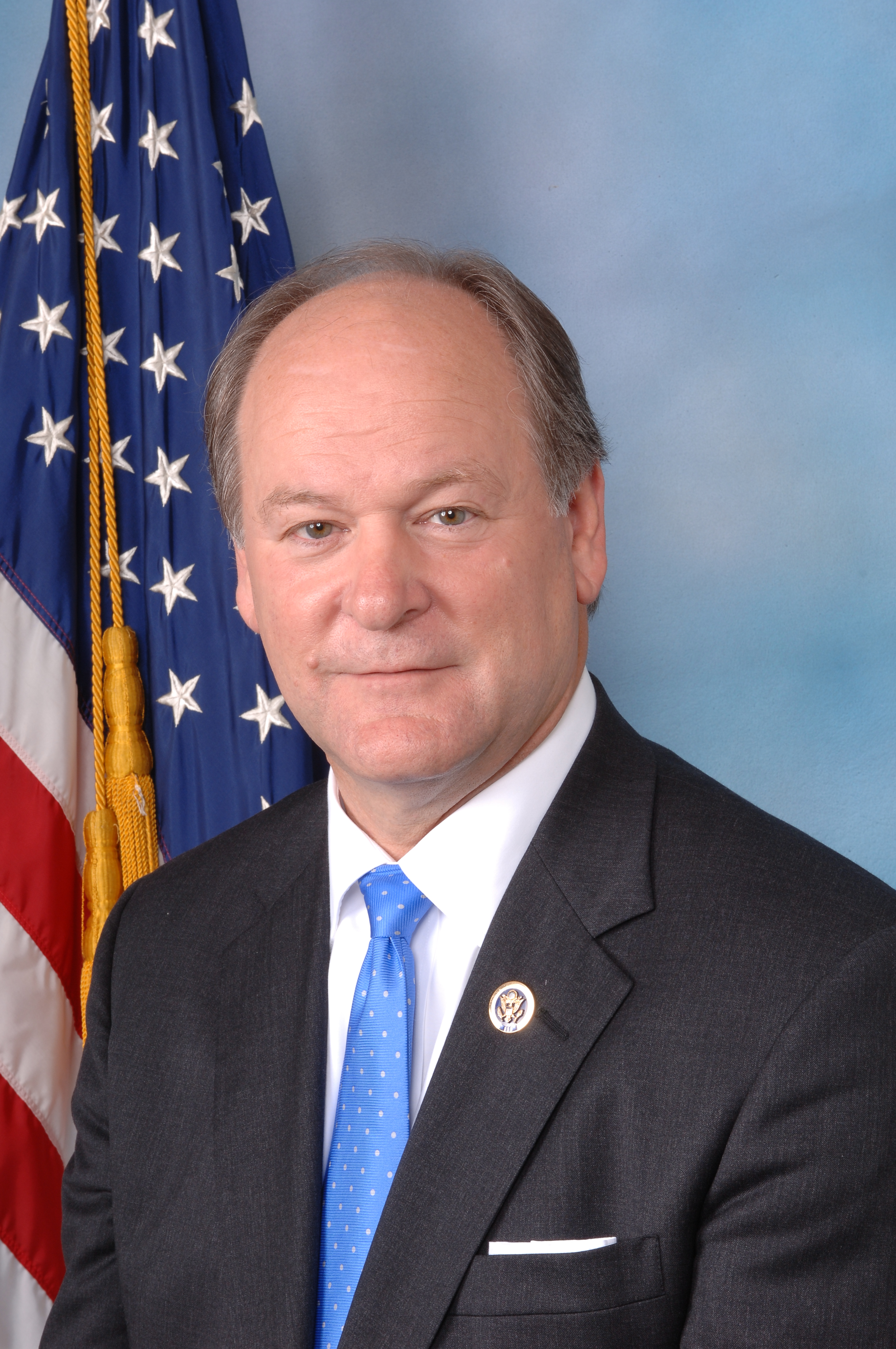

Member of the U.S. House of Representatives from Alabama's 2nd district
- In office January 3, 2009 – January 3, 2011
- Preceded by: Terry Everett
- Succeeded by: Martha Roby

55th Mayor of Montgomery
- In office November 9, 1999 – January 3, 2009
- Preceded by: Emory Folmar
- Succeeded by: Charles Jinright (acting)

Personal details
- Born: Bobby Neal Bright; July 21, 1952 (age 74) Midland City, Alabama, U.S.
- Party: Independent (before 2008); Democratic (2008–2011); Republican (2011–present)
- Spouse: Lynn Clardy
- Children: 3
- Education: Auburn University (BA); Troy University (MS); Faulkner University (JD)

Bobby Neal Bright Sr. (born July 21, 1952) is an American retired lawyer, farmer, and former politician who served as a U.S. representative and was previously the three-term mayor of Montgomery, Alabama. He served from 2009 to 2011 as the Representative from Alabama's 2nd congressional district. His 2008 campaign ran on the message of "America First", and his voting record indicated that he was the most conservative member of the House Democratic Caucus in the 111th Congress. His district includes just over half of the city of Montgomery, as well as most of the Wiregrass Region in the southeastern part of the state.

Bright is a native of the Wiregrass Region and has 13 siblings. He is the first Mayor of Montgomery to be elected to Congress. In November 2010, he was defeated for a second term in the House of Representatives by Republican nominee Martha Roby, a then-Montgomery City Council member. In 2018, Bright attempted to run for his old House seat as a Republican, but was defeated by Roby in a runoff.

== Early life, education, and early career ==
Bright was born in Midland City, Alabama, and grew up on one of the cotton farms that were typical of the Wiregrass Region. Bright grew up the son of a sharecropper, with 13 siblings. After spending his youth working on the farm and graduating from high school, he took a job in metalworking to save up money for college. Bright worked each and every day to pay for his education. He later graduated from Auburn University with a B.A. in political science in 1975 and took a job as an auditor before earning an M.S. in criminal justice from Troy State University in 1977 and beginning a career as a corrections officer. While working in the prison system, he was deeply affected by the many young people he saw entering the penitentiaries and decided to transition into law practice as a result. Bright received his Juris Doctor from the Thomas Goode Jones School of Law at Faulkner University in 1982. He practiced law for fifteen years before entering into politics.

== Mayor of Montgomery ==
Bright was first elected in 1999, defeating longtime incumbent Republican Mayor Emory Folmar. He was re-elected in a landslide against challenger Scott Simmons in 2003.

During Mayor Bright's tenure he revitalized Montgomery's downtown and riverfront including the Renaissance Montgomery complex and Montgomery Riverwalk Stadium. He helped bring new jobs to the area, and saved existing jobs. He was also named the state's "Tourism Advocate of the Year" by the Governor for his work in building that industry. On the financial side, he balanced the city's budget every year and created a $30 million rainy day fund, secured millions in federal grants for important projects, maintained the city's "AA" credit rating (best in state) by holding spending and debt in check, and saved money by implementing an international prescription drug buying program.

== U.S. House of Representatives ==
=== Elections ===
2008

Mayor Bright had never previously claimed affiliation with any party, but in 2008 he announced that he was running as a Democrat for the open seat in the 2nd District. The district's eight-term incumbent, Republican Congressman Terry Everett, was not running for reelection.

Like many Alabama Democrats, he opposed abortion and gun control. However, he favored "a strong, honorable plan" to end the Iraq War.

Bright was considered the strongest Democrat to run in a district that had been in Republican hands since 1965. With the strong support of the state and national Democratic establishment, Bright easily won the Democratic Nomination against two minor challengers. He faced Republican State Representative Jay Love in the November Election. Both Bright and Love are deacons at First Baptist Church in Montgomery. Bright received the endorsement of Republican State Senator Harri Anne Smith, whom Love had defeated by six points in the Primary.

Just before the Election, CQ Politics, The Cook Political Report and The Rothenberg Political Report rated the race a toss-up, with neither candidate a clear favorite over the other. In the November Election, Bright received 143,997 votes to Love's 142,231 votes—a margin of 1,766 votes, or just over 0.6 percentage points. While the two candidates each won eight of the district's 16 counties, Bright won the district's share of Montgomery County by 30 points. Love had the option of requesting a recount since the margin of victory was less than a point, but opted not to do so and conceded the seat to Bright. Bright's victory, and that of Parker Griffith in the 5th district, gave Alabama two white Democratic congressmen for the first time since Tom Bevill and Glen Browder both left the House in 1997. Bright represented the fourth most Republican district in the nation to be represented by a Democrat; it had a Cook Partisan Voting Index of R+16, and gave John McCain 63 percent of the vote in 2008.

The second traditionally gives its congressmen very long tenures in Washington. Bright was only the seventh person to represent it in over a century, and the fifth since 1921. Bright's 2008 campaign was endorsed by Democrats for Life of America.

2010

Bright was unopposed in the 2010 Democratic primary. Republican Montgomery city council member Martha Roby decisively beat Tea Party favorite and former Marine Rick Barber in the GOP primary. Bright ran campaign ads aimed at distancing himself from the establishment Democratic Party. In these ads, he described himself as “independent and conservative,” and emphasized his support for small business. Under fire from Roby for his support of Nancy Pelosi for Speaker of the House, Bright stated publicly that he would not vote for Pelosi for Speaker again. Roby nonetheless defeated Bright as Republicans took back control of the House.

=== Tenure ===
During his time in Congress, Bright was a member of the Blue Dog Coalition. He voted with Democratic leadership 71.7% of the time., making him the second most conservative member of the House Democratic Caucus. Bright voted twice against the American Recovery and Reinvestment Act, one of only 7 Democrats voting against the final version. In February 2009, Bright voted in favor of the Omnibus Appropriations Act, 2009. In June 2009, Bright voted in favor of the Cash for Clunkers bill. In July 2009, Bright voted against establishing spending caps through fiscal year 2014. In November 2009, Bright voted against the House version of the Affordable Health Care for America Act. In March 2010, Bright voted against the Senate version of the Affordable Health Care for America Act. He did not sign a petition circulated by Iowa Republican Steve King calling for a complete repeal of the law, calling the effort "premature".

In November 2009, Bright, along with Representative Walt Minnick of Idaho, introduced House Resolution 4072. This resolution reorganized public job training funds, directing them towards flexible skills and credentials recognized by industries. Also called the American Manufacturing Efficiency and Retraining Investment Collaboration Act (AMERICA Works), the bill was targeted at new workers just entering the workforce and servicemen and women returning to civilian life. Because of his dedication to small business, Bright requested a waiver to serve on the House Small Business Committee shortly after his arrival in Washington. The first bill sponsored by Bright would eventually be included in the American Recovery and Reinvestment Act, which became law on February 17, 2009.

After the defection of fellow Alabama Democrat Parker Griffith to the Republican Party in December 2009, political analyst and statistician Nate Silver suggested that Bright could follow, naming "60/40" odds that he would eventually join the Republican caucus as well. The day after Griffith's party switch, Bright told media that he had no intention of switching parties and would remain a Democrat.

The National Journal named Bright the most conservative Democrat during the first session of the 111th United States Congress.

In April 2009, Bright voted against the Matthew Shepard and James Byrd Jr. Hate Crimes Prevention Act.

=== Committee assignments ===
- Committee on Agriculture
  - Subcommittee on Conservation, Credit, Energy, and Research
  - Subcommittee on Specialty Crops, Rural Development and Foreign Agriculture
- Committee on Armed Services
  - Subcommittee on Readiness
  - Subcommittee on Air and Land Forces
  - Subcommittee on Terrorism and Unconventional Threats
- Committee on Small Business
  - Subcommittee on Regulations, Healthcare and Trade
  - Subcommittee on Rural and Urban Entrepreneurship

== 2018 Congressional run ==
In February 2018, Bright filed to run for his old House seat as a Republican. He said that during his one term in Congress, he had not been able to do everything he had wanted to do "because my beliefs are conservative and that held me back." He pointed out that Roby was no longer on the Agriculture and Armed Services committees despite the second district's large military presence and significant agricultural element. Bright finished second in the first round of the Republican primary with 28% of the vote, and qualified for the runoff against Roby. Roby defeated him, 68% to 32%.

== Electoral history ==
Alabama's 2nd Congressional District House Election, 2008
Party	Candidate	Votes	%	±%
Democratic	Bobby Bright	144,368	50.23%	
Republican	Jay Love	142,578	49.61%	

Alabama's 2nd Congressional District House Election, 2010
Party	Candidate	Votes	%	±%
Republican	Martha Roby	111,645	50.97%	
Democratic	Bobby Bright	106,865	48.79%	−1.44%

Republican primary results
Party	Candidate	Votes	%
Republican	Martha Roby (incumbent)	36,708	39.0
Republican	Bobby Bright	26,481	28.1
Republican	Barry Moore	18,177	19.3
Republican	Rich Hobson	7,052	7.5
Republican	Tommy Amason	5,763	6.1
Total votes		94,181	100.0

Republican primary runoff results
Party	Candidate	Votes	%
Republican	Martha Roby (incumbent)	48,331	67.9
Republican	Bobby Bright	22,795	32.1
Total votes		71,126	100.0

Political offices
Preceded by Emory Folmar	Mayor of Montgomery; 1999–2009	Succeeded by Charles Jinright; Acting
U.S. House of Representatives
Preceded by Terry Everett	Member of the U.S. House of Representatives from Alabama's 2nd congressional district 2009–2011	Succeeded by Martha Roby
U.S. order of precedence (ceremonial)
Preceded by Marie Newman as Former U.S. Representative	Order of precedence of the United States as Former U.S. Representative	Succeeded by Parker Griffith as Former U.S. Representative
