= Missile Defense Advocacy Alliance =

American missile defence lobby organization

The Missile Defense Advocacy Alliance is a non-profit organization advocating the development and deployment of missile defense for the United States and its allies. Founded in 2002, by Riki Ellison, it promotes United States Government missile defense strategies and technologies. The organization is based in Alexandria, Virginia, just outside Washington D.C.

== Activities ==
MDAA reports open source information pertaining to missile defense strategies, technologies, and tests. MDAA also advocates effective missile defense strategies to members of the United States Government. MDAA's website contains information on U.S. and allied missile defense systems, cooperative international missile defense efforts, and information on ballistic missile threats around the world for use by the public.

MDAA hosts a variety of missile defense related events around the world. It hosts an annual Missile Defender of the Year Award Ceremony in Alexandria each year, recognizing excellence among the U.S. missile defense operators from the U.S. Army, Navy, Air Force, and National Guard. The organization also holds annual Defender of the Year events with the Republic of Korea, NATO, the United Arab Emirates, Alaska, and at U.S. Northern Command/North American Aerospace Defense Command. MDAA has been operating the SHIELD program at USC since 2021. The SHIELD Executive program works with USC's Price School of Public Policy and Viterbi School of Engineering to educate senior leaders from the military, government, and innovation technological communities about the intersection of public policy and engineering. It connects theory and practical applications for national security purposes. Each 8-month cohort starts in September and finishes in April of the following year. September 2022 starts the second annual cohort of the SHIELD program's inception. The 2023 USC SHIELD cohort developing leaders in policy, space, and technology for national security.

Since 2014, MDAA hosts regular roundtable discussions on missile defense issues in the U.S. Capitol. Topics have included missile defense of the U.S. homeland, and missiles defense radars and sensors, and missile defense from a military operations perspective. These events typically feature remarks from recently retired military leaders with missile defense expertise.

== See also ==
- Astroturfing
- Militarization of space
- Strategic Defence Initiative
