= United States Congressional Joint Committee on the Library =

Legislative oversight committee for the Library of Congress

The Joint Committee on the Library is a Joint Committee of the United States Congress devoted to the affairs and administration of the Library of Congress, which is the library of the federal legislature. There are five members of each house on the committee. It has no subcommittees.

The committee was originally established in 1806 (House Journal. 1806. 9th Cong., 1st sess., 27 February.) to support the expansion of a congressional library. In 1811, the committee was officially made permanent. It is Congress's oldest continuing joint committee.

The Committee currently has oversight of the operations of the Library of Congress, as well as management of the congressional art collection, the National Statuary Hall Collection, and the United States Botanic Garden, but does not have legislative authority.

The committee is authorized to accept any work of the fine arts on behalf of Congress and designate a location in the United States Capitol for the work of art (pursuant to the Revised Statutes). This authority was expanded in 1875 to require that artwork that was not the property of the United States could not be displayed in the Capitol and that rooms in the Capitol cannot be used as private studios for works of art without written permission of the Committee. The Architect of the Capitol has the authority to enforce this provision.

On February 24, 1933, with the passage of House Concurrent Resolution No. 47, the Architect of the Capitol was authorized and directed to relocate within the Capitol any of the statues already received and placed in Statuary Hall, upon the approval of the Joint Committee on the Library, and to provide for the reception and location of statues received from the states. This provision was permanently enacted into law in 2000 in the legislative branch appropriations.

Membership consists of the chair and four Members of the Senate Committee on Rules and Administration, chair and three Members of the Committee on House Administration and chair (or his designee) of the House Appropriations Subcommittee on the Legislative Branch. The chair of the Committee alternates between the House and Senate every two years, at the start of a new Congress.

== Committee leadership ==
A list of former chairs/vice chairs and ranking members/vice ranking member since 1947 are below.

=== Chairs ===
Name	Party	State	Start	End	Chamber
Wayland Brooks	Republican	IL	1947	1949	Senate
Mary Norton	Democratic	NJ	1949	1951	House
Theodore Green	Democratic	RI	1951	1953	Senate
Karl LeCompte	Republican	IL	1953	1955	House
Omar Burleson	Democratic	TX	1955	1956	House
Theodore Green	Democratic	RI	1956	1957	Senate
Omar Burleson	Democratic	TX	1957	1958	House
Theodore Green	Democratic	RI	1958	1960	Senate
Omar Burleson	Democratic	TX	1960	1964	House
Everett Jordan	Democratic	NC	1964	1965	Senate
Omar Burleson	Democratic	TX	1965	1966	House
Everett Jordan	Democratic	NC	1966	1967	Senate
Omar Burleson	Democratic	TX	1967	1968	House
Everett Jordan	Democratic	NC	1968	1969	Senate
Samuel Friedel	Democratic	MD	1969	1970	House
Everett Jordan	Democratic	NC	1970	1971	Senate
Wayne Hays	Democratic	OH	1971	1972	House
Everett Jordan	Democratic	NC	1972	1973	Senate
Lucien Nedzi	Democratic	MI	1973	1974	House
Howard Cannon	Democratic	NV	1974	1975	Senate
Lucien Nedzi	Democratic	MI	1975	1976	House
Howard Cannon	Democratic	NV	1976	1977	Senate
Lucien Nedzi	Democratic	MI	1977	1979	House
Clay Pell	Democratic	RI	1979	1981	Senate
Augustus Hawkins	Democratic	CA	1981	1983	House
Mac Mathias	Republican	MD	1983	1985	Senate
Frank Annunzio	Democratic	IL	1985	1987	House
Clay Pell	Democratic	RI	1987	1989	Senate
Frank Annunzio	Democratic	IL	1989	1991	House
Clay Pell	Democratic	RI	1991	1993	Senate
Charlie Rose	Democratic	NC	1993	1995	House
Mark Hatfield	Republican	OR	1995	1997	Senate
Bill Thomas	Republican	CA	1997	1999	House
Ted Stevens	Republican	AK	1999	2001	Senate
Vern Ehlers	Republican	MI	2001	2003	House
Ted Stevens	Republican	AK	2003	2005	Senate
Vern Ehlers	Republican	MI	2005	2007	House
Dianne Feinstein	Democratic	CA	2007	2009	Senate
Bob Brady	Democratic	PA	2009	2011	House
Chuck Schumer	Democratic	NY	2011	2013	Senate
Gregg Harper	Republican	MS	2013	2015	House
Roy Blunt	Republican	MO	2015	2017	Senate
Gregg Harper	Republican	MS	2017	2019	House
Roy Blunt	Republican	MO	2019	2021	Senate
Zoe Lofgren	Democratic	CA	2021	2023	House
Amy Klobuchar	Democratic	MN	2023	2025	Senate
Bryan Steil	Republican	WI	2025	present	House

=== Vice Chairs ===
Name	Party	State	Start	End	Chamber
Karl LeCompte	Republican	IL	1947	1949	House
Theodore Green	Democratic	RI	1949	1951	Senate
Thomas Stanley	Democratic	VA	1951	1953	House
William Purtell	Republican	CT	1953	1954	Senate
William Jenner	Republican	IN	1954	1955	Senate
Theodore Green	Democratic	RI	1955	1956	Senate
Omar Burleson	Democratic	TX	1956	1957	Senate
Theodore Green	Democratic	RI	1957	1958	Senate
Omar Burleson	Democratic	TX	1958	1960	House
Theodore Green	Democratic	RI	1960	1961	Senate
Mike Mansfield	Democratic	MT	1961	1963	Senate
Everett Jordan	Democratic	NC	1963	1964	Senate
Omar Burleson	Democratic	TX	1964	1965	House
Everett Jordan	Democratic	NC	1965	1966	Senate
Omar Burleson	Democratic	TX	1966	1967	House
Everett Jordan	Democratic	NC	1967	1968	Senate
Omar Burleson	Democratic	TX	1968		House
Paul Jones	Democratic	MO	1968	1969	House
Everett Jordan	Democratic	NC	1969	1970	Senate
Samuel Friedel	Democratic	MD	1970	1971	House
Everett Jordan	Democratic	NC	1971	1972	Senate
Wayne Hays	Democratic	OH	1972	1973	House
Howard Cannon	Democratic	NV	1973	1974	Senate
Lucien Nedzi	Democratic	MI	1974	1975	House
Howard Cannon	Democratic	NV	1975	1976	Senate
Lucien Nedzi	Democratic	MI	1976	1977	House
Howard Cannon	Democratic	NV	1977	1979	Senate
Lucien Nedzi	Democratic	MI	1979	1981	House
Mac Mathias	Republican	MD	1981	1983	Senate
Augustus Hawkins	Democratic	CA	1983	1984	House
Al Swift	Democratic	WA	1984	1985	House
Mac Mathias	Republican	MD	1985	1987	Senate
Frank Annunzio	Democratic	IL	1987	1989	House
Clay Pell	Democratic	RI	1989	1991	Senate
Charlie Rose	Democratic	NC	1991	1993	House
Clay Pell	Democratic	RI	1993	1995	Senate
Bill Thomas	Republican	CA	1995	1997	House
Ted Stevens	Republican	AK	1997	1999	Senate
Bill Thomas	Republican	CA	1999	2001	House
Ted Stevens	Republican	AK	2001		Senate
Chris Dodd	Democratic	CT	2001	2003	Senate
Vern Ehlers	Republican	MI	2003	2005	House
Ted Stevens	Republican	AK	2005	2007	Senate
Juanita Millender-McDonald	Democratic	CA	2007		House
Bob Brady	Democratic	PA	2007	2009	House
Chuck Schumer	Democratic	NY	2009	2011	Senate
Gregg Harper	Republican	MS	2011	2013	House
Chuck Schumer	Democratic	NY	2013	2015	Senate
Gregg Harper	Republican	MS	2015	2017	House
Dick Shelby	Republican	AL	2017	2018	Senate
Roy Blunt	Republican	MO	2018	2019	Senate
Zoe Lofgren	Democratic	CA	2019	2021	House
Amy Klobuchar	Democratic	MN	2021	2023	Senate
Bryan Steil	Republican	WI	2023	2025	House
Mitch McConnell	Republican	KY	2025	present	Senate

=== Ranking Members ===
Name	Party	State	Start	End	Chamber
Mary Norton	Democratic	NJ	1947	1949	House
Irving Ives	Republican	NY	1949	1950	Senate
Henry Lodge	Republican	MA	1950	1951	Senate
Karl LeCompte	Republican	IL	1951	1953	House
Theodore Green	Democratic	RI	1953	1955	Senate
Frank Barrett	Republican	WY	1955	1956	Senate
Karl LeCompte	Republican	IL	1956	1957	House
Carl Curtis	Republican	NE	1957	1958	Senate
Karl LeCompte	Republican	IL	1958	1959	House
Paul Schenck	Republican	OH	1959	1960	House
Thruston Morton	Republican	KY	1960		Senate
Kenneth Keating	Republican	NY	1960	1962	Senate
Everett Dirksen	Republican	IL	1962	1963	Senate
John Cooper	Republican	KY	1963	1964	Senate
Paul Schenck	Republican	OH	1964	1965	House
John Cooper	Republican	KY	1965	1966	Senate
Glenard Lipscomb	Republican	CA	1966	1967	House
John Cooper	Republican	KY	1967	1968	Senate
Glenard Lipscomb	Republican	CA	1968	1969	House
John Cooper	Republican	KY	1969	1970	Senate
Fred Schwengel	Republican	IA	1970	1971	House
John Cooper	Republican	KY	1971	1972	Senate
Fred Schwengel	Republican	IA	1972	1973	House
Marlow Cook	Republican	KY	1973	1974	Senate
Samuel Devine	Republican	OH	1974	1975	House
Mark Hatfield	Republican	OR	1975	1976	Senate
Samuel Devine	Republican	OH	1976	1977	House
Robert Griffin	Republican	MI	1977	1979	Senate
Samuel Devine	Republican	OH	1979		House
David Stockman	Republican	MI	1979	1981	House
Clay Pell	Democratic	RI	1981	1983	Senate
Newt Gingrich	Republican	GA	1983	1985	House
Dan Inouye	Democratic	HI	1985	1987	Senate
Newt Gingrich	Republican	GA	1987	1989	House
Mark Hatfield	Republican	OR	1989	1991	Senate
Bill Barrett	Republican	NE	1991	1993	House
???	Republican		1993	1995	Senate
???	Democratic		1995	1997	House
Dan Moynihan	Democratic	NY	1997	1999	Senate
Steny Hoyer	Democratic	MD	1999	2001	House
Chris Dodd	Democratic	CT	2001		Senate
Ted Stevens	Republican	AK	2001	2003	Senate
John Larson	Democratic	CT	2003	2005	House
Chris Dodd	Democratic	CT	2005	2007	Senate
Vern Ehlers	Republican	MI	2007	2009	House
Bob Bennett	Republican	UT	2009	2011	Senate
Zoe Lofgren	Democratic	CA	2011	2013	House
Pat Roberts	Republican	KS	2013	2015	Senate
Bob Brady	Democratic	PA	2015	2017	House
Amy Klobuchar	Democratic	MN	2017	2019	Senate
Rodney Davis	Republican	IL	2019	2021	House
Roy Blunt	Republican	MO	2021	2023	Senate
Joe Morelle	Democratic	NY	2023	2025	House
Alex Padilla	Democratic	CA	2025	present	Senate

=== Vice Ranking Members ===
Name	Party	State	Start	End	Chamber
Theodore Green	Democratic	RI	1947	1949	Senate
Karl LeCompte	Republican	IL	1949	1951	House
Henry Lodge	Republican	MA	1951	1953	Senate
Kenneth Regan	Democratic	TX	1953	1955	House
Karl LeCompte	Republican	IL	1955	1956	House
Frank Barrett	Republican	WY	1956	1957	Senate
Karl LeCompte	Republican	IL	1957	1958	House
Carl Curtis	Republican	NE	1958	1959	Senate
Thruston Morton	Republican	KY	1959	1960	Senate
Paul Schenck	Republican	OH	1960	1964	House
John Cooper	Republican	KY	1964	1965	Senate
Glenard Lipscomb	Republican	CA	1965	1966	House
John Cooper	Republican	KY	1966	1967	Senate
Glenard Lipscomb	Republican	CA	1967	1968	House
John Cooper	Republican	KY	1968	1969	Senate
Robert Corbett	Republican	PA	1969		House
Fred Schwengel	Republican	IA	1969	1970	House
John Cooper	Republican	KY	1970	1971	Senate
Fred Schwengel	Republican	IA	1971	1972	House
John Cooper	Republican	KY	1972	1973	Senate
James Harvey	Republican	MI	1973		House
Samuel Devine	Republican	OH	1973	1974	House
Marlow Cook	Republican	KY	1974		Senate
Samuel Devine	Republican	OH	1975	1976	House
Mark Hatfield	Republican	OR	1976	1977	Senate
Samuel Devine	Republican	OH	1977	1979	House
Howard Baker	Republican	TN	1979	1981	Senate
Newt Gingrich	Republican	GA	1981	1983	House
Dan Inouye	Democratic	HI	1983	1985	Senate
Newt Gingrich	Republican	GA	1985	1987	House
Mark Hatfield	Republican	OR	1987	1989	Senate
Paul Gillmor	Republican	OH	1989	1991	House
Mark Hatfield	Republican	OR	1991	1993	Senate
???	Republican		1993	1995	House
???	Democratic		1995	1997	Senate
Carolyn Kilpatrick	Democratic	MI	1997	1999	House
Chris Dodd	Democratic	CT	1999	2001	Senate
Steny Hoyer	Democratic	MD	2001	2003	House
Chris Dodd	Democratic	CT	2003	2005	Senate
Juanita Millender-McDonald	Democratic	CA	2005	2007	House
Bob Bennett	Republican	UT	2007	2009	Senate
Gregg Harper	Republican	MS	2009	2011	House
Lamar Alexander	Republican	TN	2011	2013	Senate
Bob Brady	Democratic	PA	2013	2015	House
Chuck Schumer	Democratic	NY	2015	2017	Senate
Bob Brady	Democratic	PA	2017	2019	House
Amy Klobuchar	Democratic	MN	2019	2021	Senate
Rodney Davis	Republican	IL	2021	2023	House
Deb Fischer	Republican	NE	2023	2025	Senate
Joe Morelle	Democratic	NY	2025	present	House

== 118th Congress ==
The following members currently serve on the Joint Committee on the Library for the 118th United States Congress.

=== Members ===
Members, 118th Congress
	Majority	Minority
Senate members	Amy Klobuchar, Minnesota, Vice Chair; Mark Warner, Virginia; Jon Ossoff, Georgia	Deb Fischer, Nebraska; Cindy Hyde-Smith, Mississippi
House members	Bryan Steil, Wisconsin, Chair; Mike Carey, Ohio; Mark Amodei, Nevada	Joe Morelle, New York; Terri Sewell, Alabama

== 117th Congress ==
The 117th United States Congress served from January 3, 2021, to January 3, 2023.

=== Members ===
Members, 117th Congress
	Majority	Minority
Senate members	Amy Klobuchar, Minnesota, Vice Chair; Patrick Leahy, Vermont; Mark Warner, Virginia	Roy Blunt, Missouri, Ranking Member; Richard Shelby, Alabama
House members	Zoe Lofgren, California, Chair; Tim Ryan, Ohio; G. K. Butterfield, North Carolina	Rodney Davis, Illinois, Vice Ranking Member; Barry Loudermilk, Georgia

== 116th Congress ==
The 116th United States Congress served from January 3, 2019, to January 3, 2021.

=== Members ===
The following members served on the Joint Committee on the Library for the 116th United States Congress.

Members, 116th Congress
	Majority	Minority
Senate members	Roy Blunt, Missouri, Chair; Pat Roberts, Kansas; Richard Shelby, Alabama	Amy Klobuchar, Minnesota, Vice Ranking Member; Patrick Leahy, Vermont
House members	Zoe Lofgren, California, Vice Chair; Tim Ryan, Ohio; G. K. Butterfield, North Carolina	Rodney Davis, Illinois, Ranking Member; Barry Loudermilk, Georgia

== 115th Congress ==
The 115th United States Congress served from January 3, 2017, to January 3, 2019.

=== Members ===
The following members served on the Joint Committee on the Library for the 115th United States Congress.

Members, 115th Congress
	Majority	Minority
Senate members	Richard Shelby (R-AL), Vice Chair; Pat Roberts (R-KS); Roy Blunt (R-MO)	Amy Klobuchar (D-MN); Patrick Leahy (D-VT)
House members	Gregg Harper (R-MS), Chair; Kevin Yoder (R-KS); Barry Loudermilk (R-GA)	Bob Brady (D-PA); Zoe Lofgren (D-CA)

=== Fine arts introduced ===
The following resolutions were introduced for displaying fine arts in the United States Capitol during the 115th United States Congress.

- Lads of Pest statue provided by Hungary to commemorate the heroes of the Hungarian Revolution of 1956 on the occasion of the Revolution's 60th anniversary (introduced in the House on 01/05/2017)
- Statue depicting Harriet Tubman provided by the Harriet Tubman Statue Commission of the State of Maryland (introduced in the Senate on 02/15/2017)
- Statue or bust depicting Elie Wiesel (introduced in the House on 04/28/2017)
- Statue depicting Pierre Charles L'Enfant provided by the District of Columbia (introduced in the House on 07/12/2017)

== 114th Congress ==
The 114th United States Congress served from January 3, 2015, to January 3, 2017.

=== Members ===
The following members served on the Joint Committee on the Library for the 114th United States Congress.

Members, 114th Congress
	Majority	Minority
Senate members	Roy Blunt (R-MO), Chair; Shelley Moore Capito (R-WV); Pat Roberts (R-KS)	Chuck Schumer (D-NY); Patrick Leahy (D-VT)
House members	Gregg Harper (R-MS), Vice Chair; Candice Miller (R-MI); Tom Graves (R-GA)	Bob Brady (D-PA); Zoe Lofgren (D-CA)

=== Fine arts introduced ===
The following resolutions were introduced for displaying fine arts in the United States Capitol during the 114th United States Congress.

- Statue depicting Pierre Charles L'Enfant provided by the District of Columbia (introduced in the House on 06/18/2015 – no further action taken)
- Statue depicting Harriet Tubman provided by the Harriet Tubman Statue Commission of the State of Maryland (introduced in the House on 03/17/2016 – no further action taken)
- Statue or bust depicting Elie Wiesel (introduced in the House on 07/08/2016 – no further action taken)
- Lads of Pest statue provided by Hungary to commemorate the heroes of the Hungarian Revolution of 1956 on the occasion of the Revolution's 60th anniversary (introduced in the House on 09/15/2016 – no further action taken)

== 113th Congress ==
The 113th United States Congress served from January 3, 2013, to January 3, 2015.

=== Members ===
The following members served on the Joint Committee on the Library for the 113th United States Congress.

Members, 113th Congress
	Majority	Minority
Senate members	Chuck Schumer (D-NY), Vice Chair; Dick Durbin (D-IL); Patrick Leahy (D-VT)	Pat Roberts (R-KS); Roy Blunt (R-MO)
House members	Gregg Harper (R-MS), Chair; Candice Miller (R-MI); Tom Cole (R-OK)	Bob Brady (D-PA); Zoe Lofgren (D-CA)

=== Fine arts introduced ===
The following resolutions were introduced for displaying fine arts in the United States Capitol during the 113th United States Congress.

- Statue depicting Pierre Charles L'Enfant provided by the District of Columbia (introduced in the House on 03/27/2014 – no further action taken)
