= United States Congressional Joint Committee on Printing =

Publishing committee of U.S. Congress

The Joint Committee on Printing is a joint committee of the United States Congress devoted to overseeing the functions of the Government Publishing Office and general printing procedures of the federal government of the United States. The authority vested in the Committee is derived from 44 U.S.C. § 101 and the Committee is thereby responsible for ensuring compliance by federal entities to these laws and the Government Printing and Binding Regulations. The current joint committee was created by the Legislative Reorganization Act of 1946 and combined the functions of the United States House Committee on Printing and the United States Senate Committee on Printing.

The Committee traces its lineage back to a similar one created by an act of August 3, 1846 (9 Stat. 114, §2) consisting of three members each from the two houses. By virtue of this it is the oldest joint committee of the Congress, although not continuously organized as such.

Leaders of the committee typically serve as the tellers during the joint session of Congress when the electoral voters are counted in accordance with the Electoral Count Act.

== Composition ==
There are five members of each house on the committee, which has no subcommittees. The committee consists of the chair and four members of the United States Senate Committee on Rules and Administration and the United States House Committee on House Administration in the House of Representatives. Every two years the chair and vice chair rotate between the U.S. House of Representatives and the U.S. Senate.

== Committee leadership ==
A list of former chairs/vice chairs and ranking members/vice ranking members since 1947 are below.

=== Chairs ===
Name	Party	State	Start	End	Chamber
William Jenner	Republican	IN	1947	1949	Senate
Carl Hayden	Democratic	AZ	1949	1953	Senate
William Jenner	Republican	IN	1943	1955	Senate
Carl Hayden	Democratic	AZ	1955	1969	Senate
Everett Jordan	Democratic	NC	1969	1970	Senate
Samuel Friedel	Democratic	MD	1970	1971	House
Everett Jordan	Democratic	NC	1971	1972	Senate
Wayne Hays	Democratic	OH	1972	1973	House
Howard Cannon	Democratic	NV	1973	1974	Senate
Wayne Hays	Democratic	OH	1974	1975	House
Howard Cannon	Democratic	NV	1975	1976	Senate
Wayne Hays	Democratic	OH	1976		House
Frank Thompson	Democratic	NJ	1976	1977	House
Howard Cannon	Democratic	NV	1977	1978	Senate
Clay Pell	Democratic	RI	1978	1979	Senate
Frank Thompson	Democratic	NJ	1979	1980	House
Augustus Hawkins; Acting	Democratic	CA	1980	1981	House
Mac Mathias	Republican	MD	1981	1983	Senate
Augustus Hawkins	Democratic	CA	1983	1984	House
Frank Annunzio	Democratic	IL	1984	1985	House
Mac Mathias	Republican	MD	1985	1987	Senate
Frank Annunzio	Democratic	IL	1987	1989	House
Wendell Ford	Democratic	KY	1989	1991	Senate
Charlie Rose	Democratic	NC	1991	1993	House
Wendell Ford	Democratic	KY	1993	1995	Senate
Bill Thomas	Republican	CA	1995	1997	House
John Warner	Republican	VA	1997	1999	Senate
Bill Thomas	Republican	CA	1999	2001	House
???	Republican		2001		Senate
Mark Dayton	Democratic	MN	2001	2003	Senate
Bob Ney	Republican	OH	2003	2005	House
Trent Lott	Republican	MS	2005	2007	Senate
Juanita Millender-McDonald	Democratic	CA	2007		House
Bob Brady	Democratic	PA	2007	2009	House
???	Democratic		2009	2011	Senate
Gregg Harper	Republican	MS	2011	2013	House
Chuck Schumer	Democratic	NY	2013	2015	Senate
Gregg Harper	Republican	MS	2015	2017	House
Dick Shelby	Republican	AL	2017	2018	Senate
Roy Blunt	Republican	MO	2018	2019	Senate
Zoe Lofgren	Democratic	CA	2019	2021	House
Amy Klobuchar	Democratic	MN	2021	2023	Senate
Bryan Steil	Republican	WI	2023	2025	House
Mitch McConnell	Republican	KY	2025	present	Senate

=== Vice chairs ===
Name	Party	State	Start	End	Chamber
Karl LeCompte	Republican	IL	1947	1949	House
Mary Norton	Democratic	NJ	1949	1951	House
Thomas Stanley	Democratic	VA	1951	1953	House
Karl LeCompte	Republican	IL	1953	1955	House
Omar Burleson	Democratic	TX	1955	1968	House
Samuel Friedel	Democratic	MD	1968	1970	House
Everett Jordan	Democratic	NC	1970	1971	Senate
Wayne Hays	Democratic	OH	1971	1972	House
Everett Jordan	Democratic	NC	1972	1973	Senate
Wayne Hays	Democratic	OH	1973	1974	House
Howard Cannon	Democratic	NV	1974	1975	Senate
Wayne Hays	Democratic	OH	1975	1976	House
Howard Cannon	Democratic	NV	1976	1977	Senate
Frank Thompson	Democratic	NJ	1977	1979	House
Clay Pell	Democratic	RI	1979	1981	Senate
Augustus Hawkins	Democratic	CA	1981	1983	House
Mac Mathias	Republican	MD	1983	1985	Senate
Frank Annunzio	Democratic	IL	1985	1987	House
Wendell Ford	Democratic	KY	1987	1989	Senate
Frank Annunzio	Democratic	IL	1989	1991	House
Wendell Ford	Democratic	KY	1991	1993	Senate
Charlie Rose	Democratic	NC	1993	1995	House
Ted Stevens	Republican	AK	1995	1997	Senate
Bill Thomas	Republican	CA	1997	1999	House
Mitch McConnell	Republican	KY	1999	2001	Senate
Bob Ney	Republican	OH	2001	2003	House
Saxby Chambliss	Republican	GA	2003	2005	Senate
Bob Ney	Republican	OH	2005	2007	House
Dianne Feinstein	Democratic	CA	2007	2009	Senate
Bob Brady	Democratic	PA	2009	2011	House
Chuck Schumer	Democratic	NY	2011	2013	Senate
Gregg Harper	Republican	MS	2013	2015	House
Roy Blunt	Republican	MO	2015	2017	Senate
Gregg Harper	Republican	MS	2017	2019	House
Roy Blunt	Republican	MO	2019	2021	Senate
Zoe Lofgren	Democratic	CA	2021	2023	House
Amy Klobuchar	Democratic	MN	2023	2025	Senate
Bryan Steil	Republican	WI	2025	present	House

=== Ranking members ===
Name	Party	State	Start	End	Chamber
Tom Pickett	Democratic	TX	1947		House
Omar Burleson	Democratic	TX	1947	1949	House
Karl LeCompte	Republican	IL	1949	1953	House
James Trimble	Democratic	AR	1953	1955	House
Karl LeCompte	Republican	IL	1955	1959	House
Paul Schenck	Republican	OH	1959	1965	House
Glenard Lipscomb	Republican	CA	1965	1970	House
Hugh Scott	Republican	PA	1970	1971	Senate
Samuel Devine	Republican	OH	1971	1972	House
Robert Griffin	Republican	MI	1972	1973	Senate
William Dickinson	Republican	AL	1973	1974	House
Hugh Scott	Republican	PA	1974	1975	Senate
William Dickinson	Republican	AL	1975	1976	House
Hugh Scott	Republican	PA	1976	1977	Senate
William Dickinson	Republican	AL	1977	1979	House
Mark Hatfield	Republican	OR	1979	1981	Senate
Newt Gingrich	Republican	GA	1981	1983	House
Wendell Ford	Democratic	KY	1983	1985	Senate
Robert Badham	Republican	CA	1985	1987	House
Ted Stevens	Republican	AK	1987	1989	Senate
Pat Roberts	Republican	KS	1989	1991	House
Ted Stevens	Republican	AK	1991	1993	Senate
???	Republican		1993	1995	House
???	Democratic		1995	1997	Senate
???	Democratic		1997	1999	House
???	Democratic		1999	2001	Senate
???	Democratic		2001	2003	House
Mark Dayton	Democratic	MN	2003	2005	Senate
???	Democratic		2005	2007	House
???	Republican		2007	2009	Senate
Dan Lungren	Republican	CA	2009	2011	House
???	Republican		2011	2013	Senate
Bob Brady	Democratic	PA	2013	2015	House
Chuck Schumer	Democratic	NY	2015	2017	Senate
Bob Brady	Democratic	PA	2017	2019	House
Amy Klobuchar	Democratic	MN	2019	2021	Senate
Rodney Davis	Republican	IL	2021	2023	House
Deb Fischer	Republican	NE	2023	2025	Senate
Joe Morelle	Democratic	NY	2025	present	House

=== Vice ranking members ===
Name	Party	State	Start	End	Chamber
Carl Hayden	Democratic	AZ	1947	1949	Senate
William Jenner	Republican	IN	1949	1953	Senate
Carl Hayden	Democratic	AZ	1953	1955	Senate
William Jenner	Republican	IN	1955	1957	Senate
Jacob Javits	Republican	NY	1957	1959	Senate
Thruston Morton	Republican	KY	1959	1960	Senate
Norman Brunsdale	Republican	ND	1960		Senate
Thomas Martin	Republican	IA	1960	1961	Senate
Jack Miller	Republican	IA	1961	1962	Senate
Carl Curtis	Republican	NE	1962	1963	Senate
Hugh Scott	Republican	PA	1963	1970	Senate
Glenard Lipscomb	Republican	CA	1970		House
Samuel Devine	Republican	OH	1970	1971	House
Robert Griffin	Republican	MI	1971	1972	Senate
Samuel Devine	Republican	OH	1972	1973	House
Hugh Scott	Republican	PA	1973	1974	Senate
William Dickinson	Republican	AL	1974	1975	House
Hugh Scott	Republican	PA	1975	1976	Senate
William Dickinson	Republican	AL	1976	1977	House
Mark Hatfield	Republican	OR	1977	1979	Senate
William Dickinson	Republican	AL	1979	1981	House
Howard Cannon	Democratic	NV	1981	1983	Senate
Lynn Martin	Republican	IL	1983		House
Pat Roberts	Republican	KS	1983	1985	House
Wendell Ford	Democratic	KY	1985	1987	Senate
Robert Badham	Republican	CA	1987	1989	House
Ted Stevens	Republican	AK	1989	1991	Senate
Pat Roberts	Republican	KS	1991	1993	House
???	Republican		1993	1995	Senate
???	Democratic		1995	1997	House
???	Democratic		1997	1999	Senate
???	Democratic		1999	2001	House
???	Democratic		2001		Senate
???	Republican		2001	2003	Senate
John Larson	Democratic	CT	2003	2005	House
???	Democratic		2005	2007	Senate
???	Republican		2007	2009	House
???	Republican		2009	2011	Senate
???	Democratic		2011	2013	House
Pat Roberts	Republican	KS	2013	2015	Senate
Bob Brady	Democratic	PA	2015	2017	House
Amy Klobuchar	Democratic	MN	2017	2019	Senate
Rodney Davis	Republican	IL	2019	2021	House
Roy Blunt	Republican	MO	2021	2023	Senate
Joe Morelle	Democratic	NY	2023	2025	House
Alex Padilla	Democratic	CA	2025	present	Senate

== Members ==
=== 118th Congress ===
	Majority	Minority
Senate members	Amy Klobuchar, Minnesota, Vice Chair; Jeff Merkley, Oregon; Alex Padilla, California	Deb Fischer, Nebraska; Bill Hagerty, Tennessee
House members	Bryan Steil, Wisconsin, Chair; Mark Amodei, Nevada; Morgan Griffith, Virginia; Greg Murphy, North Carolina	Derek Kilmer, Washington

=== 117th Congress ===
	Majority	Minority
Senate members	Amy Klobuchar, Minnesota, Chair; Angus King, Maine; Alex Padilla, California	Roy Blunt, Missouri, Vice Ranking Member; Roger Wicker, Mississippi
House members	Zoe Lofgren, California, Vice Chair; Jamie Raskin, Maryland; Teresa Leger Fernandez, New Mexico	Rodney Davis, Illinois, Ranking Member; Barry Loudermilk, Georgia

=== 116th Congress ===
	Majority	Minority
Senate members	Roy Blunt, Missouri, Vice Chair; Pat Roberts, Kansas; Roger Wicker, Mississippi	Amy Klobuchar, Minnesota, Ranking Member; Tom Udall, New Mexico
House members	Zoe Lofgren, California, Chair; Jamie Raskin, Maryland; Susan Davis, California	Rodney Davis, Illinois, Vice Ranking Member; Barry Loudermilk, Georgia

=== 115th Congress ===
	Majority	Minority
Senate members	Richard Shelby, Alabama, Chair; Pat Roberts, Kansas; Roger Wicker, Mississippi	Amy Klobuchar, Minnesota, Tom Udall, New Mexico
House members	Rodney Davis, Illinois, Vice Chair; Gregg Harper, Mississippi; Mark Walker, North Carolina	Robert Brady, Pennsylvania, Jamie Raskin, Maryland

=== 114th Congress ===
	Majority	Minority
Senate members	Roy Blunt, Missouri, Vice Chair; Pat Roberts, Kansas; John Boozman, Arkansas	Chuck Schumer, New York, Tom Udall, New Mexico
House members	Gregg Harper, Mississippi, Chair; Candice Miller, Michigan; Rodney Davis, Illinois	Bob Brady, Pennsylvania; Juan Vargas, California

=== 113th Congress ===
	Majority	Minority
Senate members	Chuck Schumer, New York, Chair; Tom Udall, New Mexico; Mark Warner, Virginia	Pat Roberts, Kansas; Saxby Chambliss, Georgia
House members	Gregg Harper, Mississippi, Vice Chair; Candice Miller, Michigan; Rich Nugent, Florida	Bob Brady, Pennsylvania; Juan Vargas, California

== See also ==
- List of United States House of Representatives committees
- List of United States Senate committees
