= Senator Marable =

Senator Marable may refer to:

- John Hartwell Marable (1786–1844), Tennessee State Senate
- Richard Marable (born 1949), Georgia State Senate
