= Charlie Gonzalez =

American politician (born 1945)

Charlie González
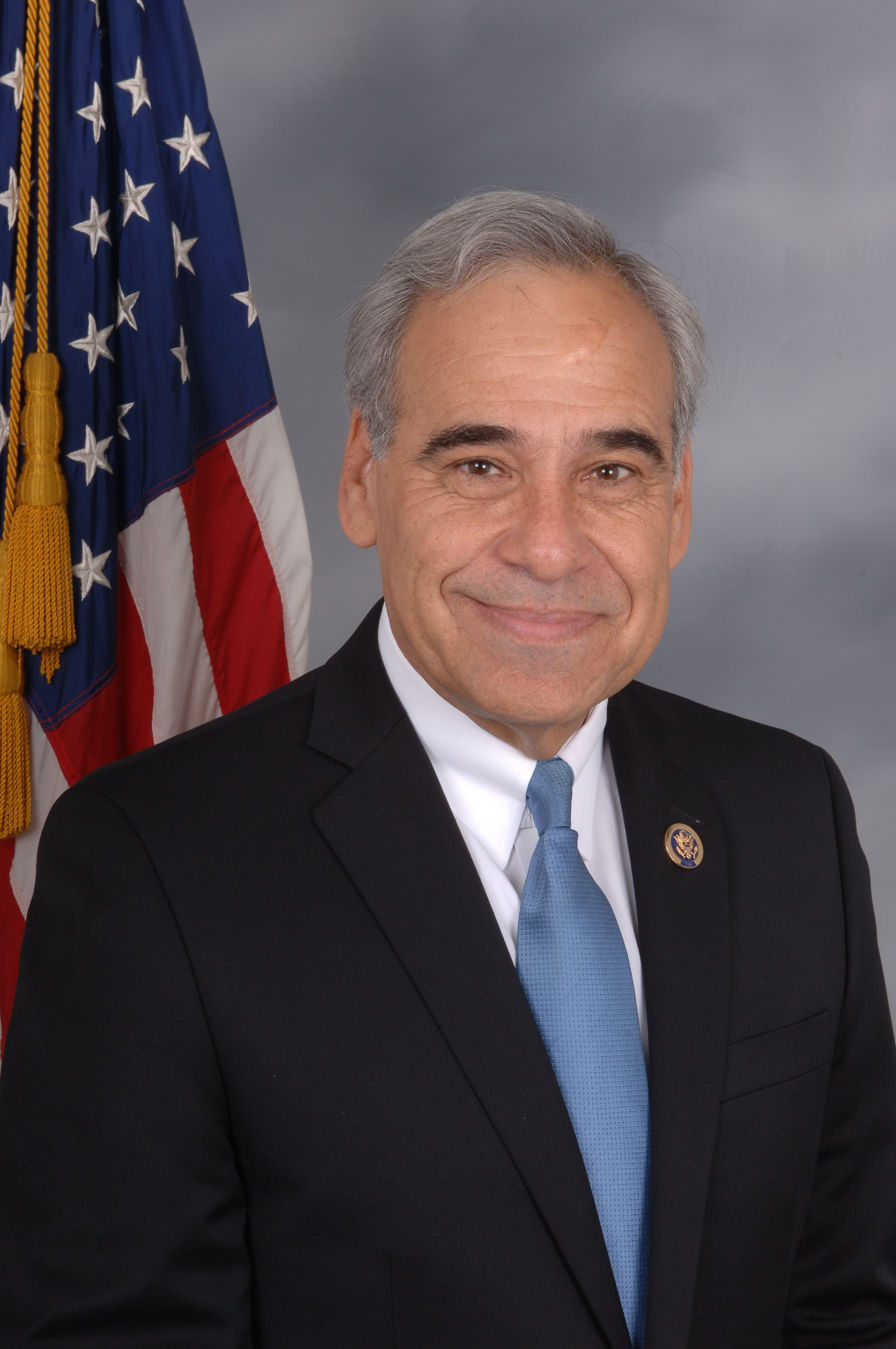

Member of the U.S. House of Representatives from Texas's 20th district
- In office January 3, 1999 – January 3, 2013
- Preceded by: Henry González
- Succeeded by: Joaquin Castro

Personal details
- Born: Charles Augustine Gonzalez; May 5, 1945 (age 81) San Antonio, Texas, U.S.
- Party: Democratic
- Relatives: Henry González (father)
- Education: University of Texas, Austin (BA); St. Mary's University, Texas (JD)

Military service
- Branch/service: United States Air Force
- Years of service: 1969–1975
- Rank: Technical Sergeant
- Unit: United States Air National Guard • Texas Air National Guard

Charles Augustine González (born May 5, 1945) is an American Democratic politician from Texas. He represented Texas's 20th congressional district in the U.S. House of Representatives from 1999 to 2013. He served as Chairman of Latinos for Obama and National Co-chair of President Obama's 2012 re-election campaign.

== Early life, education, and legal career ==
González was born in San Antonio, Texas, the son of Bertha Marie (née Cuellar) and Henry B. González, who represented the 20th from 1961 until his son took over in 1999. His parents, of Mexican descent, were both Texas-born. Charlie graduated from Thomas A. Edison High School. He received his bachelor's degree in government from the University of Texas at Austin in 1969, and then later earned his Juris Doctor degree from St. Mary's University in San Antonio in 1972. As a youth, he was a Boy Scout in Troop 90 of San Antonio. His father was the Scoutmaster.

González served as a technical sergeant in the Texas Air National Guard from 1969 until 1975. He then began practicing law until 1982, when he began rising through the ranks of the court system. He served first as an Elmendorf municipal court judge, then was elected as the judge of Bexar County Court-at-Law #2 (1983-1987), and then he was elected judge of the 57th Texas State District Court (1989-1997).

== U.S. House of Representatives ==
=== Elections ===
Henry González, of Texas's 20th congressional district, had long groomed his son to be his successor. When his father didn't seek a full 19th term in 1998, Charlie ran for the seat. In a crowded seven-way Democratic primary, Gonzalez led the field with 44%, missing the 50% threshold to avoid a run-off. In that election, he defeated San Antonio City Councilwoman Maria Antonietta Berriozabal 62%-38%. In the general election, he defeated Republican James Walker 63%-36%. He became only the fourth person to represent the 20th District since its creation in 1935. In fact, Charlie's first race was the first open-seat race in the district's 64-year history. However, he had effectively assured himself of succeeding his father with his primary win. The 20th is a heavily Democratic, majority-Hispanic district; the Republicans have only put up nominal candidates in this district since Henry won it in a 1961 special election.

Charlie kept this tradition going. He was re-elected six more times, and never won re-election with less than 63% of the vote. He only faced a Republican challenger three times, in 2004, 2008 and 2010. He had no major-party opposition in 2000 and 2006 and was completely unopposed in 2002.

He decided to retire and not seek another term in 2012.

=== Tenure ===
Charlie González was a member of the New Democrat Coalition. He was generally seen as less confrontational than his father, who once punched someone for calling him a communist. Between them, the father and son represented the 20th for 52 consecutive years; the only family combination to serve longer in the House are the Dingells of Michigan, who have represented part of the Detroit metropolitan area for over 90 consecutive years.

Rep. González was one of the first congressmen to actively support Barack Obama in the 2008 Democratic presidential primary. "Senator Obama brings all these new fresh faces,’’ Gonzalez told the San Antonio Express-News. "He has a wider audience. He has the greater potential to engage a greater number of people.’’ He also served as the 19th Chair of the Congressional Hispanic Caucus from 2011 until his retirement in 2013.

González announced on November 25, 2011, that he would not seek reelection in the 2012 congressional elections. He said he wanted a job that would allow him "to be productive and have the resources to make a better life" for himself and his family.

=== Committee assignments ===
- Committee on Energy and Commerce
  - Subcommittee on Commerce, Manufacturing and Trade
  - Subcommittee on Energy and Power
  - Subcommittee on Health
- Committee on House Administration
  - Subcommittee on Elections (Ranking Member)
  - Subcommittee on Oversight

=== Caucus memberships ===
- Congressional Hispanic Caucus (chair)
- Congressional Arts Caucus

== See also ==
- List of Hispanic and Latino Americans in the United States Congress

U.S. House of Representatives
Preceded by Henry González	Member of the U.S. House of Representatives from Texas's 20th congressional district 1999–2013	Succeeded by Joaquín Castro
Preceded by Nydia Velázquez	Chair of the Congressional Hispanic Caucus; 2011–2013	Succeeded by Rubén Hinojosa
U.S. order of precedence (ceremonial)
Preceded by Henry Bonilla as Former U.S. Representative	Order of precedence of the United States as Former U.S. Representative	Succeeded by Randy Neugebauer as Former U.S. Representative
