= Marable =

Marable is a surname. Notable people with the surname include:

- C. J. Marable (born 1997), African-American football player
- Fate Marable (1890–1947), American jazz pianist and bandleader
- John Hartwell Marable (1786–1844), American politician
- Larance Marable (1929–2012), American jazz drummer
- Manning Marable (1950–2011), American professor of public affairs, history and African-American Studies
- Maurice Marable, American director and producer
- Nick Marable (born 1987), American wrestler
- Richard Marable (1949–2025), American politician
