= Mary Teresa Norton =

American politician (1875–1959)

Mary Norton
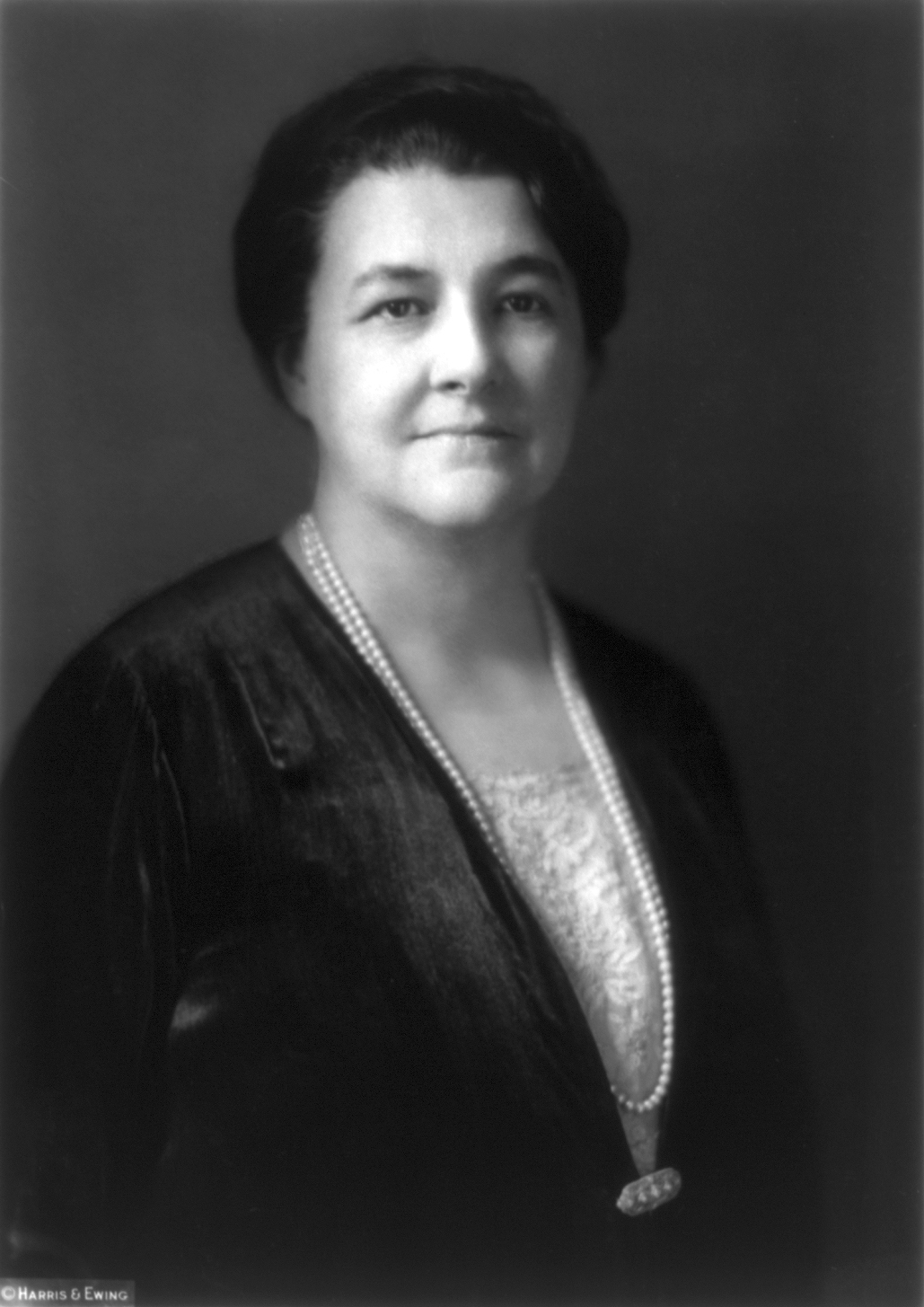

Chair of the New Jersey Democratic Party
- In office 1940–1944
- Preceded by: Crawford Jamieson
- Succeeded by: Edward J. Hart
- In office 1932–1935
- Preceded by: Harry Heher
- Succeeded by: William Kelly
House positions
Vice Chair of the Joint Committee on Printing
In office January 3, 1949 – January 3, 1951
| Preceded by | Karl M. LeCompte |
| Succeeded by | Thomas B. Stanley |
Chair of the House Administration Committee
In office January 3, 1949 – January 3, 1951
| Preceded by | Karl M. LeCompte |
| Succeeded by | Thomas B. Stanley |
Ranking Member of the House Administration Committee
In office January 3, 1947 – January 3, 1949
| Preceded by | Position established |
| Succeeded by | Karl M. LeCompte |
Chair of the House Labor Committee
In office January 3, 1937 – January 3, 1947
| Preceded by | William P. Connery Jr. |
| Succeeded by | Karl M. LeCompte |
Chair of the House District of Columbia Committee
In office January 3, 1933 – January 3, 1937
| Preceded by | Frederick N. Zihlman |
| Succeeded by | Vincent L. Palmisano |

Member of the U.S. House of Representatives from New Jersey
- In office March 4, 1925 – January 3, 1951
- Preceded by: Charles O'Brien
- Succeeded by: Alfred Sieminski
- Constituency: 12th district (1925–1933); 13th district (1933–1951)

Personal details
- Born: March 7, 1875 Jersey City, New Jersey, U.S.
- Died: August 2, 1959 (aged 84) Greenwich, Connecticut, U.S.
- Resting place: Holy Name Cemetery
- Party: Democratic
- Spouse: Robert Norton
- Education: Packard Business College (attended)

Mary Teresa Norton (née Hopkins; March 7, 1875 – August 2, 1959) was an American Democratic Party politician who represented Jersey City and Bayonne in the United States House of Representatives from 1925 to 1951.

She was the first woman member of the Democratic Party elected to Congress and the first woman elected to represent New Jersey, or any state in the Northeast. She chaired four House committees during her tenure and was a labor advocate and a supporter of women's rights.

== Early life and education ==
Born as Mary Teresa Hopkins in Jersey City, New Jersey, Norton attended parochial schools and Jersey City High School (since renamed William L. Dickinson High School). She graduated from Packard Business College, New York City in 1896. She married Robert Francis Norton in 1909.

== Early career ==
Norton was president of the Queen's Daughters' Day Nursery Association of Jersey City from 1916 to 1927. She was appointed to represent Hudson County on the New Jersey Democratic State Committee in 1920. She was elected a member of that committee in 1921, and served as vice chairperson from 1921 to 1931. She chaired the state committee from 1932 to 1935 and again from 1940 to 1944. She also served as vice chairman of the Hudson County Democratic Committee.

She was elected to the Hudson County Board of Chosen Freeholders in 1922, and was a delegate at large to the Democratic National Conventions in 1924, 1928, 1932, 1936, 1940, 1944, and 1948. She was a delegate to the International Labor Conference at Paris, France in 1945.

== Congress ==
Norton was elected as a Democrat to the 69th, 70th, 71st, 72nd, 73rd, 74th, 75th, 76th, 77th, 78th, 79th, 80th, 81st United States Congresses, serving from March 4, 1925, to January 3, 1951. She originally represented New Jersey's 12th congressional district, then composed of Jersey City and Bayonne. Later, she represented the 13th district due to reapportionment.

=== Committees ===
Norton was the chairperson of the Committee on the District of Columbia (during the 72nd to 75th Congresses), the Committee on Labor (75th to 79th Congresses), the Committee on Memorials (77th Congress), and the Committee on House Administration (81st Congress). She helped pass the Fair Labor Standards Act in 1938, working with Clara Mortenson Beyer, Frances Perkins, and Mary La Dame as part of what was colloquially called the "Ladies' Brain Trust."

Norton was not a candidate for renomination in 1950. She became a "Womanpower Consultant" for the Women's Advisory Committee on Defense Manpower, in the United States Department of Labor from 1951 to 1952.

== Later politics ==
For the 1952 Democratic National Convention, Norton led an effort to nominate party vice chairwoman India Edwards as a candidate for the vice presidential nomination.

== Death ==
Norton died on August 2, 1959, in Greenwich, Connecticut, aged 84. She was interred in the Holy Name Cemetery, Jersey City. Her memoir Madame Congressman was never published.

== Electoral history ==
=== United States House of Representatives ===
United States House of Representatives elections, 1948
| Party | Candidate | Votes | % | ±% |
|---|---|---|---|---|
| Democratic | Mary Teresa Norton (incumbent) | 84,487 | 68.05 | ▲3.62 |
| Republican | Leon Banach | 39,661 | 31.95 | |
| Total votes | | 124,148 | 100.0 | |
| Democratic hold | | | | |

United States House of Representatives elections, 1946
| Party | Candidate | Votes | % | ±% |
|---|---|---|---|---|
| Democratic | Mary Teresa Norton (incumbent) | 69,440 | 64.43 | ▼15.18 |
| Republican | John A. Jones | 36,270 | 33.66 | |
| Socialist Workers | Arlene Phillip | 1,637 | 1.52 | |
| Communist | Sol Potegol | 307 | 0.28 | |
| $250.00 State Bonds | William S. Dowd | 115 | 0.11 | |
| Total votes | | 107,769 | 100.0 | |
| Democratic hold | | | | |

United States House of Representatives elections, 1942
| Party | Candidate | Votes | % | ±% |
|---|---|---|---|---|
| Democratic | Mary Teresa Norton (incumbent) | 73,766 | 79.61 | ▲9.46 |
| Republican | Raymond J. Cuddy | 18894 | 20.39 | ▼9.44 |
| Total votes | | 92,660 | 100.0 | |
| Democratic hold | | | | |

United States House of Representatives elections, 1940
| Party | Candidate | Votes | % | ±% |
|---|---|---|---|---|
| Democratic | Mary Teresa Norton (incumbent) | 92,356 | 70.15 | ▼9.67 |
| Republican | Raymond J. Cuddy | 39,274 | 29.83 | |
| Prohibition | Oscar W. Nevins | 24 | 0.02 | |
| Total votes | | 131,654 | 100.0 | |
| Democratic hold | | | | |

United States House of Representatives elections, 1938
| Party | Candidate | Votes | % | ±% |
|---|---|---|---|---|
| Democratic | Mary Teresa Norton (incumbent) | 89,287 | 79.82 | ▲4.01 |
| Republican | T. Burton Coyle | 22,459 | 20.08 | |
| Communist | Jay Anyon | 121 | 0.11 | |
| Total votes | | 111,867 | 100.0 | |
| Democratic hold | | | | |

United States House of Representatives elections, 1936
| Party | Candidate | Votes | % | ±% |
|---|---|---|---|---|
| Democratic | Mary Teresa Norton (incumbent) | 93,702 | 75.81 | ▲2.6 |
| Republican | John J. Grossi | 27,615 | 22.34 | |
| National Union for Social Justice | Charles V. McCarthy | 2,099 | 1.7 | |
| Socialist | Jacob Neiburg | 57 | 0.05 | |
| National Union for Social Justice | Milton Rosenzweig | 54 | 0.04 | |
| National Union for Social Justice | Warren Taylor | 38 | 0.03 | |
| Communist | Louis Slootsky | 34 | 0.03 | |
| Total votes | | 123,599 | 100.0 | |
| Democratic hold | | | | |

United States House of Representatives elections, 1934
| Party | Candidate | Votes | % | ±% |
|---|---|---|---|---|
| Democratic | Mary Teresa Norton (incumbent) | 73,342 | 73.21 | ▲1.12 |
| Republican | Anthony L. Montelli | 26,447 | 26.4 | |
| Socialist | William Kane Tallman | 281 | 0.28 | |
| Communist | Stanley Szelazek | 105 | 0.1 | |
| Total votes | | 100,175 | 99.99 | |
| Democratic hold | | | | |

United States House of Representatives elections, 1932
| Party | Candidate | Votes | % | ±% |
|---|---|---|---|---|
| Democratic | Mary Teresa Norton (incumbent) | 73,779 | 72.09 | ▼3.83 |
| Republican | Mortimer Neuman | 27,965 | 27.32 | |
| Socialist | Archibald Craig | 348 | 0.34 | ▲0.05 |
| Liberty | Michael G. Pipi | 115 | 0.11 | |
| Communist | Max Botwinick | 106 | 0.1 | |
| Socialist Labor | George Ludwig | 33 | 0.03 | |
| Total votes | | 102,346 | 99.99 | |
| Democratic hold | | | | |

United States House of Representatives elections, 1930
| Party | Candidate | Votes | % | ±% |
|---|---|---|---|---|
| Democratic | Mary Teresa Norton (incumbent) | 53,565 | 75.92 | ▲13.94 |
| Republican | Douglas D. T. Story | 16,715 | 23.69 | |
| Socialist | Archibald Craig | 206 | 0.29 | |
| Communist | Nathaniel Honig | 67 | 0.09 | |
| Total votes | | 70,553 | 99.99 | |
| Democratic hold | | | | |

United States House of Representatives elections, 1928
| Party | Candidate | Votes | % |
|---|---|---|---|
| Democratic | Mary Teresa Norton (incumbent) | 56,748 | 61.98 |
| Republican | Philip W. Grece | 34,817 | 38.02 |
| Total votes | | 91,565 | 100.0 |
| Democratic hold | | | |

== See also ==
- Women in the United States House of Representatives

U.S. House of Representatives
| Preceded by Charles O'Brien | Member of the U.S. House of Representatives from New Jersey's 12th congressional district 1925–1933 | Succeeded by Frederick Lehlbach |
| Preceded by Frederick Zihlman | Chair of the House District of Columbia Committee; 1931–1933 | Succeeded by Jennings Randolph |
| New constituency | Member of the U.S. House of Representatives from New Jersey's 13th congressional district 1933–1951 | Succeeded by Alfred Sieminski |
| Preceded by William Connery | Chair of the House Labor Committee; 1937–1947 | Succeeded by Fred Hartley |
| New office | Ranking Member of the House Memorials Committee; 1947–1949 | Succeeded by Karl M. LeCompte |
| Preceded by Alfred Bulwinkle | Chair of the House Memorials Committee; 1941–1943 | Succeeded by John Murdock |
| Preceded by Karl Le Compte | Chair of the House Administration Committee; 1949–1951 | Succeeded by Thomas Stanley |
| Preceded by Karl Le Compte | Chair of the Joint Library Committee; 1949–1951 | Succeeded by Thomas Stanley |
| Preceded by Karl Le Compte | Chair of the Joint Printing Committee; 1949–1951 | Succeeded by Thomas Stanley |
Party political offices
| Preceded by Harry Heher | Chair of the New Jersey Democratic Party; 1932–1935 | Succeeded by William Kelly |
| Preceded by Crawford Jamieson | Chair of the New Jersey Democratic Party; 1940–1944 | Succeeded by Edward Hart |
