= United States House Administration Subcommittee on Elections =

Legislative body

Subcommittee of Committee on House Administration
- Active United States House of Representatives; 119th Congress

Leadership
- Chair: Laurel M. Lee (R)
- Ranking Member: Terri Sewell (D)

Structure
- Seats: 6 (6 currently filled) 4/4 2/2
- Political parties: Majority (4): Republican (4); Minority (2): Democratic (2)

Meeting place
- 1309, Longworth House Office Building; Washington, D.C. 20515

Phone number
- (202)-225-8281

The House Administration Subcommittee on Elections is the senior subcommittee of the House Committee on House Administration.

The subcommittee itself represents the Committee on House Administration’s status as the longest-standing committee of the House, tracing its history to the Committee on Elections in the first Congress under the Constitution. In recent years, it was extant for the 110th Congress, along with the Subcommittee on Capitol Security, at the urging of then Chairwoman Rep. Juanita Millender-McDonald. While active during the 111th Congress, the subcommittee became moribund in the 112th, holding only four hearings, the last in November 2011. (In contrast Ranking Member Charlie Gonzalez organized minority party-led congressional fora on campaign finance and voting rights.)

In 2013, the committee, then under Republican control, abolished the subcommittee. Following the 2018 elections, in which Democrats retook control of the House, Nancy Pelosi announced plans to restore the subcommittee and appoint Representative Marcia Fudge as chair.

== Jurisdiction ==
Matters relating to federal elections and such other matters as may be referred to the subcommittee.

== Members, 119th Congress ==
Majority	Minority
Laurel Lee, Florida, Chair; Barry Loudermilk, Georgia; Greg Murphy, North Carolina; Mary Miller, Illinois	Terri Sewell, Alabama, Ranking Member; Julie Johnson, Texas
Ex officio
Bryan Steil, Wisconsin	Joseph Morelle, New York

== Historical membership rosters ==
=== 118th Congress ===
Majority	Minority
Laurel Lee, Florida, Chair; Barry Loudermilk, Georgia; Stephanie Bice, Oklahoma; Anthony D'Esposito, New York	Terri Sewell, Alabama, Ranking Member; Norma Torres, California
Ex officio
Bryan Steil, Wisconsin	Joseph Morelle, New York

=== 117th Congress ===
Majority	Minority
G. K. Butterfield, North Carolina, Chair; Pete Aguilar, California; Teresa Leger Fernandez, New Mexico	Bryan Steil, Wisconsin, Ranking Member

=== 116th Congress ===
Majority	Minority
Marcia Fudge, Ohio, Chair; G. K. Butterfield, North Carolina; Pete Aguilar, California	Rodney Davis, Illinois, Ranking Member

=== 112th Congress ===
Majority	Minority
Gregg Harper, Mississippi, Chair; Aaron Schock, Illinois; Rich Nugent, Florida; Todd Rokita, Indiana	Charlie Gonzalez, Texas, Ranking Member; Bob Brady, Pennsylvania
