= Samuel Friedel =

American politician (1898–1979)

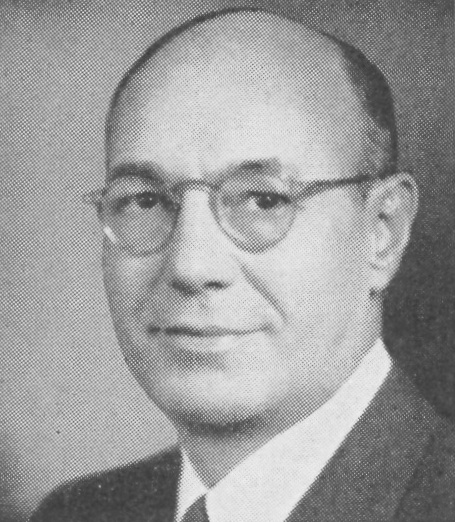
Rep. Samuel Friedel, 1953 from Congressional Pictorial Directory

Samuel Nathaniel Friedel (April 18, 1898 – March 21, 1979), a Democrat, was a U.S. Congressman who represented the 7th congressional district of Maryland from January 3, 1953, to January 3, 1971.

Born in Washington, D.C., to Russian-Jewish immigrants, Friedel moved with his family to Baltimore, Maryland, when he was six months old and attended the public schools in Baltimore and Strayer Business College. He worked as a mailing clerk in a Baltimore store from 1919 to 1923.

In 1926, Friedel founded the Industrial Loan Co., serving as president until 1956. Friedel served in the Maryland House of Delegates from 1935 to 1939 and served as a member of the city council of Baltimore from 1939 to 1952, representing the first and later the fifth district. He served as a delegate to the Democratic National Convention in 1964 and 1968.

Friedel was elected as a Democrat to the Eighty-third and to the eight succeeding Congresses, serving from January 3, 1953, until January 3, 1971. While in congress, he served as chairman of the Committee on House Administration (Ninetieth and Ninety-first Congresses), the Joint Committee on the Library (Ninety-first Congress) and the Joint Committee on Printing (Ninety-first Congress). Friedel did not sign the 1956 Southern Manifesto, and voted in favor of the Civil Rights Acts of 1957, 1960, 1964, and 1968, as well as the 24th Amendment to the U.S. Constitution and the Voting Rights Act of 1965. For the most part, Friedel’s voting record in Congress was a liberal one. He was an unsuccessful candidate for renomination in 1970 to the Ninety-second Congress.

Friedel died in Towson, Maryland and is buried in the Hebrew Friendship Cemetery in Baltimore.

== See also ==
- List of Jewish members of the United States Congress

U.S. House of Representatives
Preceded by new district	Member of the U.S. House of Representatives from Maryland's 7th congressional district 1953–1971	Succeeded by Parren Mitchell
