= Preston Smith (Georgia state politician) =

American politician

Member of the Georgia Senate

Member of the Georgia State Senate from the 52nd district
- In office 2003–2011
- Preceded by: Richard Marable
- Succeeded by: Barry Loudermilk

Personal details
- Born: Preston W. Smith; November 11 Atlanta, Georgia, U.S.
- Party: Republican
- Spouse: Michelle Smith (m. 1993; div. 2009) Elizabeth Smith (m. 2012)
- Children: 6
- Education: Baylor University (BBA); University of Georgia School of Law (JD)
- Profession: Healthcare executive, attorney, politician

Preston W. Smith is an American politician, attorney and healthcare executive from the U.S. state of Georgia.

Smith earned a Bachelor of Business Administration (B.B.A.) from Southern Baptist Convention affiliated Baylor University and a J.D. from the University of Georgia and practiced law before turning to electoral politics. Republican candidate Smith was elected to the Georgia State Senate for District 52 in 2002 by defeating Democratic candidate Richard Marable 16,957 votes (54.2%) to 14,329 votes (45.8%). Serving as Governor Sonny Perdue’s floor leader in the Senate, Smith also served as Chairman of the Senate Judiciary Committee and served on several others, including vice-chairman, Health & Human Services as secretary, Appropriations, Ethics & Government Reform as vice-chairman, Health & Human Services as secretary, Appropriations as subcommittee chair over the Judiciary budget, Economic Development & Tourism and Legislative Services. He also served as Chairman of the Legislative Oversight Committee for the newly formed statewide Public Defenders Standards Council. Smith is a member of the Gridiron Secret Society as well as serving on the board of directors at the Summit Ministries, an evangelical Christian organization focusing on high school and college aged Christians. In 2005, he successfully led the effort to reform Georgia's statewide civil liability system (SB3, 2005).

Following his political service, Smith became president of Premier Anesthesia.

Georgia State Senate
Preceded by Richard Marable	Member of the Georgia State Senate from the 52nd district 2003–2011	Succeeded by Barry Loudermilk
