= Ken Fuller =

Real estate agent and lawyer

Member of the Georgia House of Representatives from 16th district
- In office 1979 – October 14, 1981
- Succeeded by: Patrick E. Montgomery

Member of the Georgia State Senate from the 52nd district
- In office 1989–???
- Succeeded by: Richard Marable

Personal details
- Born: October 1, 1943 (age 83) Floyd County, Georgia, U.S.
- Party: Democratic
- Education: University of Georgia Law School

Kenneth Fuller (born October 1, 1943) is a real estate agent and retired lawyer who served in the Georgia House of Representatives and Georgia State Senate. He lives in Florida.

Fuller was born in Floyd County, Georgia. He attended the University of Georgia Law School. He wrote columns for the Rome News-Tribune.

== See also ==
- 136th Georgia General Assembly
