= Georgia's 52nd Senate district =

State district in Georgia, USA

Georgia's 52nd State Senate district
Senator
Chuck Hufstetler; R–Rome
- Demographics: 73.8% White; 11.4% Black; 11.5% Hispanic; 1.2% Asian
- Population: 172,206

District 52 of the Georgia Senate elects one member of the Georgia State Senate. It contains parts of Bartow, Floyd and Gordon counties.

== State senators ==
- Ken Fuller (1989–1991)
- Richard Marable (1991–2003)
- Preston Smith (2003–2011)
- Barry Loudermilk (2011–2013)
- Chuck Hufstetler (since 2013)
