= Gregg Harper =

American politician (born 1956)

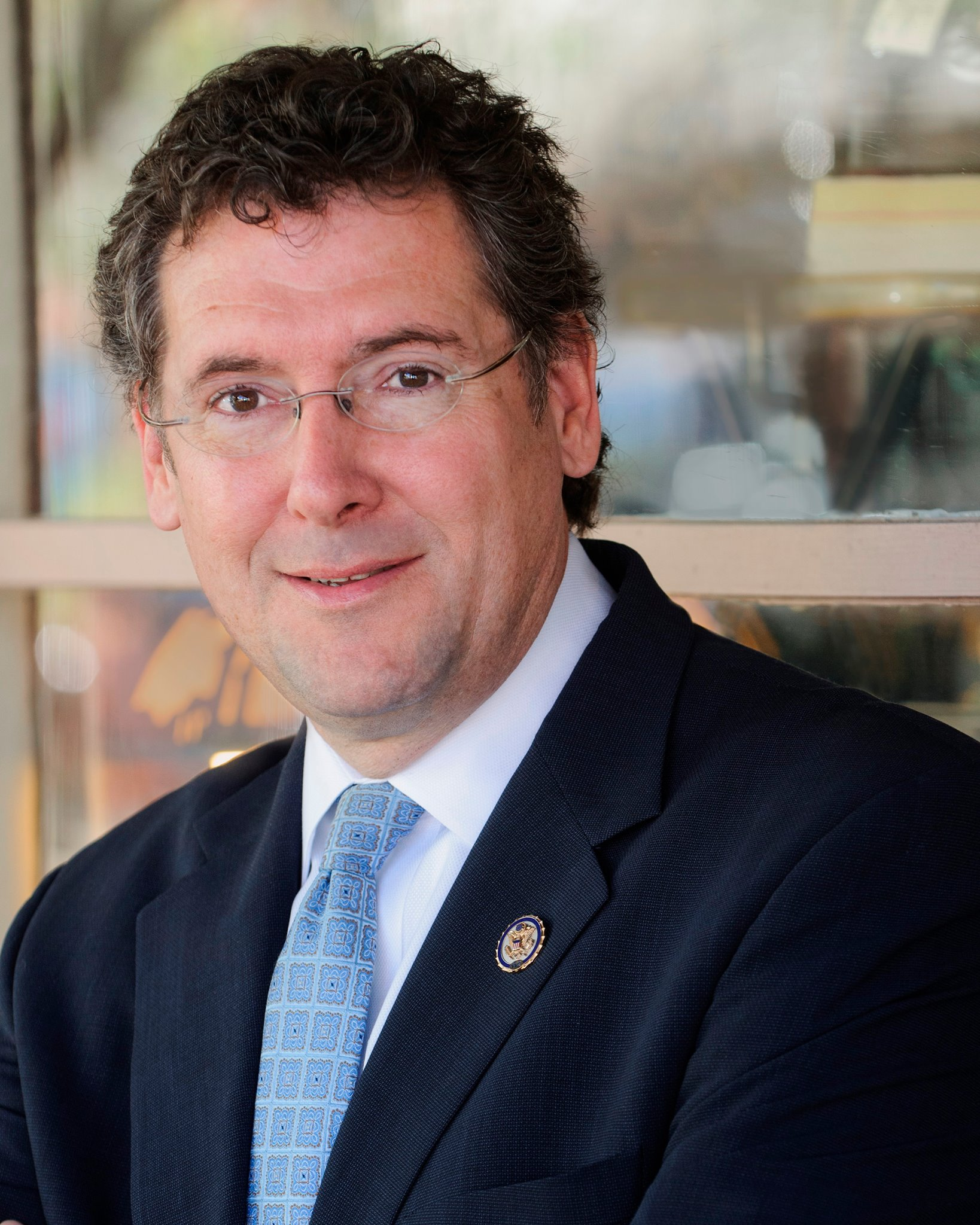

Chair of the House Administration Committee
- In office January 3, 2017 – January 3, 2019
- Preceded by: Candice Miller
- Succeeded by: Zoe Lofgren

Member of the U.S. House of Representatives from Mississippi's 3rd district
- In office January 3, 2009 – January 3, 2019
- Preceded by: Chip Pickering
- Succeeded by: Michael Guest

Personal details
- Born: Gregory Livingston Harper; June 1, 1956 (age 70) Jackson, Mississippi, U.S.
- Party: Republican
- Spouse: Sidney Harper (m. 1984)
- Children: 2
- Education: Mississippi College (BS); University of Mississippi (JD)

Gregory Livingston Harper (born June 1, 1956) is a former American politician who served as the U.S. representative for Mississippi's 3rd congressional district from 2009 to 2019. He is a member of the Republican Party. The district includes the wealthier portions of the state capital, Jackson, along with most of that city's suburbs. Other cities in the district include Meridian, Natchez, Starkville, and Brookhaven.

In January 2018, Harper announced he would retire from Congress and not run for re-election.

== Early life, education, and career ==
Harper was born in Jackson, Mississippi. He spent eight years working as chairman of the Rankin County, Mississippi Republican Party and served as a delegate to the 2000 Republican National Convention. He was appointed by the party as an observer during the 2000 Florida presidential recount.

Harper graduated from Mississippi College in 1978 with a degree in chemistry and from the University of Mississippi School of Law in 1981. He has worked as a private practice attorney since receiving this degree. He was the prosecuting attorney for the cities of Brandon, Mississippi and Richland, Mississippi.

== U.S. House of Representatives ==
=== Committee assignments ===
- Joint Committee of Congress on the Library (Chair)
- Committee on Energy and Commerce
  - Subcommittee on Digital Commerce and Consumer Protection (Vice Chair)
  - Subcommittee on Environment and Economy
- Committee on Ethics
- Committee on House Administration (Chair)
  - Subcommittee on Elections

=== Caucus memberships ===
- Republican Study Committee
- Congressional Arts Caucus
- Veterinary Medicine Caucus
- U.S.-Japan Caucus

=== Tenure ===
Harper introduced the Gabriella Miller Kids First Research Act (H.R. 2019; 113th Congress) into the House on May 16, 2013. The bill, which passed in both the House and the Senate, would end taxpayer contributions to the Presidential Election Campaign Fund and divert the money in that fund to pay for research into pediatric cancer through the National Institutes of Health. The total funding for research would come to $126 million over 10 years. As of 2014, the national conventions got about 23% of their funding from the Presidential Election Campaign Fund.

Harper was ranked as the 89th most bipartisan member of the U.S. House of Representatives during the 114th United States Congress (and the most bipartisan member of the U.S. House of Representatives from Mississippi) in the Bipartisan Index created by The Lugar Center and the McCourt School of Public Policy.

In December 2017, as chairman of the House Committee on Administration, Harper supported a review of overhauling the Congressional Accountability Act which makes it harder for victims of sexual harassment to come forward with allegations than victims in the private sector. Harper said a review was "long overdue".

=== Elections ===
Harper won the Republican nomination in Mississippi's 3rd congressional district on April 1, 2008, with 57% of the vote. This was tantamount to election in this heavily Republican district. He defeated his Democratic opponent, Joel Gill in the November general election winning 63% of the vote.

== Personal life ==
He is a deacon of Crossgates Baptist Church in Brandon, Mississippi, where he had also been a Sunday School teacher.

He has a son with Fragile X syndrome. Harper started a congressional internship program for students with developmental disabilities through the Mason Life Program at George Mason University.

U.S. House of Representatives
Preceded by Chip Pickering	Member of the U.S. House of Representatives from Mississippi's 3rd congressional district 2009–2019	Succeeded by Michael Guest
Preceded by Chuck Schumer	Chair of the Joint Library Committee; 2013–2015	Succeeded by Roy Blunt
Preceded by Chuck Schumer	Chair of the Joint Printing Committee; 2015–2017	Succeeded by Richard Shelby
Preceded by Candice Miller	Chair of the House Administration Committee; 2017–2019	Succeeded by Zoe Lofgren
Preceded by Roy Blunt	Chair of the Joint Library Committee; 2017–2019	Succeeded by Roy Blunt
U.S. order of precedence (ceremonial)
Preceded by Michael Parker as Former U.S. Representative	Order of precedence of the United States as Former U.S. Representative	Succeeded by Glenn Poshard as Former U.S. Representative
