= Patrick E. Montgomery =

American politician

Member of the Georgia House of Representatives from the 16th district
- In office 1982–1983
- Preceded by: Ken Fuller
- Succeeded by: John Adams

Personal details
- Born: August 31, 1946 Floyd County, Georgia, U.S.
- Died: November 16, 2009 (aged 63)
- Party: Republican
- Spouse: Linda Marie Sprayberry
- Children: 2
- Education: Shorter University; Berry College

Patrick E. Montgomery (August 31, 1946 – November 16, 2009) was an American politician who served for the 16th district in the Georgia House of Representatives. He was a Republican.

== Life and career ==
Montgomery was born in Floyd County, Georgia. He attended Shorter University and Berry College.

In 1982, Montgomery was elected to represent the 16th district of the Georgia House of Representatives, winning a special election to complete Ken Fuller’s leftover term. He served until 1983, when he was succeeded by John Adams.

Montgomery died in November 2009, at the age of 63.
