= Terri Sewell =

American politician (born 1965)

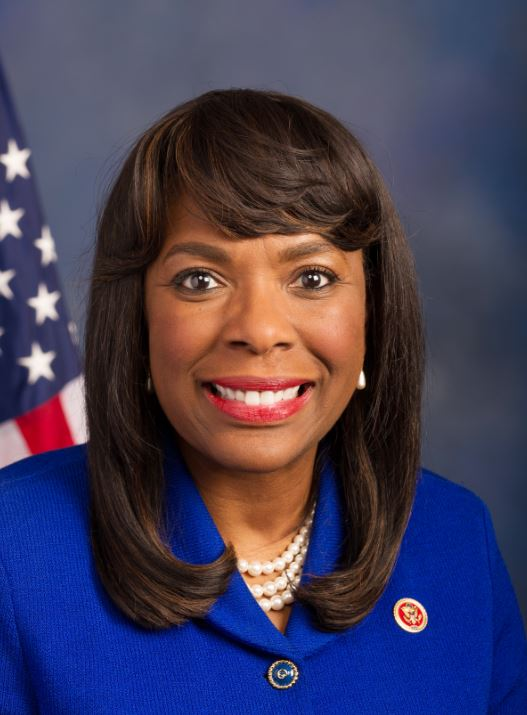
- Official portrait, 2014

Member of the U.S. House of Representatives from Alabama's 7th district
- Incumbent
- Assumed office January 3, 2011
- Preceded by: Artur Davis

Personal details
- Born: Terrycina Andrea Sewell; January 1, 1965 (age 61) Huntsville, Alabama, U.S.
- Party: Democratic
- Spouse: Theodore Dixie (m. 1998, divorced)
- Relatives: Briana Sewell (cousin)
- Education: Princeton University (BA); St Hilda's College, Oxford (BA); Harvard University (JD)
- Website: House website Campaign website
- Sewell's voice Sewell supporting the Inflation Reduction Act. Recorded August 12, 2022

Terrycina Andrea "Terri" Sewell (/ˈsjuːəl/; born January 1, 1965) is an American politician and lawyer serving as the U.S. representative for Alabama's 7th congressional district as member of the Democratic Party since 2011. The district includes most of the Black Belt, as well as most of the predominantly African American portions of Birmingham and Tuscaloosa.

A native of Huntsville, Sewell studied at Princeton University for a bachelor's, Harvard Law School for a Juris Doctor degree, and St Hilda's College, Oxford for a second bachelor's that was promoted by tradition to an MA. Before entering politics, she was a securities lawyer for Davis Polk & Wardwell and a public finance lawyer for Maynard, Cooper & Gale, where she was the first Black woman to make partner. She is the first African-American woman elected to Congress from Alabama and, along with Republican Martha Roby, was one of the first women elected to Congress from Alabama in a regular election.

== Early life and education ==
Terri Sewell was born in Huntsville, Alabama, to Andrew A. Sewell, a former high school basketball coach, and Nancy Gardner Sewell, a retired high school librarian and former Selma city council member. Her mother was the first Black woman elected to Selma's city council. As a child, Sewell wanted to be a star on Broadway. Because her mother had hoped for her to become a lawyer, Sewell joined the debate team in high school. She was the first Black valedictorian of Selma High School.

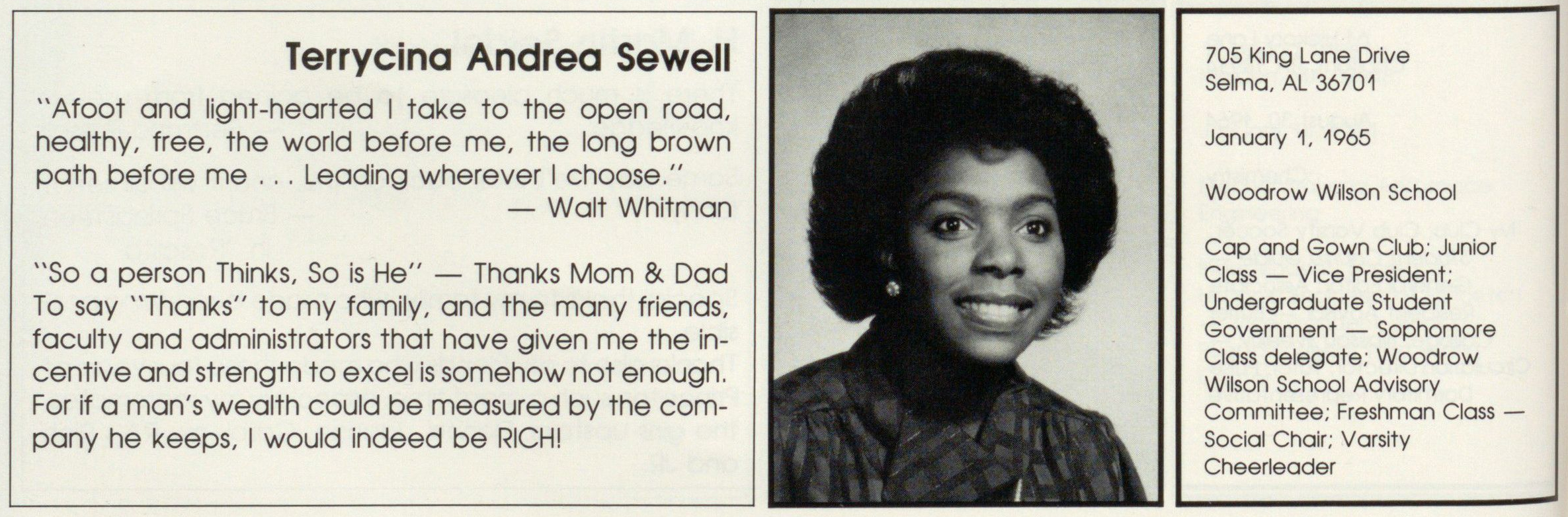
Sewell in the Princeton University yearbook, 1986

After graduating from high school, Sewell went to Princeton University where she studied public and international affairs. She was the first Selma High School graduate to attend an Ivy League school. She was recruited to attend Princeton by Julian L. McPhillips, who read about her in the local Selma newspaper. At Princeton, she befriended Michelle Obama, who served as what Sewell called her "big sister" on campus. Sewell completed a 158-page long senior thesis, "Black Women in Politics: Our Time Has Come". During her time at Princeton, she interned with Richard Shelby (then a Democrat) and Howell Heflin.

After graduating from Princeton in 1986, Sewell attended St Hilda's College, Oxford where she was a Marshall Scholar. It was there that she befriended Susan Rice. Her thesis was on the election of the first black members of the British parliament, and later published as a book, Black Tribunes: Race and Representation in British Politics (1993). Sewell graduated from Oxford with a degree in political science in 1988. She attended Harvard Law School for her Juris Doctor, which she completed in 1992. There she overlapped with and was friends with Barack Obama, who became a lifelong friend and influenced Sewell's decision to enter politics.

== Early career ==
After graduation, Sewell served as a judicial law clerk in Birmingham, Alabama, to Chief Judge U. W. Clemon, In New York, she worked at Davis Polk & Wardwell, alongside Kirsten Gillibrand, starting in 1994. Sewell returned to Alabama in 2004, due to her father's health problems. She worked for another law firm, Maynard, Cooper & Gale PC, where she was the first black woman partner. She was a public finance lawyer.

In 2007, Sewell was at Brown Chapel A.M.E. Church, where she is a member, when then Senator Barack Obama spoke during the 2008 United States presidential election. Sewell credits Obama's speech (in which he asked "[t]he questions that I have today is, what's called of us in this Joshua generation? What do we do in order to fulfill that legacy, to fulfill the obligations and the debt that we owe to those who allowed us to be here today?") as the catalyst for her serving in politics. Weeks after his speech, Gillibrand called Sewell, recruiting Sewell to run for office.

== U.S. House of Representatives ==
=== Elections ===
==== 2010 ====
After four-term Democratic incumbent Artur Davis gave up the seat to run for governor, Sewell entered the Democratic primary, the real contest in this majority Democratic, majority-black district. She finished first in the four-way primary with 36.8% of the vote. In the runoff, she defeated Jefferson County Commissioner Sheila Smoot with 55% of the vote. In the general election, Sewell defeated Republican opponent Don Chamberlain with 72.4% of the vote as expected.

==== 2012 ====
Sewell was the only candidate to file for the Democratic nomination in 2012 and defeated Chamberlain again in the general election. This was the last time Sewell had a Republican opponent until 2022.

==== 2014 ====
Sewell was challenged in the Democratic primary by Tamara Harris Johnson, a former Birmingham City Attorney. She defeated Johnson with 83.9% of the vote, effectively clinching a third term.

==== 2016 ====
Sewell won a fourth term against a write-in opponent.

==== 2018 ====
Sewell won a fifth term against a write-in opponent.

==== 2020 ====
Sewell won a sixth term against a write-in opponent.

==== 2022 ====
Sewell defeated Republican nominee Beatrice Nichols and Libertarian nominee Gavin Goodman in the general election, clinching her seventh term.

=== Tenure ===
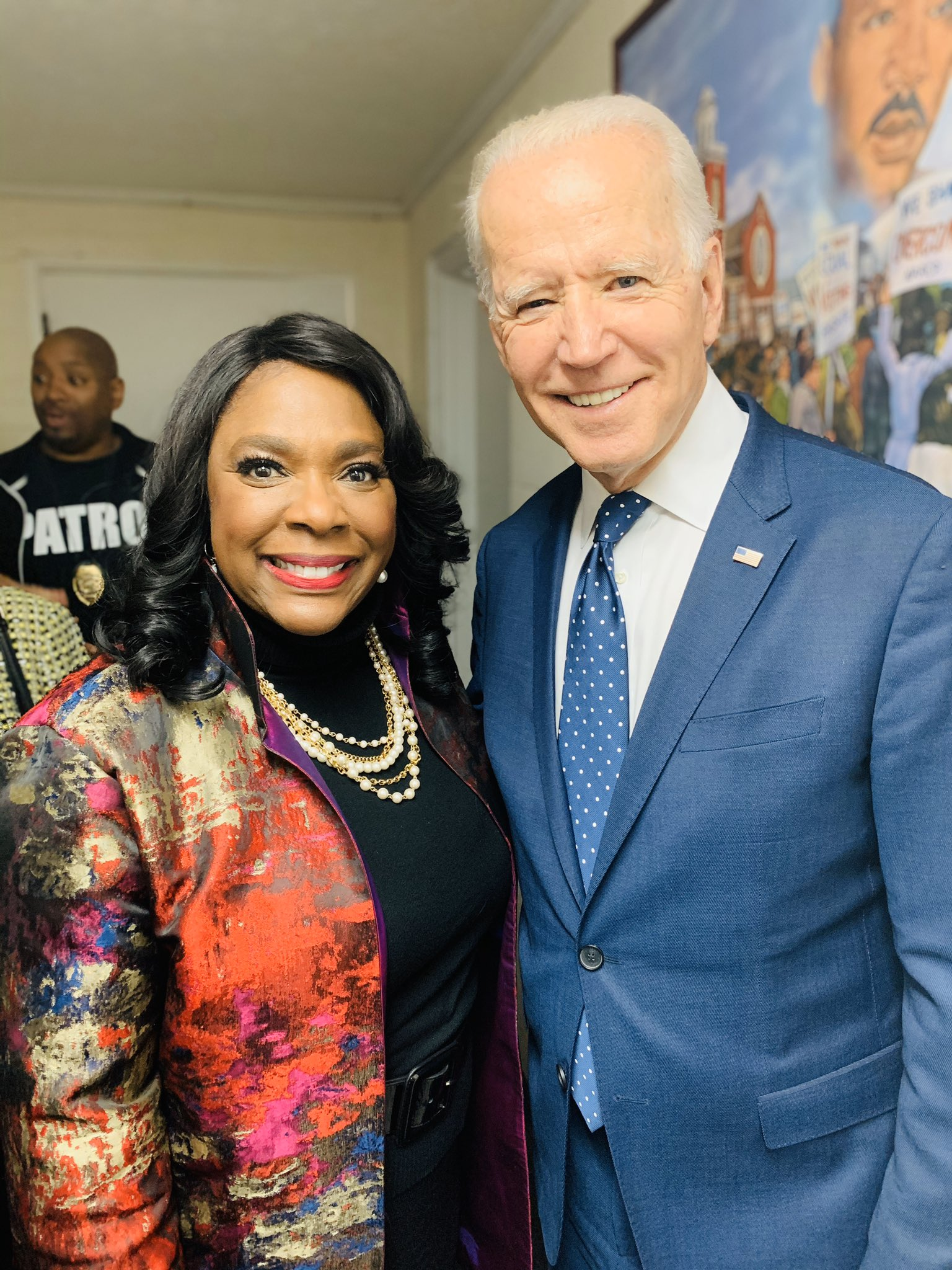
Sewell and then former vice president Joe Biden in 2020

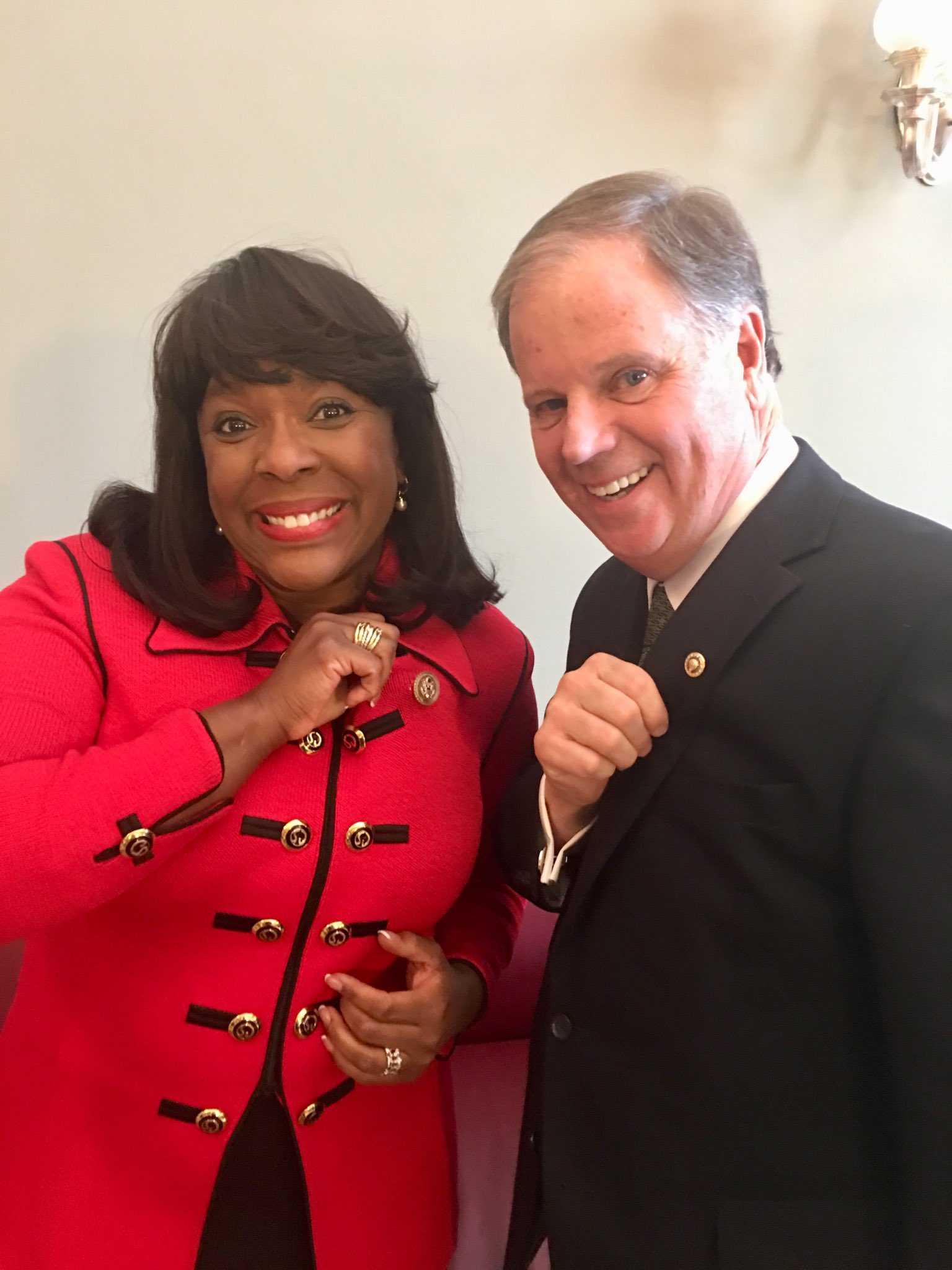
Sewell and U.S. Senator Doug Jones in January 2018

For the 114th United States Congress, Sewell was ranked as the 94th most bipartisan member of the House (and the most bipartisan member of the House from Alabama) in the Bipartisan Index created by The Lugar Center and the McCourt School of Public Policy, which ranks members of Congress by their degree of bipartisanship (by measuring how often each member's bills attract co-sponsors from the opposite party and each member co-sponsors bills by members of the opposite party).

Sewell has established herself as a liberal with a focus on job creation, and arguably has the most left-wing voting record of any person to represent Alabama in Congress. She is a member of the Congressional Black Caucus. In January 2020, Sewell endorsed Joe Biden for president. As of October 2021, Sewell had voted in line with Biden's stated position 100% of the time.

=== Committee assignments ===
For the 119th Congress:

- Committee on House Administration
  - Subcommittee on Elections (Ranking Member)
- Committee on Ways and Means
  - Subcommittee on Oversight
  - Subcommittee on Trade
  - Subcommittee on Social Security
- Joint Committee on Printing

=== Caucus memberships ===
- Congressional Arts Caucus
- Congressional Black Caucus
- Congressional Equality Caucus
- New Democrat Coalition (vice chair)
- Congressional Voting Rights Caucus
- Congressional Cement Caucus
- Black Maternal Health Caucus
- Afterschool Caucuses

== Political positions ==
Sewell voted with President Joe Biden's stated position 100% of the time in the 117th Congress, according to a FiveThirtyEight analysis.

=== Abortion and women's issues ===
Sewell supports abortion rights. Sewell opposed the Human Life Protection Act, which went into effect in 2019. She described the bill as "both blatantly unconstitutional and a brazen, extremist attack on women's rights." She also opposed the June 2022 overturning of Roe v. Wade, calling it "devastating" and expressing concern that "state legislatures across the country will now begin racing to criminalize reproductive health care."

In 2013, Sewell voted to reauthorize the Violence Against Women Act.

=== Economic issues ===
Sewell is a proponent of a $15 minimum wage. In 2019, she voted for the Paycheck Fairness Act, an act to address the gender pay gap. Sewell supports tariffs on countries involved in currency manipulation. She voted for the Currency Reform for Fair Trade Act 2010. Sewell supported President Obama's plan to extend tax cuts for low- and middle-income Americans, but declined to discuss her stance on taxation for high-income Americans. In response to President Obama's Framework for Business Tax Reform, Sewell said: "I applaud the President for outlining a bold framework for reforming the U.S. business tax system." In 2019, Sewell worked with Ivanka Trump to develop policies related to paid parental leave. Sewell supports eliminating the Military Widow's Tax. Sewell has voted against work requirements for welfare recipients. During the 2023 United States debt-ceiling crisis, Sewell voted for the Fiscal Responsibility Act of 2023.

=== Voting rights ===
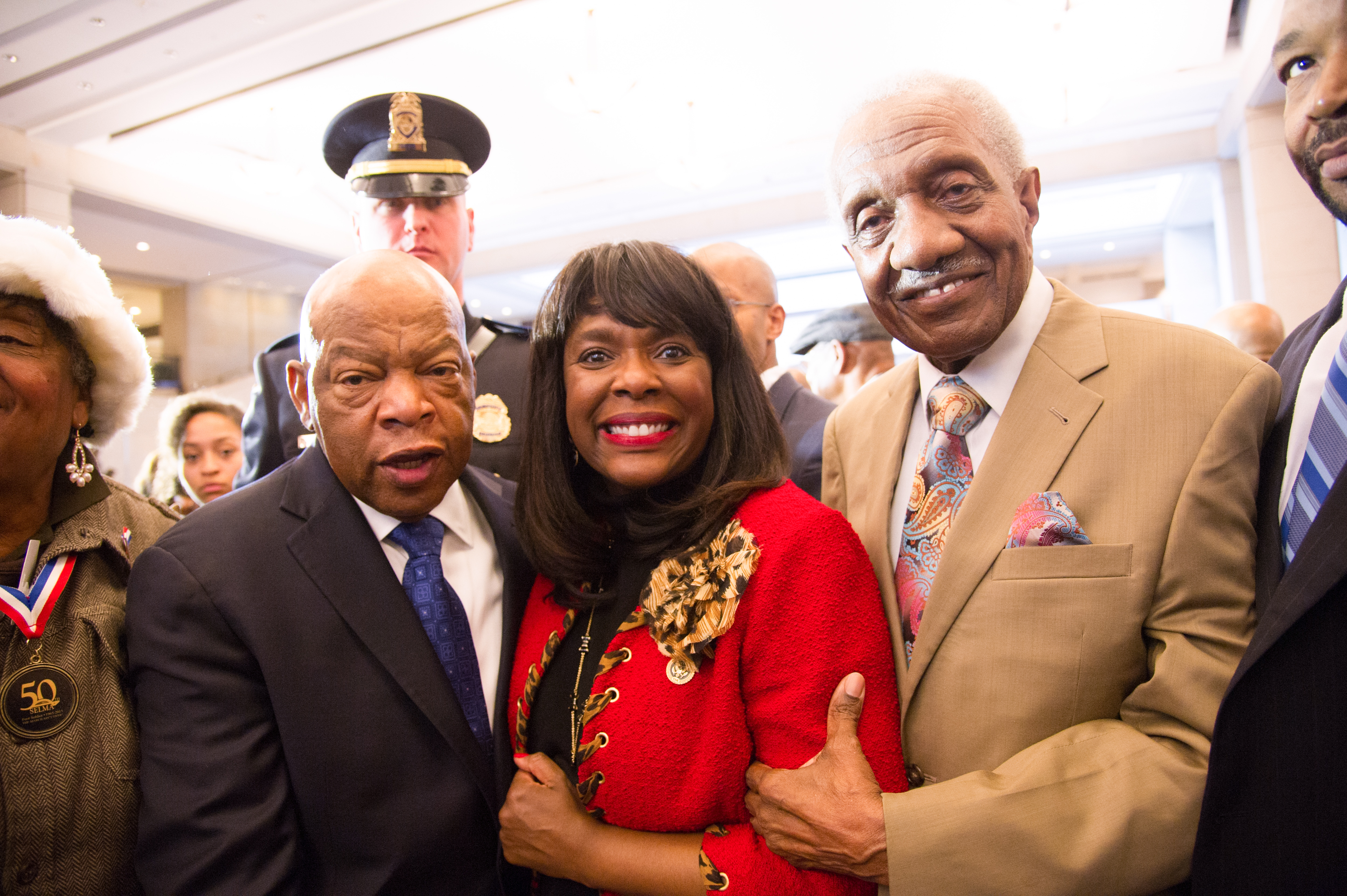
Terri Sewell with John Lewis and Frederick D. Reese in 2016

In 2019, Sewell sponsored the Voting Rights Advancement Act (which later became the John Lewis Voting Rights Act), which would update the Voting Rights Act of 1965 by providing increased oversight of voting changes, updating the pre-clearance formula to oversee contemporary discrimination patterns, and expanding the Attorney General's power to send federal observers to jurisdictions in areas at risk of voting discrimination. In 2019, Sewell co-sponsored the For the People Act of 2019.

=== Education ===
Sewell co-sponsored the Student Non-Discrimination Act in 2013, which, if enacted, would have protected LGBT students from anti-gay bullying and discrimination in public schools. In 2019, she sponsored a bill, which passed, granting historically black colleges $70 million for capital improvements and to support their educational work. In 2025, she congratulated Veronica Pitts, a high school teacher in Selma, Alabama, on the House floor for winning the National Civics Teacher of the Year award presented by the Bill of Rights Institute. She stated, "Each year, only one teacher in the nation is selected to receive this prestigious honor, and I am thrilled that this year, the teacher hails from Alabama's 7th Congressional District."

=== Energy policy ===
Sewell opposes offshore drilling. She also opposes allowing the Environmental Protection Agency to regulate greenhouse gas emissions.

=== Foreign policy ===
Sewell supported President Obama's decisions on Afghanistan, citing "trust" of his policies. She was part of a bipartisan delegation that accompanied Nancy Pelosi on a two-day trip to Afghanistan in May 2012. While there, they spent time "with American service-members and meeting local officials to discuss security and women's issues." Sewell opposed removing armed forces from Afghanistan in 2011.

=== Government reform ===
Sewell co-sponsored the STOCK Act in 2011 and the DISCLOSE Act in 2012. The same year, she also co-sponsored the SIMPLE Voting Act, to require a minimum of 15 days of nationwide early voting.

=== Gun policy ===
In 2019, Sewell voted for the Bipartisan Background Checks Act of 2019, which required background checks for anyone seeking to buy a firearm.

=== Health care ===
Sewell voted for the Affordable Care Act (Obamacare). She supports Medicaid expansion and the use of incentives to encourage states to expand it. She is currently sponsoring bills to lower prescription drug costs, expand funding for rural hospitals, and support more health studies on African American health disparities. In March 2021, Sewell voted for the American Rescue Plan, which included $475 million in funding for Sewell's district, including support for vaccinations, city employee overtime pay, and hazard pay for COVID-19 response work.

=== Homeland security ===
Sewell supported extending the PATRIOT Act's wiretapping. She voted against funding to support Trump's wall.

=== Kay Ivey ===
When Alabama governor Kay Ivey shared that she had performed in a college skit in blackface, Sewell called Ivey's actions "reprehensible" and "deeply offensive", adding that "racism – in any of its forms – is never acceptable, not in the 1960s and not now."

=== Immigration ===
In January 2025, Sewell was one of 48 Democrats to have voted for the Laken Riley Act, which requires U.S. Immigration and Customs Enforcement to detain illegal immigrants charged with theft. She was one of seven House Democrats who had previously voted against the proposal in March 2024. Sewell later became one of 46 House Democrats who joined all Republicans to vote for a Senate-amended version of the bill.

=== Impeachments of Donald Trump ===
In both the first and second impeachments of Donald Trump, Sewell voted in favor of articles of impeachment against Trump, the only representative from Alabama to do so.

=== Rural funding ===
On December 9, 2025, Sewell voted in favor of the Secure Rural Schools Reauthorization Act of 2025. The act passed overwhelmingly in the chamber, passing in a vote of 399–5. The act extends federal payments to rural counties to support schools, roads, and local services.

== Electoral history ==
Electoral history of Terri Sewell
Year	Office	Party	Primary						General			Result	Swing	Ref.
Year	Office	Party	Total	%	P.	Runoff	%	P.	Total	%	P.	Result	Swing	Ref.
2010	U.S. Representative	Democratic	31,531	36.80%	1st	32,366	55.00%	1st	136,696	72.48%	1st	Won	Hold	
2012	U.S. Representative	Democratic							232,520	75.85%	1st	Won	Hold	
2014	U.S. Representative	Democratic	74,953	83.91%	1st				133,687	98.37%	1st	Won	Hold	
2016	U.S. Representative	Democratic							229,330	98.41%	1st	Won	Hold	
2018	U.S. Representative	Democratic							185,010	97.80%	1st	Won	Hold	
2020	U.S. Representative	Democratic							225,742	97.16%	1st	Won	Hold	
2022	U.S. Representative	Democratic							123,233	63.54%	1st	Won	Hold	
2024	U.S. Representative	Democratic	59,143	92.6%	1st				186,723	63.68	1st	Won	Hold	

== Personal life ==
In 1998, Sewell married Theodore Dixie of Huntsville, Alabama. They are divorced. Sewell is a lifetime member of Brown Chapel AME Church in Selma, Alabama. She is the cousin of Briana Sewell, a delegate in the Virginia House of Delegates.

== See also ==
- List of African-American United States representatives
- Women in the United States House of Representatives

U.S. House of Representatives
Preceded by Artur Davis	Member of the U.S. House of Representatives from Alabama's 7th congressional district 2011–present	Incumbent
U.S. order of precedence (ceremonial)
Preceded by Austin Scott	United States representatives by seniority 89th	Succeeded by Daniel Webster
