= United States House Committee on House Administration =

Standing committee of the United States House of Representatives

House Administration Committee
Standing committee
- Active United States House of Representatives; 119th Congress

History
- Formed: January 2, 1947

Leadership
- Chair: Bryan Steil (R); Since January 13, 2023
- Ranking Member: Joseph Morelle (D); Since January 13, 2023

Structure
- Seats: 12 (12 currently filled) 8/8 4/4
- Political parties: Majority (8): Republican (8); Minority (4): Democratic (4)

Jurisdiction
- Senate counterpart: Committee on Rules and Administration

Subcommittees
- Elections; Modernization and Innovation

Meeting place
- 1309, Longworth House Office Building; Washington, D.C. 20515

Website
- cha.house.gov (Republican) democrats-cha.house.gov (Democratic)

Phone number
- (202)-225-8281

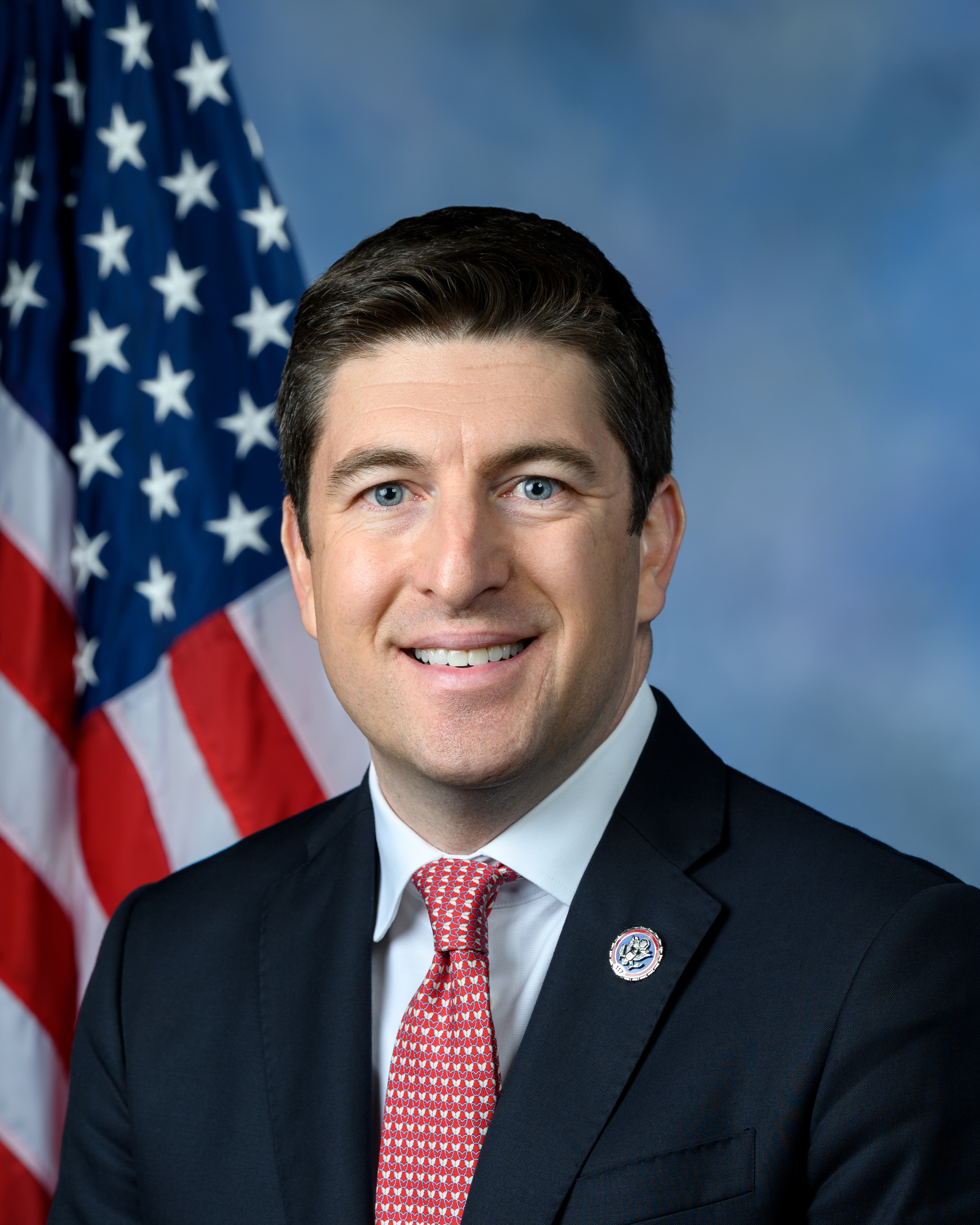
Committee Chair Bryan Steil

The United States House Committee on House Administration deals with the general administration matters of the United States House of Representatives, the security of the United States Capitol, and federal elections.

== History ==
The Committee on House Administration was created by the Legislative Reorganization Act of 1946, which merged the Committees on Enrolled Bills (created in 1789 as Joint Committee), Elections (created in 1794), Accounts (created in 1803), Printing (created in 1846), Disposition of Executive Papers (created in 1889), Memorials (created in 1929), and some functions of the Joint Committee on the Library (created in 1806 as a Joint Committee) into one new standing committee, the Committee on House Administration. (See National Archives's Records of the House Administration Committee and Its Predecessors)

In 1975 its responsibilities expanded to include oversight of parking facilities and campaign contributions to House candidates. In 1979, as part of the annual appropriations bill for the legislative branch, this committee absorbed the responsibilities of the former Select Committee on the Beauty Shop, which had been chaired by Rep. Yvonne Brathwaite Burke and was responsible for overseeing the operations of a beauty shop for House members, employees, and their families.

In 1995 its responsibilities expanded to include oversight of the Commission on Congressional Mailing Standards.

== Jurisdiction ==
The Committee on House Administration is a standing committee of the United States House of Representatives. The powers and duties of the Committee include the statutory responsibilities of the Committee on House Administration, as determined primarily by the Legislative Reorganization Acts of 1946 and 1970; the House of Representatives Administrative Reform Technical Corrections Act of 1996; and the Rules of the House of Representatives adopted on January 6, 1999.

The Committee on House Administration, which consists of 12 members, has jurisdiction over all legislation and other matters relating to the House of Representatives, such as:

- Appropriations from accounts (and the expenditure, auditing and settling thereof) for committee salaries and expenses, except for the Committee on Appropriations; House Information Resources; and allowances and expenses of Members, Delegates, the Resident Commissioner, Officers, and administrative offices of the House.
- Employment of persons by the House, including staff for Members, Delegates, the Resident Commissioner, and Committees; and reporters of debates.
- The Library of Congress, including management thereof.
- The House Library.
- Statuary and pictures.
- Acceptance or purchase of works of art for the Capitol.
- United States Botanic Garden.
- Purchase of books and manuscripts.
- The Smithsonian Institution and the incorporation of similar institutions .
- The Commission on Congressional Mailing Standards (Franking Commission).
- Printing and correction of the Congressional Record.
- Accounts of the House generally.
- Assignment of office space for Members, Delegates, the Resident Commissioner, and Committees.
- Disposition of useless executive papers.
- Election of the President, Vice President, Members, Senators, Delegates, or the Resident Commissioner; corrupt practices; contested elections; credentials and qualifications; and Federal elections generally.
- Services to the House, including House food services, parking facilities, and administration of the House Office Buildings and of the House wing of the Capitol.
- Travel of Members, Delegates, and the Resident Commissioner.
- Raising, reporting, and use of campaign contributions for candidates for office of Representative, of Delegate, and of Resident Commissioner.
- Compensation, retirement, and other benefits of the Members, Delegates, the Resident Commissioner, Officers, and employees of Congress.

Additionally, the Committee:

- Provides policy direction for the Inspector General and oversight of the Clerk, Sergeant at Arms, Chief Administrative Officer, and Inspector General.
- Has the function of accepting on behalf of the House of Representatives a gift, except as otherwise provided by law, if the gift does not involve a duty, burden, or condition, or is not made dependent on some future performance by the House; and promulgating regulations under which to do so.
- Is responsible for considering amounts of payments of funds resulting from settlements of complaints under the Congressional Accountability Act of 1995.
- Membership on the Joint Committee on Printing and the Joint Committee on the Library are drawn from House Administration along with Members from the Senate Committee on Rules and Administration. The Chair of the Appropriation Committee's Legislative Branch Subcommittee is also a member of the Joint Committee on the Library.

== Members, 119th Congress ==
Majority	Minority
Bryan Steil, Wisconsin, Chair; Barry Loudermilk, Georgia; Morgan Griffith, Virginia; Greg Murphy, North Carolina; Stephanie Bice, Oklahoma; Mary Miller, Illinois; Mike Carey, Ohio; Laurel Lee, Florida, Vice Chair	Joseph Morelle, New York, Ranking Member; Terri Sewell, Alabama; Norma Torres, California; Julie Johnson, Texas

Resolutions electing members: H.Res. 54 (R), H.Res. 55 (D)

== Subcommittees ==
Due to its relatively small size, the House Administration Committee has not had subcommittees for most of its existence. For the 110th Congress, Chair Millinder-McDonald recommended the creation of two new subcommittees, on Elections and Oversight, which were approved by the full committee on February 16, 2007. However, in the 113th Congress, the committee abolished both subcommittees. The Elections Subcommittee was reconstituted for the 116th Congress.

For the 118th Congress:

Subcommittee	Chair	Ranking Member
Elections	Laurel Lee (R-FL)	Terri Sewell (D-AL)
Oversight	Barry Loudermilk (R-GA)	Norma Torres (D-CA)
Modernization	Stephanie Bice (R-OK)	Derek Kilmer (D-WA)

== Committee leadership ==
Chairs
Name	Party	State	Start	End
Karl LeCompte	Republican	Iowa	1947	1949
Mary Norton	Democratic	New Jersey	1949	1951
Thomas Stanley	Democratic	Virginia	1951	1953
Karl LeCompte	Republican	Iowa	1953	1955
Omar Burleson	Democratic	Texas	1955	1968
Samuel Friedel	Democratic	Maryland	1968	1971
Wayne Hays	Democratic	Ohio	1971	1976
Frank Thompson	Democratic	New Jersey	1976	1980
Lucien Nedzi	Democratic	Michigan	1980	1981
Augustus Hawkins	Democratic	California	1981	1984
Frank Annunzio	Democratic	Illinois	1984	1991
Charlie Rose	Democratic	North Carolina	1991	1995
Bill Thomas	Republican	California	1995	2001
Bob Ney	Republican	Ohio	2001	2006
Vern Ehlers	Republican	Michigan	2006	2007
Juanita Millender-McDonald	Democratic	California	2007	
Bob Brady	Democratic	Pennsylvania	2007	2011
Dan Lungren	Republican	California	2011	2013
Candice Miller	Republican	Michigan	2013	2016
Gregg Harper	Republican	Mississippi	2017	2019
Zoe Lofgren	Democratic	California	2019	2023
Bryan Steil	Republican	Wisconsin	2023	present

Ranking members
Name	Party	State	Start	End
Mary Norton	Democratic	New Jersey	1947	1949
Karl LeCompte	Republican	Iowa	1949	1953
Thomas Stanley	Democratic	Virginia	1953	
Omar Burleson	Democratic	Texas	1953	1955
Karl LeCompte	Republican	Iowa	1955	1959
Paul Schenck	Republican	Ohio	1959	1965
Glenard Lipscomb	Republican	California	1965	1971
Samuel Devine	Republican	Ohio	1971	1975
William Dickinson	Republican	Alabama	1975	1981
Bill Frenzel	Republican	Minnesota	1981	1991
Bill Thomas	Republican	California	1991	1995
Vic Fazio	Democratic	California	1995	1997
Sam Gejdenson	Democratic	Connecticut	1997	1999
Steny Hoyer	Democratic	Maryland	1999	2003
John Larson	Democratic	Connecticut	2003	2005
Juanita Millender-McDonald	Democratic	California	2005	2007
Vern Ehlers	Republican	Michigan	2007	2009
Dan Lungren	Republican	California	2009	2011
Bob Brady	Democratic	Pennsylvania	2011	2019
Rodney Davis	Republican	Illinois	2019	2023
Joe Morelle	Democratic	New York	2023	present

== Historical membership rosters ==
=== 118th Congress ===
Majority	Minority
Bryan Steil, Wisconsin, Chair; Barry Loudermilk, Georgia; Morgan Griffith, Virginia; Greg Murphy, North Carolina; Stephanie Bice, Oklahoma; Mike Carey, Ohio; Laurel Lee, Florida; Anthony D'Esposito, New York	Joseph Morelle, New York, Ranking Member; Terri Sewell, Alabama; Derek Kilmer, Washington; Norma Torres, California

Resolutions electing members: H.Res. 56 (R), H.Res. 57 (D)

Subcommittees

Subcommittee	Chair	Ranking Member
Elections	Laurel Lee (R-FL)	Terri Sewell (D-AL)
Oversight	Barry Loudermilk (R-GA)	Norma Torres (D-CA)
Modernization	Stephanie Bice (R-OK)	Derek Kilmer (D-WA)

=== 117th Congress ===
Majority	Minority
Zoe Lofgren, California, Chair; Jamie Raskin, Maryland; G. K. Butterfield, North Carolina; Pete Aguilar, California; Mary Gay Scanlon, Pennsylvania, Vice Chair; Teresa Leger Fernandez, New Mexico	Rodney Davis, Illinois, Ranking Member; Barry Loudermilk, Georgia; Bryan Steil, Wisconsin

Resolutions electing members: H.Res. 9 (Chair), H.Res. 10 (Ranking Member), H.Res. 62 (D), H.Res. 63 (R)

Subcommittees

Subcommittee	Chair	Ranking Member
Elections	G. K. Butterfield (D-NC)	Bryan Steil (R-WI)

=== 116th Congress ===
Majority	Minority
Zoe Lofgren, California, Chair; Jamie Raskin, Maryland, Vice Chair; Susan Davis, California; G. K. Butterfield, North Carolina; Marcia Fudge, Ohio; Pete Aguilar, California	Rodney Davis, Illinois, Ranking Member; Mark Walker, North Carolina, Vice Ranking Member; Barry Loudermilk, Georgia

Sources: H.Res. 31 (Chair), H.Res. 32 (Ranking Member), H.Res. 85 (D), H.Res. 103 (R)

Subcommittees

Subcommittee	Chair	Ranking Member
Elections	Marcia Fudge (D-OH)	Rodney Davis (R-IL)

Commission on Congressional Mailing Standards (Franking Commission)

Majority	Minority
Susan Davis, California, Chair; Brad Sherman, California; Deb Haaland, New Mexico	Bryan Steil, Wisconsin, Ranking Member; Bob Latta, Ohio; Mark Walker, North Carolina

=== 115th Congress ===
Majority	Minority
Gregg Harper, Mississippi, Chair; Rodney Davis, Illinois, Vice Chair; Barbara Comstock, Virginia; Mark Walker, North Carolina; Adrian Smith, Nebraska; Barry Loudermilk, Georgia	Bob Brady Pennsylvania, Ranking Member; Zoe Lofgren, California; Jamie Raskin, Maryland

== See also ==
- List of United States House of Representatives committees
