= United States House Administration Subcommittee on Oversight =

The House Administration Subcommittee on Oversight is a subcommittee within the House Committee on House Administration. Extant during various Congresses, the subcommittee was referred to as the Subcommittee on Capitol Security during the 112th Congress and the 113th Congress. The Subcommittee on Oversight was most recently established for the 118th Congress.

== Jurisdiction ==
From the subcommittee's website:

Jurisdiction: Matters relating to congressional security, accountability of the legislative branch security and safety apparatus, legislative branch operations, and such other matters as may be referred to the subcommittee.

== Members, 118th Congress ==
Majority	Minority
Barry Loudermilk, Georgia, Chair; Morgan Griffith, Virginia; Greg Murphy, North Carolina; Anthony D'Esposito, New York	Norma Torres, California, Ranking Member; Derek Kilmer, Washington

== Historical membership rosters ==
=== 112th Congress ===
Majority	Minority
Phil Gingrey, Georgia, Chair; Aaron Schock, Illinois; Rich Nugent, Florida; Todd Rokita, Indiana	Zoe Lofgren, California, Ranking Member; Charlie Gonzalez, Texas
