= Barry Loudermilk =

American politician (born 1963)

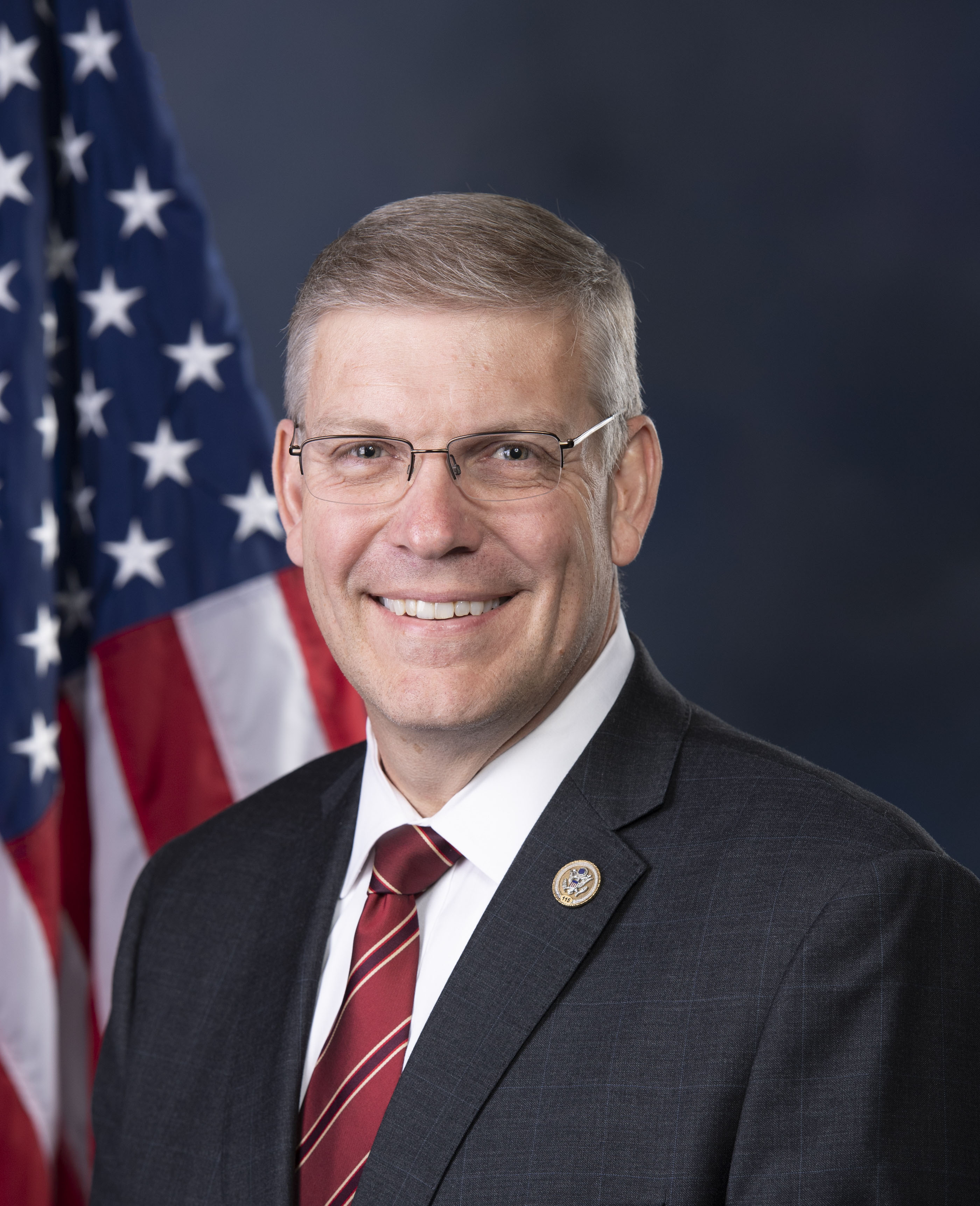
- Official portrait, 2018

Member of the U.S. House of Representatives from Georgia's 11th district
- Incumbent
- Assumed office January 3, 2015
- Preceded by: Phil Gingrey

Member of the Georgia State Senate
- In office January 10, 2011 – August 27, 2013
- Preceded by: Preston Smith
- Succeeded by: Bruce Thompson
- Constituency: 52nd district (2011–2013); 14th district (2013)

Member of the Georgia House of Representatives from the 14th district
- In office January 10, 2005 – January 10, 2011
- Preceded by: Tom Knox
- Succeeded by: Christian A. Coomer

Personal details
- Born: Barry Dean Loudermilk; December 22, 1963 (age 62) Riverdale, Georgia, U.S.
- Party: Republican
- Spouse: Desiree
- Children: 3
- Education: Air University (AS); Wayland Baptist University (BS)
- Website: House website Campaign website

Military service
- Branch/service: United States Air Force
- Years of service: 1984–1992
- Rank: Communications operations specialist
- Loudermilk's voice Loudermilk on the retirement of U.S. Sen. Johnny Isakson. Recorded November 19, 2019

Barry Dean Loudermilk (/ˈlaʊdərˌmɪlk/ LOW-dər-MILK; born December 22, 1963) is an American politician from the state of Georgia who has been the United States House representative from Georgia's 11th congressional district since 2015. Prior to this, Loudermilk served in the Georgia House of Representatives (2005–2010) and the Georgia Senate (2011–2013). Loudermilk stepped down from the Georgia Senate to run for Phil Gingrey's congressional seat in the 11th district. (Note: Gingrey ran for a U.S. Senate seat.)

Loudermilk won the Republican nomination for the House seat in a 2014 runoff against Bob Barr. In that race, The Almanac of American Politics stated Loudermilk took a "sharp anti-establishment turn." After a couple years of being in the U.S. House of Representatives, Loudermilk dropped his membership in the "anti-leadership" Freedom Caucus and became increasingly involved in the "more leadership oriented Republican Study Committee."

Georgia's 11th congressional district is located northwest of Atlanta and is Republican-favoring. The 2025 Cook Partisan Voting Index rated the district as favoring Republicans by 12 points. The Almanac has stated that a Democrat with a strong base in populous Cobb County could result in a competitive race. From 2014 to present, Loudermilk has been re-elected to successive biennial terms. In early 2026, Loudermilk announced he would not seek re-election in later that year.

== Early career ==
Loudermilk enlisted in the United States Air Force in 1984, where he worked as a communications operations specialist. While in the Air Force, he attended the Community College of the Air Force at Air University to earn his Associate of Applied Science in telecommunications technology in 1987 before going on to earn his Bachelor of Science in occupational education and information systems technology from Wayland Baptist University in 1992. He was honorably discharged from the Air Force in 1992. After his military service he founded a company called Innovative Network Systems, Inc.

== Georgia politics ==
Loudermilk was elected chairman of the Bartow County Republican party in 2001, serving until 2004. He served in the Georgia House of Representatives for District 14 from 2005 until 2010 and was a member of the Georgia State Senate from 2011 to 2013. As a representative, in 2007 he argued for the abolition of red-light cameras because the cameras do not conduct an "investigation", as officers do, to see who was driving the vehicle. Instead, cameras cite the vehicle, and it is up to an individual to prove their innocence. As a senator, Loudermilk supported a ban on undocumented students from attending the top 5 public state universities, and he argued to expand the ban to include all state colleges. Loudermilk resigned from the state senate in August 2013 to focus on a US congressional bid. The bid was for the house seat of Phil Gingrey, who ran for a U.S. Senate seat.

== U.S. House of Representatives ==
In the 2014 Republican primary for Georgia's 11th district, Loudermilk took a "sharp anti establishment turn" and argued that Bob Barr's experience in Washington was a drawback. Loudermilk was described as being the favorite of local tea party groups and having the support of Washington-based figures with a history of endorsing anti-establishment conservative politicians. Barr's surrogates argued that Loudermilk consistently embellished his military record.

Greg Bluestein, writing in The Atlanta Journal-Constitution, said that in the Air Force, Loudermilk rose "to the rank of staff sergeant, the candidate has told us. While in campaign speeches he speaks of his experience as an 'aviator,' Loudermilk says his flying experience has been as a civilian. He obtained a pilot’s license in 2008. And that picture of Loudermilk in an Air Force jumpsuit in a small plane? He was a spotter for search-and-rescue missions." In response to press requests and Barr's surrogates, Loudermilk released a military resume and his discharge paperwork.

In the primary, Loudermilk topped Barr and won easily against him in the runoff. Loudermilk ran unopposed in the November election. Once in office that November, he cast a "principled vote" (one of only three) against John Boehner as Speaker of the House, which he thought likely cost him a desired committee assignment. The Almanac of American Politics wrote that "after this initial dustup, Loudermilk moved closer to Republican leaders, despite criticism from right-wing talk radio hosts. In 2017, he dropped his membership in the anti leadership Freedom Caucus, citing a lack of time, while increasing his activity with the more leadership oriented Republican Study Committee."

As of December 2024, Loudermilk was serving as chairman of the House Administration Subcommittee on Oversight. In this position, he spearheaded a report targeting Liz Cheney over her role in the January 6th Committee. In January 2025, Loudermilk became the chair of a House Judiciary Committee subcommittee formed by Speaker Johnson that was intended to cast doubt on the work of the January 6th Committee.

=== District ===
The lines of the 11th Congressional district of Georgia were last updated as of January 3, 2025, after a court-ordered redrawing. The district is located to the northwest of Atlanta. As of 2025, the 11th district includes Marietta, the largest city and county seat of populous Cobb County; cities along the I-575 corridor including Woodstock, Holly Springs, and Canton (the county seat of Cherokee County); parts of Acworth and Kennesaw; and other cities along I-75 north of Atlanta including Emerson, Cartersville (the county seat of Bartow County), Adairsville, and Calhoun (the county seat of Gordon County). The district is Republican-favoring. Given district lines before the 2025 redraw, The Almanac of American Politics said that "recent results suggest that a Democrat with a strong base in Cobb County could give Loudermilk a serious run," given its large population base. The 2025 Cook Partisan Voting Index rates the district as favoring Republicans by 12 points.

=== Tenure ===
In the 114th congress, Loudermilk had an 84% score from conservative political advocacy group Heritage Action for his voting record, with the average House Republican scoring 63%.

In February 2017, Loudermilk co-sponsored H.R. 861, which would eliminate the U.S. Environmental Protection Agency by 2018.

As mentioned above, Loudermilk is a former member of the Freedom Caucus and has been endorsed by the evangelical author and political activist for Christian nationalist causes, David Barton.

=== Committee assignments ===
For the 118th Congress:

- Committee on Financial Services
  - Subcommittee on Financial Institutions and Monetary Policy
  - Subcommittee on National Security, Illicit Finance and International Financial Institutions
- Committee on House Administration
  - Subcommittee on Elections
  - Subcommittee on Oversight (Chair)

=== Caucus memberships ===
- Republican Study Committee
- U.S.–Japan Caucus
- Congressional Coalition on Adoption
- Congressional Motorcycle Caucus
- Congressional Taiwan Caucus

=== Allegations of aiding the January 6 United States Capitol attack ===
On May 19, 2022, the United States House Select Committee on the January 6 Attack requested that Loudermilk appear for an interview about a tour he led of the United States Capitol Complex on January 5, 2021, the day before the 2021 United States Capitol attack. House Democrats had suggested Loudermilk aided in the attack, which he and House Republicans disputed. In June, Capitol police concluded that there was nothing suspicious about Loudermilk's tour. Capitol police chief Tom Manger said, "There is no evidence that Rep. Loudermilk entered the U.S. Capitol with this group on January 5, 2021." The next day, the committee released video of Loudermilk leading the tour of the Capitol complex on January 5 in areas "not typically of interest to tourists, including hallways, staircases, and security checkpoints"; the footage showed the group walking through tunnels underneath the Capitol, but not within the main building. A man in the tour group can also be seen taking photos of hallways. The committee then shared footage claiming the man was at the riot, showing footage of a man at the storming of the Capitol the next day.

Loudermilk filed an ethics complaint against Representative Mikie Sherrill and other members for alleging he gave a reconnaissance tour of the Capitol on January 5.

== Political positions ==
=== Health care ===
Loudermilk supports reforming Medicaid, Medicare, and Social Security. He supports repealing and replacing the Affordable Care Act ("Obamacare"). He compared the 2017 Republican efforts to repeal Obamacare to the American Revolutionary War and World War II.

=== Donald Trump ===
Loudermilk said he considers the presidency of Donald Trump a "movement" and has praised the concept of "Make America Great Again." He has credited Paul Ryan, rather than Trump, with Republican success in Congress. In 2017, Loudermilk called Ryan a "revolutionary thinker."

In December 2019, Loudermilk likened the impeachment of Trump to the crucifixion of Jesus. In a floor speech, he said, "When Jesus was falsely accused of treason, Pontius Pilate gave Jesus the opportunity to face his accusers... During that sham trial, Pontius Pilate afforded more rights to Jesus than the Democrats have afforded this president in this process", a fact pattern disputed by religious scholarship and rated by PolitiFact as "false."

In December 2020, Loudermilk was one of 126 Republican members of the House of Representatives to sign an amicus brief in support of Texas v. Pennsylvania, a lawsuit filed at the United States Supreme Court contesting the results of the 2020 presidential election, in which Joe Biden defeated Trump. The Supreme Court declined to hear the case on the basis that Texas lacked standing under Article III of the Constitution to challenge the results of an election held by another state.

Given the refusal to accept the 2020 election loss of Donald Trump by allies and supporters, Loudermilk voted to reject the results in both Arizona and Pennsylvania immediately after the January 6th Capitol attack. He was one of 139 Republican House members who objected to certifying Biden as president.

=== Financial and economic issues ===
In 2016, the Club for Growth named Loudermilk a "defender of economic freedom" for his conservative voting record on the economy.

Loudermilk opposes the regulation of buy now, pay later financing.

Loudermilk supports a balanced budget amendment but does not consider it "politically viable."

Loudermilk supports tax reform and voted for the Tax Cuts and Jobs Act of 2017. He called the act a "big Christmas present" for his constituents, claiming it would reduce the deficit, improve the lives of all Americans, and cause more companies to hire due to increased revenues. He said, "I could understand it if all we were doing was just giving a corporate tax break—you could make that argument. But the bulk of the tax reform is giving middle-income Americans a significant tax cut."

Loudermilk supports dismantling the IRS and establishing a flat tax system.

==== Equifax ====
In September 2017, the Georgia-based credit bureau Equifax revealed a data breach that affected 143 million Americans and was characterized by technology journalists as "very possibly the worst leak of personal info ever to have happened". Four months earlier, Loudermilk, who had received $2,000 in campaign contributions from Equifax as part of an extensive lobbying effort, introduced a bill that would reduce consumer protections in relation to the nation's credit bureaus, including capping potential damages in a class action suit to $500,000 regardless of class size or amount of loss. The bill would also eliminate all punitive damages. After criticism from consumer advocates, Loudermilk agreed to delay consideration of the bill "pending a full and complete investigation into the Equifax breach."

=== Foreign policy ===
Loudermilk argued in 2015 against negotiating the Iran nuclear deal. He cited Benjamin Netanyahu's perspective and argued Iran was a dangerous terrorist state—one that sought regional if not global hegemony. He was a Committee on Homeland Security and task force member for the bipartisan 2015 Final Report of the Task Force on Combating Terrorist and Foreign Fighter Travel.

=== Abortion ===
Loudermilk is anti-abortion and believes that life starts at conception. He supports the right to life movement and has said, "Life is the ultimate right endowed by God and it is the responsibility of governments to protect that right, not to destroy it."

=== LGBT rights ===
Loudermilk opposes federal legalization of same-sex marriage, believing it should be decided by states. In 2015, Loudermilk condemned the Supreme Court decision in Obergefell v. Hodges, which held that same-sex marriage bans violated the constitution. He has supported the First Amendment Defense Act.

== Personal life ==
Loudermilk's wife is named Desiree. He has three adult children (Travis, Christiana, and Michael)—who were homeschooled and mostly not vaccinated —and 7 grandchildren as of 2024. Christiana was commended with a 2011 Georgia Senate resolution about her accomplishments in the Civil Air Patrol. Travis, who has worked for Marjorie Taylor Greene, has three children from his relationship with Sarah Redwine.

Loudermilk is a Baptist and has spoken of his attendance to Oakland Heights Baptist Church in Cartersville, GA.

He was "standing near home plate" when the 2017 Congressional baseball shooting began, in which he was uninjured. In response to the shooting, Loudermilk said his assistants in Georgia were armed.

== Notes ==
U.S. House of Representatives
Preceded by Phil Gingrey	Member of the U.S. House of Representatives from Georgia's 11th congressional district 2015–present	Incumbent
U.S. order of precedence (ceremonial)
Preceded by Ted Lieu	United States representatives by seniority 138th	Succeeded by John Moolenaar
