= Richard Marable =

American politician (1949–2025)

Member of the Georgia State Senate from the 52nd district
- In office January 14, 1991 – January 13, 2003
- Preceded by: Ken Fuller
- Succeeded by: Preston Smith

Personal details
- Born: March 23, 1949 Rome, Georgia, U.S.
- Died: February 28, 2025 (aged 75) Rome, Georgia, U.S.
- Party: Democratic

Richard Marable (March 23, 1949 – February 28, 2025) was an American politician who served in the Georgia State Senate from the 52nd district from 1991 to 2003. He died on February 28, 2025, at the age of 75.
