= Frank Annunzio =

American politician (1915–2001)

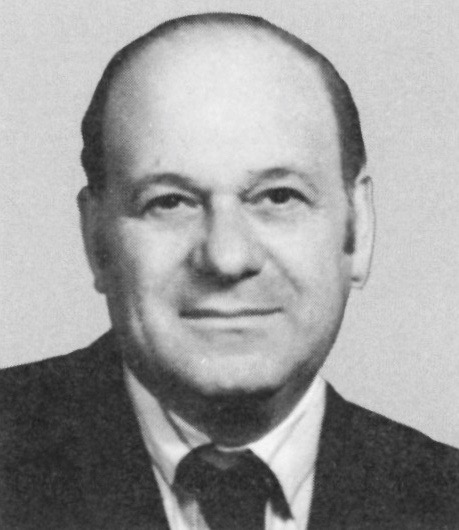

Member of the U.S. House of Representatives from Illinois
- In office January 3, 1965 – January 3, 1993
- Preceded by: Roland V. Libonati
- Succeeded by: Dan Rostenkowski (Redistricting)
- Constituency: 7th District (1965-1973); 11th District (1973-1993)

Chair of the House Administration Committee
- In office September 4, 1984 – January 3, 1993
- Preceded by: Augustus Hawkins
- Succeeded by: Charlie Rose

Personal details
- Born: January 12, 1915 Chicago, Illinois, U.S.
- Died: April 8, 2001 (aged 86) Chicago, Illinois, U.S.
- Party: Democratic
- Education: DePaul University
- Profession: teacher, labor leader

Frank Annunzio (January 12, 1915 – April 8, 2001) was an American politician from Chicago, Illinois.

== Early life and education ==
Annunzio, an Italian-American, was born in Chicago, where he remained for his entire childhood and much of his adult life. As a boy, he worked as a shoeshiner at the Hull House settlement. He attended Crane Technical High School and DePaul University.

== Career ==
Annunzio had careers as a high school teacher and labor leader of the United Steelworkers of America. Under governor Adlai Stevenson II, he served as the state's Secretary of Labor from 1949 to 1952.

In 1964, Annunzio was elected to the United States House of Representatives from a district in Chicago as a member of the United States Democratic Party. He was re-elected 13 times and served from 1965 to 1993, deciding not to run for reelection in 1992. He was chairman of several committees including the House Administration Committee during his later terms in congress, and was particularly notable for serving on a subcommittee for consumer affairs. In 1989, he urged people to burn credit cards in order to drive down interest rates and stop themselves from going into debt.

== Personal life ==
Annunzio died in 2001 in Chicago from complications arising from Parkinson's disease and was interred in the Queen of Heaven Cemetery.

U.S. House of Representatives
Preceded by Roland V. Libonati	Member of the U.S. House of Representatives from Illinois's 7th congressional district 1965–1973	Succeeded by Cardiss Collins
Preceded by Roman Pucinski	Member of the U.S. House of Representatives from Illinois's 11th congressional district 1973–1993	Succeeded by George E. Sangmeister
Political offices
Preceded by Augustus Hawkins; California	Chairman of House Administration Committee; 1984–1991	Succeeded by Charlie Rose; North Carolina
