= Karl M. LeCompte =

American politician (1887–1972)

Karl Miles LeCompte
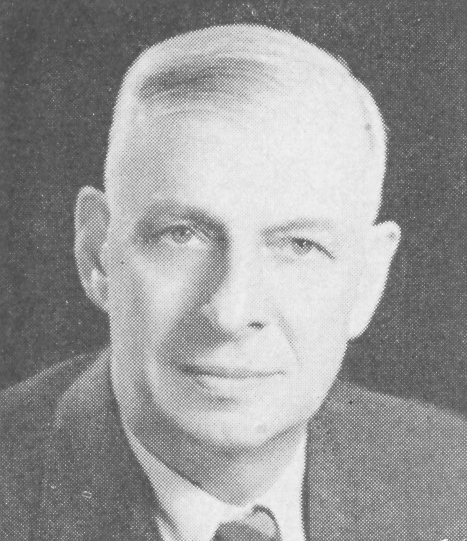
- Rep. Karl M. LeCompte, 1953 from Congressional Pictorial Directory

Member of the U.S. House of Representatives from Iowa
- In office January 3, 1939 – January 3, 1959
- Preceded by: Lloyd Thurston (5th); Henry O. Talle (4th)
- Succeeded by: Paul Cunningham (5th); Steven V. Carter (4th)
- Constituency: 5th district (1939-43); 4th district (1943-59)

Personal details
- Born: May 25, 1887 Corydon, Iowa, U.S.
- Died: September 30, 1972 (aged 85) Centerville, Iowa, U.S.
- Party: Republican
- Education: University of Iowa

Military service
- Allegiance: United States
- Battles/wars: World War I

Karl Miles LeCompte (May 25, 1887 – September 30, 1972) was a ten-term Republican U.S. Representative from south-central Iowa. He won ten consecutive races from 1938 to 1956, before choosing not to run again in 1958.

Born in Corydon, Iowa to Charles Francis and Hannah Miles LeCompte. LeCompte attended the public schools and graduated from the University of Iowa at Iowa City in 1909. One year later (in 1910) he became owner and publisher of the Corydon Times-Republican. In 1916, at age 29, he won election to the Iowa Senate, becoming its youngest member. In 1918, during the First World War he served as a private in the medical detachment of United States General Hospital No. 26, but did not serve overseas. His service in the Senate ended in 1921.

When Republican U.S. Representative Lloyd Thurston ran for the U.S. Senate in 1938, LeCompte ran for his seat in Iowa's 5th congressional district. In a successful bid for the Republican nomination in the primary, his advertisements stressed that he was "inalterably opposed to the New Deal Program of waste and extravagance." In the general election, he defeated Albia, Iowa Postmaster Ruth F. Hollingshead, the first woman to run for Congress in Iowa. In his first term, LeCompte served on the Committee on Public Lands and the Committee on Insular Affairs. He was re-elected to his 5th district seat in 1940, before redistricting in 1941 retitled the same set of counties as the 4th district. He was not seriously challenged until 1948, when Democratic attorney Steven V. Carter first ran against LeCompte, and came within 4,000 votes of unseating him. LeCompte easily prevailed in a rematch with Carter in 1950 and won two more terms after that, before Carter again came within 2,000 votes of unseating him in 1956. After that election, Carter challenged the result in the U.S. House, which decided two years later that LeCompte was properly declared the winner.

LeCompte served as chairman of the Committee on House Administration in the Eightieth Congress (from 1947 to 1948) and in the Eighty-third Congress (from 1953 to 1955).

He decided to retire in 1958, and Carter won the seat on his fourth attempt (but dying of cancer within a year). In all, LeCompte served in Congress between January 3, 1939, and January 3, 1959. He voted in favor of the Civil Rights Act of 1957.

After his last term in Congress, LeCompte returned to newspaper publishing. He later retired but continued as a contributing editor.

He died in Centerville, Iowa, on September 30, 1972. He was interred in Corydon Cemetery, Corydon, Iowa.

U.S. House of Representatives
Preceded by Lloyd Thurston	Member of the U.S. House of Representatives from Iowa's 5th congressional district 1939–1943	Succeeded by Paul Cunningham
Preceded by Henry O. Talle	Member of the U.S. House of Representatives from Iowa's 4th congressional district 1943–1959	Succeeded by Steven V. Carter
