= List of female top executives =

The world average of female top executives is 8 percent. Thailand has the highest proportion of female CEOs in the world, with 30 percent of companies employing female CEOs, followed by the People's Republic of China, with 19 percent. In the European Union the figure is 9 percent and in the United States it is 5 percent. In 2024, 10.4% of the CEOs at companies in the Fortune 500 were female.

== Female CEOs ==
- Brenda C. Barnes, former CEO of Sara Lee
- Jhane Barnes, owner fashion design company
- Mary Barra, chairman and CEO of General Motors
- Corie Barry, CEO of Best Buy
- Amanda Blanc, CEO of Aviva
- Ana Botín, president of Banco Santander, Spain
- Gail Koziara Boudreaux, CEO of Anthem
- Angela Braly, former president and CEO of WellPoint (now Anthem)
- Heather Bresch, Mylan Inc
- Roz Brewer, CEO of Walgreens
- Michele Buck, CEO and president of The Hershey Company
- Ursula Burns, CEO and chairman of Xerox
- Anne Chow, former CEO of AT&T Business
- Liz Claiborne, chairperson and CEO of Liz Claiborne, Inc.
- Alison Cooper, formerly CEO of Imperial Brands
- Debra Crew, CEO of Diageo
- Zoe Cruz, co-president of Morgan Stanley
- Margherita Della Valle, chief executive of Vodafone
- Mary Dillon, CEO of Ulta Beauty
- Patricia Dunn, former chairman of Hewlett-Packard
- Annika Falkengren, CEO of SEB, Sweden
- Kathryn Farmer, president and CEO of BNSF Railway
- Carly Fiorina, former chairman and CEO of Hewlett-Packard
- Janet Foutty, former CEO and chairperson of Deloitte Consulting
- Clara Furse, former CEO of London Stock Exchange
- Jody Gerson, CEO of Universal Music Publishing
- Jacqueline Gold, former CEO of Ann Summers
- Julie Greenwald, CEO of Atlantic Music Group
- Linda Hasenfratz, CEO of Linamar
- Kathy Ireland, chairman, CEO and chief designer for Kathy Ireland Worldwide and chairman emeritus for Level Brands
- Lisa S. Jones CEO of EyeMail Inc.
- Andrea Jung, chairman and CEO of Avon Products
- Indra Krishnamurthy Nooyi, president and CEO of PepsiCo
- Ida Liu CEO of HSBC Private Bank
- Karen S. Lynch, president and CEO of CVS Health
- Sylvia Rhone, CEO of Epic Records
- Ginni Rometty, former CEO of IBM
- Irene Rosenfeld, CEO of Kraft Foods
- Rasha Al Roumi, former CEO of Kuwait Airways
- Patricia Russo, CEO of Lucent
- Güler Sabancı , CEO of Sabancı Holding, Turkey
- Mary Sammons, president and CEO of Rite Aid
- Martha Stewart, former CEO of Martha Stewart Living Omnimedia
- Belinda Stronach, former president and CEO of Magna International
- Lisa Su, president, CEO and chair of AMD
- Cydni Tetro, CEO of Brandless
- Therese Tucker, founder and CEO of BlackLine
- Laura Wade-Gery, CEO of Multi-channel at Marks & Spencer, former CEO of Tesco.com
- Meg Whitman, former CEO of eBay, former CEO of Hewlett-Packard and Hewlett Packard Enterprise
- Geisha Williams, CEO and President of President of PG&E Corporation
- Shelley Zalis, CEO of The Female Quotient, former CEO of Ipsos Open Thinking Exchange
