= Lisa S. Jones =

American businesswoman and entrepreneur

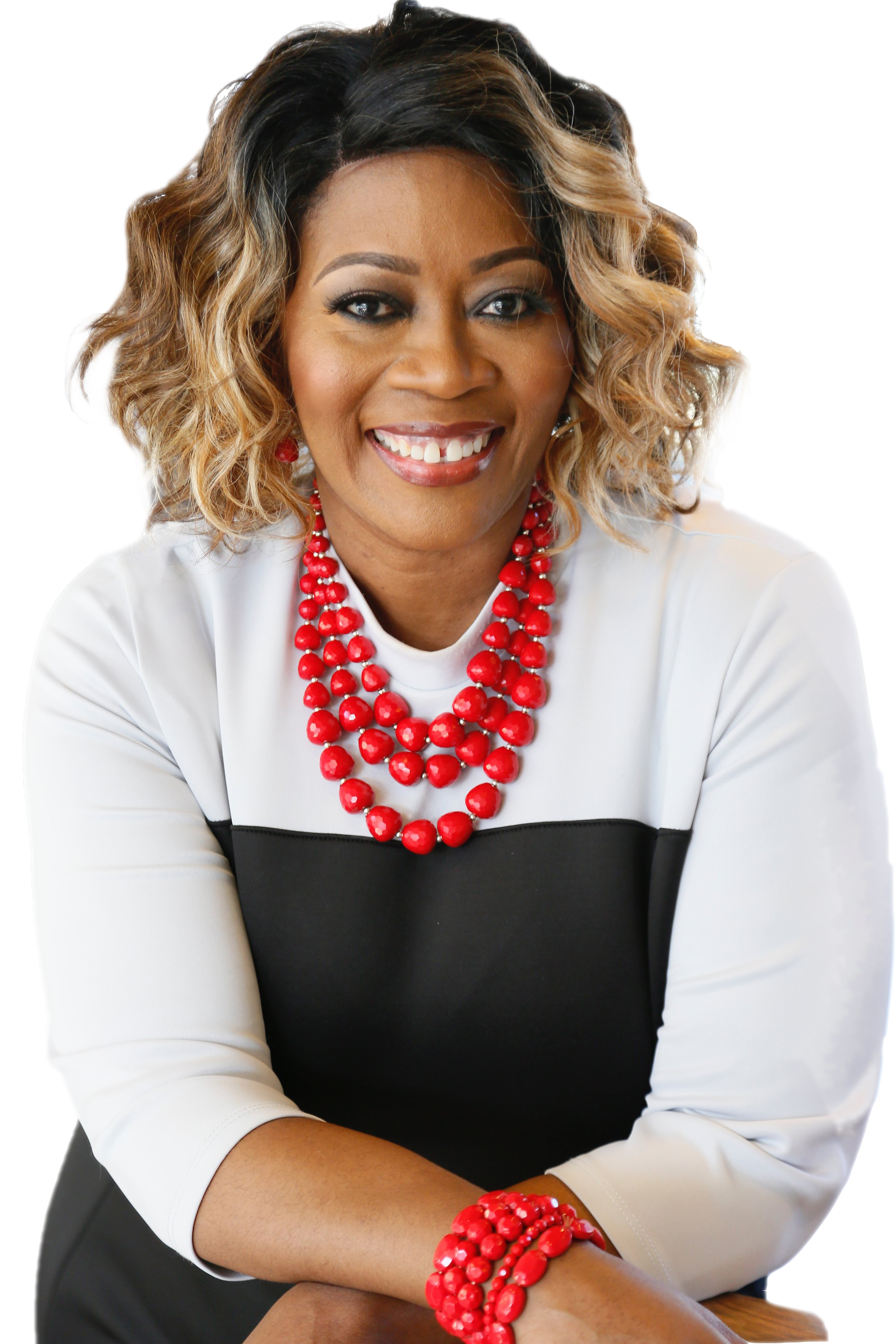
- Jones in 2018.
- Born: 1 April 1974 (age 52); Montgomery, Alabama, U.S.
- Education: Alabama A&M University (BBA, MBA); Tuck School of Business at Dartmouth; Harvard University
- Occupations: Businesswoman; entrepreneur; supplier diversity thought leader
- Years active: 2004–present
- Title: Founder and CEO of EyeMail Inc.

Lisa S. Jones (born 1 April 1974) is an American businesswoman and entrepreneur, best known for being the founder of Atlanta-based video email company EyeMail Inc. As both a black and woman-owned business, EyeMail Inc. is classified as a Minority Women Business Enterprise (MWBE). Her company began as a start-up, eventually growing exponentially through partnerships with Microsoft, Delta Air Lines, Time Warner, Porsche North America, the Atlanta Tech Village, PepsiCo and, most notably, The Coca-Cola Company, through which EyeMail Inc. was selected by Microsoft as a premier MWBE supplier in digital marketing. Prior to dedicating herself to entrepreneurship, Jones worked in supplier diversity for telecommunications provider AT&T, and continues to develop a career as a thought leader and public speaker in the matter.

In 2010, she received the "Most Innovative Company of the Year" prize at the Stevie Awards, and was also a finalist for Black Enterprise's "Innovator of the Year" award. More recently, she received the "Catalyst of the Year" award at Delta Air Lines' 2018 Star Awards ceremony, and was a finalist in Microsoft's 2022 Supplier Prestige Awards under the category of Diverse-Owned Supplier of the Year. In 2023, EyeMail Inc. entered Inc. magazine's annual list of the fastest-growing companies in the US Southeast region at number 181.

== Life and career ==
=== Early life and career beginnings (1974–2003) ===
Lisa S. Jones was born on 1 April 1974 in Montgomery, Alabama, in the Southeastern U.S., the youngest of three girls. Jones became interested in the world of entrepreneurship from an early age, finding inspiration in her father, who opened an ice cream shop from the ground up and "significantly [impacted] her life". As a teenager, she worked at McDonald's, where she "learned several fundamental business principles, including how much she loved interacting with costumers", as well as the "importance of developing interpersonal and communication skills". Jones is an Alabama A&M University alumna, where she earned a Bachelor of Business Administration in Logistics and Procurement, and MBA degrees. During her formative years, she also studied marketing management at the Tuck School of Business at Dartmouth.

While still living in Alabama, Jones was a logistics and supply chain expert at NASA's Marshall Space Flight Center, a work experience that lasted for four years, and she has cited as one of the reasons for wanting to develop a product that improves companies' internal communication. After being laid off from NASA, Jones decided to relocate to Atlanta, Georgia, where she expanded her career in supplier diversity for companies such as AT&T. Jones has stated that she decided to become an entrepreneur after her mother's unexpected death at age 61.

=== Foundation and growth of EyeMail Inc. (2004–2019) ===
Jones eventually set out to create a product to improve engagement marketing, coming up with an "email video" service that enables up to 60 seconds-long high-definition videos to be compressed and eimbedded directly into emails, avoiding the need to click on a link or access a browser to play them. She officially founded her company EyeMail Inc. in Atlanta in 2004, and developed the product for five years during her spare time, as she also had a full-time job as an executive in telecommunications. Also in 2004, Jones filed her first patent focused on video in email. Writing in 2022, Arizona-based magazine Success Knocks noted that "as an African American female in technology and from Alabama, she did not receive enough support, guidance, and open-door access as her colleagues." At first, Jones had difficulty finding support from American development agencies, so she tried several international technical teams until choosing a partnership that she considered most suitable. As part of EyeMail Inc.'s development process, Jones took part in Microsoft's Mentor/Protégé Innovation Lab Program, which "provided more support and expertise", as well as its Innovation Center, making her the first African-American woman to do so. In a special feature published by Microsoft in 2023, Jones recalled:

Soon after launching EyeMail, I attended a Microsoft conference on women in technology and began building the strong partnership we have now. We were later invited to receive Microsoft Technology Center support to collaborate with senior architects and developers as part of a Microsoft supplier diversity initiative to mentor best-in-class technology startups in Atlanta. Knowing that we had access to global thought leadership and support to develop our technical roadmap gave us an elevated sense of purpose and a lot of confidence to expand the company.

EyeMail Inc. got the interest of business executives after its use in a Georgia's Greater Women's Business Council (GWBC) campaign, to whom Jones offered to use her service for free in an effort to showcase her product. It first caught the attention of Time Warner, which became EyeMail Inc.'s first client. In 2008, EyeMail Inc. was listed at number 3 on the Atlanta Tribune's list for the "Top 8 Atlanta Businesses to Watch", and was selected as one of the Top 40 Innovative Companies by the Technology Association of Georgia (TAG). Also in 2008, Jones began a partnership with The Coca-Cola Company, as part of its mentor program with the Georgia Minority Supplier Diversity Council (GMSDC). Jones' relationship with The Coca-Cola Company, both as a client and partner, was pivotal to EyeMail Inc.'s growth, as it "gave her product more visibility and helped her develop business skills", and purportedly caused its revenue to quadruple. The company operates in several countries—including the United Kingdom, Canada, India, Pakistan and Mexico— and works for businesses such as Delta Air Lines, Major League Baseball, Porsche North America, Aetna, the Atlanta Braves, The Home Depot, and PepsiCo. In 2008, Jones was the winner of the first season of CBS reality competition show The Next Tycoon.

Jones is a board member of TAG, as well as a partner of the Billion Dollar Roundtable organization, where EyeMail Inc. is classified as a Minority Women Business Enterprise (MWBE) strategic partner. She took part as a panelist at the organization's 2014 Billion Dollar Summit. As a continuing part of her pre-entrepreneurial career, Jones continues to work as a supplier diversity thought leader and public speaker at specialized forums and panels. In 2010, Black Enterprise nominated Jones as a finalist for the "Innovator of the Year" award, and was also given the "Georgia Minority Technology Industry Award", as well as Indiana University's Madam C. J. Walker award for "Outstanding Business Achievement".

In 2013, Jones was a finalist in the 4th season of ABC's Shark Tank. In 2018, she received the "Catalyst of the Year" award at Delta Air Lines' Annual Star Awards ceremony. In 2019, Minority Business Entrepreneur magazine listed Jones in a special feature titled "Honoring WBEs Who Rock!". The same year, Jones was a finalist for the EY Entrepreneurial Winning Women prize awarded by Ernst & Young.

=== Recent years (2019–present) ===
Jones is a board member of the Technology Association of Georgia Diversity and Inclusion, and a volunteer at the local chapter of the Women in Technology Association. She is currently pursuing an executive degree at Harvard University. In 2020, she was chosen by PepsiCo as one of 15 participants in the Stacy's Rise Project, a mentorship program to support black women business owners. Also in 2020, Jones was selected by Stacy's Pita Chips for its Rise Project 2021, which is dedicated to "helping women grow their businesses through funding, mentorship, and community". As part of Stacy's Pita Chips project, Jones was added to a Female Founder Finder directory, which directs consumers to nearby female-founded businesses. She was also nominated for other prizes, including New World Report's North American Business Awards, Georgia Business Journal's Best of Georgia Awards, and the CTO of the Year award given by the Women in Tech Network.

In 2021, Jones was listed as one of the "Top 10 Businesswomen to Admire in 2021" by global business magazine CIO Look, and one of the "Top 30 Business Stars" by The Boss Network. As a Microsoft Mentor Protégé, Jones has collaborated with Senior Architects at Microsoft's Innovation Lab for EyeMail's technology roadmap, adding a closed captioning feature that allows "recipients to follow along with the words or captions, delivering enhanced engagement for over 430 million impacted by hearing loss."This new venture was done in collaboration with Senior Architects at Microsoft's Innovation Lab.

That year, EyeMail was listed as one of the "20 Innovative Companies Which Everyone Should Know in 2021" by the Atlanta-based Global Business Leaders Mag. Success Knocks' "10 Most Iconic Women in 2022", and The Atlantan Magazine's special feature on the top innovators from Atlanta. On April 23, 2022, Jones was a speaker at the "Women in Leadership Fireside chat" organized by the Harvard Graduate Council, presented as a "platform for exceptional women leaders to exchange views, advice and discuss our community's challenges." In May 2022, EyeMail Inc. was a finalist in Microsoft's Supplier Prestige Awards under the category of Diverse-Owned Supplier of the Year.

Also in 2022, Jones was a speaker on video-in-email at MailCon. She was also featured in Emailexpert's series of "speaker showcases", with writer Nely Bonar describing her as a "digital marketing maven and a star speaker, with a track record of helping companies of all sizes use video in email." In November 2022, she was included in Thinkers360's list of the "175 Women B2B Thought Leaders You Should Follow in 2023", as well as a finalist for Women in Tech Network's Global Awards. That year, EyeMail was also given the Corporate Excellence Award given by the Staffordshire-based publication Corporate Vision.

In early 2023, Jones was listed among the "finest email mavens" by Uplers. In May 2023, she was among the winners of the Enterprising Women of the Year Award. Also in May, Jones gave a speech titled "Taking a Leap of Faith to Pursue Your Dream" as part of the WIT Network. The following month, Jones was named one of the "Top 100 Women of the Future in Emerging Tech" by Women of the Future,

In June 2023, Susanna Ray of Microsoft used EyeMail Inc. as an example of "black-owned companies [that] are using corporate connections to give back". Ray stated that: "When Microsoft announced its Racial Equity Initiative in 2020 and set a goal to double the number of Black suppliers it does business with, a procurement engagement manager for the company remembered Jones and reached out, partnering with EyeMail to integrate video in email marketing communications as part of the Windows 11 launch in 2021." In the same article, Jones described her experience:

I started crying when I got my first contract with Microsoft, because I was full of gratitude. Everyone told me, "You're a woman, you're a Black woman, you're from Alabama, you don't have the right network, you're not a coder" — I could go on and on. But I said, "I am going to make it." So when I was awarded the Microsoft contract, and the supplier number, the whole process of onboarding was fabulous, and it was exhilarating. We have a lot of Fortune 500 customers on our roster now, and there are so many tangible and intangible benefits to this relationship that continue to evolve and show up.

Between 2021 and 2023, EyeMail has grown 71%, landing a spot on the Inc. list of fast-growing small companies in the US Southeast region for 2023. Microsoft noted in 2023 that the company also delivers managed services projects 40% faster, following the adoption of Microsoft 365 Business Premium. In October 2023, Jones was recognized as "Fearless Woman in Technology" by Women in Technology. She was also among 10 experts consulted by Uplers in a special report on the impacts of AI tools in email copywriting. Jones has also announced the upcoming launches of EyeMail Software as a Service (SaaS) Storytelling Platform, which also includes new products and features such as EyeCon, EyeViewer Assistant (EVA) and Video in Text. In November 2023, Jones and her company EyeMail Inc. were selected among the winners of Invest Connect, a pitch competition organized by the Technology Association of Georgia (TAG) as part of their Bridge Builders initiative, aimed to link black-owned businesses with investors.

== See also ==
- Lists of African Americans
- List of Alabama A&M people
- List of chief executive officers
- List of entrepreneurs
- List of female top executives
- List of Internet entrepreneurs
- List of people from Montgomery, Alabama
