= List of Alabama A&M people =

The following is a list of notable Alabama A&M University people, including alumni, notable faculty members and administrators, and others affiliated with the university.

== Education ==
Name	Class year	Notability	Reference(s)
Johnson O. Akinleye	1982	12th chancellor of North Carolina Central University	
Matthew W. Bullock	1968	College professor and administrator, lawyer, and American football player and coach	
Hadiyah-Nicole Green	2003	Tuskegee University professor, developing a cancer treatment involving lasers and nanoparticles	
Jack Thomas	1983	11th president of Western Illinois University	

== Public service and government ==
Name	Class year	Notability	Reference(s)
Mandela Barnes	2008	Politician, lieutenant governor of Wisconsin	
Don Calloway	2002	Politician, member of the Missouri House of Representatives from the 71st district	
Linda Coleman	1971	Member of the Alabama Senate, 20th district	
Clyde Foster	1954	Scientist, NASA Equal Opportunity Employment Officer	
Laura Hall		Politician, Alabama House of Representatives	
Shelia Nash-Stevenson	1981 (PhD 1994)	Integration engineer, NASA Marshall Space Flight Center; first African-American woman to earn a PhD in physics at the Alabama A&M University	
Ontario Tillman		Member of the Alabama House of Representatives	
Whiquitta Tobar	2012	Georgetown Law graduate, Zubrow Fellow in Children's Law at the Juvenile Law Center in Philadelphia; former college basketball player at Alabama A&M	
Miriam Witherspoon		Former member of the Birmingham City Council	

== Athletics ==
Name	Class year	Notability	Reference(s)
Johnny Baldwin	2006	Former National Football League player (Detroit Lions, Kansas City Chiefs, Washington Redskins)	
Howard Ballard	1987	Former National Football League player (2-time Pro-Bowler, 4-time Super Bowler)	
Mfana Futhi Bhembe	2008	Former soccer player for the Bulldogs who went on to play in soccer leagues in Swaziland and in Major League Soccer	
Desmond Cambridge	2002	All-time NCAA single season steals leader	
Jearl Miles Clark	1989	Gold medal Olympian; holds the American record in the women's 800 m at 1:56.40	
Ronnie Coleman	1974	Former National Football League player, running back for the Houston Oilers 1974–1981	
Mickell Gladness	2008	Former National Basketball Association player; only player in NCAA Division I history to record 15 blocks in a single game	
Brick Haley	1989	National Football League and college football defensive coach	
Jean Harbor	1986	Former soccer player for the Bulldogs who went on to play in various soccer leagues in Nigeria and the United States	
Willie Hayes	1989	Former AAMU basketball player and current head men's basketball coach	
Jamaal Johnson-Webb	2012	Former National Football League offensive lineman	
Cleon Jones		Former Major League Baseball player	
Frank Kearse	2011	Former National Football League defensive tackle	
Maurice Kemp		Basketball player in the Israeli Basketball Premier League	
Robert Mathis	2003	National Football League NFL Pro Bowl defensive end for Indianapolis Colts	
Nigel Moore	2003	Former college and professional basketball player	
Joe Patton	1994	National Football League, former Ttckle for the Washington Redskins	
L. Vann Pettaway	1980	Former men's head basketball coach	
Robert Prunty	1988	Cincinnati Bearcats football offensive coordinator	
Frank Sillmon	1989	Named one of the five greatest players in A&M program history by ESPN College Basketball Encyclopedia	
John Stallworth	1974 (MBA 1986)	National Football League Hall of Fame member, former Pittsburgh Steelers player; four-time Super Bowl champion; four-time Pro-Bowler; founded government contracting firm, Madison Research in 1986	
Obie Trotter	2006	International professional basketball player and 2006 NCAA season steals leader	
Barry Wagner	1989	Former Arena Football League player	
Mike Williams	1982	Former National Football League player	
Dannette Young-Stone	1986	Former track athlete, won U.S. Olympic gold and silver medals in the 4 X 100 relay in 1988 and 1992	

== Civil rights ==
Name	Class year	Notability	Reference(s)
Barbara Ann Posey Jones		Teen spokesperson during the Oklahoma City lunch counter sit-ins of 1958-1959 who later became professor of Economics and dean of the College of Business at AAMU	
Vivian Malone Jones	1963	Received a bachelor's degree in business education from AAMU before being blocked from enrolling at the University of Alabama	
Joseph Lowery	Attended	Minister and leader during the civil rights movement	

== Religion ==
Name	Class year	Notability	Reference(s)
Sylvester Croom, Sr.		Minister and community leader in Tuscaloosa, Alabama; father of first African-American SEC head football coach Sylvester Croom Jr.; former AAMU football player	

== Art and media ==
Name	Class year	Notability	Reference(s)
Bama Boyz	Attended	Music producers	
Michael Crooms	Attended	Music producer	
Henry Panion	Attended	Composer, arranger, conductor, educator, and professor in the department of music at the University of Alabama at Birmingham	
Sun Ra	Attended	Jazz musician	
Ruben Studdard	2015	American Idol season 2 winner	
W. C. Handy	Attended	jazz artists	

== Other ==
Name	Class year	Notability	Reference(s)
Lisa S. Jones	Attended	Businesswoman and entrepreneur	

== Notable faculty, staff and coaches ==
- Charles Henry Chapman - one of the founders of Alpha Phi Alpha; professor of agriculture at Alabama A&M
- Ron Cooper - former head football coach, 1998–2001
- William Hooper Councill - former slave and the first president of Huntsville Normal School, which is today Alabama Agricultural and Mechanical University
- Ray Greene - former head football coach, 1979–1983, 1986–1988.
- Ben Jobe - former Alabama A&M Bulldogs basketball head coach 1982–1986
- Anthony Jones - former head football coach, 2002–2013; second winningest football coach in program history
- Harriet Josephine Terry - one of the founders of Alpha Kappa Alpha; taught English at Alabama A&M for 37 years
- Constance Jordan Wilson - urban planner, on faculty of AAMU 1979–2019
