= Supplier diversity =

Supplier diversity refers to the use of minority-owned businesses as suppliers, and a supplier diversity program is a proactive business program which encourages such use within an organisation's supply chain. Minority-owned includes black and minority ethnic business ownership, women owned, veteran owned, LGBT-owned, service disabled veteran owned, historically underutilized business, and Small Business Administration (SBA)-defined small business concerns. The Hackett Group refers to "approximately 16 categories" covering various aspects of supplier diversity. It is not directly correlated with supply chain diversification, although utilizing more vendors may enhance supply chain diversification. Supplier diversity programs recognize that sourcing products and services from previously under-used suppliers helps to sustain and progressively transform a company's supply chain, thus quantitatively reflecting the demographics of the community in which it operates by recording transactions with diverse suppliers.

== United States ==
Paul D. Larson links the establishment of supplier diversity concerns to the American civil rights movement in the 1960s.

Diverse- and women-owned business enterprises are among the fastest-growing segments of the U.S. economy. Diverse-owned businesses generated an estimated $495 billion in annual revenue in 1997 and employed nearly 4 million workers, while women-owned firms employed about 19 million people and generated $2.5 trillion in annual sales.

Alongside the Women-Owned Small Business Program, the US Small Business Administration also operates an Economically Disadvantaged Women Owned Small Business (EDWOSBs) program for preferential award of federal contracts in certain industries. A wider categorization including women, minority, disabled veteran, and/or LGBT business enterprises (WMDVLGBTBE) is referenced in Californian supplier diversity requirements.

The Hackett Group, in their 2019 study of supplier diversity, found that US companies increasingly adopt supplier diversity programmes to achieve objectives associated with reputation management, their own corporate diversity culture and investment in their local communities, rather than reasons connected with legal compliance, and there are a growing number of companies who aim to extend supplier diversity within their tier 1 supply chain but also set expectations for tier 2 supply chain engagement activities to include supplier diversity language.

=== Practices at state level ===
Certain states within the United States, as a part of their bidding process, incentivize Minority Business Enterprises (MBEs) and women-owned business enterprises (WBEs) to bid for publicly awarded construction or service contracts. They may also declare that a percentage of the work performed on a contract be awarded to an MBE or WBE.

In New York State, a goal was set in 2014 for the award of public contracts to women and minority businesses to increase from 20% in 2014 to 30% by 2019. When the target was increased, the Association of General Contractors (AGC) sued the state for failing to release documents via New York's Freedom of Information Law (FOIL). The AGC was concerned that the state had not conducted a proper contract analysis before declaring the increase of the MWBE goal to 30%. The AGC stated that the 30% goal did not reflect the availability of MWBEs statewide. The AGC also questioned a later study - performed by Mason Tillman Associates Ltd. of Oakland, California - which was paid for by the state in consideration of its employment goals for state contracts.

In 2018, the state was also considering establishing goals for the workforce of contractors awarded public contracts, but insisted these goals were not quotas. If contractors could not make a "good faith" effort to reach the goals, contractors might not be eligible for future public contracts for a length determined by the state.

There have been cases where contractors have been charged with crimes for impersonating MBEs. In New York in 2018, Eastern Building & Restoration was charged for fraudulently receiving over $1 million from public construction contracts by representing itself as an MBE during the years 2012 - 2014.

California's Public Utilities Commission requires public utility companies and prime contractors to monitor and report on supplier diversity in accordance with its General Order 156 (GO 156), first adopted in 1988. The supplier information underlying this reporting requirement is maintained by the Supplier Clearinghouse, a Commission-supervised body created under GO 156.

== Canada ==
In Canada, supplier diversity is supported and facilitated by five councils:

- Canadian Aboriginal and Minority Supplier Council
- Canadian Council for Aboriginal Business
- Canadian Gay and Lesbian Chamber of Commerce
- Inclusive Workplace and Supply Council of Canada
- Women Business Enterprises Canada Council

The Supplier Diversity Alliance Canada, formed in 2016, draws together the work of these councils (although the Canadian Council for Aboriginal Business is not directly involved in the alliance).

== New Zealand ==
Supplier diversity initiatives in New Zealand are aimed in particular at engaging with Pasifika businesses.

== Europe ==
A "Handbook on Supplier Diversity" published by the European Commission in 2009 made "a strong case for supplier diversity" in the European Union, acknowledging that "Europe is still at the beginning of its journey towards supplier diversity". The handbook was supported by Supplier Diversity Europe, a business-led initiative which at that time operated in the UK, France and Germany, along with the Migration Policy Group and the Economic and Social Research Council. The slower pace in adopting supplier diversity programmes in Europe, compared to the United States, was also acknowledged at the World Economic Forum in 2020.

== See also ==
- Procurement outsourcing
- Procurement
- Strategic sourcing
- Supplier relationship management
- U.S. Women's Chamber of Commerce
- National LGBT Chamber of Commerce
- Disadvantaged business enterprise
- Black Economic Empowerment - policy in post-apartheid South Africa aiming to strengthen economic participation among non-white people, including through government procurement
