= Vmail =

Vmail may refer to:

- Voicemail, a system of managing telephone messages
- Video mail, a video message that is sent by email
- V-mail or Victory Mail, a mail system operated between United States troops serving abroad during World War II and the United States
