= Commonground/MGS =

Marketing communications agency

- Company type: Private; Minority Business Enterprise
- Industry: Integrated Marketing Communications (advertising, public relations, production)
- Founded: 2014
- Headquarters: New York, New York, U.S.
- Key people: Sherman Wright, CEO and Founder/Managing Partner
- Number of employees: 300+
- Website: commongroundmgs.com

Commonground/MGS (CGMGS) is an independent marketing communications agency in the United States. Headquartered in New York with offices in Miami, Chicago, Houston, and Los Angeles, the Minority Business Enterprise specializes in minority, multicultural, urban and youth markets.

== History ==
In 2014, eight independent agencies and companies - commonground, MGSCOMM, SWAY Public Relations, CG Works, Post Master and Run Wild Productions - came together under the umbrella of a holding group to form Commonground/MGS (CGMGS). The holding group houses five autonomous agencies/companies operating under their own name: CGMGS, CG Works, Post Master, Run Wild Productions and SWAY Public Relations led by Founding Partners Ahmad Islam, Al Garcia-Serra, Manuel E. Machado, and Sherman Wright.
