= Constance Wilson =

Constance Wilson may refer to:

- Constance K. Wilson (born 1959), politician from North Carolina
- Constance Wilson-Samuel (1908–1963), Canadian figure skater
- C. Anne Wilson, British food historian
- Constance Mary Wilson (later Constance Luard), British tennis player and two time Wimbledon finalist.
- Constance Wilson, actress in Fair Week and sister of actress Lois Wilson (actress)
- Constance Jordan Wilson, American college professor
