= List of companies of Georgia =

List of companies of Georgia may refer to:

- List of companies of Georgia (country)
- List of Georgia (U.S. state) companies
