= Apex Building Group =

American real estate developer

Apex Building Group, Inc.
- Type: Private
- Industry: Construction and real estate development
- Founder: Robert Horsford
- Headquarters: Yonkers, New York
- Key people: Robert Horsford (president and chairman); Lee Brathwaite (CEO)
- Website: apexbuilds.com

Apex Building Group, Inc. is a general contractor and real estate development company that was founded in Harlem (Manhattan) and is now based in Yonkers, New York, focusing on affordable housing and mixed-use properties in New York and the tri-state region. Apex Building Group, Inc. is a certified minority-owned business enterprise (MBE) that is led by Robert Horsford and Lee Brathwaite.

The firm was founded in 1997 by Horsford. It has added or preserved more than 4,700 units of affordable housing in New York and the tri-state region. A typical project includes residences that are affordable to lower income individuals and families, and some include housing designated for formerly homeless individuals.

== History ==
In the 1920s, Victor Horsford, grandfather of Robert Horsford, started a real estate business called Victor Horsford Realty in Harlem. Victor owned several multifamily rentals which formed the start of the family's real estate and affordable housing work in the City of New York. Apex Building Group was incorporated in 1997 by his grandson, Robert Horsford.

Apex was selected in 2017 to develop an affordable housing project in central Harlem. A 2019 project saw Apex renovating homes in East Baltimore, Maryland and Twin Parks West, New York.

In 2021, Apex completed development of Balton Commons, a Harlem building for mixed-income housing that was also launched with a technology startup incubator run by Silicon Harlem, which is geared toward STEM education for high schoolers.

In 2022, Apex broke ground on Alafia, a 576-unit affordable housing development in Brooklyn, on the former site of the Brooklyn Developmental Center. The project will add 11 acres of green space to its East New York neighborhood, and includes solar and geothermal elements.

Another 2022 project saw the construction of the offices of Brotherhood Sister Sol, a not-for-profit youth development organization for Black and Latinx youth. The project was noted by the New York Times for being a "complicated building... focus[ing] on Black and brown architects and developers."

A 2023 project to renovate housing for 2,900 residents selected Apex and two other firms to complete the work.

In 2024, the New York Department of Housing Preservation and Development chose Apex to convert an office building in Prospect Heights into 116 units of housing. The project is part of the "24 in 24" plan to develop affordable housing on underutilized publicly owned land. The same year, Apex was also selected as part of a consortium to renovate low-income housing in Harlem as part of the PACT program.
