= EyeMail =

American communications technology company

EyeMail Inc.
- EyeMail Inc. logo
- Type: Private
- Industry: Video email; online marketing
- Founded: 2004; 22 years ago
- Headquarters: Atlanta, Georgia, U.S.
- Area served: Worldwide
- Owner: Lisa S. Jones
- Website: eyemailinc.com

EyeMail Inc. is an American communications technology and digital marketing company based in Atlanta, Georgia. Founded by entrepreneur Lisa S. Jones, EyeMail Inc. is both a black and woman-owned business enterprise (WBE), and is an officially certified Minority Business Enterprise (MBE) by the NMSDC (National Minority Supplier Development Council).

The company is an "email video" provider, offering a technology that enables up to 60 seconds-long HD videos to be compressed and embedded directly into emails, avoiding the need to click on a link or access a browser to play them. Some of EyeMail Inc.'s chief clients include PepsiCo, Microsoft, Delta Air Lines, The Coca-Cola Company, Porsche North America, and Harvard Business School, although the company also partners with mid-tier and emerging brands, as well as nonprofit organizations. In 2023, EyeMail Inc. appeared on Inc. magazine's annual list of the fastest-growing companies in the US Southeast region at number 181.

== History ==
=== Origins and growth (2004–2014) ===
EyeMail Inc. was founded by Lisa S. Jones in 2004 and is headquartered in Atlanta, Georgia. Jones is originally from Montgomery, Alabama, and enrolled at the Alabama A&M University, university from which she received BBA and MBA degrees. She also studied marketing management at the Tuck School of Business at Dartmouth. Before becoming an entrepreneur, Jones worked as a logistics and supply chain expert at NASA, eventually relocating to Atlanta to expand her career in supplier diversity for companies such as AT&T. Jones has revealed that she founded EyeMail Inc. after the unexpected passing away of her mother, making a "vow to start and scale a global company in her honor".

In 2004, Jones filed her first patent focused on video in email. For five years, she developed EyeMail Inc. during her spare time, as she was also working full-time as an executive in telecommunications in Atlanta. Initially, EyeMail Inc. was turned down by a number of American development agencies, so Jones worked with several international technical teams until choosing a final partnership, which developed the product in only six months. During her development process, Jones participated in Microsoft's Mentor/Protégé Innovation Lab Program, which "provided more support and expertise", as well as its Innovation Center, becoming the first African-American woman to do so.

In 2008, Jones presented EyeMail Inc. in the first season of the CBS reality competition show The Next Tycoon, which she won. Jones subsequently contacted Georgia's Greater Women's Business Council (GWBC) and offered to create a free EyeMail Inc. campaign for them. The campaign caught the attention of Time Warner executives, and the company became EyeMail Inc.'s first client. This prompted Jones to leave her day job and fully dedicate herself to the company. Following Time Warner, EyeMail Inc. began to work with other companies like The Coca-Cola Company, Delta Air Lines, Major League Baseball, Porsche North America, Aetna, the Atlanta Braves, and The Home Depot, among others. In 2008, EyeMail Inc. was listed at number 3 on the Atlanta Tribune's list for the "Top 8 Atlanta Businesses to Watch".

In 2008, EyeMail Inc. began a formal relationship with The Coca-Cola Company as part of their mentor program through the Georgia Minority Supplier Diversity Council (GMSDC). Three years later, the mentorship program with The Coca-Cola Company resulted in EyeMail Inc.'s selection by the Microsoft Corporation as a premier MWBE supplier in digital marketing. EyeMail's business partnership with The Coca-Cola Company was pivotal to the growth of the company, purportedly causing its revenue to quadruple. This allowed Jones' company to expand to Canada, Mexico, Pakistan, India and the United Kingdom.

As both a black-owned and woman-owned business, EyeMail Inc. is a partner of the Billion Dollar Roundtable organization, where it classified as a Minority Women Business Enterprise (MWBE) strategic partner. As EyeMail Inc.'s CEO, Jones took part as a panelist at the 2014 Billion Dollar Summit held by the Minority Business News USA (MBNUSA).

=== Recent years (2015–present) ===
Writing for Forbes magazine in 2021, Laurel Donnellan noted that: "EyeMail's next-generation email experience has repeatedly proven with increases to click-through and call-to-action open rates while bringing email to life for a more engaging & memorable experience. Customers have achieved open rates of 60% and click-through rates of 38%, far above the industry average." In 2018, Jones announced that the company would expand its business model of custom-made campaigns, moving towards a software as a service (SaaS) platform. As of 2020, EyeMail Inc. partners with both private businesses—including The Coca-Cola Company and Delta Air Lines—as well as nonprofit organizations, such as the Make-A-Wish Foundation. Recently, EyeMail Inc. has launched a new product called EyeCon, which animates a logo or email signature, which, according to Forbess Lauren Donellan, "brings company logos to life".

The company's business model grew significantly due to the ongoing COVID-19 pandemic, as the need for employers to effectively communicate digitally became more relevant. In 2020, EyeMail Inc. announced the release of new options to support the hearing and visually impaired with close captioning, so they can also engage with the company's video email technology. This new venture was done in collaboration with Senior Architects at Microsoft's Innovation Lab. The company is also developing a "video in text solution" to expand product offerings, expected to be launched in 2022.

In 2020, EyeMail Inc.was chosen by PepsiCo as one of 15 participants in the Stacy's Pita Chips's Rise Project, a mentorship program to support black women business owners. As part of the project, EyeMail was added to a Female Founder Finder directory, which directs consumers to nearby female-founded businesses.

In early 2023, EyeMail's Lisa S. Jones was listed among the "finest email mavens" by Uplers. In May, she was among the winners of the Enterprising Women of the Year Award, and the following month she listed as one of Top 100 Women of the Future in Emerging Tech by Women of the Future. In June, Microsoft dedicated a special case study on EyeMail Inc., noting that it grew 71% in 2 years and delivers managed services projects 40% faster following the adoption of Microsoft 365 Business Premium. The company has thus "[earned] a spot on the Inc. list of fast-growing small companies in the US Southeast region for 2023." Writing for Microsoft the same year, Susanna Ray uses EyeMail Inc. as an example of "black-owned companies [that] are using corporate connections to give back". The writer noted: "When Microsoft announced its Racial Equity Initiative in 2020 and set a goal to double the number of Black suppliers it does business with, a procurement engagement manager for the company remembered Jones and reached out, partnering with EyeMail to integrate video in email marketing communications as part of the Windows 11 launch in 2021." In the same article, Jones stated:

I started crying when I got my first contract with Microsoft, because I was full of gratitude. Everyone told me, "You're a woman, you're a Black woman, you're from Alabama, you don't have the right network, you're not a coder" — I could go on and on. But I said, "I am going to make it." So when I was awarded the Microsoft contract, and the supplier number, the whole process of onboarding was fabulous, and it was exhilarating. We have a lot of Fortune 500 customers on our roster now, and there are so many tangible and intangible benefits to this relationship that continue to evolve and show up.

In November 2023, EyeMail Inc. was selected among the winners of Invest Connect, a pitch competition organized by the Technology Association of Georgia (TAG) as part of their Bridge Builders initiative, aimed to link black-owned businesses with investors.

== Awards and nominations ==
Year	Presented by	Award	Result	Ref.
2008	Atlanta Tribune	Top 8 Atlanta Businesses to Watch	Won	
2008	Technology Association of Georgia	Top 40 Innovative Companies	Won	
2009	Georgia Technology	Industry Award	Won	
2010	Black Enterprise	Innovator of the Year	Finalist	
2010	Black Enterprise	Georgia Minority Technology Industry Award	Won	
2010	Stevie Awards	Most Innovative Company of the Year	Won	
2011	Women in Technology Honoree	Innovator of the Year	Won	
2014	Women in Technology Honoree	Innovator of the Year	Won	
2018	Delta Air Lines	Catalyst of the Year	Won	
2019	Minority Business Entrepreneur	WBEs Who Rock Award	Won	
2021	Global Business Leaders Mag	20 Innovative Companies Which Everyone Should Know in 2021	Won	
2021	Upliers Email	Top 29 Experts Email Marketing Trends	Won	
2022	Microsoft Supplier Prestige Awards	Diverse-Owned Supplier of the Year	Finalist	
2022	Women in Technology	Women of the Year Award	Finalist	
2022	Corporate Vision	Corporate Excellence Awards	Won	
2023	Enterprising Women	Enterprising Women of the Year Awards	Won	
2023	Women of the Future	Top 100 Women of the Future in Emerging Tech	Won	
2023	Inc.	The Fastest-Growing Companies in the US Southeast	Won	
2023	Women in Technology	Fearless Woman in Technology	Won	
2023	Technology Association of Georgia	Invest Connect	Won	

== See also ==
- History of email
- List of Georgia (U.S. state) companies
