= List of people from Montgomery, Alabama =

The city of Montgomery, the capital and second-largest city of the U.S. state of Alabama, has been the birthplace and home of these notable individuals.

== Arts and entertainment ==
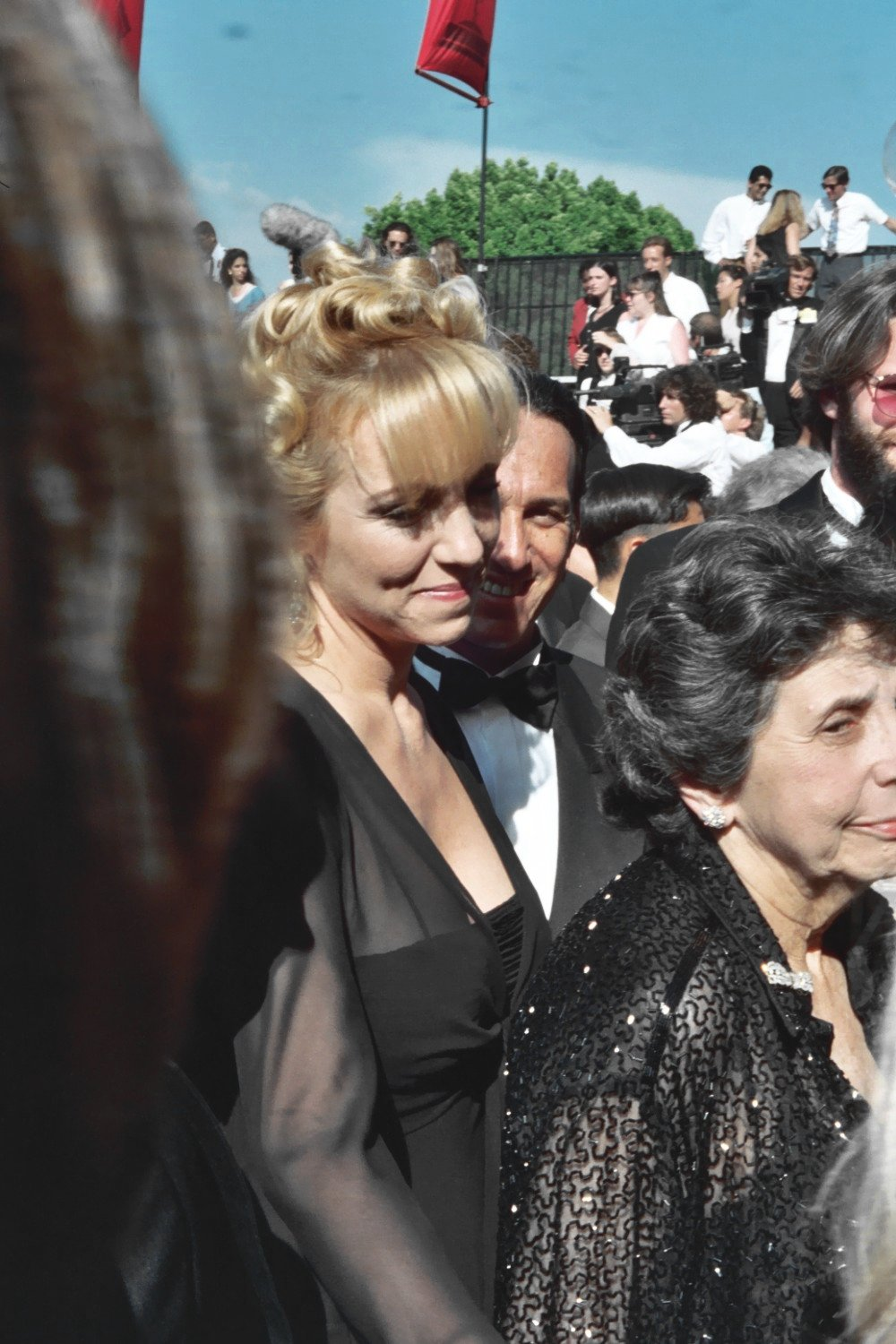
Brett Butler

Name	Notability	References
Jensen Buchanan	Soap opera actress	
Brett Butler	Actress and comedy performer	
Glenn Howerton	Actor/writer, It's Always Sunny in Philadelphia	
Rusty Joiner	Model/actor	
Michael O'Neill	Actor, The West Wing	
Octavia Spencer	Academy Award-winning actress	
Bill Traylor	Self-taught artist, painter	
Michael Young	Emmy-winning actor	

=== Music ===
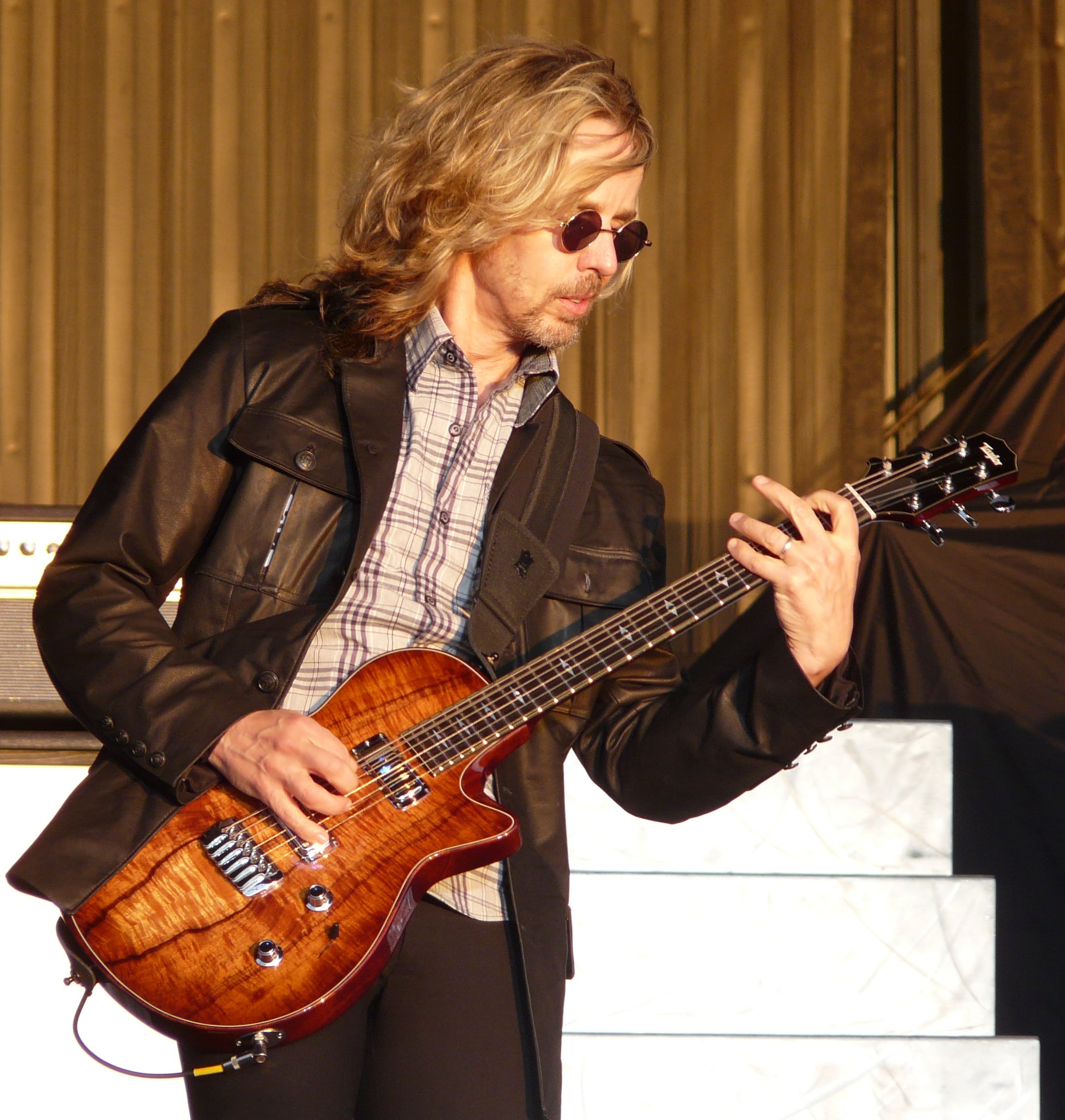
Tommy Shaw

Name	Notability	References
Gloria D. Brown	R&B, soul, funk, pop singer	
Clarence Carter	Blind soul singer and guitarist	
Nat King Cole	Jazz singer and pianist	
John Collins	Jazz guitarist	
Dirty	Rap duo	
Doe B	Rapper	
Eddie Floyd	Soul singer/songwriter	
Frankie Jaxon	Jazz and vaudeville singer	
Claude Jeter	Gospel singer	
Howard Johnson	Jazz musician	
Jamey Johnson	Country singer-songwriter	
Joe Morris	Jazz trumpeter	
Nell Rankin	Opera singer	
Tommy Shaw	Guitarist of Styx	
Robert Shimp	Recording engineer and producer	
Toni Tennille	Singer, Captain & Tennille	
Big Mama Thornton	Blues singer	
Hank Williams, Sr.	Country singer	
Jett Williams	Country singer, daughter of Hank	

== Civil rights ==
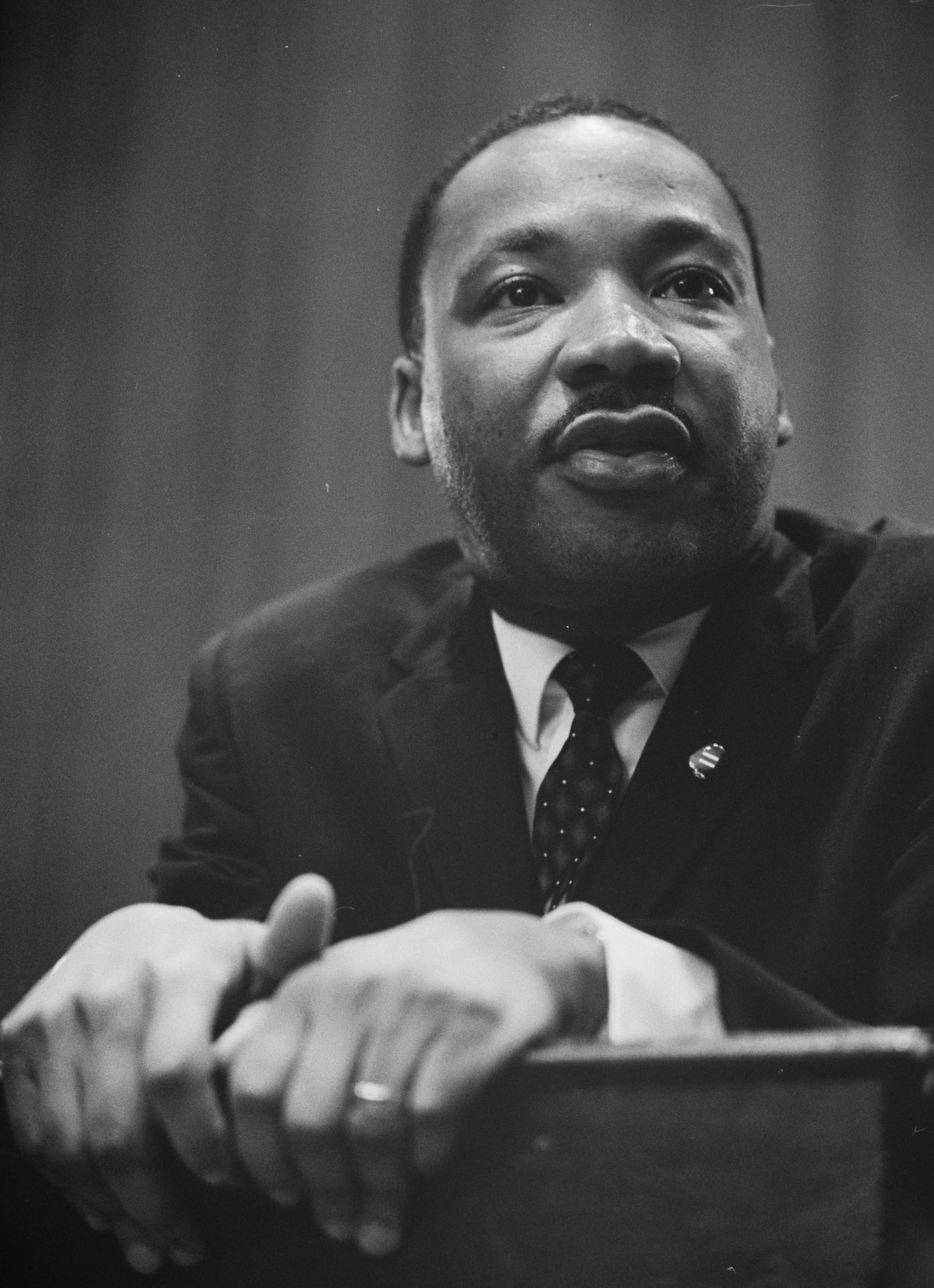
Martin Luther King Jr.

Name	Notability	References
Ralph Abernathy	Baptist minister, Southern Christian Leadership Conference leader	
Inez Baskin	Journalist and activist	
Johnnie Carr	Montgomery Improvement Association president, Montgomery bus boycott co-organizer	
Claudette Colvin	Pioneer of the civil rights movement	
Morris Dees	Southern Poverty Law Center founder	
Mahala Ashley Dickerson	First black female attorney in Alabama	
Hazel Nell Dukes	Activist and president of the NAACP	
Fred Gray	Attorney, founding member of the Montgomery Improvement Association	
Richard H. Harris Jr.	Prominent civil rights leader, pharmacist and Tuskegee Airmen	
Vernon Johns	Minister, mentor to early civil rights leaders	
Martin Luther King Jr.	Minister, founded the Montgomery Improvement Association and the Southern Christian Leadership Conference while in Montgomery, led the Montgomery bus boycott and Selma to Montgomery march	
Martin Luther King III	Advocate, SCLC president	
Yolanda King	Advocate and actress	
E. D. Nixon	Attorney (Browder v. Gayle), local NAACP president, Montgomery Improvement Association founder	
Rosa Parks	Sparked the Montgomery bus boycott	

== Literature and journalism ==
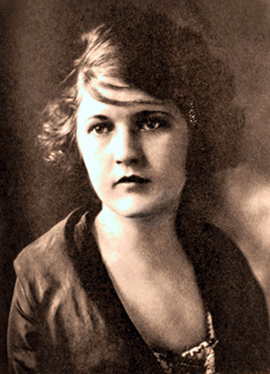
Zelda Fitzgerald

Name	Notability	References
Zelda Fitzgerald	Writer, wife of F. Scott Fitzgerald	
Jim Fyffe	Auburn Tigers radio announcer	
Anne George	Writer, 1994 Alabama State Poet	
Mary Katharine Ham	Writer, columnist, Fox News contributor	
Joseph Lewis	Freethinker	
Everette Maddox	Poet	
Harold E. Martin	Pulitzer Prize-winning journalist	
Charles Moore	Photographer, chronicled the Civil Rights Movement	
Gin Phillips	Writer	
T.K. Thorne	Writer; books, poetry, short stories and screenplays	
Barbara Wiedemann	Poet, English professor at Auburn Montgomery	

== Military ==
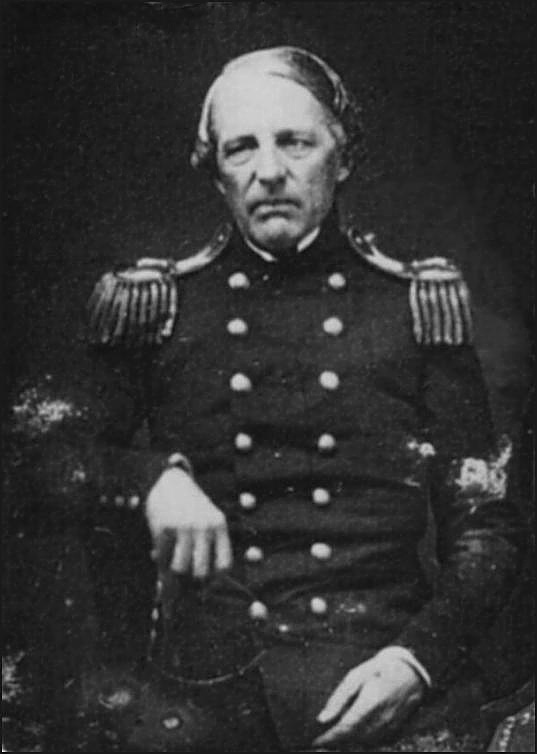
Samuel Cooper

Name	Notability	References
William W. Allen	Major general in the Confederate States Army	
Samuel Cooper	First full general of the Confederate States Army	
John G. Crommelin	United States Navy rear admiral, 1960 vice presidential candidate	
James T. Holtzclaw	General in the Confederate States Army	
Frank McIntyre	Chief of the Bureau of Insular Affairs, 1912–1929	
Danyell E. Wilson	First African American female tomb guard for the Tomb of the Unknown Soldier (Arlington) at Arlington National Cemetery	

== Politics ==
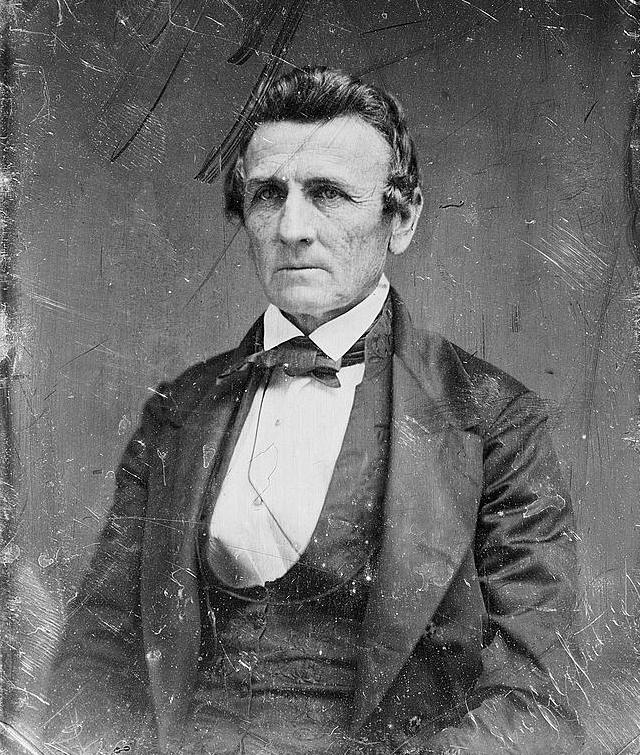
Benjamin Fitzpatrick

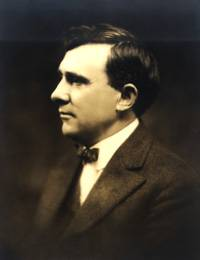
Bibb Graves

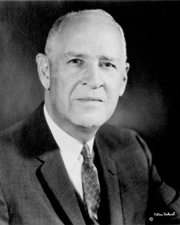
J. Lister Hill

Name	Notability	References
John Abercrombie	U.S. representative (1912–1917), president of the University of Alabama (1902–1911)	
Winton M. Blount	United States Postmaster General (1969–1972) and philanthropist	
Bobby Bright	Mayor (1999–2009), U.S. representative (2009–2011)	
Katie Britt	U.S. senator (2023–present)	
Charles Waldron Buckley	U.S. representative (1868–1873)	
Artur Davis	U.S. representative (2003–2011)	
William Louis Dickinson	U.S. representative (1965–1993)	
Edward C. Elmore	Confederate States of America treasurer	
Benjamin Fitzpatrick	11th governor of Alabama (1841–1845); United States senator (1848–9, 1953-5, 1855–61) and president pro tempore (1857–60)	
Emory Folmar	Mayor (1977–1999)	
Jim Folsom Jr.	50th governor of Alabama (1993–1995), lieutenant governor (1987–1993, 2007–2011)	
MacDonald Gallion	Attorney general of Alabama (1953–63, 1967–71)	
Bibb Graves	38th governor of Alabama (1927–1931, 1935–1939)	
Dixie Bibb Graves	First female United States senator from Alabama (1937–1938)	
J. Lister Hill	U.S. representative (1923–38), U.S. senator (1938–69), Senate Majority Whip (1941–47), known for the Hill-Burton Act	
Perry O. Hooper Jr.	Member of Alabama House of Representatives (1984–2003)	
Perry O. Hooper Sr.	Alabama Supreme Court 27th chief justice (1995–2001)	
Thomas G. Jones	28th governor of Alabama (1890–1894)	
Claude R. Kirk Jr.	Governor of Florida (1967–1971)	
Ann McCrory	First Lady of North Carolina	
Gordon Persons	46th governor of Alabama (1951–1955)	
Martha Roby	Congresswoman from Alabama's 2nd congressional district (2011–2021)	
Joe M. Rodgers	Construction executive, United States Ambassador to France	
Dorothy Tillman	Former Chicago alderman	
Steve Windom	28th lieutenant governor of Alabama (1999–2003)	
William Lowndes Yancey	U.S. representative (1844–46), Fire-Eater secession advocate, Confederate diplomat and Senator	

== Science and medicine ==
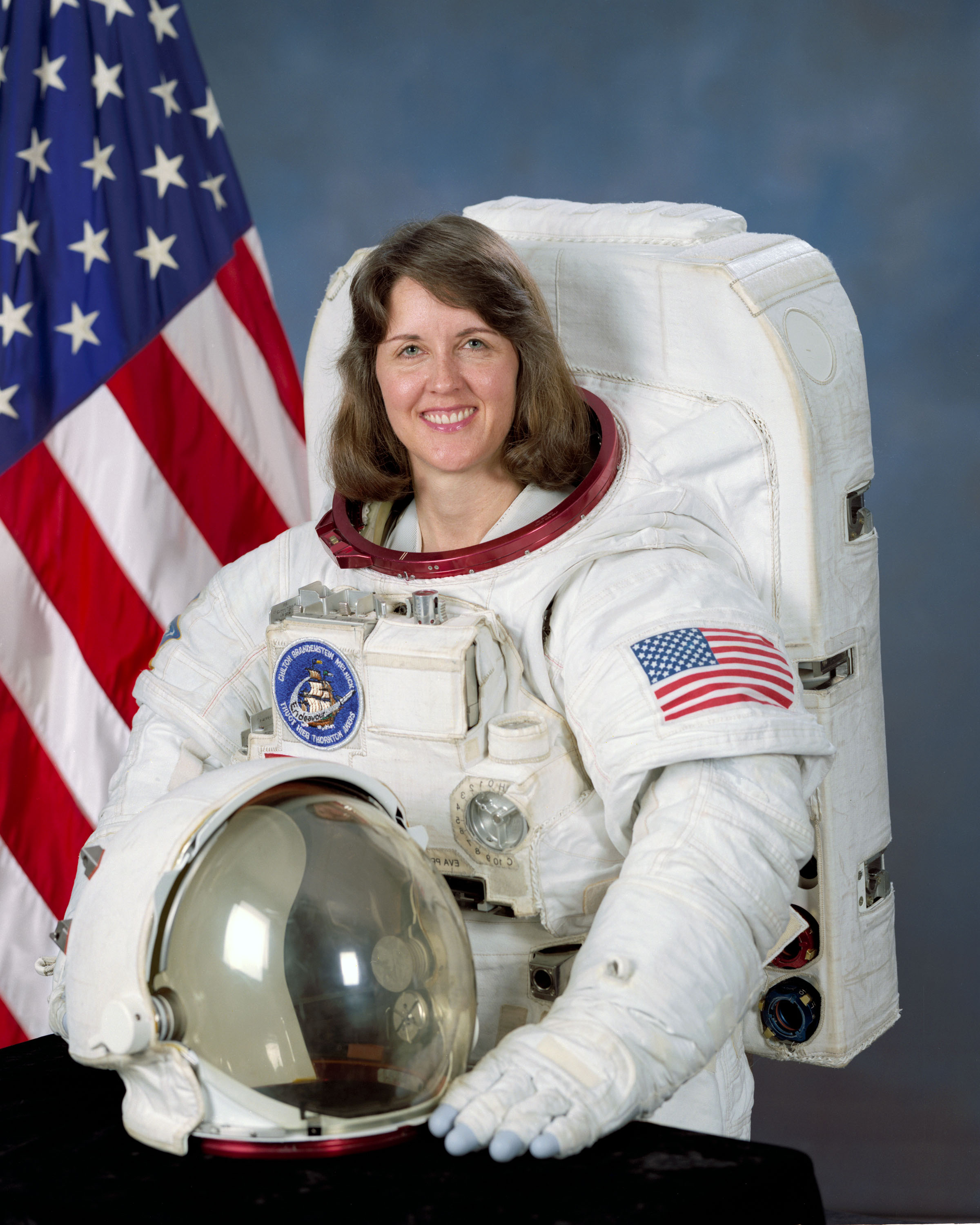
Kathryn Thornton

Name	Notability	References
Percy Lavon Julian	Chemist	
J. Marion Sims	In the 1840s, Montgomery's leading physician and medical experimenter	
Dorothy Tennov	Psychologist	
Kathryn C. Thornton	Astronaut, part of STS-61 mission to repair the Hubble Space Telescope	

== Sports ==
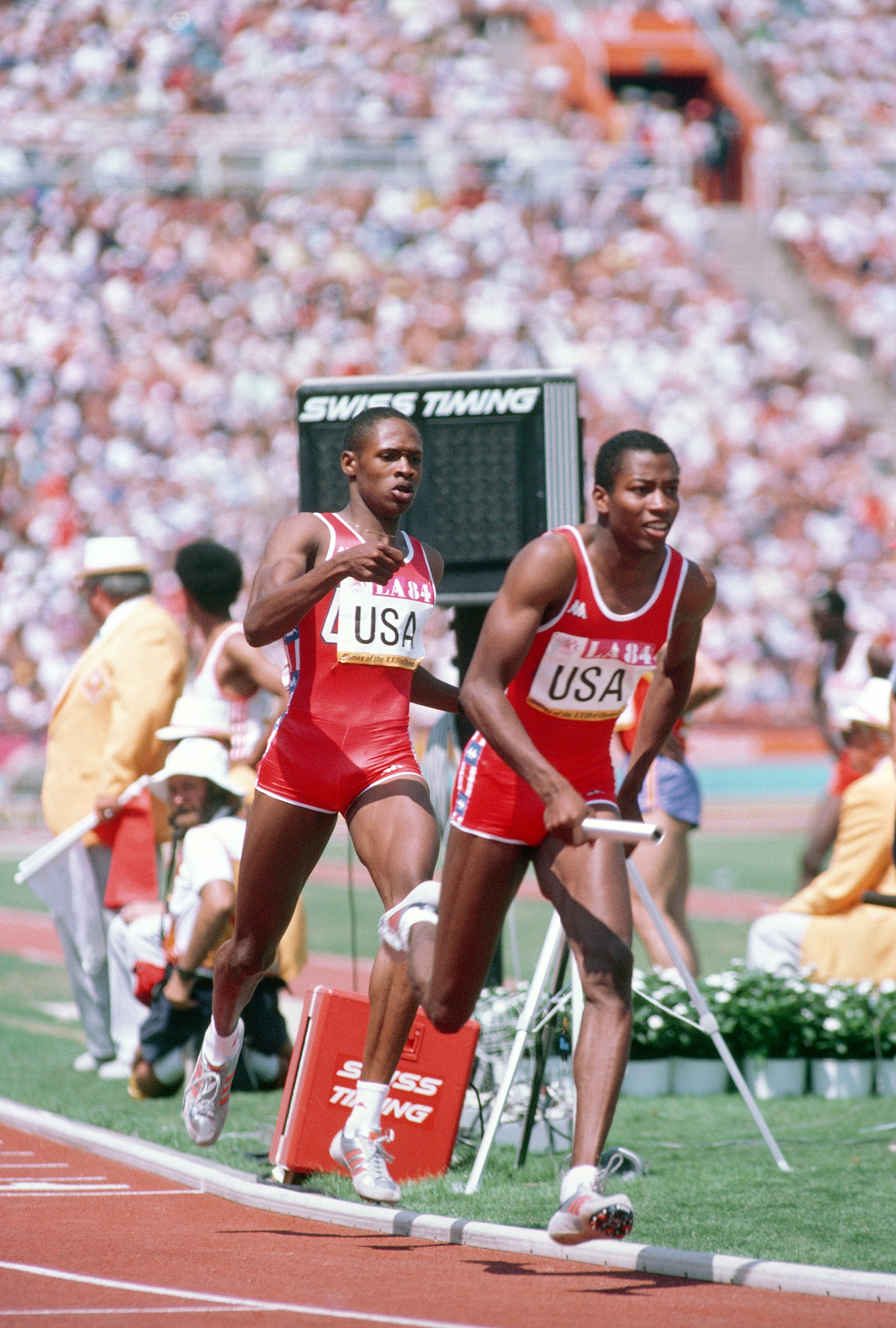
Alonzo Babers

Name	Notability	References
Austin Adams	Atlantic League of Professional Baseball pitcher for the Lexington Legends	
Marlon Anderson	Major League Baseball player for seven teams	
Alonzo Babers	Gold medal-winning sprinter at 1984 Summer Olympics (400m and 4 × 400 m relay)	
Reggie Barlow	NFL wide receiver, Super Bowl XXXVII champion, Alabama State head coach	
Fred Beasley	Pro Bowl fullback with San Francisco 49ers	
Terry Beasley	Auburn Tigers wide receiver, member of College Football Hall of Fame	
Caesar Belser	American Football League and NFL defensive back, Super Bowl IV champion	
Ray Black Jr.	NASCAR driver	
Tom Boswell	National Basketball Association player, 1976 champion with Boston Celtics	
Aundray Bruce	National Football League player, 1988 NFL draft first overall selection	
Antoine Caldwell	Houston Texans and former Alabama Crimson Tide offensive lineman	
Monreko Crittenden	American Indoor Football Association and Auburn Tigers player	
Johnny Davis	NFL running back, Super Bowl XVI champion with San Francisco 49ers	
Chris Dickerson	Bodybuilder, 1982 Mr. Olympia	
Richmond Flowers	NFL safety	
Oscar Gamble	Major League Baseball outfielder	
Leslie Gaston	Professional soccer player	
Orlando Graham	NBA forward	
Carlos Hendricks	Football defensive back	
Tarvaris Jackson	NFL quarterback for Minnesota Vikings	
Terrence Long	Major League Baseball outfielder	
Tom Neville	American Football League tackle	
Tom Oliver	Major League Baseball outfielder and manager	
Quentin Riggins	Professional football player	
Kirby Smart	Head football coach of the Georgia Bulldogs	
Bart Starr	Pro Football Hall of Fame quarterback for Green Bay Packers, 5-time NFL champion	
Allen Trammel	Professional football player	
Freeman White	Consensus All-American and professional football player	
Willie Wilson	Major League Baseball outfielder and 1985 World Series champion	
Delmon Young	Major League Baseball outfielder	

== Others ==
Name	Notability	References
Herbert Baumer	Architect	
Adele Goodman Clark	Suffragist and artist	
Frances Scott Fitzgerald	Daughter of F. Scott Fitzgerald	
Bob Jones Jr.	Bob Jones University president and chancellor	
Lisa S. Jones	Businesswoman, founder of EyeMail Inc.	
Henry Lehman	Cotton broker and financier, company developed into the Lehman Brothers conglomerate	
Adolph S. Moses	Rabbi of Kahl Montgomery	
Jerry Parr	Secret Service agent, saved Ronald Reagan during assassination attempt	
Albert Parsons	Anarchist, labor activist, Haymarket Riot organizer	
Blake Percival	Whistleblower	
Priscilla Cooper Tyler	Daughter-in-law of president John Tyler	

== See also ==
- List of people from Alabama
- List of mayors of Montgomery, Alabama
- Alabama State University alumni
