= Shanece McKinney =

American basketball player (born 1992)

Personal information
- Born: August 25, 1992 (age 34) Mobile, Alabama, U.S.
- Listed height: 6 ft 4 in (1.93 m)
- Listed weight: 215 lb (98 kg)

Career information
- High school: LeFlore Magnet (Mobile, Alabama)
- College: LSU (2010–2014)
- Position: Center / Forward
- Number: 24

Career history
- 2014: New York Liberty
- Stats at Basketball Reference

Shanece Laiquale McKinney Sims (née McKinney; born August 25, 1992) is an American former professional basketball player who played for the New York Liberty of the Women's National Basketball Association (WNBA). She played college basketball for the LSU Tigers.

== Early life ==
Shanece Laiquale McKinney was born on August 25, 1992 in Mobile, Alabama. She played four years of basketball at LeFlore Magnet High School in Mobile. She averaged 18.0 points, 10.0 rebounds and 3.0 blocks per game her junior year, leading the team to a 25–2 record and a Class 5A state title win. McKinney averaged 18.0 points, 14.0 rebounds and 3.4 blocks per game as a senior, earning All-State and 2009-10 Class 5A Player of the Year honors. She missed eight games her senior year due to a knee injury. She received an invite to the USA Basketball U18 National Team Trials after her senior year. McKinney rated the No. 79 overall player in the country by ESPN Hoopgurlz.com.

== College career ==
McKinney played college basketball for the LSU Tigers from 2010 to 2014. She played in 22 games as a freshman in 2010–11, averaging 2.5 points and 1.9 rebounds per game. She appeared in 27 games, starting five, during the 2011–12 season, averaging 1.8 points, 1.5 rebounds, and 1.0 blocks per game. McKinney played in 34 games, starting 20, in 2012–13, averaging 4.1 points, 3.7 rebounds and 1.1 blocks per game. She appeared in 34 games, starting, 25 her senior season in 2013–14, averaging 7.5 points, 4.6 rebounds and 1.6 blocks per game.

McKinney majored in sports administration at LSU. She was also named to the 2014 SEC Community Service Team and the 2013 Barclays Invitational All-Tournament Team.

== Professional career ==
After going undrafted in the 2014 WNBA draft, McKinney signed with the New York Liberty on April 22, 2014. She was the only rookie on the Liberty's opening day roster that season. She played in 24 games for the Liberty in 2014, averaging 1.8 points and 1.4 rebounds per game. McKinney was waived on May 28, 2015, a week before the start of the 2015 season.

McKinney signed a training camp contract with the Chicago Sky on March 7, 2016. She was waived on May 11, 2016.

McKinney was signed by the Indiana Fever on February 3, 2017. She was waived on May 3, 2017.

McKinney also played professional basketball overseas, including for three EuroLeague teams: the Union Hainaut in France, Cankaya in Turkey and Bembibre in Spain. She played for teams in South Korea, Romania, and Lebanon as well. She helped Cankaya win the TKBL regular season title during the 2014–15 season after averaging 14.4 points, 8.4 rebounds and 1.5 blocks per game.

== Coaching career ==
McKinney has spent time as a high school head basketball coach and an assistant coach at Coastal Alabama Community College.

== Personal life ==
McKinney married Anthony Sims Jr.
