= List of Georgia (U.S. state) companies =

This is a list of Georgia companies, current and former businesses whose headquarters are, or were, in the U.S. state of Georgia.

== Companies based in Georgia ==
=== A ===
- Aaron's, Inc.
- Acuity Brands
- Aflac
- AGCO
- American Honda Power Equipment Division and Honda Marine Group
- American Megatrends
- AT&T Mobility
- Atlanta Bread Company
- Autotrader.com
- Axiall

=== B ===
- Beazer Homes USA
- Blue Bird Corporation
- BlueLinx

=== C ===
- Carter's
- Chick-fil-A
- CNN
- The Coca-Cola Company
- Colonial Pipeline
- Cox Communications
- Cox Enterprises
- Cox Media Group
- Crawford & Company

=== D ===
- Delta Air Lines

=== E ===
- EarthLink
- Equifax
- Exide
- EyeMail Inc.

=== F ===
- Floor & Decor
- Flowers Foods

=== G ===
- Genuine Parts Company
- Georgia-Pacific
- Global Franchise Group
- Great American Cookies
- Greenwood

=== H ===
- Havertys
- Hitachi Koki U.S.A. Ltd. and Hitachi Telecom Inc.
- The Home Depot
- Hooters
- Huddle House

=== L ===
- LendingPoint
- LexisNexis Risk Solutions

=== M ===
- Manheim Auctions
- Marble Slab Creamery
- Moe's Southwest Grill

=== N ===
- NanoLumens
- The National Bank of Georgia
- NCR Corporation
- Newell Brands
- Norfolk Southern Railway

=== O ===
- Oxford Industries

=== P ===
- Perkins Restaurant & Bakery
- Pretzelmaker

=== R ===
- RaceTrac Petroleum, Inc.
- Rollins, Inc.

=== S ===
- ServiceMaster
- Sharecare
- Southern Company
- Southern Company Gas
- Spanx
- Stuckey's
- Synovus

=== T ===
- Ted's Montana Grill
- Tropical Smoothie Cafe
- TSYS
- Turner Broadcasting System

=== U ===
- United Parcel Service

=== V ===
- Vendormate
- Veritiv

=== W ===
- W. C. Bradley Co.
- Waffle House
- The Weather Channel
- WestRock
- World Financial Group

=== Z ===
- Zaxby's

== Companies formerly based in Georgia ==
=== A ===
- Atlantic Southeast Airlines

=== B ===
- BellSouth
- Bill Heard Enterprises
- Blimpie

=== C ===
- CareerBuilder
- Carmike Cinemas
- Ciba Vision

=== D ===
- Detonics
- Don Pablo's

=== E ===
- Element Skateboards

=== G ===
- Gold Kist

=== H ===
- Harveys Supermarkets

=== I ===
- Infor

=== K ===
- Kaiser Permanente

=== M ===
- Mirant

=== N ===
- Newell Brands

=== R ===
- RockTenn

=== S ===
- Spectrum Brands

=== W ===
- World Airways

== See also ==
- List of companies based in Atlanta
- List of companies of the United States by state
- List of manufacturing companies based in Atlanta
