= LeFlore Magnet High School =

Coordinates: 30.71446°N 88.08698°W

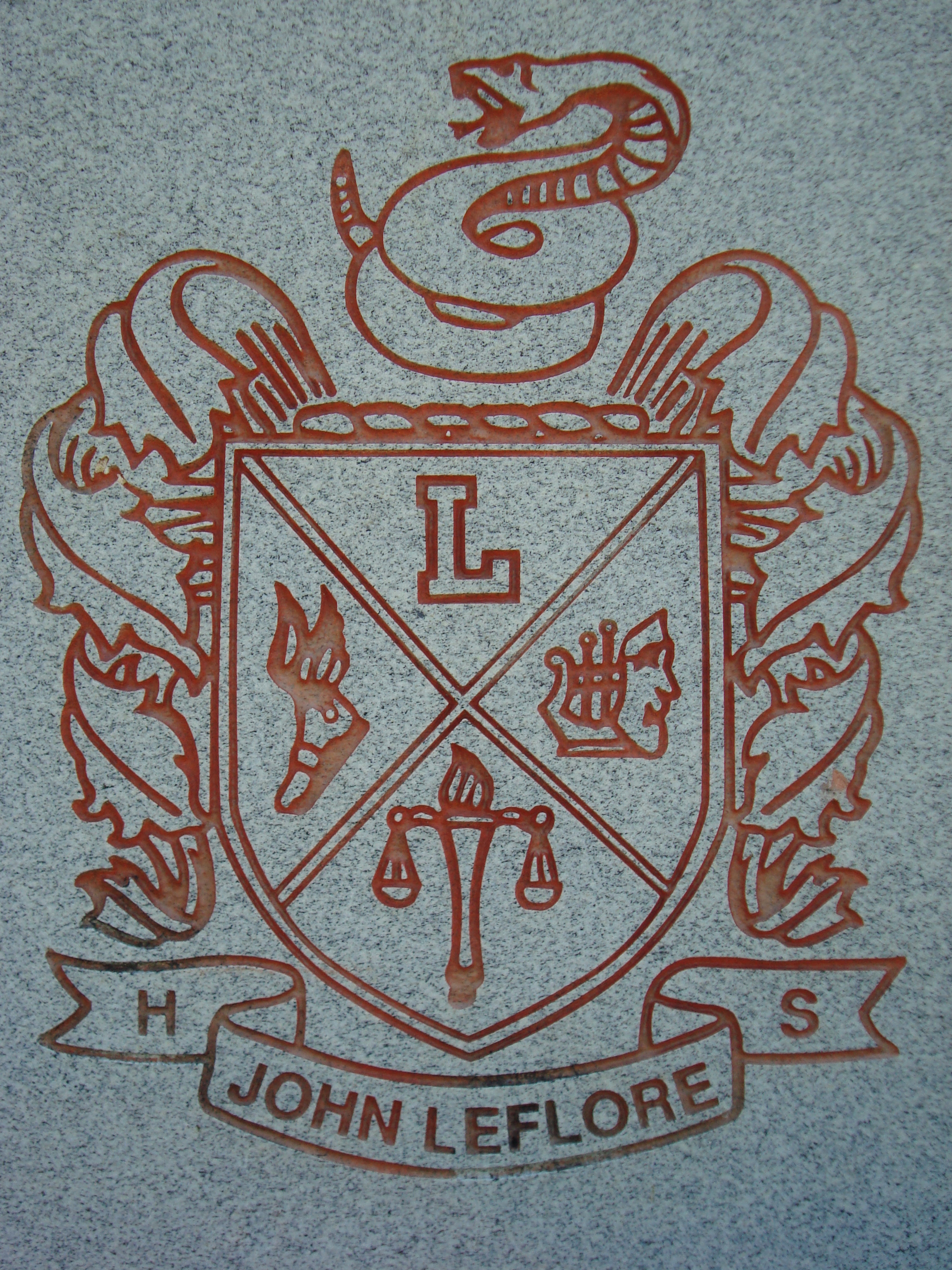

Location
- 2263 St. Stephens Rd. Mobile, Alabama 36617; United States

Information
- School type: Public Magnet
- Motto: Excellence in Education
- Established: 1968 (58 years ago)
- School district: Mobile County Public School System #4
- CEEB code: 011831
- Principal: Dr. Antonio Williams
- Teaching staff: 44.00 (FTE)
- Grades: 9–12
- Enrollment: 564 (2023–2024)
- Student to teacher ratio: 12.82
- Campus type: Suburban
- Colors: Bright Orange and Kelly Green
- Mascot: Rattlesnake
- Team name: Rattlers
- Website: www.leflorerattlers.com

John L. LeFlore Magnet High School of Advanced Communication and Fine Arts is a historically black high school located in Toulminville, Mobile, Alabama, United States. The school is accredited by the Southern Association of Colleges and Schools. It currently enrolls 947 students in grades 9-12, and is a part of the Mobile County Public School System.

The school offers Nursing, U. S. Army JROTC, Engineering, Moving Images Dance Company, Band, Visual Arts, Piano, Chorus, Pre-Law, Health Services, Marketing, Media Entertainment, Theatre, Culinary Arts and other career technical education courses. Its curriculum focuses on programs tailored for students, with a strong emphasis on performing arts, communication, law, and media entertainment.

== About LeFlore ==
From 1968 through 1980, the school was known as Toulminville High School, offering secondary education to upper-middle class students within the Toulminville suburb. In 1981 the school was renamed John L. LeFlore High School in honor of John L. LeFlore, a civil rights activist, husband of Teah Beck, and Mobile NAACP leader elected to the legislature in Mobile County. The renaming of the school brought about a move into an authentic building with the amenities that would equip the institution for the upcoming magnet program. It was not until the mid-1980s that the learning institution gained a magnet program and changed the name to John L. LeFlore Magnet High School of Advanced Communication & Fine Arts.

LeFlore is the only school in the Mobile County Public School System divided into two schools: comprehensive and magnet. The comprehensive school is exclusively for students zoned in LeFlore's school district, while the magnet school is dedicated to students who matriculated from middle magnet schools or are newly accepted applicants into the magnet program. Middle magnet schools that matriculate students to LeFlore include Clark-Shaw Magnet School, Paul Laurence Dunbar Magnet School, and Phillips Preparatory Magnet School.

LeFlore requires students, whether comprehensive or magnet, to adhere and highly perform to the rigorous curriculum, and to adhere to the uniform code implemented by Mobile County Public School System in 1995.

Aside from the school's curriculum and performing arts, LeFlore is also known for its Mighty Marching Rattler Band, which is influenced in musical style and marching precision by Jackson State's "Sonic Boom of the South", Florida A&M's "Marching 100" and Southern University's "Human Jukebox Band".

== Notable alumni ==
- DeMarcus Cousins, NBA player
- Shomari Figures, politician
- Paul Harris, NFL player
- Loren Jordan, reality TV star from Bad Girls Club, Class of 2007/2008
- Darnell Kennedy, Arena / Indoor football player
- Antonio Lang, Cleveland Cavaliers assistant coach, Duke University alum and ex-NBA player (1994-00)
- Eddie Lewis, NFL player
- Anthony Marshall, NFL player
- Robert McCune, CFL player for the Calgary Stampeders
- Rich Boy, rapper
- Lawyer Tillman, NFL player
- Miriam Witherspoon, American politician
- Shanece McKinney, WNBA player
