= National LGBT Chamber of Commerce =

US LGBT business community organization

- Formation: 2002
- Founder: Justin G. Nelson, Chance Mitchell
- Type: Non-profit
- Headquarters: 1331 F St. NW
- Location: Washington, D.C.
- Region served: US/Worldwide
- Leader: Justin G. Nelson, president, Chance Mitchell, CEO
- Staff: 22 (2017)
- Website: www.nglcc.org

The National LGBT Chamber of Commerce (NGLCC) is a U.S. based nonprofit advocacy organization focused on promoting economic opportunities of the LGBT business community. Its headquarters are in NW in Washington, D.C. The NGLCC certifies LGBT-owned businesses, conferring LGBT Business Enterprise (LGBTBE) branding. The organization also supports the inclusion of these businesses in corporate and government supplier diversity programs. In October 2017, it changed its name from the National Gay & Lesbian Chamber of Commerce to National LGBT Chamber of Commerce to reflect broader representation within the LGBT community.

== Overview ==
The NGLCC was co-founded in 2002 by Justin G. Nelson and Chance Mitchell. Nelson has served as president since the NGLCC was founded, and Mitchell has served as CEO over the same period. Their goal was to create an organization that could support LGBT business owners and showcase the diversity of talent in the lesbian, gay, bisexual, and transgender communities. NGLCC provides direct links between businesses, corporate partners, government organizations and other community groups that support LGBT economic opportunity.

In early 2004, NGLCC created a "diversity certification program", making the organization a national third-party certifying body for LGBT-owned businesses.

The NGLCC has a network of more than 50 local, state, and international affiliate LGBT chambers of commerce, and serves to represent their economic interests and opportunities.

The NGLCC offices employ approximately 15 full-time staff. The NGLCC runs an internship and fellowship program to support operations.

NGLCC co-founders Justin G. Nelson and Chance Mitchell also serve on the board of directors. NGLCC senior executives also include Sabrina Kent, and Anthony Wisniewski.

Jonathan Lovitz served as Senior Vice President of NGLCC and Director of nglccNY from 2015-2023 until being appointed to the US Department of Commerce by President Biden.

In 2017 NGLCC released its first proprietary data, the "America's LGBT Economy Report". Among the findings reported: a typical LGBT business has been in business, on average, for more than 12 years and that LGBT businesses contribute more than $1.7 trillion to the U.S. economy and have created more than 33,000 jobs.

In 2018 and early 2019, as the leading public policy organization on behalf of LGBT-owned businesses, NGLCC won the public sector contracting inclusion of certified LGBTBEs in Orlando, Florida; Nashville, Tennessee; Baltimore, Maryland; Jersey City, New Jersey; and Hoboken, New Jersey, while also advancing statewide bills in New York and New Jersey. Currently, California, Massachusetts, and Pennsylvania also include certified LGBT-owned businesses, along with major cities like Seattle, Newark, Columbus, and Philadelphia.

== Programs ==
=== LGBT Business Enterprise (LGBTBE) Certification ===
Since 2004, the NGLCC has offered certification to businesses owned by LGBT people. This certification is intended to help corporate and government procurement teams source from LGBT-owned products and services, also known as supplier diversity. As of December 2023, NGLCC has certified 2,151 businesses across the United States. Certification is a multi-step process involving an application and supporting documents, a site visit, and final approval before a national certification committee.

In August 2007 the NGLCC signed a memorandum of understanding with the Women's Business Enterprise National Council to provide opportunities for dual-certification as both a women-owned, and lesbian, bisexual or transgender-owned, business. In 2011 the Human Rights Campaign (HRC) began including active sourcing of LGBT certified businesses as part of the Corporate Equality Index, a national directory of gay-friendly workplaces. In 2017, HRC further expanded the index criteria to require LGBT-inclusion in supplier diversity programs as a stand-alone scored metric.

In August 2017 it was announced that the Billion Dollar Roundtable will now include NGLCC certified LGBTs as a category of diverse vendors counted by corporations spending a billion dollars or more on procurement with diversity-owned firms. The Billion Dollar Roundtable was created in 2001 to recognize and celebrate corporations that achieved spending of at least $1 billion with minority and woman-owned suppliers.

=== Corporate partnerships ===
The NGLCC offers corporate membership. Over 300 companies are recognized as corporate partners of the NGLCC. Partnership provides benefits such as access to certified suppliers, recognition as supporters of the LGBT business community and opportunities to share best practice in supplier diversity. The NGLCC recognizes 10 companies as founding corporate members.

- IBM
- Wells Fargo
- JP Morgan Chase & Co
- American Express
- Intel
- Wyndham Worldwide
- American Airlines
- Ernst & Young
- Aetna
- Motorola

=== NGLCC National Dinner ===
The NGLCC National Dinner is an annual awards event held in November to celebrate progress in the LGBT business community.

It was first held in 2003 and has been continuously presented at the National Building Museum in Washington, DC. It is attended by businesspeople, LGBT equality advocates, and political figures.

Honors bestowed at the NGLCC National Dinner include: NGLCC/American Airlines ExtrAA Mile Award, Corporation of the Year, Supplier Diversity Advocate of the Year, and LGBT Supplier of the Year.

The NGLCC/American Airlines ExtrAA Mile Award recognizes an LGBT or allied person, persons or organization that have gone the extra mile to support LGBT equality. Previous NGLCC National Dinner Honorees have included: former U.S. Secretary of State Hillary Clinton, NAACP Board Chair Emeritus Julian Bond, tennis legend and LGBT champion Martina Navratilova, former U.S. Secretary of Labor Hilda Solis, actress Judith Light, MSNBC news anchor Thomas Roberts, and NBA player Jason Collins.

=== NGLCC International Business & Leadership Conference ===
Every summer the NGLCC holds the NGLCC International Business and Leadership Conference. The three-day educational conference delivers leadership programming, networking, and engagement opportunities for LGBT business owners and allies. Educational programs include keynote speakers, the annual B2B Boot Camp for certified LGBT Business Enterprises, a chamber development track, marketplace expo, and one-on-one matchmaker meetings. It has previously been held in cities including Washington, DC, Minneapolis, Seattle, Las Vegas (several times), Chicago, Dallas, Fort Lauderdale, Denver, and Palm Springs. Over 1,200 people attended the 15th Anniversary 2017 NGLCC Conference in Las Vegas, Nevada.

== NGLCC Advocacy milestones ==
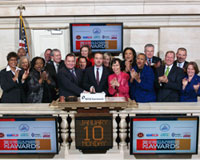
NGLCC ring NYSE Closing Bell

The NGLCC became the first LGBT organization to ring the New York Stock Exchange Closing Bell on June 20, 2005. It rang the bell again on June 5, 2009, and January 10, 2011.

In 2010 the NGLCC began international work (see above), eventually developing into NGLCC Global in 2013.

In November 2011 the NGLCC unveiled a new Supplier Innovation Center covering a second floor in the building that houses their offices. The Supplier Innovation Center is designed to facilitate training opportunities and develop best practice for small businesses, and provide a space for local start-ups to operate. The NGLCC is offering scholarships to LGBT business owners in partnership with the Tuck School of Business at Dartmouth, to be held at the Supplier Innovation Center.

In 2014, AB1678 became the first-in-the-nation public mandate requiring the intentional inclusion of certified LGBT Business Enterprises in contracting with a statewide agency, the California Public Utilities Commission.

In 2015, Massachusetts became the first state to Include certified LGBTBEs in statewide contracting, enacted by Governor Charlie Baker with the guidance of the NGLCC.

In 2016, NGLCC helped introduce the New York State Supplier Diversity Act to intentionally include LGBT, disability, and veteran owned firms in New York State contracting opportunities. That bill, along with a similar bill in New Jersey, are both in process with their respective legislatures.

In 2018 NGLCC's advocacy and public policy team was responsible for the inclusion of certified LGBT Business Enterprises in the cities of Baltimore, Maryland; Jersey City, New Jersey; and Hoboken, New Jersey. That year the groundwork was laid for similar inclusion legislation to be implemented in Chicago, the District of Columbia, Nashville, Denver, and other major cities.

In 2021, working with the NGLCC's advocacy and public policy team and NGLCC's local affiliate chamber, Three Rivers Business Alliance, the City of Pittsburgh became the first city in Pennsylvania to intentionally create an initiative to expand its inclusion of LGBT-owned businesses in municipal contracting and procurement opportunities.

== NGLCC-affiliated chambers ==
The NGLCC works with more than 50 local, state and international chambers. In 2011, the NGLCC appointed a full-time position to oversee relations with affiliated chambers. The move is considered mutually beneficial to both local chambers and the national chamber.

The NGLCC stopped national membership options in 2011, and all membership is now routed through affiliated chambers. Membership of an affiliated chamber infers membership of the NGLCC. Benefits for membership include a waiver of the fee required for supplier diversity certification. NGLCC corporate partners also offer benefits to members of affiliated chambers.

Relations between affiliated chambers, the NGLCC, and the LGBT business community are overseen by the Affiliate Chamber Council (ACC).

=== Affiliated US chambers ===
- Mid-America Gay & Lesbian Chamber of Commerce (Kansas City)
- Greater Phoenix Gay & Lesbian Chamber of Commerce
- Tucson GLBT Chamber of Commerce
- Los Angeles Gay & Lesbian Chamber of Commerce
- Desert Business Association (Palm Springs)
- Golden Gate Business Association (San Francisco)
- Long Beach Community Business Network
- Greater San Diego Business Association
- Rainbow Chamber of Commerce Silicon Valley (San Jose)
- Sacramento Rainbow Chamber of Commerce
- Connecticut Alliance for Business Opportunities
- Denver Gay and Lesbian Chamber of Commerce
- Equality Chamber of Commerce (Washington, D.C.)
- Key West Business Guild
- Miami-Dade Gay & Lesbian Chamber of Commerce
- Southwest Florida Business Guild (Sarasota)
- Space Coast Business Guild (Rockledge)
- Tampa Bay Business Guild
- Greater Fort Lauderdale Gay and Lesbian Chamber of Commerce
- Metropolitan Business Association of Orlando
- Atlanta Gay & Lesbian Chamber of Commerce
- Lesbian and Gay Businesses of Hawaii
- Chicago Area Gay & Lesbian Chamber of Commerce
- Indy Rainbow Chamber of Commerce (Indianapolis)
- Kentuckiana Rainbow Chamber of Commerce (Louisville)
- Rainbow Business & Professional Association (Portland, Maine)
- Central Massachusetts Business Council (Worcester)
- Greater Boston Business Council
- Detroit Regional LGBT Chamber of Commerce(Detroit, Michigan)
- Twin Cities Quorum (Saint Paul, Minnesota)
- Gateway Business Guild (St. Louis, MO)
- Lambda Business and Professional Association (Las Vegas)
- 3 Degrees: Northern Nevada's GLBT Business & Professional Network (Reno)
- Albuquerque GLBT Chamber of Commerce
- National Gay & Lesbian Chamber of Commerce - New York
- Triad Business & Professional Guild (Greensboro, North Carolina)
- Plexus (Cleveland, Ohio)
- Portland Area Business Association (Portland, Oregon)
- Central Pennsylvania Gay and Lesbian Chamber of Commerce (Harrisburg)
- Independence Business Alliance (Philadelphia)
- Three Rivers Business Alliance(Pittsburgh/Greater Allegheny Region)
- Nashville GLBT Chamber of Commerce
- Greater Memphis GLBT Chamber of Commerce (Memphis)
- Austin Gay & Lesbian Chamber of Commerce
- San Antonio LGBT Chamber of Commerce
- North Texas GLBT Chamber of Commerce
- Hampton Roads Business OutReach
- Richmond Business Alliance (Richmond, Virginia)
- Greater Seattle Business Association
- Massachusetts LGBT Chamber of Commerce
- Inland Northwest Business Alliance (Spokane)
- Wisconsin LGBT Chamber of Commerce (Milwaukee)
- OUT Georgia Business Alliance (Atlanta)

=== NGLCC Global ===
In 2010 the NGLCC hosted the first LGBT trade mission to Argentina, joined by U.S. LGBT businesses. The trade mission met with government officials and business counterparts and formalized relations with the Argentine LGBT Chamber of Commerce. In October 2011 the NGLCC traveled to Bogotá to lay the groundwork for a future U.S. certified LGBT trade mission to Colombia.

NGLCC Global, a division of the National LGBT Chamber of Commerce, promotes the growth of small businesses and provides advocacy for broad-based economic advancement and empowerment of the global LGBT community. Through a variety of resources, NGLCC Global connects LGBT-owned and -allied companies, multinational corporations, and international affiliate chamber leaders and members.

In 2016, NGLCC launched NGLCC Global LGBTI Business Week. Hosted by NGLCC in partnership with leaders and organizations committed to expanding global LGBTI economic opportunity, this was the first summit of its kind to converge economic, public policy, and global human rights experts with the goal of shaping a more equitable world for LGBTI citizens. The findings of the week were presented along with awards for top achievement in LGBTI business at the NGLCC National Dinner in Washington, DC, on Friday, November 18, 2016.

NGLCC Global Affiliate Chambers include:

Argentina

- Cámara de Comercio Gay Lésbica Argentina (CCGLAR)

Australia

- Gay and Lesbian Organization of Business and Enterprise (GLOBE)

Canada

- Canadian Gay & Lesbian Chamber of Commerce (CGLCC)

Central & Eastern Europe

- East meets West

Colombia

- Cámara de Comerciantes LGBT de Colombia (CCLGBTco)

Costa Rica

- Cámara de Comercio Diversa Costa Rica (CCDCR)

Dominican Republic

- Cámara de Comercio LGBT de la Republica Dominicana (CCLGBTRD)

Mexico

- Federación Mexicana de Empresarios LGBT (FME-LGBT)

South Africa

- The Other Foundation

Sweden

- Swedish Gay & Lesbian Chamber of Commerce (SGLCC)

Uruguay

- Cámara de Comercio y Negocios LGBT de Uruguay (CCNLGBTU)

Ecuador

- Cámara LGBT de Comercio Ecuador (CCLGBTEC)
