= Robert McCune =

American football player (born 1979)

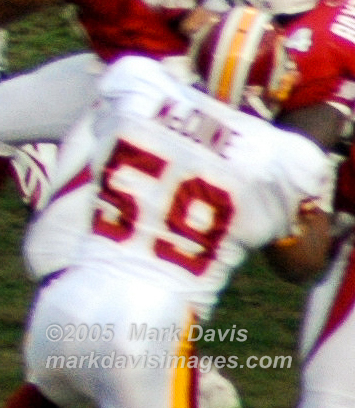
- McCune with the Washington Redskins in 2005

No. 58, 59
- Position: Linebacker

Personal information
- Born: March 9, 1979 (age 47); Mobile, Alabama, U.S.
- Listed height: 6 ft 1 in (1.85 m)
- Listed weight: 235 lb (107 kg)

Career information
- High school: LeFlore Magnet (Mobile)
- College: Louisville
- NFL draft: 2005: 5th round, 154th overall pick

Career history
- Washington Redskins (2005–2006); Miami Dolphins (2006–2007); Baltimore Ravens (2007–2008); Cleveland Browns (2009)*; Calgary Stampeders (2010–2011); Toronto Argonauts (2012–2013)
- * Offseason or practice squad member only

Awards and highlights
- Grey Cup champion (2012); First-team All-Conference USA (2004); Third-team All-Conference USA (2003)

Career NFL statistics
- Total tackles: 9
- Stats at Pro Football Reference

Robert McCune (born March 9, 1979) is an American former professional football player who was a linebacker in the National Football League (NFL) and Canadian Football League (CFL). He was selected by the Washington Redskins in the fifth round of the 2005 NFL draft. He played college football for the Louisville Cardinals. McCune was also a member of the Miami Dolphins, Baltimore Ravens, Cleveland Browns, Calgary Stampeders, and Toronto Argonauts. He is currently (2023) serving a 5-year prison sentence for health care fraud.

== Early life ==
McCune attended LeFlore High School in Mobile, Alabama, playing football for coach Ray Parker. He was a two-year letter-winner on the gridiron and four year letter-winner in track. He finished third at the state meet in the 100-meter dash and second in the 4x100-meter relay, and also won back-to-back state powerlifting titles as a junior and senior for LeFlore's Powerlifting Team

== Military service ==
After high school, McCune served three years in the United States National Guard - a component of the United States Army - where he spent six months stationed in Korea and six months in Kuwait.

== College career ==
After being redshirted at the University of Louisville in 2000, McCune was named Special Teams Player of the Year in 2001 as a key member of the kick coverage units. He logged 14 tackles (nine solo) while playing in all thirteen games on special teams and as a reserve linebacker.

In 2002, McCune played in every game, taking over middle linebacker duties in the final two contests against Houston and Marshall when starter Rod Day was injured. McCune recorded 48 tackles (20 solos) with 1.5 stops for losses of 4 yards and a quarterback pressure on the year.

McCune earned third-team All-Conference USA honors in 2003. He started every game at middle linebacker, leading the team and ranked seventh in the conference with a career-high 143 tackles (83 solos). He had four sacks for -11 yards and five stops for losses of 12 yards. He intercepted a pass and deflected five others.

McCune was an All-Conference USA first-team selection after starting every game at middle linebacker as a senior in 2004. He led the team for the second-straight year with 115 tackles (57 solos), including two sacks for -16 yards and four stops for losses of 20 yards. He returned an interception seven yards and deflected four passes.

Following the season, McCune impressed professional scouts by making big hits and showing aggressive play during Senior Bowl week.

He graduated with a degree in education.

== Professional career ==
=== Washington Redskins ===
McCune was originally selected by the Washington Redskins in the fifth round (154th overall) of the 2005 NFL draft. He spent the majority of his rookie season on the Redskins' practice squad before being promoted to the active roster on November 6, 2005. He played in five games and two playoff games, logging seven special teams tackles. He made his professional debut in Week 9 against the Philadelphia Eagles, and led the team in special teams tackles with three in a Week 10 contest against the Tampa Bay Buccaneers.

McCune struggled during training camp with the Redskins in 2006, with then-linebackers coach Dale Lindsey saying his development was "not where we want it to be." McCune was once again waived prior to the regular season in 2006 and rejoined the Redskins' practice squad. He remained there until December 12, when he was signed to the active roster of the Miami Dolphins.

=== Miami Dolphins ===
In Miami, McCune replaced veteran linebacker Keith Newman, who was waived the following day. McCune was inactive for the final three games of the season.

McCune was waived by the Dolphins following the 2007 preseason.

=== Baltimore Ravens ===
On November 14, 2007, the Baltimore Ravens signed McCune to their practice squad. He was later promoted to the active roster, recording four tackles in two games.

On April 7, 2008, McCune was re-signed as an exclusive-rights free agent. He was released during final cuts on August 30. The Ravens re-signed McCune on November 11 only to release him on November 20. The Ravens re-signed McCune on December 31 when wide receiver Marcus Maxwell was placed on injured reserve.

He was non-tendered on March 14, 2009, and became a free agent.

=== Cleveland Browns ===
McCune signed with the Cleveland Browns on August 20, 2009. He was waived on August 31.

=== Calgary Stampeders ===
The Calgary Stampeders of the Canadian Football League signed McCune on April 20, 2010. McCune was released on June 16, 2012.

=== Toronto Argonauts ===
On June 21, 2012, McCune signed with the Toronto Argonauts of the Canadian Football League. McCune finished the 2012 CFL season recording 86 tackles, and 1 interception for 3 yards. McCune would go on to win the 100th Grey Cup championship with the Argonauts that year.

In 2013, McCune finished the 2013 CFL season as the Argonauts' team leader in tackles with 99, four of them as quarterback sacks. McCune was unable to play in the playoffs due to an injury.

== Healthcare fraud case ==
Between June 5, 2017, and April 12, 2018, McCune submitted 68 false and fraudulent claims to the "Gene Upshaw NFL Player Health Reimbursement Account Plan" on his own behalf and on behalf of 51 other former NFL players. This Plan provided former players and family members reimbursements of medical care expenses that were not covered by insurance. The false claims typically sought reimbursement of $40,000 or more for expensive medical equipment such as hyperbaric oxygen chambers, ultrasound machines and electromagnetic therapy devices. None of this equipment was ever purchased or received. In total, McCune and his co-conspirators submitted approximately $2.9 million in fraudulent claims to the Plan.

On December 12, 2019, McCune was charged with one count of conspiracy to commit wire fraud and health care fraud, nine counts of wire fraud, and nine counts of health care fraud by the United States Department of Justice. He pleaded not guilty to the charges on January 2, 2020. He was indicted on the same charges, plus another count of wire fraud, another three counts of health care fraud, and three counts of aggravated identity theft in a superseding case on July 24, 2020. In September 2021, the Department of Justice announced that McCune had pleaded guilty to all these charges. In February 2022, McCune was sentenced to 5 years in federal prison. Thirteen other defendants were also sentenced for their participation in the nationwide scheme.
