= The Next Tycoon =

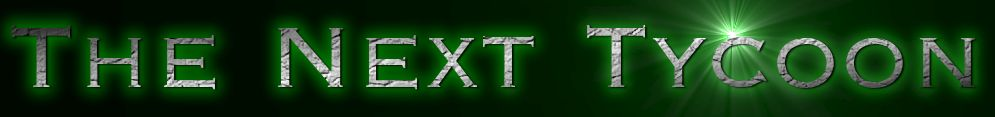
- Genre: Reality Show
- Created by: W. Cliff Oxford
- Starring: W. Cliff Oxford, Minoo Hosseini
- Country of origin: United States
- No. of episodes: 2

Production
- Executive producer: Minoo Hosseini
- Running time: 28:30

Original release
- Network: CBS Television

The Next Tycoon is a reality television series that was made in 2009 and originated in Atlanta, Georgia, by W. Cliff Oxford. As a televised business plan competition, the show features entrepreneurs who present their business plans in front of national business leaders to show what makes their business plan better than all the rest. Four finalists will then face a panel of media and business experts and a live audience. There is a group of judges and an alternate group called the School of Hard Knocks, which judges each contestant. The show is hosted by W. Cliff Oxford and Minoo Hosseini, while the judges and the School of Hard Knocks alternate per episode.

The series' first winner was entrepreneur Lisa S. Jones, who presented EyeMail Inc.

== Judges ==
- Salmeh Fodor
- Benn Konsynski
- Laura Colin
- Lydia Mondavi

== School of Hard Knocks ==
- Gary Kenworthy
- BB Webb
- Larry Colin
