= Bill Heard Enterprises =

- Industry: Automotive
- Genre: Auto dealerships
- Founded: 1919
- Fate: Filed for Chapter 11 bankruptcy in 2008
- Headquarters: Columbus, Georgia, United States
- Number of locations: 13 (2008)
- Products: Automobiles
- Brands: Chevrolet, Cadillac, Oldsmobile, Saab
- Revenue: $2.13 billion (2007)

Bill Heard Enterprises was a company based in Columbus, Georgia. Founded in 1919, it operated a group of automobile dealerships, primarily in the Southern United States. At its peak, the company operated dealerships in Georgia, Tennessee, Alabama, Florida, Texas, Arizona and Nevada. By 2008, Bill Heard Enterprises was the 11th-largest automobile dealer in the United States (and as high as seventh at the start of the 21st century), the largest in the state of Georgia, and the largest dealer of Chevrolet automobiles.

It abruptly ceased operations on September 24, 2008, as a result of the ongoing troubles in the subprime lending markets and slower car sales. At the closure, there were 13 dealerships in the Heard chain, plus one that had closed two weeks prior. Four days after the closure of its dealerships, Bill Heard Enterprises filed for Chapter 11 bankruptcy protection.

== History ==
=== 1919-1957: Beginnings ===
Bill Heard Enterprises began in 1919 as the William T. Heard Motor Company, where Bill Heard Sr. sold LaSalle, Essex and Hudson cars from a showroom in downtown Columbus. Heard founded the company using an inheritance from an uncle. In 1932, he began his long association with Chevrolet when he bought out a competing dealership.

=== 1958-2005: Expansion ===
Bill Heard Jr. joined the business in 1958 after attending Auburn University and a stint in the United States Navy. The younger Heard took over the company in 1961 when his father died. Heard Jr. undertook a massive expansion beyond its home state in the 1980s. The expansion, built primarily on the premise of selling large numbers of cars at low profit margins worked well in the boom times of the 1990s and the first decade of the new millennium. In advertisements, Heard dubbed himself "Mr. Big Volume" because of the stores' high sales volumes.

By 2005, the chain was at its peak, and Heard was a major figure in Columbus. A theater in the city's performing arts center was named for him, as was the street running past his flagship dealership. His advertisements were heard or seen frequently in media outlets in the cities where his company's dealerships operated. General Motors awarded BHE its highest honor, "Dealer of the Year."

=== 2000s: Controversy over business practices ===
The company's expansion came at a price, however. Much of Heard's business was built on customers whose financial situation meant they would not qualify for loans from traditional lenders, such as banks, credit unions and GMAC (now Ally Financial). Heard's dealerships were accused of using deceptive practices to entice buyers to purchase cars, or to qualify their purchases by not being truthful about their financial qualifications or the automobiles they sought to buy. The chain was also accused of using a fake "urgent potential recall notice" from GM to encourage previous buyers to purchase a new car.

The company was in continuing trouble with the Governor of Georgia's Office of Consumer Affairs, with enforcement actions taking place 15 times. The state also filed a lawsuit over the recall-notice affair; that lawsuit was still being contested when the company closed. In 2006 and 2007, the state reported (after an inquiry by the son of Heard Jr.) that BHE had 113 complaints filed against it by Georgia consumers, while the five largest competitors had a combined total of ten.

=== 2007-2008: Market troubles ===
In 2007, the Heard chain represented $2.1 billion revenue, much of which came from the sale of new GM products. That year, however, its dealerships began to post significant monthly losses as the domestic auto market faced a downturn. In 2008, dealerships posted monthly losses that ranged from $2 to $5 million.

The company had begun to encounter problems when the market for subprime lending diminished drastically, as a result of similar issues with lenders of subprime mortgages. This cut off both a source of much of its customer base, but additional income from fees paid to Heard by subprime lenders, often 2% to 3% of the sale price. On August 21, 2008, there was also an issue with GM's lending arm GMAC, where Bill Heard lost GM's line of GMAC credit with some stores concerning the financing of new inventory. About that same time, the state of Georgia announced its plans for legal action against BHE regarding the fake recall notice promotion. In August 2008, the company had seen a 26 percent drop of year-to-date sales since the year before.

By September 2008, Bill Heard Enterprises was the eleventh-largest automobile dealer in the United States (and as high as seventh at the start of the 21st century), the largest in the state of Georgia, and the largest dealer of Chevrolet automobiles in the United States. Automotive News also ranked it 13th among auto dealership groups in the United States.

=== 2008: Dealerships closures ===
With mounting pressure from lenders and regulators, the company first closed its Scottsdale, Arizona location on September 12. Twelve days later, BHE announced the closure of the remainder of the company operations, and the company abruptly ceased operations on September 24, 2008, closing its 14 Chevy dealerships and putting about 3,200 people out of work. Heard claimed the closures affected around 2,700 employees. It had five dealerships in Georgia, and six in other states including Alabama, Arizona, Florida, Nevada, Tennessee and Texas. Bill Heard Chevrolet in Sugar Land did stay in business, as of September 25, 2008. Warranties at closed dealerships remained valid at other Chevrolet dealerships.

The company attributed the closures to the rising price of fuel and an inventory overly focused on heavy trucks and SUVS during an economic slowdown. The Wall Street Journal described the shutdown "after 89 years in business" as "monumental because of [Heard]'s strategic importance to GM."

=== 2008-2009: Bankruptcy and dealership sales ===
On September 28, the company filed for bankruptcy protection in Decatur, Alabama. Debtors included BMW, J.P. Morgan Chase and GMAC (now Ally Financial), for debts of around $229 million. The company listed both debt and assets of $500 million to $1 billion.

Following the filing, Judge Jack Caddell of the United States District Court for the Northern District of Alabama set terms for Heard to find one or more buyers, to be approved by the court and General Motors. At the time it filed for bankruptcy, the company had already been in talks with various prospective buyers for individual dealerships. NASCAR team owner and automobile dealer Rick Hendrick was mentioned as a possible buyer, as well as a dealer from San Diego, California. Heard's dealership in Scottsdale, Arizona remained open while a new owner was sought, while by September 30, the Sugar Land, Texas dealership had already been taken over by a new owner.

The flagship store in Columbus, Georgia, located on "Bill Heard Parkway" (since renamed "Manchester Expressway"), was operating under new ownership, as Legacy Automotive, as of early 2009. The store changed hands again in 2018, being acquired by SON's Automotive Group of Alabama. SON's moved to a new location on Whittlesey Blvd in 2026, putting the original Heard facility up for sale.

Tom Jumper Chevrolet in Sandy Springs, GA was sold to the Jackson family of Sandy Springs Ford & Toyota in 2011, though the property would sit vacant until 2018, when RBM would move their Mercedes-Benz new car sales business to the location. Classic Collision would take over the former Tom Jumper service center and body shop on Trowbridge Road.

The Bill Heard locations in Sugar Land, TX, and Plant City, FL were acquired by Tom Durant of Texas-based Classic Chevrolet. The Florida store was renamed 'Stingray Chevrolet', while the Texas location adopted the Classic name. Durant's Grapevine, TX location succeeded Heard as the Nation's largest volume Chevrolet franchise.

Orlando-based Holler-Classic Automotive Group purchased the former Bill Heard property in Sanford, FL in 2010. Holler's Audi North Orlando location was the first to commence operations on the 28-acre site. Holler's 'Driver's Mart USA' used car dealership was the second location to open at the site, using the former fleet & commercial sales building. A Hertz Used Car Sales location operates out of the former Bill Heard pre-owned building. The Chevrolet new car showroom was demolished in 2017, after several years of being offered for lease, without attracting a tenant. The Carroll Cadillac franchise joined the site in 2024, with a new showroom completed in 2025.

Heard's Antioch, TN location was sold to a New Hampshire-based dealership group in 2007, and re-named 'Auto Fair' Chevrolet. The location was sold again in 2009, becoming 'Freeland Chevrolet Superstore'. The Collierville, TN location was sold to Sunrise Automotive in 2008, becoming 'Sunrise Chevrolet-Pontiac-Buick-GMC'.

RLJ-McLarty-Landers Automotive Group of Little Rock, AR purchased the Huntsville, AL location, re-opening it as 'Landers-McLarty Chevrolet'.

Private investment company Oak Point Partners acquired the remnant assets, consisting of any known and unknown assets that weren't previously administered, from the Bill Heard Enterprises, Inc., et al., Bankruptcy Estates on November 15, 2013.

== See also ==
- List of Georgia (U.S. state) companies
