= Paul Harris (American football) =

American football player (born 1954)

No. 52, 57
- Position: Linebacker

Personal information
- Born: December 19, 1954 (age 71); Mobile, Alabama, U.S.
- Listed height: 6 ft 3 in (1.91 m)
- Listed weight: 220 lb (100 kg)

Career information
- High school: Toulminville (Mobile)
- College: Alabama (1973–1976)
- NFL draft: 1977: 6th round, 159th overall pick

Career history
- Pittsburgh Steelers (1977)*; Tampa Bay Buccaneers (1977); Minnesota Vikings (1978); Tampa Bay Buccaneers (1978); New Orleans Saints (1980)*
- * Offseason or practice squad member only

Awards and highlights
- Second-team All-SEC (1976)

Career NFL statistics
- Sacks: 2
- Fumble recoveries: 2
- Stats at Pro Football Reference

Paul Christopher Harris, Sr. (born December 19, 1954) is an American former professional football player who was a linebacker for two seasons in the National Football League (NFL) with the Tampa Bay Buccaneers and Minnesota Vikings. He was selected by the Pittsburgh Steelers in the sixth round of the 1977 NFL draft after playing college football for the Alabama Crimson Tide.

== Early life and college ==
Paul Christopher Harris was born on December 19, 1954, in Mobile, Alabama. He attended Toulminville High School in Mobile. He was inducted into the Mobile Sports Hall of Fame in 2002.

Harris was a member of the Crimson Tide football team of the University of Alabama from 1973 to 1976 and a three-year letterman from 1974 to 1976. He earned Associated Press second-team All-SEC honors as a defensive end his senior year in 1976.

== Professional career ==
Harris was selected by the Pittsburgh Steelers in the sixth round, with the 159th overall pick, of the 1977 NFL draft. He was waived by the Steelers on August 31, 1977.

Harris was claimed off waivers by the Tampa Bay Buccaneers on September 1, 1977. He played in 14 games, starting two, for the Buccaneers during the 1977 season, recording one sack and one fumble recovery. He was waived on August 28, 1978.

Harris was then claimed off waivers by the Minnesota Vikings on August 29, 1978. He appeared in one game for the Vikings before being released on September 8, 1978.

Harris later signed with the Buccaneers again on November 14, 1978. He played in five games for the Buccaneers that year, totaling one sack and one fumble recovery. He was released on August 27, 1979.

Harris signed with the New Orleans Saints on January 22, 1980, but was released later that year.
