= Hadiyah-Nicole Green =

American medical physicist

- Born: St. Louis, Missouri, United States
- Education: Alabama A&M University; University of Alabama at Birmingham
- Known for: Cancer therapy, precision medicine, immunotherapy, nanotechnology
- Awards: Key to the City and the Historic Icon Award, City of Selma, Alabama; Research Advocate of the Year Award, Southern Company and Perennial Strategy Group; Distinguished Trailblazer Award, The National Coalition of 100 Black Women; Trailblazer of the Year Award, 100 Black Men of America; 2016 Root 100, The Root magazine; 2016 Power 100 as one of the "100 Most Influential African Americans" in the United States, Ebony magazine
- Scientific career
- Fields: Medical physics
- Workplaces: Morehouse School of Medicine

Hadiyah-Nicole Green (1981-) is an American medical physicist, known for the development of a method using laser-activated nanoparticles as a potential cancer treatment. She is one of 66 black women to earn a Ph.D. in physics in the United States between 1973 and 2012, and is the second black woman and the fourth black person ever to earn a doctoral degree in physics from The University of Alabama at Birmingham.

== Early life and education ==
Green was orphaned at a young age and raised by her aunt and uncle in St. Louis, Missouri. She was the first in her family to attend college.

After her high school graduation, Green attended a summer program in computer science at Xavier University of Louisiana. She received a full academic scholarship to Alabama A&M University, where she earned her bachelor's degree in physics with a specialization in optics and a minor in mathematics in 2003. She has spoken about how her experiences at Xavier and Alabama A&M led her to become a strong advocate for Historically Black Colleges and Universities (HBCUs) by giving her a chance to get to know herself and develop as her own person.

Green continued her education at the University of Alabama at Birmingham, where she earned her M.Sc. in physics in 2009 and her Ph.D. in physics in 2012. Her thesis, "A Minimally-Invasive Multifunctional Nano-Enabled Approach for Selective Targeting, Imaging, and NIR Photothermal Therapy of Tumors", was supervised by Sergey B. Mirov.

== Career and research ==
Shortly after she graduated from Alabama A&M, Green learned that Ora Lee Smith, the aunt who'd raised her, had been diagnosed with female reproductive cancer. Fearing the side effects of chemotherapy and radiation, her aunt chose to forgo treatment. Green cared for her aunt in the last three months of her life. Following her aunt's death in 2005, her uncle General Lee Smith was also diagnosed with cancer. While tending to her uncle, Green watched as her uncle suffered from the side effects of chemotherapy and radiation, which, to her, seemed little better than what her aunt went through. These experiences led to Green's interest in developing new cancer treatments.

It was after an internship at NASA that Green realized the potential use of lasers in cancer research. She wanted to use her background in lasers to target cancerous cells without hurting healthy cells. Specifically, she developed a method where lasers are used to "illuminate" the nanoparticles to create an image of cancerous cells and decrease the amount of time it takes to target these cells.

While conducting her doctoral research, Green was a member of the team that developed a laboratory method to insert nanoparticles into cancer cells while avoiding surrounding healthy cells. The tissue incorporating the nanoparticles heats up due to directed laser radiation, which then destroys the cancer cells. She first tested her ideas with cancer cells in a petri dish, then moved on to small animal models using mice. Her current research efforts seek to extend this nanoparticle treatment to humans.

Following graduate school, Green became an assistant professor at Tuskegee University in the Department of Material Science and Engineering. In 2016, she was recruited to Morehouse School of Medicine in the department of surgery and received a $1.1 million grant from the Veterans Affairs Historically Black Colleges and Universities Research Scientist Training Program to advance her laser treatment.

In 2016, Green founded the Ora Lee Smith Cancer Research Foundation in memory of her aunt. The goal of the foundation is to advance cancer treatment so that it is effective with minimal side effects. The non-profit foundation also aims to make cancer treatment accessible and affordable for all.

In November 2024, it was announced that Green was to be rewarded the recognition of the Presidential Lifetime Achievement award for her contributions to groundbreaking cancer treatment and research, as well as her dedication to being a leader in her field and serving her community.

Green dedicates much of her spare time to speaking to and mentoring young black students.

== Bibliography ==
- Lee GY, Myers JA, Perez SM, Singh KP and Green HN: "Cisplatin combined with laser‑activated nanotherapy as an adjuvant therapy for head and neck cancer". International Journal of Oncolology 2020; 57: 1169–1178.
- Green HN, Crockett S, Martyshkin D, Singh KP, Grizzle W, Rosenthal E, Mirov S: "A histological evaluation and in vivo assessment of intratumoral NIR photothermal nanotherapy induced tumor regression". International Journal of Nanomedicine. 2014 November 5; 9: 5093–102. PMID 25395847.
- Salaam AD, Hwang P, Poonawalla A, Green HN, Jun HW, Dean D: "Nanodiamonds enhance therapeutic efficacy of doxorubicin in treating metastatic hormone-refractory prostate cancer". Nanotechnology 2014 Oct 24; 25(42):425103. PMID 25277401.
- Salaam AD, Hwang P, McIntosh R, Green HN, Jun HW, Dean D: "Nanodiamond-DGEA peptide conjugates for enhanced delivery of doxorubicin to prostate cancer". Beilstein Journal of Nanotechnology 2014; 5:937–945.PMID 25161829.
- Frederick PJ, Green HN, Huang JS, Egger ME, Frieboes HB, Grizzle WE, McNally LR: "Chemoresistance in ovarian cancer linked to expression of microRNAs". Biotechnic & Histochemistry 2013 October; 88(7): 403–409. PMID 23672416.
- Green HN, Martyshkin DV, Rodenburg CM, Rosenthal EL, Mirov SB: "Gold nanorod bioconjugates for active tumor targeting and photothermal therapy". The Journal of Nanotechnology 2011; (631753): 753–759.
- Green HN, Martyshkin DV, Rodenburg CM, Rosenthal EL, Mirov SB: "A minimally invasive multifunctional nanoscale system for selective targeting, imaging, and NIR photothermal therapy of malignant tumors". Reporters, Markers, Dyes, Nanoparticles, and Molecular Probes for Biomedical Applications III 2011; (7910):79100-79109.
- Saini V, Enervold MR, Perez A, Koploy A, Perkins G, Ellisman MH, Green HN, Mirov SB, Zharov VP, Everts M: "Targeting nanoparticles to tumors using adenoviral vectors". Technical Proceedings of The Nano Science and Technology Institute Nanotechnology Conference and Trade Show: Biomarkers and Nanoparticles 2007; 2(4): 321–324.
