= Rasha Al Roumi =

Kuwaiti Businessman

Rasha Abdulaziz Al Roumi
- رشا عبد العزيز الرومي
- Born: Kuwait City, Kuwait
- Education: Kuwait University
- Awards: 2017 Businesswoman of the Year

Rasha Abdulaziz Al Roumi is a business executive from Kuwait. From 2013 to 2017 she was chair and managing director of Kuwait Airways.

== Biography ==
Al Roumi studied at Kuwait University, completing a bachelor's degree in insurance and statistics.

In 2014 Al Roumi was named Businesswoman of the Year by Arabian Business magazine.
