= Therese Tucker =

American businesswoman (born 1961/62)

- Born: 1961 or 1962 (age 64–65)
- Education: University of Illinois
- Occupation: Businesswoman
- Known for: Founder of BlackLine
- Title: Chairman and CEO, BlackLine
- Term: 2001-
- Spouse: Married
- Children: 2

Therese Tucker is an American businesswoman, the chairman, CEO and founder of BlackLine, an enterprise software company with a market cap of $2.17 billion as of 2018.

== Early life ==
She has a bachelor's degree in Computer Science and Mathematics from the University of Illinois.

== Career ==
Tucker's first job was with Hughes Aircraft as an engineer building fault detection firmware for surface ship sonar.

Tucker was the chief technology officer (CTO) at SunGard Treasury Systems.

In 2001, Tucker founded BlackLine, an enterprise software company. She took BlackLine public in 2016. Tucker was chairman and CEO until she stepped down in August, 2020. She is Founder and Executive Chair on the company's board of directors.

Following the BlackLine IPO in October 2016, her net worth was estimated at $140 million, based on her shareholding of about 13% in a company valued at $1.15 billion. In February 2020, Forbes estimated her net worth at $370 million.

== Award ==
- 2018: Forbes' America's Top 50 Women In Tech.

== Personal life ==
Tucker is married, with two children, and her husband works as a hospital chaplain.
