= Vendormate =

Vendormate, Inc. is a 3rd-party vendor credentialing firm primarily geared toward the healthcare market, and headquartered in Atlanta, Georgia. Vendormate is retained by other organizations with the need to keep track of and screen their suppliers, vendors, and contractors in a centralized database. When retained by a hospital or other company partnered with Vendormate, vendors and contractors who do business with that hospital must register online with their contact, legal, and financial information. Vendormate then conducts background checks, financial screening, and compliance/document monitoring on behalf of the Vendormate-partnered hospital or firm.

According to the company, Vendormate performs vendor credentialing for more than 500 hospitals nationwide. Customers include the University of Chicago Medical Center and the UMass Memorial Medical Center.

Vendor companies pay one fee for all vendor representatives that share a tax identification number (TIN or EIN) for a particular health system. Standard pricing ranges from $25 to $250. Some vendors refuse to pay to start or continue doing business with a hospital.

A graduate of the Advanced Technology Development Center, Vendormate is at least partially funded by the private equity firm Buckhead Investment Partners.
