= Miriam Witherspoon =

American politician

Miriam Denise Witherspoon (July 16, 1960 - April 21, 2009) was a member of the Birmingham City Council, serving as president pro tempore. She advocated for the disabled, including better Americans with disabilities act compliance after being paralyzed in a 1988 car accident while she was in law school.

== Early years ==
She was born and raised in Mobile, Alabama, the daughter of McKinley Dan and Claretha Witherspoon. She graduated from Toulminville High School Class of 1978. She earned a degree in political science and history from Alabama A&M University. She earned a law degree from the Miles School of Law, where she graduated as salutatorian. From 1989-1990, she was named Miss Wheelchair Alabama. She was injured in a car accident during her junior year in law school.

== Career ==
She was an attorney and representative for District 7 in the Birmingham City Council. After starting her law career in 1990, she served as counsel for senior citizens in Jefferson County. She served as executive director of the Senior Citizens of Alabama Inc.

In 2005 Witherspoon was the first person in a wheelchair to win a city council seat in Birmingham. The council's meeting area had to be retrofitted so that she could sit alongside the other council members.

== Death and legacy ==
She died after a sudden illness, in Birmingham on April 21, 2009, aged 48. She was succeeded on the Council by Jay Roberson.

The Council unanimously approved a proposal by Birmingham's mayor to name the proposed athletic complex at Fair Park in Witherspoon's memory.
