= BlackLine Systems =

American software company

BlackLine Systems, Inc.
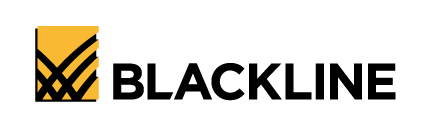
- Type: Public
- Traded as: Nasdaq: BL; Russell 2000 component S&P 600 component
- Industry: Software
- Founded: 2001; 25 years ago
- Founder: Therese Tucker
- Headquarters: Woodland Hills, Los Angeles, California
- Key people: Therese Tucker, (co-CEO); Owen Ryan (co-CEO); Patrick Villanova (CFO)
- Products: Financial software
- Revenue: $523 million (2022)
- Number of employees: 1,055 (2019)
- Website: www.blackline.com

BlackLine Systems, Inc., is an American enterprise software company that develops cloud-based services designed to automate and manage the entire financial close process as well as consolidation, invoice-to-cash, and intercompany accounting. The Los Angeles–based company has 17 offices worldwide.

== History ==
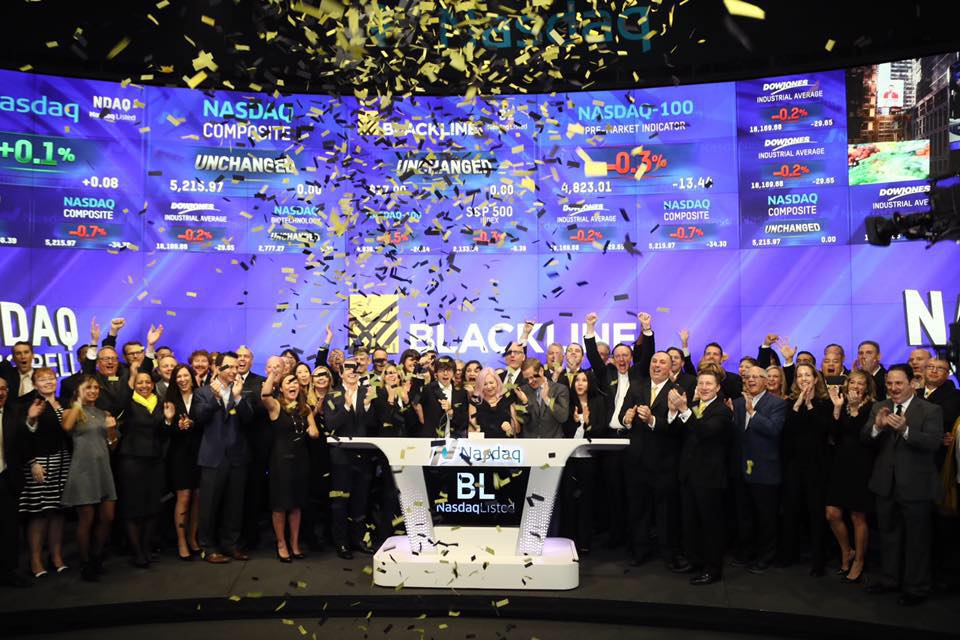
BlackLine IPO

BlackLine was founded in 2001 by Therese Tucker, a former CTO at SunGard Treasury Systems. The initial goal was to help customers replace their use of Excel with a suite of accounting software.

The company functioned with no outside funding until 2013 when the private equity firm, Silver Lake Partners invested more than $200 million in the company.

BlackLine reached an agreement to form a strategic alliance with the financial consulting firm McGladrey, in 2015. As part of the alliance, the companies began offering a business process as a service (BPaaS) platform.

The company's IPO was October 28, 2016; they're listed on the Nasdaq under the symbol BL.

=== Runbook acquisition ===
In September 2016, the company acquired its European competitor, Runbook for $34 million.

Runbook marketed a dashboard software application program for SAP; before it was acquired by BlackLine.

The software's "automation of recurring financial processes" adds "visibility and transparency" and strengthens "internal controls and compliance documentation" of data maintained by SAP.

=== SAP agreement ===
In 2018 BlackLine reached an agreement with SAP for the latter "to resell BlackLine's .. cloud-based finance and accounting solutions" as part of "SAP Solution Extensions."

=== Rimilia acquisition ===
In October 2020, the company acquired UK-based accounts receivable automation company Rimilia for $150 million.

Rimilia's cloud-based SaaS platform "uses AI to accurately apply payments to customer's invoices with any ERP system".

=== WiseLayer ===
In December 2025, it was announced that BlackLine had acquired WiseLayer, a New York–based artificial intelligence company specialising in AI agents for automating accounting processes. The transaction, for which financial terms were not disclosed, was intended to support the integration of AI-driven capabilities into BlackLine’s financial operations software.

== Operations ==
BlackLine provides software for more than 4,400 companies including Costco, Netflix, Coca-Cola, JetBlue Airways, Google, Kraft Heinz, Under Armour, Sirius XM Holdings. The company creates enhanced financial controls, in contrast to basic general ledger applications. BlackLine's software manages financial data, reconciles balances from sub-systems, ensures accurate and complete closings, and monitors regulatory controls through a system known as continuous auditing. The company's software is cloud-based, primarily running on the Google Cloud Platform, and meets ISO 27001 standards.

== See also ==
- Robotic process automation
