= Disadvantaged business enterprise =

A disadvantaged business enterprise is a business entity so certified in the United States by the government of the State in which it is located. SAFETEA provides that the Secretary of Transportation will provide uniform criteria for certification, and that at least ten percent of the amounts made available for any Federal-aid highway, mass transit, and transportation research and technology program be expended with certified DBEs.

== See also ==
- Minority business enterprise
