= Video email =

Video email, also referred to as email video or video in email, refers to the embedding of videos directly into the body of an email, without the need to attach files or click on a hyperlink to play them. Although video email providers have existed since the early-to-mid 2000s, it has become an increasingly popular medium for email marketing in recent years due to technological advancements, and is used to boost engagement rates. Several companies use video email to showcase their brand identity, send out newsletters, and announce events, product lines or launches. Examples of video email providers include EyeMail Inc., TailoredMail, MailChimp, Biteable, BombBomb, and SalesMail.

== History ==
In the 1990s, the burgeoning email marketing industry could easily send emails with embedded video, although few marketers produced video at the time. By the early 2000s, the rise of email-related security threats greatly complicated the possibilities of embedding videos. Marketers have long looked at video as a way to improve their promotional emails, although most efforts were initially unsuccessful, as Internet service providers (ISP) tended to block video messages due to concerns about spam and malware. In 2006, Lan N. Nguyen of The Wall Street Journal recommend using video-sharing sites such as YouTube so as to email video clips without "jamming your computer". In 2009, noting the growing popularity of social media, the same publication reported on a supposed "end of the email era", and also described video email as a "long-sought horizon for marketers".

Nevertheless, video in email companies already existed, such as the now-defunct Goodmail Systems (founded in 2003), one of the first companies to offer a service that embedded video in the body of an email so as to avoid security constraints, with events promoter Live Nation becoming one of its first clients. In 2009, Goodmail Systems attempted to "resurrect video in email" with the release of CertifiedVideo, although the project did not prosper as ISPs were slow to adopt the technology. Another example of a video email provider from the early-to-mid 2000s is EyeMail Inc., founded in Atlanta, Georgia in 2004 and still operating.

Since the mid-to-late 2010s, video email has been massively adopted by marketers, as producing digital video has become easier and less expensive due to technological advances. MediaPost stated in 2013 that "video in email finally works, is powerful, and is here to stay." Writing for Entrepreneur in 2019, Syed Balkhi noted: "Many email marketing services make it easy to embed video directly in your emails. Some can even pull a thumbnail image from your videos from YouTube or Vimeo as well as overlay a 'play' button icon on top. This is important because without this icon, some of your email subscribers may mistake your video for an image." Some examples of recent businesses that also offer video email services include Playable (founded in 2017), Dubb, and Binary Kitchen, which only allows sending webcam videos recorded within its website.

== Usage ==
Video email is an increasingly popular medium for email marketing and is used to showcase a brand identity, send out newsletters, and announce events, product lines or launches. In 2017, MarTech Advisor reported that adding videos to email content could boost click rates up to 300 percent. Recent advancements in technology have resulted in a resurgence in the use of HTML5 and video in email, as maintaining engagement is more difficult than in the past. Marketing director Jordan Cohen noted the importance of HTML5 in the popularization of video email:

HTML5 is a programming language that makes it possible to publish secure multimedia content on the Web without relying on plug-ins like Flash and QuickTime. Because it's a wide open standard, its uptake has occurred rapidly throughout the Internet ecosystem—including within some of the most popular email clients—and it's a safe bet to say that HTML5, and video-in-email, are here to stay.

In his 2014 book Big Social Mobile, David F. Giannetto noted that marketers who use video in email cite "increased click-through rates, increased time spent reading the email, increased sharing and forwarding, increased conversion rates, and increased dollars generated as the top benefits and visitors who view product videos are 85 percent more likely to buy than visitors who do not." Giannetto also noted that only one out of four marketers used video in email, with 43% of them stating that they did not due to a "lack of available video content". A survey conducted by the Web Video Marketing Council, Flimp Media and ReelSEO in 2013 found that around 93% of marketers used video in their marketing efforts, while 82% of them said online video marketing generated a positive impact on their business. The study also showed that 60% of marketers used video for email marketing, up from 52% in 2012.

According to Wyzowl's 2020 "State of Video Marketing Survey", 86% of businesses use video as a marketing tool, 87% of video marketers reported that video gives them a positive return on investment (ROI), and most marketers (63%) consider video engagement the top metric for measuring success. At the same time, email usage keeps growing, with the number of global users amounting to 4 billion in 2021 and expected to grow to 4.6 billion users in 2025.

== See also ==
- Electronic mailing list
- Electronic publishing
- History of email
- Marketing communications
- Mobile advertising
- Online advertising
- Social media marketing
