= Atlanta Tribune =

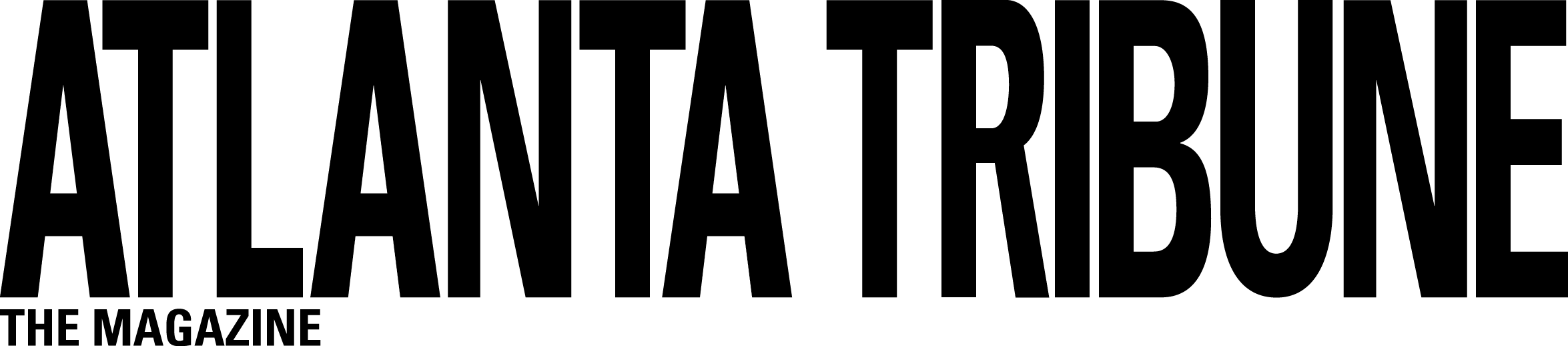
- Frequency: Monthly
- Format: News magazine
- Publisher: Real Times Media
- Founder: Kermit Thomas
- Founded: 1986
- Website: atlantatribune.com

The Atlanta Tribune is a monthly news magazine published in Atlanta in the U.S. state of Georgia, focused on the African American business community of that city.

== History ==
Kermit Thomas established the Tribune in 1986, and soon turned it over to George and Patricia Lottier, who built it up, and whose relatives own the Baltimore Afro-American. The paper focuses on a readership of affluent African Americans. The paper is now owned by Real Times Media, publisher of the Michigan Chronicle, the Chicago Defender, and the Atlanta Daily World.

The Rev. Darryl Gray, an alumnus of the Tribune, started the Black-oriented Provincial Monitor in Nova Scotia in 1990. In 2001 Frederick D. Robinson was appointed editor. The Tribune published weekly as of 2004.

The Tribune celebrated its 30th anniversary in 2016. A 2020 Wall Street Journal article noted that the Tribune "celebrated Coke in 2016 with a photo of 17 of the company's Black women executives," but that fewer than half of those executives remained four years later.

A previous publication with the same name was the subject of an investigation for improper fundraising in 1981; however, the papers do not appear to be connected.
