= Microsoft Innovation Center =

Organizations who have partnered with Microsoft

- Logo

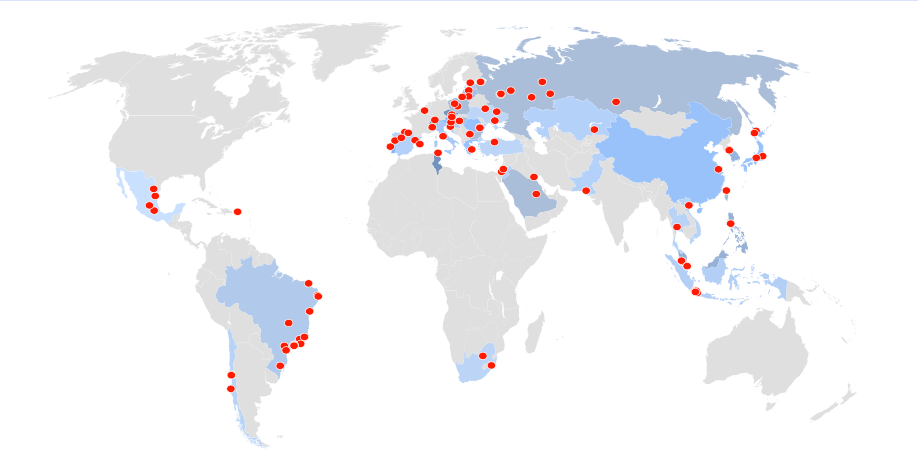
- Zone of influence
- Abbreviation: MIC
- Formation: 2002-12-01
- Dissolved: N/a
- Legal status: Association
- Headquarters: Virtual space
- Location: Around the world, 94 MICs
- Region served: Worldwide
- Members: Private persons, organizations, academic institutions, government
- Official language: En
- Program Manager: Michelle Chapman
- Parent organization: Microsoft
- Staff: 500+
- Volunteers: 1000+

Microsoft Innovation Centers (MICs) are local government organizations, universities, industry organizations, or software or hardware vendors who partner with Microsoft with a common goal to foster the growth of local software economies. These are state of the art technology facilities which are open to students, developers, IT professionals, entrepreneurs, startups and academic researchers. While each Center tunes its programs to local needs, they all provide similar content and services designed to accelerate technology advances and stimulate local software economies through skills and professional training, industry partnerships and innovation. As of 2014, there are over 100 Microsoft Innovation Centers worldwide, most of which are open to the public. Recently it was reported that Microsoft had proposed to build about 100 innovation centers in India, and several in China. Some innovation centers have also started to develop in Pakistan.

== Overview ==
Microsoft Innovation Centers are offering a comprehensive set of programs and services to foster innovation and grow sustainable local software economies. While each Center tunes its programs to local needs, they all provide similar content and services designed to accelerate technology advances and stimulate local software economies through skills and professional training, industry partnerships and innovation. Primary areas of focus include:

- Skills and Intellectual Capital: The Skills Accelerator focuses on intellectual capital and people enablement with software, business management and marketing courses, software development courses, and employment programs for students.
- Industry Partnerships: The Partnership Accelerator focuses on enabling successful partnerships by connecting people and organizations in the innovation ecosystem. The MICs do this by offering programs on partnering with Microsoft, and by cultivating local and regional industry alliances that support the growth of software ‘industry clusters’ and software quality assurance programs.
- Solutions and Innovation: The Innovation Accelerator focuses on enhancing local capacity for innovation through hands on engagements. This includes labs for ISVs, start ups, partners, students, and entrepreneurs.

== MIC programs and activities ==
- Imagine Cup
- Student to Business
- MIC Technical Trainee Program
- Business Skills Development
- Technical Skills Development
- Industry Cluster
- Prototype Development
- Business Incubator / Startup Incubation
- Microsoft for Startups
- Product Testing
- IT Academy
- Partner Showcase
- Technology Competence Center
- Executive Academy
- Developer Camps
- ITPro Deployment Workshops
