= Constance Jordan Wilson =

American urban planner

- Born: Constance Walker; May 1, 1951; Bridgeport, Alabama
- Died: October 1, 2022 (aged 71); Huntsville, Alabama
- Occupations: College professor, urban planner

Constance Jordan Wilson (May 1, 1951 – October 1, 2022) was an American college professor and urban planner. She was on the faculty of Alabama A&M University (AAMU), a historically Black university, from 1979 to 2019.

== Early life and education ==
Constance Walker was born in Bridgeport, Alabama. She earned a bachelor's degree in psychology from Middle Tennessee State University in 1973, and a master's degree in urban and regional planning from Fisk University. In 2000, she completed doctoral studies in political science at the University of Alabama. Her dissertation was titled "The origin and formation of the property rights interest community in Alabama and Mississippi" (2000). She was a member of the Alpha Kappa Alpha sorority.

== Career ==
Wilson was a senior community planner in Nashville from 1973 to 1979, where she developed transportation plans. In 1979, she joined the faculty of AAMU as an assistant professor of urban and regional planning. She specialized in transportation issues and their impact on minority communities. In 1988 she was head of the Department of Community Planning and Urban Studies, and in 1996 she became director of the Center for Urban and Rural Research. She helped to build and launch AAMU's Virginia Caples Lifelong Learning Institute (VCLLI), and was the institute's co-director from 2017 to 2019.

Wilson also had a private consulting firm, Progressive Strategic Planning, LLC. She was named Distinguished Professional Planner by the Alabama chapter of the American Planning Association in 2005. The Alabama Academy of Science presented her with the Emmett B. Carmichael Award in 2007. She was inducted into the Bridgeport Hall of Success in 2017.

== Publications ==
- "Problems and Obstacles Facing Paratransit Operations in a Small Urban Area" (1982)
- "Developing Local Support and Funding for Transportation Service in Rural Alabama" (1987)

== Personal life ==
Constance Jordan married Winston Wilson. She had a son, Michael B. Jordan. She died in 2022, at the age of 71. AAMU has a Dr. Constance Jordan Wilson Memorial Scholarship, endowed in her memory.
