= Associated General Contractors of America =

American trade association

- Formation: November 1918 (108 years ago)
- Type: Trade association
- Headquarters: 2300 Wilson Blvd., Suite 300
- Location: Arlington, Virginia, U.S.
- President: Thomas L. Brown
- Website: www.agc.org

The Associated General Contractors of America (AGC) is a trade association in the United States construction industry, with headquarters in Arlington, Virginia.

== History ==
The AGC was founded in November, 1918 to address problems identified during World War I. In 1912, the federal government asked the U.S. Chamber of Commerce to bring all industry associations together under its umbrella.

AGC's founding members attended a Chamber-led meeting in Atlantic City, New Jersey in the spring of 1918, but felt it was geared too much toward subcontractors. In the fall of 1918, the group that would later become the founding members met in Chicago and subsequently formed AGC. The group's first president was Daniel A. Garber.

== Membership ==
AGC represents over 6,500 of America’s general contractors, and over 9,000 specialty-contracting firms. More than 10,500 service providers and suppliers are also associated with AGC, through a nationwide network of chapters.

== See also ==
- National Association of Home Builders
