= Minority business enterprise =

Minority business enterprise (MBE) is an American designation for businesses which are at least 51% owned, operated and controlled on a daily basis by one or more (in combination) American citizens of the following ethnic minority and/or gender (e.g. woman-owned) and/or military veteran classifications:

1. African American
2. Asian American or Pacific Islander (includes West Asian Americans (Iran, etc.) and East Asian Americans (Japan, Korea, etc.))
3. Hispanic American - A U.S. citizen of true-born Hispanic heritage, from any of the Spanish-speaking areas of the following regions: Mexico, Central America, South America and the Caribbean Basin only. Brazilians (Afro-Brazilian, indigenous/Indian only) shall be listed under Hispanic designation for review and certification purposes.
4. Native American, including Aleuts

According to the Minority Business Development Agency, minorities own more than 8 million firms, and account for nearly $1.4 trillion in revenues.

MBEs can self-identify, but are typically certified by a city, state or federal agency. Over $300 million were paid to many who self-identify as Cherokee.

== Public contract bidding ==
Certain states within the United States, as a part of their bidding process, incentivize MBEs and women-owned business enterprises to bid on publicly awarded construction or service contracts. They may also declare that a percentage of the work performed on a contract be awarded to a MBE or women-owned business enterprise.

=== New York ===
In New York, the goal for the award of public contracts is to increase from 20% in 2014 to 30% by 2019. In 2018, the state was also considering establishing goals for the workforce of contractors awarded public contracts, but insisted these goals were not quotas. If contractors could not make a "good faith" effort to reach the goals, contractors might not be eligible for future public contracts for a length determined by the state.

In 2021, New York City expanded the certification to LGBT-owned businesses to qualify as minority-owned businesses to qualify for contracts.

== Controversy ==
In 2014, when New York increased its Minority and Women-Owned Business Enterprise (MWBE) goals for public contracts from 20% to 30%, the Association of General Contractors (AGC) sued the state for failing to release documents via New York's Freedom of Information Law (FOIL). The AGC was concerned that the state had not conducted a proper contract analysis before declaring the increase of the MWBE goal to 30%. The AGC stated that the 30% goal does not reflect the availability of MWBEs statewide. The AGC also questioned a later study - performed by Mason Tillman Associates Ltd. of Oakland, California - that was paid for by the state in consideration of its employment goals for state contracts.

There have been cases where contractors have been charged with crimes for impersonating MBEs. In New York, the owner of Eastern Building & Restoration was sentenced to 3.5 to 12 years in prison for fraudulently receiving over $800,000 from public construction contracts for impersonating as an MBE from the years 2012 - 2014.

== See also ==
- Black-owned business
- Woman owned business
- Disadvantaged business enterprise
- LGBT-owned business
