= Michael Simmons =

Michael Simmons may refer to:

- Michael Simmons (pioneer) (1814–1867), American pioneer
- Michael Simmons (priest) (fl. 1976- ), Anglican clergyman and academic
- Michael Simmons (RAF officer) (born 1937), British Air Marshal
- Michael Simmons (American football) (born 1965), American football player
- Mike Simmons (born 1983), American politician serving as an Illinois State Senator
- Mike Simmons (sprinter) (born 1956), American sprinter, 1975 and 1977 NCAA champion for the USC Trojans track and field team
