= Iron Bowl =

American college football rivalry

- Alabama Crimson Tide Auburn Tigers
- Sport: College football
- First meeting: February 22, 1893; Auburn 32, Alabama 22
- Latest meeting: November 29, 2025; Alabama 27, Auburn 20
- Next meeting: November 28, 2026
- Trophy: Foy–ODK Sportsmanship Trophy

Statistics
- Total meetings: 90
- All-time series: Alabama leads 52–37–1 (.583)
- Largest victory: Alabama, 55–0 (1948)
- Longest win streak: Alabama, 9 (1973–1981)
- Current win streak: Alabama, 6 (2020–present)

Locations of Alabama and Auburn

The Alabama–Auburn football rivalry, better known as the Iron Bowl, is an American college football rivalry game between the University of Alabama Crimson Tide and the Auburn University Tigers, both charter members of the Southeastern Conference (SEC) and both located in the state of Alabama. The series is considered one of the most important rivalries in American sports.

The rivalry, which started in 1893 and has been renewed annually since 1948, was played for many years at Legion Field in Birmingham, Alabama. In the early 20th century, Birmingham was the leading industrial city of the South, rivaling Pittsburgh, Pennsylvania, in the production of pig iron, coke, coal and the manufacture of steel. Thus, the term "Iron Bowl" came to represent the rivalry. Auburn Coach Ralph "Shug" Jordan is credited with coining the name—when asked by reporters in 1964 how he would deal with the disappointment of not taking his team to a bowl game, he responded, "We've got our bowl game. We have it every year. It's the Iron Bowl in Birmingham."

The game was traditionally played on Thanksgiving weekend, but in 1993, the schools agreed to move the game up to the week before Thanksgiving to give themselves a bye for a potential SEC Championship Game berth after the game was introduced in the 1992 season. In 2007, the conference voted to disallow any team from having a bye before the league championship game, returning the game to its traditional Thanksgiving weekend spot. Since the SEC went division-less starting in 2024, this game plays a role in determining the participants in the SEC Championship Game three times. With the elimination of the SEC Championship Game beginning in 2027, the series will return to its historic role as a direct, regular-season decider for conference standing and postseason positioning.

The rivalry has long been one of the most heated collegiate rivalries in the country. It is all the more heated because the two schools have been among the nation's elite teams for most of the time since the 1950s. Together, they account for 38 SEC titles, 30 by Alabama and 8 by Auburn. Both are among the most successful programs in major college football history; Alabama is third in all-time total wins among Division I FBS schools while Auburn is 13th. The two schools have been fixtures on national television since the late 1970s; the only time since then that the season-ending clash has not been nationally televised was in 1993, when Auburn was barred from live TV due to NCAA sanctions. Alabama leads the series with a record of 52–37–1.

For much of the 20th century, the game was played every year in Birmingham, with Alabama winning 34 games and Auburn 18. Four games were played in Montgomery, Alabama, with each team winning two. In Birmingham's Legion Field, tickets were evenly divided between the two schools. In even years, Alabama was designated as home team and Auburn was the home team in odd-numbered years. Auburn broke with tradition in 1989, opting to move the game to its home field, Jordan-Hare Stadium, for the first time. The Tigers agreed to play one additional game as home team in Birmingham in 1991 before moving its home games permanently to Jordan-Hare Stadium in Auburn beginning in 1993. Alabama continued scheduling its home games in the series in Birmingham through the 1998 season before moving its home games to Bryant-Denny Stadium in Tuscaloosa permanently beginning in 2000.

For many years, the game primarily aired on ABC, with CBS occasionally airing it instead. This ended in 1996, when the game moved to CBS full-time. The series returned to ABC in 2024, as ESPN and ABC became the exclusive television rights holders for the SEC.

== History ==
The contest became the extension of a bitter political debate which took place in the Alabama State Legislature regarding the location of the new land-grant college under the state's application under the Morrill Land Grant Act of 1862 during the Civil War Reconstruction Era. The state legislature, influenced by a heavy contingent of representatives who were University of Alabama alumni, pushed to sell the land scripts of 240,000 acres acquired from the Morrill Act or have any new land holdings held in conjunction with the University of Alabama in Tuscaloosa. The debate lasted over four years, until Lee County and the City of Auburn won the location of the new university in 1872, after donating more than a hundred acres and the remaining buildings and property of the East Alabama Male College. At the time of the Auburn decision the state legislature and governorship were controlled by Radical Republicans such as "Scalawag" Southern Republicans and Freedman African-Americans. By 1874, former Confederate and "Redeemer" forces from the Democratic Party gradually overturned the Radicals' control of the Alabama state legislature. The Democrats then attempted to overturn most legislation passed during the Reconstruction Period, including the founding of the new land-grant college at Auburn.

During the 1870s, Auburn (then named the Agricultural and Mechanical College of Alabama) which received no appropriated funds from the state, was on the edge of financial collapse. Collapse of Auburn meant that the University of Alabama could assume the remaining land scripts, thus profiting from the closure of the new land-grant college. The University of Alabama remained closed till 1871 following the Civil War, during which it was partially destroyed by Union forces. "By 1877, competition between the University of Alabama and the Agricultural & Mechanical College for patronage had intensified. In January, Auburn President Isaac Tichenor reported to the board of trustees that Alabama had reduced its tuition and lowered its graduation standards. Tichenor responded by requesting that the board drop tuition and create a boarding department to further lower expenses." The University of Alabama had developed a reciprocal interest in the Alabama Coal Operators Association along with their “Big Mule” allies with vast timber holdings across the Black Belt of Alabama.

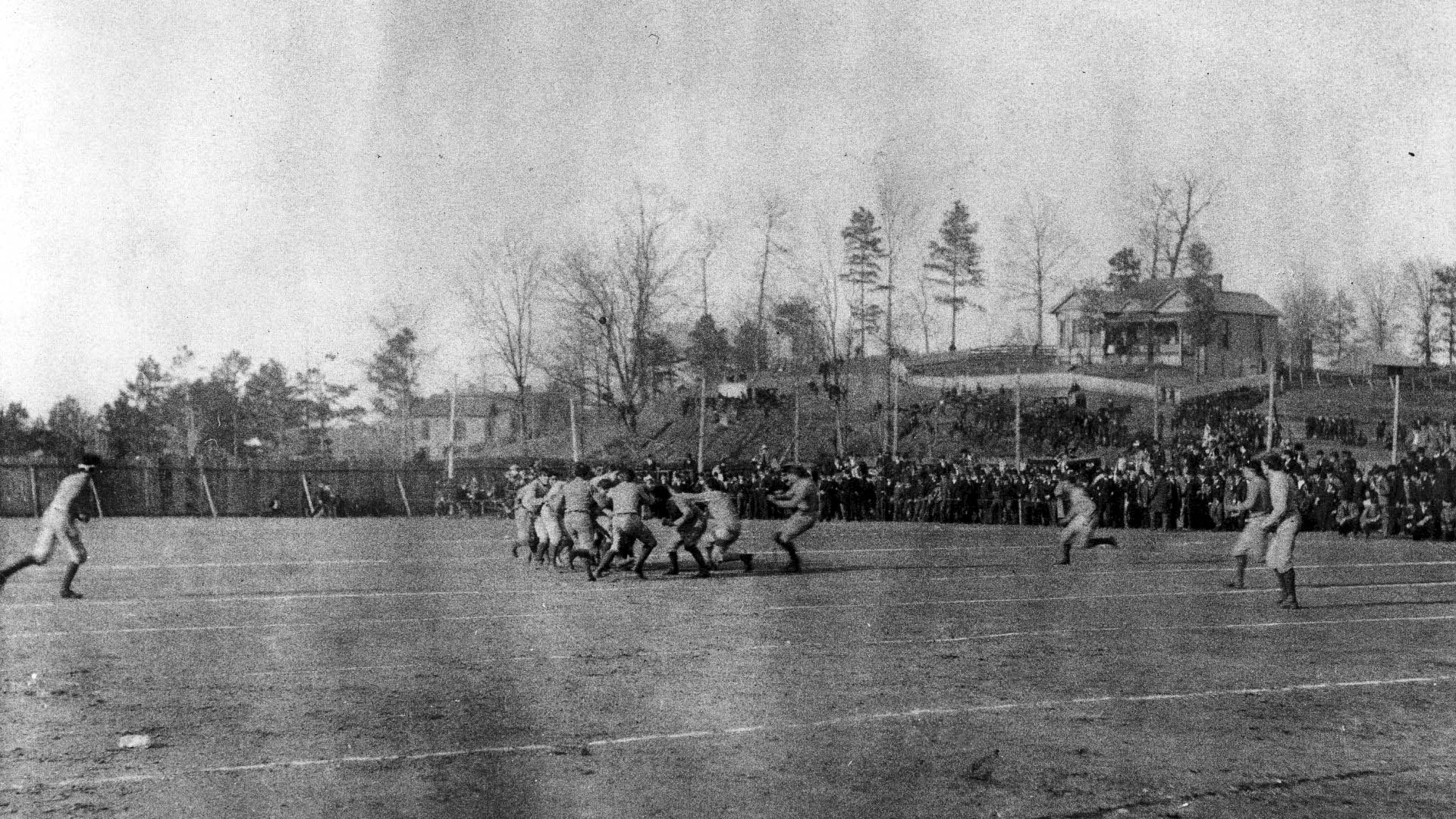
The very first Iron Bowl—Feb 22, 1893

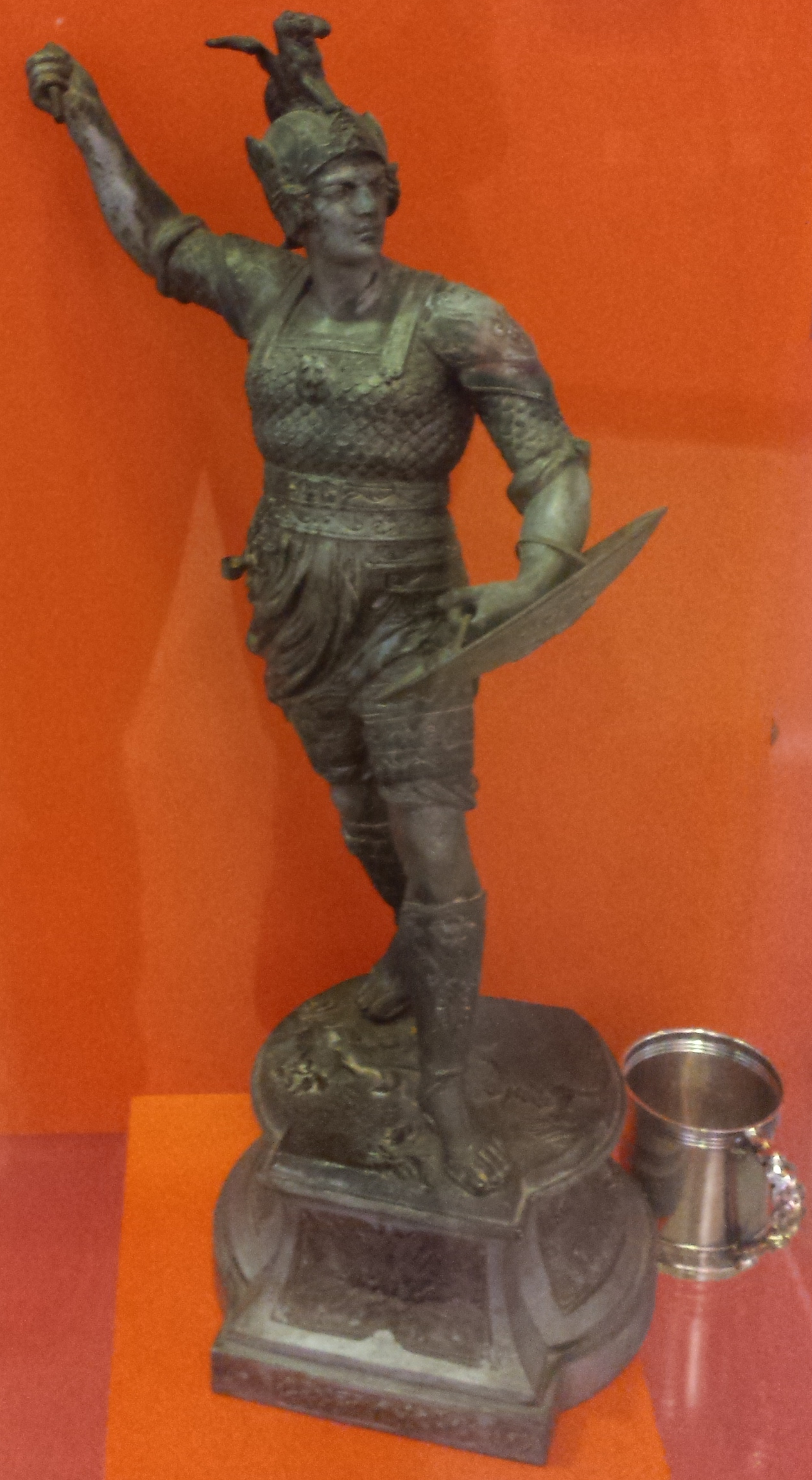
1893 Cup and Trophy

Alabama and Auburn played their first football game in Lakeview Park in Birmingham, Alabama, on February 22, 1893. Auburn won 32–22, before an estimated crowd of 5,000. Alabama considered the game to be the final matchup of the 1892 season while Auburn recorded it as the first matchup of 1893.

In 1902, a bill was introduced into both houses of the U.S. Congress to fund the creation of a "School of Mines and Mining Engineering" at each land-grant college. Under the provision of the bill, each participating land-grant college would receive $5,000 annually with $500 each additional year for 10 years. The University of Alabama secretly sent Professor Dr. Eugene Smith to lobby against passage of the bill or to amend the bill to allow other universities to participate in the federal program. Auburn responded by sending Professor C.C. Thach to D.C. to lobby with the Association of Land-Grant Colleges for a compromise to allow passage of the bill. The bill would later fail to receive passage.

During the 1907 state legislature session, a debate surfaced to move the land-grant college from Auburn to Birmingham.

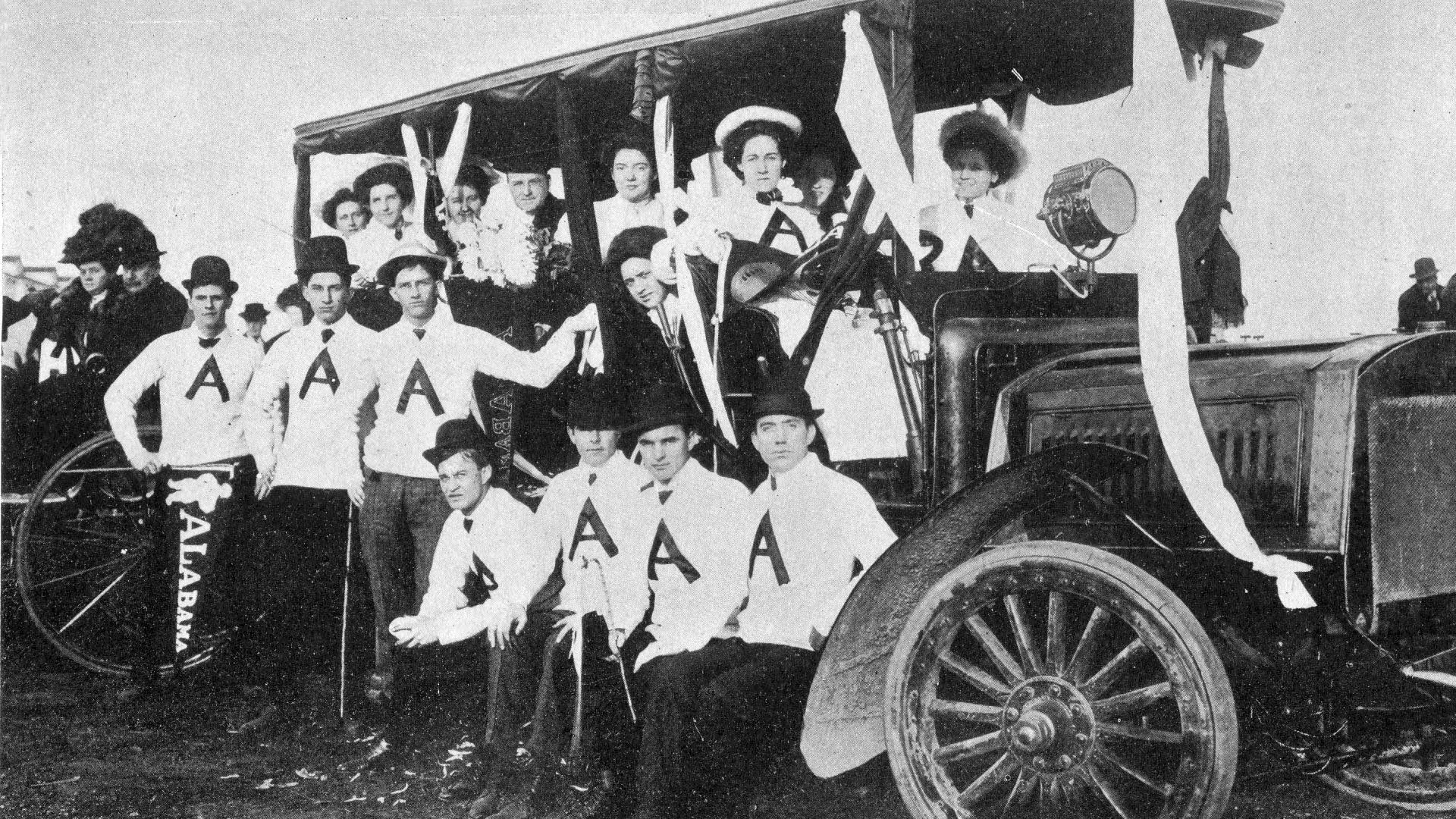
Fans of Alabama in 1907

One constant during the rivalry hiatus was Auburn's Coach Mike Donahue. Donahue became a fixture at Auburn, coaching football from 1904 to 1922 along with basketball from 1905 to 1921 while also ascending to the position of athletic director. The first basketball game between Auburn and Alabama was by chance occurring in 1924 in the Southern Conference Tournament. This would be the only basketball matchup till 1941 which again was by chance in another conference tournament.

During the 1930s and into the 1940s while the football rivalry was in hiatus, Auburn under the leadership of President Duncan, became the administrative home for several New Deal agencies: the Agricultural Adjustment Administration, the Soil Conservation Service, and the Resettlement Administration. The federal Government funding flowing into Auburn soon drew the ire of the University of Alabama trustees and their partisans in the Alabama Legislature. President Duncan was able to influence the placement of these agencies at Auburn due to his support for Governor Bibb Graves. Both the president and the governor supported the New Deal faction of the Democratic Party in Alabama. Graves was well connected in Washington D.C., with President Franklin D. Roosevelt and often lobbied in D.C. on "plum-tree-shaking expeditions". Meanwhile, Duncan with his connections in the Alabama Farm Bureau and as the director of the Extension Service exercised great control over the organized farm vote.

By the mid-1940s, the Democratic Party was splintering in Alabama, with the rise of the Dixiecrats and those who remained loyal to the national party. One of the most outspoken critics of Auburn was publisher Harry Ayers, who would later endorse Harry Truman in 1945. In 1940 Duncan had successfully opposed Ayers' candidacy as a delegate to the Democratic National Convention, which deeply offended the publisher. The Anniston editor had been a long-time advocate of consolidating Auburn and Alabama, "so that Auburn would become the dangling tail of a Tuscaloosa kite". In August 1942, President Duncan wrote to Raymond Paty, the newly appointed president of the University of Alabama, that the relationship between their two schools was "of such magnitude and gravity" that he had given the question more attention than any other problem he faced as president. He urged Paty that Auburn and Alabama should agree upon a funding formula that would give each institution the same appropriation per in-state student, an idea which worked against the University of Alabama's self-image as the state's capstone university.

During a 1945 legislative session, the University of Alabama's report to the commission (Alabama Educational Survey Commission) argued that the Tuscaloosa school had well-established and broad responsibilities for higher education in the state. Four times in Alabama history, higher education responsibilities had been delegated to other institutions. In three of the four cases, this occurred under a state government established during the Reconstruction period: creation of the normal schools, higher education for blacks, and establishment of the land-grant college at Auburn. The fourth case was the state women's college at Montevallo. In each case, this was argued to have resulted from "the illogic inherent in the evolution of a democratic government". The Alabama report drew a sharp response from then Auburn President Luther Duncan, who said that he had never seen "a bolder, more deliberate, more vicious, or more deceptive document". He predicted that if the friends of Auburn and Montevallo did not rise up to combat "this evil monster", it would consume them "just like the doctrine of Hitler". Duncan also remarked that according to Alabama, "Auburn is the illegitimate children ... born out of the misery of the Reconstruction period."

By 1945, with the end of World War II, the GI Bill had inundated Auburn (then officially named the Alabama Polytechnic Institute), with students—doubling enrollment twice between 1944 and 1948. With the increased enrollment, it was now obvious that Auburn would never "become so weak that ... it could be absorbed" by the University of Alabama.

In March 1947, the Auburn Board of Trustees, with Governor Jim Folsom in attendance, unanimously approved the following resolution, "Whereas, The Alabama Polytechnic Institute and the University of Alabama are important educational institutions of the State of Alabama and are maintained and operated by the people of the State; and Whereas, many years ago athletic relationship between the Alabama Polytechnic Institute and the University of Alabama was discontinued; and Whereas, intercollegiate rivalry between the two institutions would be conducive to a better understanding among students of both schools and would tend to promote interest in athletic engagements in Alabama, therefore Be It Resolved by the Board of Trustees of Alabama Polytechnic Institute in meeting assembled, that the President of the Alabama Polytechnic Institute, through its Athletic Director, make necessary negotiation with the Director of Athletics of the University of Alabama to resume athletic competition between the two institutions at the earliest possible date, and that a copy of this resolution be furnished to the President and Athletic Director of the University of Alabama." The Governor then suggested that the game be played not later than the first Saturday in December 1947. Also during 1947, the Alabama House of Representatives passed a resolution encouraging both universities to "make possible the inauguration of a full athletic program between the two schools". But the resolution did not have the effect of law, the schools still could not agree, the Legislature threatened to withhold state funding. In April 1948, Alabama president John Gallalee and Auburn president Ralph B. Draughon met and agreed to renew the series in 1948 and for the following 1949 season.

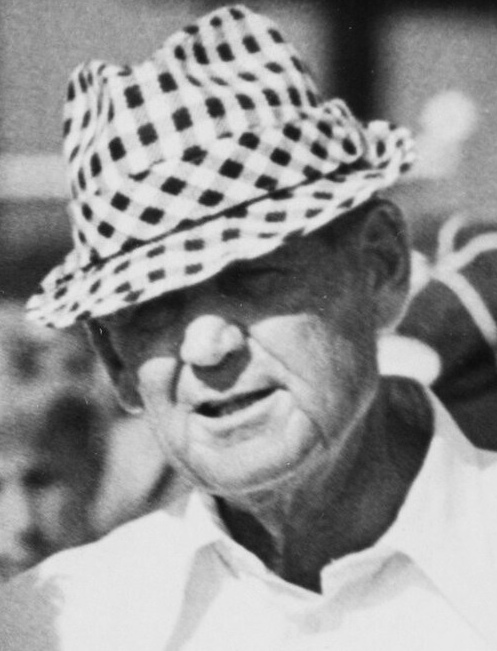
Legendary Alabama head coach Paul "The Bear" Bryant.

It was agreed that the games would be played as a neutral site series in Birmingham. Legion Field held 47,000 fans in 1948, dwarfing both Tuscaloosa's Denny Stadium (31,000) and Auburn Stadium (15,000; expanded to 21,500 and renamed Cliff Hare Stadium in 1949). Also, it is believed Alabama refused to travel to Auburn, citing poor roads and the small size of Auburn Stadium. Alabama was joined in this sentiment by the Tennessee Volunteers (who refused to play in Auburn until 1974) and Georgia Tech Yellow Jackets (who did not travel to Auburn from 1900 to 1970). Auburn played its last home game at Legion Field, outside of the Iron Bowl, in 1978 against Tennessee.

Between 1969 and 1987, Auburn made additions to Jordan-Hare Stadium until it seated 85,214 for the 1987 season, almost 10,000 more than 75,808-seat Legion Field. (Alabama's Bryant-Denny Stadium then seated a little over 60,000, but expanded to 70,123 in 1988.) By the late 1970s, Auburn fans began feeling chagrin at playing all Iron Bowl games at Legion Field. Despite the equal allotment of tickets, Auburn fans insisted that Legion Field was not a neutral site. While Auburn played many of their most important rivalry games in Birmingham for most of the 20th century (among those were Georgia Tech and Tennessee), Legion Field had long been associated with Alabama football in Auburn's eyes. Well into the 1980s, Alabama played most of its important games in Birmingham, to the point that most of Alabama's "home" football history from the 1920s to the 1980s actually took place at Legion Field.

Mainly for business reasons, Auburn began lobbying to make the Iron Bowl a "home-and-home" series. However, Alabama head coach and athletic director Bear Bryant would not even consider moving the Iron Bowl out of Birmingham, let alone play in Auburn.

When Pat Dye became Auburn's head football coach and athletics director in 1981, he met with his longtime mentor, Bryant. Years later, Dye recalled that at that meeting, "the first thing he said to me, very first thing, he said, 'Well, I guess you're going to want to take that game to Auburn.'" Dye confirmed that hunch, saying, "We're going to take it to Auburn." When Bryant noted that the schools' contract with Legion Field ran through 1988, Dye replied, "Well, we'll play 89 in Auburn." Although Auburn would have possibly been within its rights to move its home games to the Plains as early as 1983, Dye knew that Bryant was adamantly opposed to playing any games there. He knew Bryant's standing in the state was such that it would be folly to attempt making the Iron Bowl a home-and-home series as long as Bryant was still alive.

In the late 80s, after years of negotiations, the schools agreed that Auburn could play their home games for the Iron Bowl at Jordan-Hare starting in 1989 (with the exception of 1991) and Alabama would continue to play its "home" games at Legion Field. On December 2, 1989, Alabama came to "the Plains" for the first time ever as a sellout crowd witnessed Auburn win its first true "home" game of the series, 30–20 over an Alabama team that entered the game undefeated and ranked No. 2 in the country.

Alabama continued to hold its home games for the rivalry at Legion Field. Between 1987 and 1998, Alabama expanded Bryant–Denny Stadium to a capacity of 83,818, narrowly eclipsing Legion Field. Alabama then began moving most of its more important home games to Tuscaloosa, and finally their Iron Bowl home games to Bryant–Denny Stadium in 2000. That year, Auburn came to Tuscaloosa for the first time since 1901 and won in a defensive struggle, 9–0. A new attendance record for the Iron Bowl was set in 2006 as the latest expansion to Bryant–Denny Stadium increased its capacity to 92,138. The record was reset again in 2010, after another expansion to Alabama's Bryant–Denny Stadium, when a crowd of 101,821 witnessed a 28–27 Auburn victory.

In 2007, Alabama hired Nick Saban as head coach following his departure from the Miami Dolphins in the NFL.

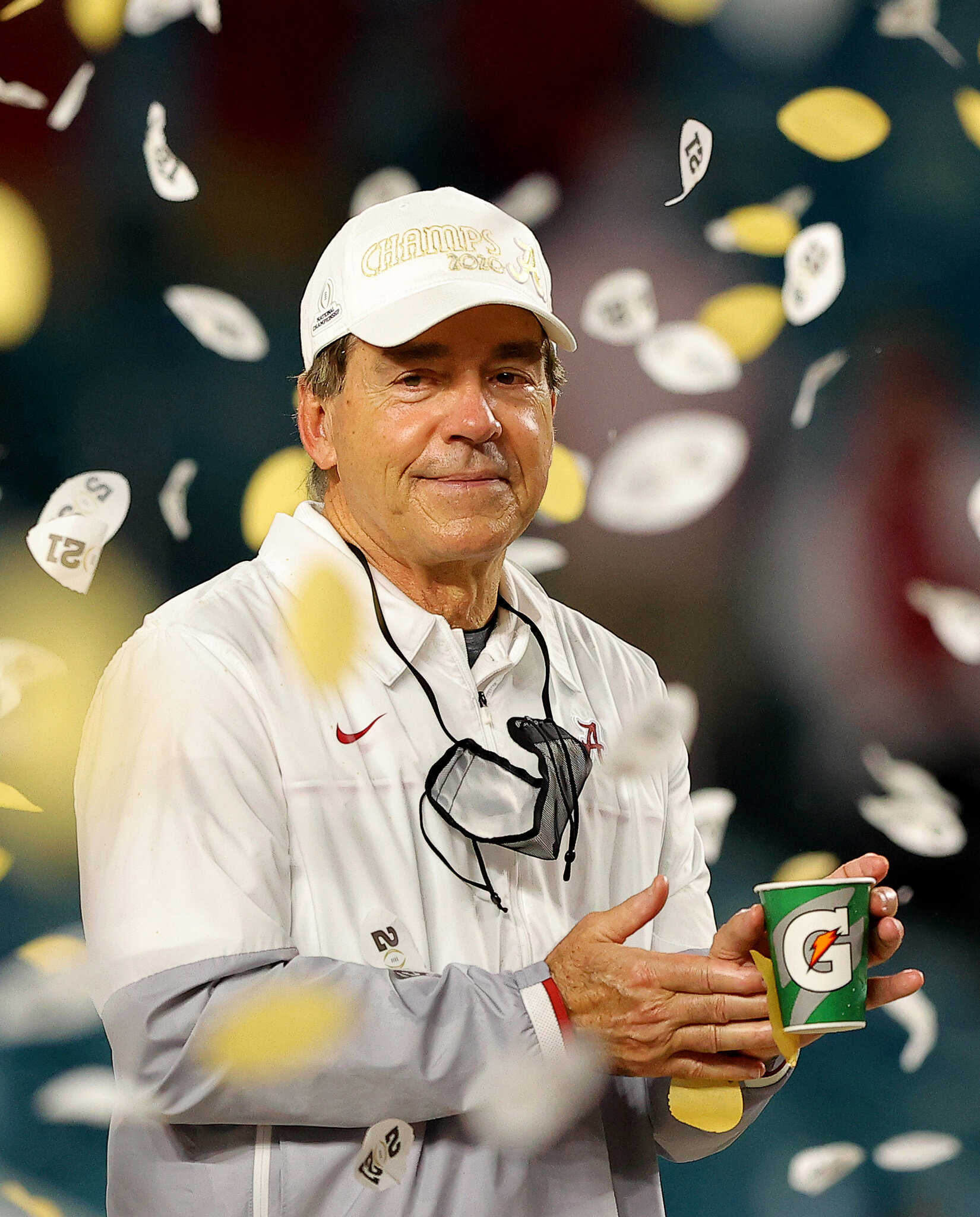
Nick Saban coached Alabama from 2007 to 2023.

In 2010, inside Bryant Denny Stadium, Alabama led 24-0 at the half before the game ended in a Tigers victory, 28-27. This game was the biggest comeback in Auburn’s history, as Quarterback Cam Newton led the Tigers to 21 unanswered points and propelled Auburn to win the National Championship that season.

The “Kick Six” game in 2013 was another memorable game for Auburn Tiger fans. No. 4 Tigers upset the defending Champion No. 1 Alabama 34-28 in dramatic fashion. With one second left and the game tied, Alabama's 57-yard field goal attempt fell short. Auburn's Chris Davis caught the missed field goal in the end zone and returned it 109 yards for a game-winning touchdown as time expired. The Tigers would win the SEC Championship game that year, and compete in the BCS National Championship.

2023's edition of the Iron Bowl marked the last for Alabama's Nick Saban as No. 8 Alabama defeated Auburn 27-24 in stunning fashion. In the closing seconds of the game, Jalen Milroe of Alabama threw a game-winning catch on 4th and 31 to Wide Receiver Isiah Bond. Bond after the game, coined the play "Grave Digger."

=== Broadcasters ===
In 2009 and 2010, CBS Sports and the two universities arranged to have the game played in an exclusive time slot on the Friday following Thanksgiving. The 2009 game was the sixth Iron Bowl to be played on a Friday and the first one in 21 years. CBS did not attempt to renew the agreement after 2010 due to criticism from both fan bases, returning the game to its traditional Saturday date. Although CBS has broadcast the majority of Iron Bowl games since 1996 through its SEC coverage, ESPN has aired the game several times, from 1995 through 1999, 2003, and 2007. In 2014, CBS's decision to broadcast the Egg Bowl due to a number of factors (which included contractual limits on how many times CBS may feature certain teams, and the larger prominence of the Egg Bowl due to its potential effects on Mississippi State's participation in the College Football Playoff) resulted in ESPN broadcasting the first Iron Bowl played in primetime since 2007.

== Foy–ODK Trophy ==
The Foy–ODK Trophy is named after James E. Foy, a former dean of student affairs at both schools, and Omicron Delta Kappa, an honor society on both campuses since the 1920s. In 1948 Omicron Delta Kappa fraternity sponsored the purchase of the trophy. The trophy is presented at halftime of the Alabama–Auburn basketball game later in the same academic year at the winner's home court, where the SGA President of the losing football team traditionally sings the winning team's fight song.

== Notable games ==
=== 1904: Donahue's first season ===
On November 12, Auburn coach Mike Donahue defeated Alabama in his first season, the purpose for his hiring.

=== 1906: Burks scores ===
Alabama's star running back Auxford Burks scored all the game's points in a 10–0 victory. Auburn contended that Alabama player T. S. Sims was an illegal player, but the Southern Intercollegiate Athletic Association (SIAA) denied the claim. Alabama coach Doc Pollard used a "military shift" never before seen in the south to gain an advantage over Auburn.

=== 1948: Rivalry returns ===
The rivalry resumed after being suspended for 41 years due to issues related to player per diems and officiating. Alabama beat Auburn 55–0 at Legion Field, which remains the largest margin of victory in series history.

=== 1949: Tidwell leads Auburn past Alabama 14-13 ===
When Travis Tidwell led Auburn defeated Alabama in 1949, sportswriter Zipp Newman wrote "There has never been a sweeter Auburn victory in all the 58 years of football on the Plains than the Tigers 14-13 win over Alabama."

=== 1964: First game on TV ===
In the first Iron Bowl broadcast on national television, quarterback Joe Namath led Alabama to a 21–14 victory over Auburn.

=== 1967: Run in the Mud ===
Alabama defeated Auburn 7–3 in rainy conditions at Legion Field behind Ken Stabler's 47-yard "Run in the Mud" for the game's only touchdown in the fourth quarter.

=== 1972: Punt Bama Punt! ===
Down 16–3 late in the game, Auburn blocked two punts and returned both for touchdowns, leading to an improbable 17–16 Auburn win and the coining of a new phrase among Auburn fans, "Punt Bama Punt!" In August 2010, ESPN.com ranked this game the 8th most painful outcome in college football history. Alabama would go on to win the next nine games in a row (1973–1981), known to Auburn fans as the "Reign of Terror".

=== 1981: Bryant becomes all-time winningest coach ===
Coach Bear Bryant earned his 315th career win after Alabama defeated Auburn 28–17. With the victory, Bryant passed Amos Alonzo Stagg to become the all-time winningest FBS coach at the time. This was the final game in Alabama's nine-game winning streak over Auburn, the longest streak in Iron Bowl history.

=== 1982: Bo Over The Top ===
Entering the game, Auburn had a nine-year losing streak versus Alabama. Freshman Bo Jackson leaped over the line of scrimmage on a fourth-down play from the one-yard line to score the winning touchdown.

=== 1984: Wrong Way Bo ===
Trailing 17–15 late in the game, Auburn had 4th-and-goal from the one-yard line. Opting to go for it, Auburn called a pitch to running back Brent Fullwood. Running back Bo Jackson, who was supposed to block for Fullwood, ran in the wrong direction, allowing the Alabama defense to easily push Fullwood out of bounds short of the goal line to seal the victory. The play and game are sometimes referred to as "Wrong Way Bo".

=== 1985: The Kick ===
Alabama beat Auburn 25–23 on a 52-yard field goal by Van Tiffin as time expired. A close game was elevated by the "epic" fourth quarter "with the teams trading haymakers and the lead changing hands four times." Alabama drove from their own 20-yard-line in the final minute, including a fourth-down flanker reverse to keep the drive alive. As recently as 2015, longtime sports reporter Paul Finebaum remarked, "It's still the greatest football game I've ever seen." The play is often referred to as "the Kick".

=== December 2, 1989 ===
On December 2, 1989, for the first time in the history of the series, the Iron Bowl was played in Auburn's Jordan-Hare stadium. Auburn won 30–20.

=== 1993 ===
No. 6 Auburn defeated No. 11 Alabama 22–14 to finish the season undefeated at 11–0. The game, at Jordan Hare Stadium, was not televised due to Auburn's probation but was shown on closed-circuit television before 47,421 fans at Bryant–Denny Stadium.

=== 1997: Holmes field goal wins it ===
Alabama fullback Ed Scissum fumbled on a screen pass that was meant to give the underdog Crimson Tide a game-sealing first down. Auburn kicker Jaret Holmes converted a go-ahead 39-yard field goal, and Alabama's last-chance attempt from 57 yards fell well short to give Auburn the SEC Western Division title. Auburn radio announcer Jim Fyffe is remembered by his dramatic call of the game winning field goal "long enough, high enough, It's good! it's good! it's good! it's good! it's good! it's good!"

=== 2000: First Game at Bryant–Denny ===
In the first Iron Bowl played in Bryant–Denny Stadium and the first played in Tuscaloosa since 1901, Auburn kicked three field goals to beat Alabama 9–0. This would be Mike Dubose's final game as Alabama head coach. It is also to date the last time Alabama has been shut out in any game.

=== 2010: The Camback ===
No. 2 Auburn defeated No. 11 Alabama 28–27 in Tuscaloosa after erasing a 24–0 deficit — the largest comeback win in series history — led by Auburn's Heisman winning quarterback, Cam Newton. "The Camback" preserved Auburn's undefeated season, which eventually resulted in Auburn's second national championship. This is arguably the most contentious meeting in the rivalry's history, with Auburn fans decorating Bear Bryant's statue with a Cam Newton jersey, and an Alabama fan, Harvey Updyke, poisoning the famous oak trees at Toomer's Corner.

=== 2013: The Kick Six ===
No. 4 Auburn defeated No. 1 Alabama 34–28. With one second remaining and the game tied 28–28, Alabama's freshman kicker Adam Griffith attempted a 57-yard potential game-winning field goal. The kick fell short, and Auburn cornerback Chris Davis caught the ball at the back of the endzone and returned it 109 yards for the game-winning touchdown as time expired in what became known as the "Kick Six" game. Due to Alabama's field goal unit being made up mostly of heavy offensive linemen, and strong blocking by Auburn, Davis ran untouched all the way to the opposite end zone as time expired to win the game 34–28, causing Auburn fans to storm the field in celebration.

The 2013 Iron Bowl won the ESPY Award for "Best Game" of the year in any sport, and the final play by Davis won the ESPY Award for "Best Play" of the year. Following the game, Alabama played in the Sugar Bowl, falling to Oklahoma 45–31. Auburn won the SEC Championship Game and went on to play in the BCS National Championship Game, where they lost to Florida State, 34–31.

=== 2014: High score ===
No. 1 Alabama defeated No. 15 Auburn 55–44, the highest scoring Iron Bowl ever. Alabama rallied from deficits of 26-14 and 33-21 to avenge the Kick Six defeat from the previous season despite allowing over 600 yards of offense to the Tigers. The Crimson Tide's 55 points are also the most scored by one team in the rivalry.

=== 2018: Tagovailoa scores six touchdowns ===
No. 1 Alabama defeated unranked Auburn 52–21, led by sophomore quarterback Tua Tagovailoa, who passed for five touchdowns and ran for one more. It would be the first time that an Alabama player would account for six touchdowns in a single game.

=== 2019 ===
In 2019, No. 15 Auburn defeated No. 5 Alabama, 48–45, in a classic back-and-forth match. After losing starting quarterback Tua Tagovailoa to injury a few weeks earlier, sophomore Mac Jones would be asked to step in against the Tigers. Alabama missed a game-tying field goal late in the fourth quarter, but forced an Auburn fourth down on the next possession with just 1:04 remaining on the clock. Auburn lined up in a formation with the punter out wide which confused the defense and led to an Alabama penalty for having too many players on the field. The five-yard penalty gave Auburn a first down and allowed the Tigers to run out the clock. With the loss, Alabama was knocked out of playoff contention for the first time since the creation of the four-team format in 2014.

=== 2021: Overtime ===
No. 3 Alabama defeated unranked Auburn 24–22 in a four-overtime game. Auburn starting quarterback Bo Nix did not play due to an ankle injury. After allowing seven sacks and committing eleven penalties, Alabama trailed 10–3 with 1:43 remaining. The Tide, led by quarterback Bryce Young, drove 97 yards for a game-tying touchdown to force the first overtime game in Iron Bowl history. (Although the rivalry game had been played 86 times, dating back to 1893, overtime in college football was instituted beginning with bowl games after the 1995 season.)

=== 2023: Fourth and 31 "Grave Digger" ===
On the 10 year anniversary of the "Kick Six," No. 8 Alabama defeated unranked Auburn 27–24. Alabama trailed 24–20 with a 4th and goal on the 31 yard line. Crimson Tide quarterback Jalen Milroe threw a game-winning touchdown pass to Isaiah Bond with 32 seconds left. The win gave Alabama its longest win streak against Auburn since they won nine in a row from 1973 to 1982. Bond later referred to the play as "Grave Digger," while others dubbed the play "Fourth and 31".

== Game results ==
Since 1893, the Crimson Tide and Tigers have played 90 times. Alabama leads the series 52–37–1. The game has been played in four cities: Auburn, Birmingham, Montgomery, and Tuscaloosa. Alabama leads the series in Birmingham (34–18–1) and Tuscaloosa (8–7). Auburn leads the series in Auburn (10–8). The series is tied in Montgomery (2–2). Alabama leads the series since it was resumed in the modern era in 1948 (48–30). For the first time in the series history, five consecutive Iron Bowl winners went to the BCS National Championship Game: Alabama in 2009, Auburn in 2010, and Alabama again in 2011 and 2012. Auburn also went in 2013, but lost to Florida State. Alabama's 2009 BCS National Championship followed by Auburn's 2010 BCS National Championship marks the first time that two different teams from the same state won consecutive BCS National Championships. One of the teams from this rivalry has gone to the BCS or CFP 12 times in 13 years from 2009 to 2021, with Alabama going 10 times (2009, 2011, 2012, 2014, 2015, 2016, 2017, 2018, 2020, 2021) and winning 6 (2009, 2011, 2012, 2015, 2017, 2020) and Auburn going twice (2010, 2013) and winning once (2010).

Alabama victories	Auburn victories	Tie games

No.	Date	Location	Winning team		Losing team	
1	February 22, 1893	Birmingham	Auburn	32	Alabama	22
2	November 29, 1893	Montgomery	Auburn	40	Alabama	16
3	November 29, 1894	Montgomery	Alabama	18	Auburn	0
4	November 23, 1895	Tuscaloosa	Auburn	48	Alabama	0
5	November 17, 1900	Montgomery	Auburn	53	Alabama	5
6	November 15, 1901	Tuscaloosa	Auburn	17	Alabama	0
7	October 18, 1902	Birmingham	Auburn	23	Alabama	0
8	October 23, 1903	Montgomery	Alabama	18	Auburn	6
9	November 12, 1904	Birmingham	Auburn	29	Alabama	5
10	November 18, 1905	Birmingham	Alabama	30	Auburn	0
11	November 17, 1906	Birmingham	Alabama	10	Auburn	0
12	November 16, 1907	Birmingham	Tie	6	Tie	6
13	December 4, 1948	Birmingham	Alabama	55	Auburn	0
14	December 3, 1949	Birmingham	Auburn	14	Alabama	13
15	December 2, 1950	Birmingham	#16 Alabama	34	Auburn	0
16	December 1, 1951	Birmingham	Alabama	25	Auburn	7
17	November 29, 1952	Birmingham	#8 Alabama	21	Auburn	0
18	November 28, 1953	Birmingham	Alabama	10	#16 Auburn	7
19	November 27, 1954	Birmingham	#15 Auburn	28	Alabama	0
20	November 26, 1955	Birmingham	#10 Auburn	26	Alabama	0
21	December 1, 1956	Birmingham	Auburn	34	Alabama	7
22	November 30, 1957	Birmingham	#1 Auburn	40	Alabama	0
23	November 29, 1958	Birmingham	#2 Auburn	14	Alabama	8
24	November 28, 1959	Birmingham	#19 Alabama	10	#11 Auburn	0
25	November 26, 1960	Birmingham	#17 Alabama	3	#8 Auburn	0
26	December 2, 1961	Birmingham	#1 Alabama	34	Auburn	0
27	December 1, 1962	Birmingham	#5 Alabama	38	Auburn	0
28	November 30, 1963	Birmingham	#9 Auburn	10	#6 Alabama	8
29	November 26, 1964	Birmingham	#2 Alabama	21	Auburn	14
30	November 27, 1965	Birmingham	#5 Alabama	30	Auburn	3
31	December 3, 1966	Birmingham	#3 Alabama	31	Auburn	0
32	December 2, 1967	Birmingham	#8 Alabama	7	Auburn	3
33	November 30, 1968	Birmingham	#15 Alabama	24	#18 Auburn	16
34	November 29, 1969	Birmingham	#12 Auburn	49	Alabama	26
35	November 28, 1970	Birmingham	#11 Auburn	33	Alabama	28
36	November 27, 1971	Birmingham	#3 Alabama	31	#5 Auburn	7
37	December 2, 1972	Birmingham	#9 Auburn	17	#2 Alabama	16
38	December 1, 1973	Birmingham	#1 Alabama	35	Auburn	0
39	November 29, 1974	Birmingham	#2 Alabama	17	#7 Auburn	13
40	November 29, 1975	Birmingham	#4 Alabama	28	Auburn	0
41	November 27, 1976	Birmingham	#18 Alabama	38	Auburn	7
42	November 26, 1977	Birmingham	#2 Alabama	48	Auburn	21
43	December 2, 1978	Birmingham	#2 Alabama	34	Auburn	16
44	December 1, 1979	Birmingham	#1 Alabama	25	#14 Auburn	18
45	November 29, 1980	Birmingham	#9 Alabama	34	Auburn	18
46	November 28, 1981	Birmingham	#4 Alabama	28	Auburn	17

No.	Date	Location	Winning team		Losing team	
47	November 27, 1982	Birmingham	Auburn	23	Alabama	22
48	December 3, 1983	Birmingham	#3 Auburn	23	#19 Alabama	20
49	December 1, 1984	Birmingham	Alabama	17	#11 Auburn	15
50	November 30, 1985	Birmingham	Alabama	25	#7 Auburn	23
51	November 29, 1986	Birmingham	#14 Auburn	21	#7 Alabama	17
52	November 27, 1987	Birmingham	#7 Auburn	10	#18 Alabama	0
53	November 25, 1988	Birmingham	#7 Auburn	15	#17 Alabama	10
54	December 2, 1989	Auburn	#11 Auburn	30	#2 Alabama	20
55	December 1, 1990	Birmingham	Alabama	16	#20 Auburn	7
56	November 30, 1991	Birmingham	#8 Alabama	13	Auburn	6
57	November 26, 1992	Birmingham	#2 Alabama	17	Auburn	0
58	November 20, 1993	Auburn	#6 Auburn	22	#11 Alabama	14
59	November 19, 1994	Birmingham	#4 Alabama	21	#6 Auburn	14
60	November 18, 1995	Auburn	#21 Auburn	31	#17 Alabama	27
61	November 23, 1996	Birmingham	#15 Alabama	24	Auburn	23
62	November 22, 1997	Auburn	#13 Auburn	18	Alabama	17
63	November 21, 1998	Birmingham	Alabama	31	Auburn	17
64	November 20, 1999	Auburn	#8 Alabama	28	Auburn	17
65	November 18, 2000	Tuscaloosa	#17 Auburn	9	Alabama	0
66	November 17, 2001	Auburn	Alabama	31	#17 Auburn	7
67	November 23, 2002	Tuscaloosa	Auburn	17	#9 Alabama	7
68	November 22, 2003	Auburn	Auburn	28	Alabama	23
69	November 20, 2004	Tuscaloosa	#2 Auburn	21	Alabama	13
70	November 19, 2005	Auburn	#11 Auburn	28	#8 Alabama	18
71	November 18, 2006	Tuscaloosa	#15 Auburn	22	Alabama	15
72	November 24, 2007	Auburn	#25 Auburn	17	Alabama	10
73	November 29, 2008	Tuscaloosa	#1 Alabama	36	Auburn	0
74	November 27, 2009	Auburn	#2 Alabama	26	Auburn	21
75	November 26, 2010	Tuscaloosa	#2 Auburn	28	#9 Alabama	27
76	November 26, 2011	Auburn	#2 Alabama	42	#24 Auburn	14
77	November 24, 2012	Tuscaloosa	#2 Alabama	49	Auburn	0
78	November 30, 2013	Auburn	#4 Auburn	34	#1 Alabama	28
79	November 29, 2014	Tuscaloosa	#2 Alabama	55	#15 Auburn	44
80	November 28, 2015	Auburn	#2 Alabama	29	Auburn	13
81	November 26, 2016	Tuscaloosa	#1 Alabama	30	#16 Auburn	12
82	November 25, 2017	Auburn	#6 Auburn	26	#1 Alabama	14
83	November 24, 2018	Tuscaloosa	#1 Alabama	52	Auburn	21
84	November 30, 2019	Auburn	#16 Auburn	48	#5 Alabama	45
85	November 28, 2020	Tuscaloosa	#1 Alabama	42	#22 Auburn	13
86	November 27, 2021	Auburn	#3 Alabama	24	Auburn	22^{4OT}
87	November 26, 2022	Tuscaloosa	#7 Alabama	49	Auburn	27
88	November 25, 2023	Auburn	#8 Alabama	27	Auburn	24
89	November 30, 2024	Tuscaloosa	#13 Alabama	28	Auburn	14
90	November 29, 2025	Auburn	#10 Alabama	27	Auburn	20
Series: Alabama leads 52–37–1

=== Results by location ===
As of November 29, 2025

City	Games	Alabama victories	Auburn victories	Ties	Years played
Birmingham	54	35	18	1	1893, 1902–1998
Auburn	18	8	10	0	1989, 1993–present
Tuscaloosa	15	8	7	0	1895, 1901, 2000–present
Montgomery	4	2	2	0	1893, 1894, 1900, 1903

=== Summary ===
As of November 29, 2025

Years	Games	Alabama victories	Auburn victories	Ties	Score
1800s	4	1	3	0	Alabama 56–Auburn 120
1900s	8	3	4	1	Alabama 74–Auburn 134
1940s	2	1	1	0	Alabama 68–Auburn 14
1950s	10	5	5	0	Alabama 115–Auburn 156
1960s	10	8	2	0	Alabama 222–Auburn 95
1970s	10	8	2	0	Alabama 300–Auburn 132
1980s	10	4	6	0	Alabama 193–Auburn 195
1990s	10	7	3	0	Alabama 208–Auburn 155
2000s	10	3	7	0	Alabama 179–Auburn 170
2010s	10	6	4	0	Alabama 371–Auburn 240
2020s	6	6	0	0	Alabama 197–Auburn 120
Total	90	52	37	1	Alabama 1,983–Auburn 1,531

== Coaching records ==
As of November 29, 2025

=== Alabama ===
Head Coach	Games	Seasons	Wins	Losses	Ties	Win %
Kalen DeBoer	2	2024–present	2	0	0	1.000
Nick Saban	17	2007–2023	12	5	0	0.705
Mike Shula	4	2003–2006	0	4	0	0.000
Dennis Franchione	2	2001–2002	1	1	0	0.500
Mike DuBose	4	1997–2000	2	2	0	0.500
Gene Stallings	7	1990–1996	5	2	0	0.714
Bill Curry	3	1987–1989	0	3	0	0.000
Ray Perkins	4	1983–1986	2	2	0	0.500
Bear Bryant	25	1958–1982	19	6	0	0.760
Jennings B. Whitworth	3	1955–1957	0	3	0	0.000
Harold Drew	7	1947–1954	5	2	0	0.714
J. W. H. Pollard	2	1906–1909	1	0	1	0.750
Jack Leavenworth	1	1905	1	0	0	1.000
W. A. Blount	2	1903–1904	1	1	0	0.500
Eli Abbott	5	1893–1895, 1902	1	4	0	0.200
M. S. Harvey	1	1901	0	1	0	0.000
Malcolm Griffin	1	1900	0	1	0	0.000

=== Auburn ===
Head Coach	Games	Seasons	Wins	Losses	Ties	Win %
D.J. Durkin	1	2025	0	1	0	0.000
Hugh Freeze	2	2023–2025	0	2	0	0.000
Cadillac Williams	1	2022	0	1	0	0.000
Bryan Harsin	1	2021–2022	0	1	0	0.000
Gus Malzahn	8	2013–2020	3	5	0	0.375
Gene Chizik	4	2009–2012	1	3	0	0.250
Tommy Tuberville	10	1999–2008	7	3	0	0.700
Bill Oliver	1	1998	0	1	0	0.000
Terry Bowden	5	1993–1998	3	2	0	0.600
Pat Dye	12	1981–1992	6	6	0	0.500
Doug Barfield	5	1976–1980	0	5	0	0.000
Ralph Jordan	25	1951–1975	9	16	0	0.360
Earl Brown	3	1948–1950	1	2	0	0.333
Willis Kienholz	1	1907	0	0	1	0.500
Mike Donahue	3	1904–1906	1	2	0	0.333
William Penn Bates	1	1903	0	1	0	0.000
M. S. Harvey	1	1902	1	0	0	1.000
Walter H. Watkins	2	1900–1901	2	0	0	1.000
John Heisman	1	1895–1899	1	0	0	1.000
Forrest M. Hall	1	1894	0	1	0	0.000
George Roy Harvey	1	1893	1	0	0	1.000
D. M. Balliet	1	1893	1	0	0	1.000

== See also ==
- List of NCAA college football rivalry games
- Alabama–Auburn men's basketball rivalry
