= Alabama Baptist Association =

Former American association of Baptist churches

The Alabama Baptist Association (ABA) was an association of Baptist churches founded on 15 December 1819 by four churches: the Antioch Baptist Church (of Montgomery County, Alabama) and the Baptist churches of Old Elam (also named Elim), Bethel, and Rehoboth.

Of these four churches, three were founded by James McLemore, a preacher who had come to Alabama by way of Georgia; only the Rehoboth church was founded by another man, Lee Compere, who later founded the First Baptist Church in downtown Montgomery, but Compere may have been recruited by McLemore. The latter's family continues to be a prominent family in Montgomery: the campus of Auburn University at Montgomery is built on 500 acres of the former McLemore plantation.

From the beginning the ABA was focused on missionary activity, founding churches in different counties, and had a strong representation at the 1823 foundation of the Southern Baptist Convention, supplying six of the fourteen delegates from the state of Alabama. According to historian Wayne Flynt the ABA "dominated state Baptist life". By 1832 the association had 28 churches in six counties. But not every Baptist church in the state was pro-mission, and in the late 1820s anti-missionary influences were found in almost every church in the association. A vote in 1838 on missionary societies failed to carry the majority, but as a result seventeen churches left to form the Ebenezer Association, leaving the association with twenty-three missionary churches.

In 1825 the association procured the enslaved Caesar Blackwell, "who was commissioned to preach and baptize converts in the slave community" and preached to both black and white people. Blackwell cost $625, and lived with James McLemore, founder of the Elim, Bethel, and Antioch churches; McLemore already owned Caesar's wife and child. The ABA's missionary efforts among the state's African-American population was an important factor in the doubling of the congregation reported between 1845 and 1860; in 1847, the congregation numbered 3,537 people, including 1,790 black members. In 1850, it issued a directive imploring the instruction of enslaved people—as a means of control as well as out of Christian compassion. After 1860, however, more and more Baptist associations across the state were having separate services for black congregations, and so did the ABA, which in 1867 advised its member churches to "encourage blacks to form their congregations 'under the direction and supervision of their white brethren'".
