= James E. Martin =

American university administrator

16th President of the University of Arkansas
- In office 1980–1984
- Preceded by: Charles E. Bishop

James Everett Martin (June 22, 1932 – June 3, 2017) was the President of the University of Arkansas from 1980 to 1984, and of Auburn University from 1984 to 1992.

== Biography ==
James Everett Martin was born on June 22, 1932, in Vinemont, Alabama. He graduated from Auburn University with a B.S. in 1954, an M.A. from North Carolina State University in 1956 and a PhD from Iowa State University in 1962.

He was a professor at Oklahoma State University and the University of Maryland. He served as Dean of Agriculture and Life Sciences at Virginia Polytechnic Institute and State University. In 1975, he was appointed as vice president for the Division of Agriculture at the University of Arkansas. He was then its president from 1980 to 1982, and became the first president of the University of Arkansas System from 1982 to 1984. From 1984 to 1992, he served as the President of Auburn University until he retired.

He was a member of the Auburn Rotary Club. The James E. Martin Aquatics Center is named after him.

During his college days at Auburn, James met an Auburn cheerleader named Ann Freeman. They later married and had three children, and five grandchildren.

He died on June 3, 2017, at the age of 84.

Academic offices
Preceded by Wilford S. Bailey	President of Auburn University; 1984–1992	Succeeded by William Muse
