= Wilford S. Bailey =

Wilford S. Bailey (March 2, 1921 – October 7, 2000) was the President of Auburn University from 1983 to 1984.

== Biography ==
Wilford S. Bailey was a professor at Auburn University. In 1965, he was the vice-president of the American Society of Parasitologists. He was the President of Auburn University from 1983 to 1984. From 1987 to 1988, he served as the President of the National Collegiate Athletic Association. He was also a member of the Alabama Commission on Higher Education. In 1984, he received the Distinguished Service Award from the Alabama Veterinary Medical Association He was a member of the Alpha Phi Omega fraternity. He was also the President of the American Society of Tropical Medicine and Hygiene and the first secretary of the World Association of Veterinary Parasitologists.

== Bibliography ==
- Athletics and Academe: An Anatomy of Abuses and a Prescription for Reform (co-written with Taylor D. Littleton, 1991)

Academic offices
Preceded by Hanley Funderburk	President of Auburn University; 1983–1984	Succeeded by James E. Martin
