= HIP Haiti =

American humanitarian organization

HIP Haiti, an acronym of Humanitarians Initiating Progress in Haiti, is an American non-profit organization established in 2008 by Anne Jordan-Reynolds and her daughter Stephanie Reynolds, of Montgomery, Alabama. The organization supports a school and a medical clinic in Coco Beach, Haiti, and has started the Vanilla Project, which aims to support the local economy in a sustainable manner by growing vanilla beans.

== History ==
=== School ===
HIP Haiti originated in a private project started in 2001 by Jordan-Reynolds, who founded a school in the remote village of Coco Beach--in 2000 she and her daughter Stephanie had accidentally crossed from the Dominican Republic, where they were vacationing, into Haiti, and took an interest in the area while waiting for permission to re-enter the Dominican Republic. Jordan-Reynolds is a professor at Auburn Montgomery. The school now enrolls three hundred students in primary and secondary education, and employs eight full-time teachers. It also supports a medical clinic. In 2008, the school was accepted into the World Food Programme's School Feeding Program, and began providing students two meals per day.

HIP Haiti was established by Jordan-Reynolds and her daughter Stephanie (a graduate of Auburn Montgomery, with a master's in African-American Caribbean studies from Tulane University) as a non-profit to aid in raising funds for the projects.

=== The Vanilla Project ===
The Vanilla Project was started with the help of a vanilla farmer in Costa Rica. A test crop was successfully grown and vines were brought to Coco Beach. Villagers were trained in growing the crops, and until it is productive, the sale of Rainforest Vanilla from Costa Rica supports the local economy.

=== Earthquake relief ===
By chance, Jordan-Reynolds and her daughter escaped near death during the 2010 Haiti earthquake; they would have checked into the now-destroyed Hotel Montana in Port-au-Prince but decided, the night before the earthquake, to go to Cap-Haïtien instead to pick up supplies; because of "a minor glitch in their plans" they caught the last flight out of Port-au-Prince. Since then, they have been working to collect money and supplies for earthquake relief.

=== Cocoa ===
The Reynoldses started De la Sol, "from the soil", to produce cocoa beans; by 2013 they had opened a processing plant in northern Haiti, employing eight people and processing cocoa beans from 650 farmers. The company is located in Plaisance, in northern Haiti. The cocoa butter is sold locally, while the cocoa powder is sold to an ice cream company in Baltimore, Taharka Brothers.
