= Barbara Wiedemann =

American poet (born 1945)

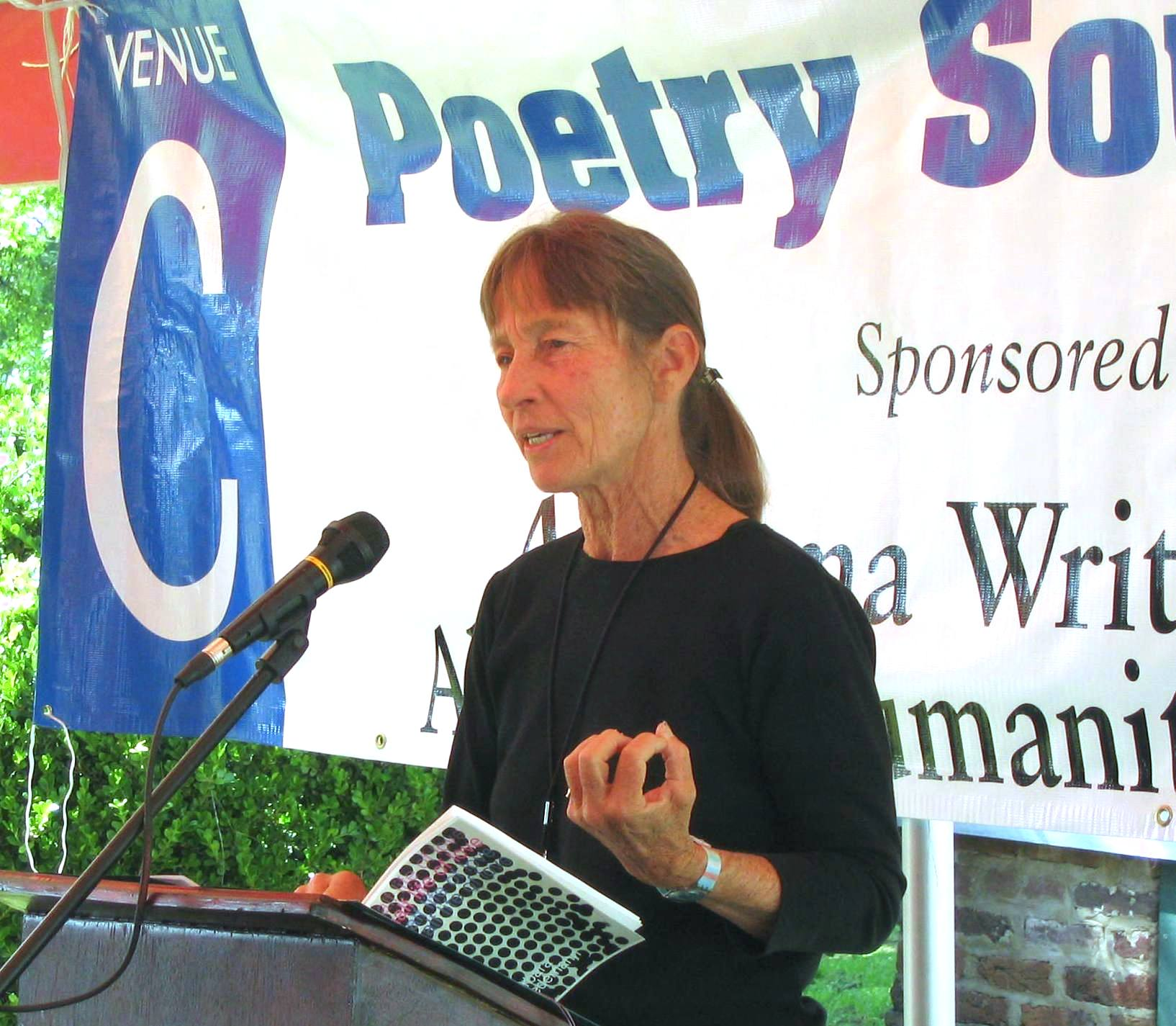
- Barbara Wiedemann reads at the 2009 Montgomery Bookfest
- Born: October 30, 1945 (age 81); Somerville, New Jersey

Barbara Wiedemann (born October 30, 1945) is an American poet. She has published four books of poetry, besides a number of poems in literary journals. She is the author of one monograph and co-editor of two critical studies. She was formerly a professor of English literature at Auburn University at Montgomery.

== Early life ==
Barbara Wiedemann was born on October 30, 1945, and grew up in upstate New York. She received her Ph.D. from the University of South Florida.

== Poetry ==
Wiedemann has published poems in a number of journals, including Kaleidoscope, Kerf, Poetry Motel, and Acorn. Four of her collections were published by Finishing Line Press: Half-Life of Love (2008), Sometime in October (2013), Death of a Pope and Other Poems (2012), and Desert Meditations (2018).

== Critical studies ==
Wiedemann has authored a critical study, Josephine Herbst's Short Fiction: A Window to Her Life and Times, on the work of Josephine Herbst, the radical American writer, and is the co-editor of two books, Short Fiction: A Critical Companion and "My Name Was Martha": A Renaissance Woman's Autobiographical Poem. The latter is the first edition of a 1632 autobiographical poem, 110 lines long, by Martha Moulsworth—one of the first such poems in English, which was included in the seventh edition of the Norton Anthology of English Literature.

Her essay on Hélène Cixous and Marguerite Duras, "The Search for an Authentic Voice: Hélène Cixous and Marguerite Duras", was reprinted in the collection Marguerite Duras Lives On.

== Selected works ==
- Wiedemann, Barbara (2018). Desert Meditations. Finishing Line Press. ISBN 978-1-63534-440-0.
- Wiedemann, Barbara (2013). The Death of a Pope and Other Poems. Finishing Line Press. ISBN 978-1-62229-318-6.
- Wiedemann, Barbara (2010). Sometime in October. Finishing Line Press. ISBN 978-1-59924677-2.
- Wiedemann, Barbara (2008). Half-Life of Love. Finishing Line Press. ISBN 978-1-59924-144-9. (poetry).
- Wiedemann, Barbara (1998). Josephine Herbst's Short Fiction: A Window to Her Life and Times. Susquehanna UP. ISBN 978-1-57591-007-9. (monograph).
- Evans, Robert C.; Anne Little; Barbara Wiedemann (1997). Short Fiction: A Critical Companion. West Cornwall: Locust Hill Press. ISBN 978-0-933951-73-0. (edited collection).
- Evans, Robert C.; Barbara Wiedemann (1993). "My Name Was Martha": A Renaissance Woman's Autobiographical Poem. West-Cornwall: Locust Hill Press. (monograph).
