= Foy–ODK Sportsmanship Trophy =

James E. Foy, V–ODK Sportsmanship Trophy
- Awarded for: Winning the Iron Bowl
- Location: Tuscaloosa or Auburn, AL
- Country: United States
- First award: 1948
- Currently held by: The University of Alabama

The James E. Foy, V–Omicron Delta Kappa Sportsmanship Trophy, more commonly known as the Foy–ODK Sportsmanship Trophy, is awarded annually to the winner of the Iron Bowl football rivalry game between the University of Alabama and Auburn University. The trophy's namesakes are Dean James E. Foy, V, who served at both Auburn and Alabama and the father of photojournalist Mary Lou Foy, and Omicron Delta Kappa (ODK) National Leadership Honor Society, which has circles at both universities. In years of Auburn victories, the trophy is displayed at the Auburn Arena in the Jonathan B. Lovelace Hall of Honor, and following Alabama victories, the trophy resides in the Paul W. Bryant Museum.

The Omicron Delta Kappa Trophy was established in 1948 by the two circles of Omicron Delta Kappa to signify a good relationship between the two schools despite the bitter rivalry. In 1978, upon his retirement from Auburn University, the trophy was dedicated to Dean James Edgar Foy, V due to his importance to both schools. Foy graduated from the University of Alabama and served there as the assistant dean of students before serving as dean of students at Auburn University. Foy also served as the faculty secretary, the key faculty officer for ODK, for both circles.

Each year, the trophy is presented to the winning school by the losing school at the winners' home basketball game in the Iron Bowl of Basketball, and then resides at the winning university through the following year. The ODK president from the losing school presents the trophy to the ODK president of the winning school during halftime of the basketball game, and tradition dictates that the presenter also sing the fight song of the winning school. This tradition is seen at University of Alabama SGA as President James Fowler sings the Auburn fight song in 2011. The circle from the losing school also treats the circle from winning school to dinner.
