= James McLemore =

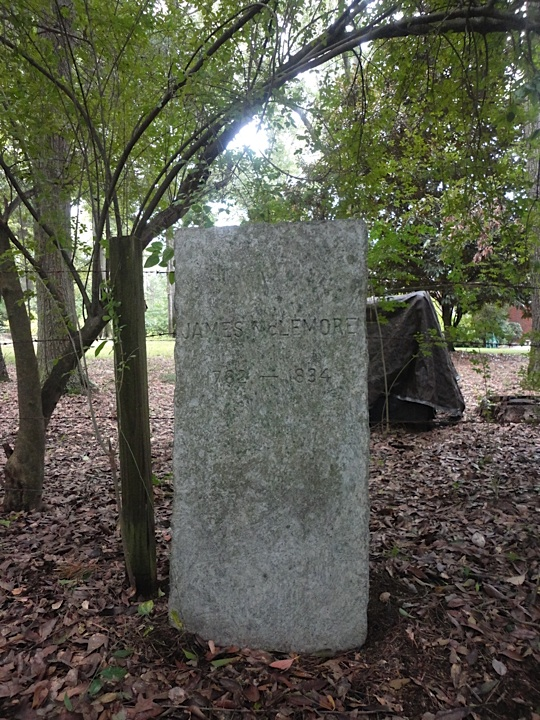
Gravestone of James McLemore, Montgomery, Alabama

James McLemore (1782–1834) was a white Baptist minister in Montgomery, Alabama. He was a leader of the Alabama Baptist Association and founder of a number of churches. He is known also for having an African American associate minister, the enslaved Caesar Blackwell. McLemore and his descendants acquired much land which developed into the 7000-acre McLemore Plantation, which was farmed first by enslaved people and later by sharecroppers and tenants.

== Biography ==
Born in Granville County, North Carolina, McLemore married in Hancock County, Georgia, and preached in the Elam Church in Jones County, Georgia, which became a member of the Ocmulgee Baptist Association in 1810. He moved to Montgomery by way of the Federal Road where he founded the Antioch Baptist Church (organized on June 5, 1818), one of four churches that went on to form the Alabama Baptist Association (ABA). At the time, slavery and, more specifically, the membership of enslaved people in Baptist churches, was becoming a serious matter of contention; the Ocmulgee Baptist Association had resolved, citing Ephesians 6:9 and Colossians 4:1, that enslaved people were to be treated "with humanity and justice", a decision which according to Gary Burton, pastor of Pintlala Baptist Church, Hope Hull, Alabama, was to have a great influence on McLemore's future with a black associate minister. McLemore, who built a reputation as a "famous white evangelist", founded three of the four churches that made up the ABA—in addition to Antioch, he founded the Elim (also known as Old Elam, June 19, 1819) and Bethel churches (February 13, 1819). He was described as a "holy man and zealous herald of the truth, although afflicted in body".

McLemore is known also as the preacher who enslaved the wife and child of Caesar Blackwell, an enslaved man who had been bought by the ABA and became McLemore's associate minister at the Antioch Church. After his death, the execution of his will was contested in the Alabama Supreme Court; specifically, how two of the people enslaved by McLemore were to be distributed among children "of the whole blood" and those "of the half blood" was challenged, with the court deciding that those "of the whole blood" were to be favored. The McLemore bible, more than a hundred years old, was read from at a ceremony celebrating the continued unity of the four original Baptist churches in 1923. The latter's family continues to be a prominent family in Montgomery: the campus of Auburn University at Montgomery is built on 500 acres of the former McLemore plantation.
