= Alabama–Auburn men's basketball rivalry =

American college basketball rivalry

- Alabama Crimson Tide Auburn Tigers
- Sport: Men's college basketball
- First meeting: March 1, 1924; Alabama 40, Auburn 19
- Latest meeting: March 7, 2026; Alabama 96, Auburn 84
- Next meeting: TBD

Statistics
- Total meetings: 174
- All-time series: Alabama leads, 105–69
- Largest victory: Auburn, 94–40 (January 18, 1998)
- Longest win streak: Alabama, 11 (1976–1981)
- Current win streak: Alabama, 3 (2025–present)

Locations of Alabama and Auburn

The Alabama–Auburn men's basketball rivalry is a men's college basketball rivalry between the Auburn Tigers and the Alabama Crimson Tide. Though both schools are best known for their football programs, the deeply rooted rivalry between the two extends to basketball as well.

== Foy-ODK Sportsmanship Award ==
The trophy given to the winner of the Alabama–Auburn football game is the Foy-ODK Sportsmanship Award. It is named after James E. Foy, an Alabama graduate and former Auburn dean of students and Omicron Delta Kappa Honor Society (ODK) – which was established on both campuses during the 1920s. The trophy is presented by the ODK president from the losing school to the winning school at midcourt during halftime of the Alabama–Auburn men's basketball game at the winning school's home arena.

== Notable games ==
March 1, 1924 - Alabama defeats Auburn at the Southern Conference Tournament in Atlanta 40–19 in their first ever meeting.

January 5, 1955 - In the first ever matchup in which either team was ranked, #16 Alabama defeats #20 Auburn 99–78.

February 27, 1960 - #13 Auburn clinches its first ever SEC championship with a dramatic 63–61 victory over Alabama by a last second lay up in overtime.

February 14, 1970 - Auburn's John Mengelt scores a school-record 60 points and hits 23-of-44 field goals in the Tigers' 121–78 blow-out over Alabama.

January 22, 1972 - After Auburn won 26 of 30 games in the series Alabama stopped the streak with 89–66 win.

March 8, 1975 - Auburn upsets #7 Alabama 76–70, snapping the Tide's 7 game win streak in the series.

January 3, 1977 - #3 Alabama survives on the road with a 74–71 victory over #20 Auburn.

January 5, 1983 - Led by Charles Barkley, Auburn upsets #5 Alabama 91–80.

March 9, 1985 - Auburn becomes the first team in SEC history to win four tournament games in four days as Auburn defeats Alabama in the SEC Tournament Championship Game 53–49 in overtime.

January 18, 1998 - Auburn hands Alabama their worst loss in school history with a 94–40 thrashing at Beard-Eaves-Memorial Coliseum.

February 21, 2001 - With 4.4 seconds left in overtime, Reggie Sharp weaves through traffic and banks in a 36-foot jumper to give Auburn a 72–69 upset of #15 Alabama.

January 18, 2003 - Auburn upsets #9 Alabama 77–68, extending Auburn's home court winning streak to 7, a school series record.

March 9, 2018 - After trailing by 10 points at halftime of the quarterfinals of the SEC Tournament, #9 seed Alabama outscored #1 seed Auburn 50–22 in the second half to win 81–63. It was the first time a 9 seed had defeated a 1 seed in the SEC Tournament.

March 5, 2019 - Auburn trailing by 13 with 18:35 left in the second half, Auburn would go on a 22–9 run to tie the game at 45. Alabama would then tie the game at 60 with 1:40 left, before Auburn would score the final 6 points, giving Auburn a win over Alabama and their second regular season sweep of Alabama in three seasons.

January 15, 2020 - Alabama handed #4 Auburn its first loss of the season 83–64. This was the first time Alabama had beaten a top 4 team since 2004.

January 11, 2022 - #24 Alabama would come back from down 13, tying the game with 4:06 left in the game, before #4 Auburn would score 6 of the final 8 points to win. This win would be their 12th in their 19 game win streak during that season.

February 11, 2023 - #3 Alabama would win for the second time in three years at Neville Arena as they beat Auburn 77–69. This game was featured as the College GameDay game of the week, a first for the rivalry and for Alabama basketball.

February 15, 2025 - #1 Auburn traveled to #2 Alabama in what was the first meeting between the top 2 Teams in the AP poll in SEC history, and only the sixth time in AP poll history when 2 teams from the same state met as the top 2 teams in the poll. The game was featured as the College GameDay game of the week. Auburn defeated Alabama 94–85 in a wire-to-wire victory where Auburn never trailed. Johni Broome led all scorers with 19 points along with 14 rebounds.

March 8, 2025 - #7 Alabama avenged their earlier loss in Tuscaloosa by defeating #1 Auburn 93–91 in overtime in Neville Arena. Mark Sears hit a 15-foot jumper at the buzzer for the win. This marked the first time in series history that the road team won both regular season matchups.

== Game results ==
Since 1924, the Crimson Tide and the Tigers have played 172 times. Alabama leads the all-time series, with 103 wins to Auburn's 69. The game has been played in 10 cities: Auburn, Tuscaloosa, Birmingham, Montgomery, Atlanta, Louisville, Memphis, Nashville, Orlando, and St. Louis. Alabama leads the series in Tuscaloosa (51–12), Atlanta (2–1), Louisville (2–0), Memphis (1–0), Nashville (1–0), Orlando (1–0), and St. Louis (1–0). Auburn leads the series in Auburn (35–29), Montgomery (17–9) and Birmingham (4–3). In games played at neutral sites, the Tigers lead (22–20); in games played during the SEC Tournament, the Crimson Tide lead (8–2); and in games played during the SEC Tournament Championship, the Tigers lead (1–0). In games in which only Auburn was ranked, the Tigers have a 13–4 record; in games in which only Alabama was ranked, the Tide have a 29–9 record. In games in which both teams were ranked, Alabama leads the series 4–3. A total of 14 games have gone past regulation, with the Tigers leading at 8–6.

Alabama victories	Auburn victories	Tie games

No.	Date	Location	Winner	Score
1	March 1, 1924	Atlanta, GA	Alabama	40–19
2	February 28, 1941	Louisville, KY	Alabama	38–16
3	December 21, 1948	Birmingham, AL	Alabama	46–45
4	January 5, 1949	Auburn, AL	Alabama	45–38
5	January 27, 1949	Tuscaloosa, AL	Alabama	39–37
6	December 20, 1949	Auburn, AL	Auburn	45–40
7	January 28, 1950	Tuscaloosa, AL	Auburn	66–58
8	February 18, 1950	Auburn, AL	Auburn	67–58
9	December 19, 1950	Tuscaloosa, AL	Alabama	70–46
10	January 18, 1951	Auburn, AL	Alabama	65–64
11	February 10, 1951	Tuscaloosa, AL	Alabama	63–44
12	February 2, 1952	Auburn, AL	Alabama	62–60
13	February 23, 1952	Tuscaloosa, AL	Alabama	63–50
14	February 28, 1952	Louisville, KY	Alabama	63–49
15	January 17, 1953	Tuscaloosa, AL	Alabama	61–51
16	February 28, 1953	Auburn, AL	Auburn	78–73
17	December 19, 1953	Birmingham, AL	Alabama	70–62
18	January 16, 1954	Tuscaloosa, AL	Alabama	70–58
19	March 5, 1954	Auburn, AL	Alabama	57–55
20	January 15, 1955	Montgomery, AL	#16 Alabama	99–78
21	March 5, 1955	Montgomery, AL	#11 Alabama	84–80
22	January 14, 1956	Montgomery, AL	#19 Alabama	86–77
23	March 2, 1956	Montgomery, AL	#3 Alabama	93–82
24	January 19, 1957	Montgomery, AL	Auburn	92–88^{OT}
25	March 1, 1957	Montgomery, AL	Alabama	81–79^{2OT}
26	January 18, 1958	Montgomery, AL	Alabama	83–65
27	March 1, 1958	Montgomery, AL	#16 Auburn	67–65
28	December 20, 1958	Birmingham, AL	#13 Auburn	79–60
29	January 17, 1959	Montgomery, AL	#5 Auburn	57–55
30	February 28, 1959	Montgomery, AL	#6 Auburn	69–50
31	December 19, 1959	Birmingham, AL	Auburn	59–52
32	January 16, 1960	Montgomery, AL	Auburn	69–66
33	February 27, 1960	Montgomery, AL	#13 Auburn	63–61^{OT}
34	December 17, 1960	Birmingham, AL	#11 Auburn	74–62
35	January 28, 1961	Montgomery, AL	Alabama	71–66^{OT}
36	March 4, 1961	Montgomery, AL	Auburn	80–69
37	January 20, 1962	Montgomery, AL	Auburn	60–50
38	March 4, 1962	Montgomery, AL	Auburn	62–49
39	January 19, 1963	Montgomery, AL	Auburn	81–78^{OT}
40	March 2, 1963	Montgomery, AL	Auburn	74–67^{OT}
41	January 18, 1964	Montgomery, AL	Alabama	86–72
42	February 29, 1964	Montgomery, AL	Auburn	83–76
43	January 16, 1965	Montgomery, AL	Auburn	93–68
44	March 6, 1965	Montgomery, AL	Auburn	80–60
45	January 22, 1966	Montgomery, AL	Auburn	90–71
46	March 5, 1966	Montgomery, AL	Alabama	88–83
47	February 11, 1967	Montgomery, AL	Auburn	66–63
48	March 3, 1967	Montgomery, AL	Auburn	99–96^{OT}
49	February 10, 1968	Tuscaloosa, AL	Alabama	64–63
50	March 2, 1968	Auburn, AL	Auburn	73–69
51	January 15, 1969	Auburn, AL	Auburn	78–63
52	February 17, 1969	Tuscaloosa, AL	Auburn	60–53
53	January 12, 1970	Tuscaloosa, AL	Auburn	86–77
54	February 14, 1970	Auburn, AL	Auburn	121–78
55	January 11, 1971	Auburn, AL	Auburn	83–72
56	February 13, 1971	Tuscaloosa, AL	Auburn	92–76
57	January 22, 1972	Tuscaloosa, AL	Alabama	89–66
58	February 19, 1972	Auburn, AL	Alabama	79–78
59	January 20, 1973	Auburn, AL	#11 Alabama	76–64
60	February 17, 1973	Tuscaloosa, AL	#17 Alabama	87–75
61	February 2, 1974	Auburn, AL	#8 Alabama	73–64
62	March 4, 1974	Tuscaloosa, AL	#7 Alabama	97–84
63	February 1, 1975	Tuscaloosa, AL	#9 Alabama	77–53
64	March 8, 1975	Auburn, AL	Auburn	76–70
65	January 10, 1976	Auburn, AL	#10 Alabama	63–62
66	February 7, 1976	Tuscaloosa, AL	#17 Alabama	86–75
67	January 3, 1977	Auburn, AL	#3 Alabama	74–71
68	March 5, 1977	Tuscaloosa, AL	#12 Alabama	81–77
69	January 24, 1978	Auburn, AL	Alabama	81–74
70	February 25, 1978	Tuscaloosa, AL	Alabama	89–86
71	January 20, 1979	Auburn, AL	#18 Alabama	83–76
72	February 17, 1979	Tuscaloosa, AL	#20 Alabama	80–73
73	January 23, 1980	Auburn, AL	Alabama	50–46^{OT}
74	February 20, 1980	Tuscaloosa, AL	Alabama	59–47
75	January 28, 1981	Tuscaloosa, AL	Alabama	83–73
76	February 25, 1981	Auburn, AL	Auburn	56–54
77	January 27, 1982	Auburn, AL	#13 Alabama	67–65
78	February 24, 1982	Tuscaloosa, AL	#17 Alabama	74–72
79	January 5, 1983	Auburn, AL	Auburn	91–80
80	March 6, 1983	Tuscaloosa, AL	Alabama	86–78
81	March 10, 1983	Birmingham, AL	Alabama	62–61
82	January 5, 1984	Tuscaloosa, AL	Auburn	91–86
83	March 3, 1984	Auburn, AL	Auburn	83–70
84	January 16, 1985	Auburn, AL	Alabama	60–55
85	February 16, 1985	Tuscaloosa, AL	Alabama	74–72^{2OT}
86	March 9, 1985	Birmingham, AL	Auburn	53–49^{OT}
87	January 16, 1986	Tuscaloosa, AL	#18 Alabama	60–56
88	February 15, 1986	Auburn, AL	Auburn	71–69

No.	Date	Location	Winner	Score
89	January 22, 1987	Tuscaloosa, AL	#13 Alabama	88–82
90	February 21, 1987	Auburn, AL	#12 Alabama	77–75
91	March 7, 1987	Atlanta, GA	#9 Alabama	87–68
92	January 27, 1988	Auburn, AL	Auburn	84–74
93	February 27, 1988	Tuscaloosa, AL	Alabama	82–77
94	January 28, 1989	Auburn, AL	Alabama	67–64
95	March 2, 1989	Tuscaloosa, AL	Alabama	74–58
96	January 27, 1990	Tuscaloosa, AL	#24 Alabama	78–59
97	February 28, 1990	Auburn, AL	Alabama	80–65
98	March 10, 1990	Orlando, FL	Alabama	87–71
99	January 3, 1991	Auburn, AL	Alabama	68–56
100	February 2, 1991	Tuscaloosa, AL	Alabama	88–80
101	March 9, 1991	Nashville, TN	#24 Alabama	77–59
102	January 18, 1992	Auburn, AL	Auburn	81–63
103	March 7, 1992	Tuscaloosa, AL	#20 Alabama	82–80
104	January 27, 1993	Tuscaloosa, AL	Alabama	81–78
105	March 3, 1993	Auburn, AL	Auburn	78–70
106	January 25, 1994	Auburn, AL	Alabama	74–69
107	March 5, 1994	Tuscaloosa, AL	Alabama	83–68
108	March 11, 1994	Memphis, TN	Alabama	83–55
109	February 1, 1995	Tuscaloosa, AL	#20 Alabama	65–63
110	February 18, 1995	Auburn, AL	#18 Alabama	86–73
111	January 10, 1996	Tuscaloosa, AL	Alabama	72–65
112	February 14, 1996	Auburn, AL	Alabama	75–72
113	January 28, 1997	Auburn, AL	Auburn	72–62
114	February 22, 1997	Tuscaloosa, AL	Alabama	55–50
115	January 18, 1998	Auburn, AL	Auburn	94–40
116	February 4, 1998	Tuscaloosa, AL	Alabama	76–62
117	January 23, 1999	Tuscaloosa, AL	#6 Auburn	73–58
118	February 13, 1999	Auburn, AL	#3 Auburn	102–61
119	March 5, 1999	Atlanta, GA	#4 Auburn	93–61
120	February 2, 2000	Auburn, AL	#10 Auburn	77–63
121	February 22, 2000	Tuscaloosa, AL	Alabama	68–64
122	January 27, 2001	Tuscaloosa, AL	#15 Alabama	81–80
123	February 21, 2001	Auburn, AL	Auburn	72–69^{OT}
124	January 12, 2002	Auburn, AL	Auburn	59–56
125	February 27, 2002	Tuscaloosa, AL	#6 Alabama	73–68
126	January 18, 2003	Auburn, AL	Auburn	77–68
127	February 15, 2003	Tuscaloosa, AL	Alabama	84–68
128	January 17, 2004	Tuscaloosa, AL	Alabama	69–46
129	February 24, 2004	Auburn, AL	Alabama	72–71
130	January 26, 2005	Auburn, AL	#14 Alabama	60–55
131	March 2, 2005	Tuscaloosa, AL	#19 Alabama	94–53
132	January 11, 2006	Auburn, AL	Alabama	56–52
133	March 1, 2006	Tuscaloosa, AL	Alabama	71–61
134	January 23, 2007	Auburn, AL	Auburn	81–57
135	February 24, 2007	Tuscaloosa, AL	Auburn	86–77
136	January 26, 2008	Tuscaloosa, AL	Alabama	97–77
137	February 4, 2008	Auburn, AL	Auburn	88–76
138	January 17, 2009	Auburn, AL	Auburn	85–71
139	March 3, 2009	Tuscaloosa, AL	Auburn	77–73
140	January 30, 2010	Auburn, AL	Auburn	58–57
141	March 6, 2010	Tuscaloosa, AL	Alabama	73–61
142	January 22, 2011	Auburn, AL	Alabama	68–58
143	February 23, 2011	Tuscaloosa, AL	Alabama	51–49
144	February 7, 2012	Auburn, AL	Alabama	68–50
145	February 29, 2012	Tuscaloosa, AL	Alabama	55–49
146	February 6, 2013	Auburn, AL	Auburn	49–37
147	February 26, 2013	Tuscaloosa, AL	Alabama	61–43
148	January 30, 2014	Auburn, AL	Auburn	74–55
149	March 1, 2014	Tuscaloosa, AL	Alabama	73–57
150	January 24, 2015	Tuscaloosa, AL	Alabama	57–55
151	February 17, 2015	Auburn, AL	Alabama	79–68
152	January 19, 2016	Auburn, AL	Auburn	83–77
153	February 27, 2016	Tuscaloosa, AL	Alabama	65–57
154	January 21, 2017	Auburn, AL	Auburn	84–64
155	February 4, 2017	Tuscaloosa, AL	Auburn	82–77
156	January 17, 2018	Tuscaloosa, AL	Alabama	76–71
157	February 21, 2018	Auburn, AL	#12 Auburn	90–71
158	March 9, 2018	St. Louis, MO	Alabama	81–63
159	February 2, 2019	Auburn, AL	Auburn	84–63
160	March 5, 2019	Tuscaloosa, AL	Auburn	66–60
161	January 15, 2020	Tuscaloosa, AL	Alabama	83–64
162	February 12, 2020	Auburn, AL	#11 Auburn	95–91^{OT}
163	January 9, 2021	Auburn, AL	Alabama	94–90
164	March 2, 2021	Tuscaloosa, AL	#8 Alabama	70–58
165	January 11, 2022	Tuscaloosa, AL	#4 Auburn	81–77
166	February 1, 2022	Auburn, AL	#1 Auburn	100–81
167	February 11, 2023	Auburn, AL	#3 Alabama	77–69
168	March 1, 2023	Tuscaloosa, AL	#2 Alabama	90–85^{OT}
169	January 24, 2024	Tuscaloosa, AL	Alabama	79–75
170	February 7, 2024	Auburn, AL	#12 Auburn	99–81
171	February 15, 2025	Tuscaloosa, AL	#1 Auburn	94–85
172	March 8, 2025	Auburn, AL	#7 Alabama	93–91^{OT}
173	February 7, 2026	Auburn, AL	Alabama	96–92
174	March 7, 2026	Tuscaloosa, AL	#16 Alabama	96–84
Series: Alabama leads 105–69

All scores, dates, and rankings come from the Auburn University athletic website.
