= Jack Rabin =

Jack M. Rabin (January 3, 1945 – November 13, 2006) was an American public administration scholar.

== Biography ==
=== Early life and education ===
Rabin received a B.A. in government (1965) and a M.A. in government (1967) from the University of Miami and a Ph.D. in political science from the University of Georgia (1972). His dissertation (written under the direction of Robert T. Golembiewski) used Lawrence Kolhberg's moral development protocol to operationalize Chester Barnard's "zone of indifference" in organizations.

=== Career ===
Rabin held faculty positions at Auburn University Montgomery (1972–1980), Rider University (1983–1987), and The Pennsylvania State University-Harrisburg (1988–2006). His academic specialities included public budgeting, public personnel administration, and public administration.

Rabin was the founding editor of eight academic journals, including Public Administration Quarterly, the International Journal of Public Administration, the Journal of Public Budgeting, Accounting and Financial Management, the Journal of Health and Human Services Administration. Rabin was the series executive editor of the largest book series in public administration. It included 120 books edited by scholars from around the world, and was published by Marcel Dekker, Inc. Almost every major scholar in public administration during the period from 1973 to 2006 was published one or more times in a publication created by Jack Rabin.

While living in Alabama, Jack Rabin became interested in developing an oral history of the civil rights movement. He, with help from graduate students, befriended the organizers of the Montgomery Improvement Association, the organization responsible for the Montgomery bus boycott. He and his assistants conducted extensive interviews with E.D. Nixon; Clifford and Virginia Durr; Johnnie Carr and many other friends and associates of Martin Luther King, Jr. involved in the Montgomery bus boycott. Moreover, he befriended the officers of the Alabama Department of Public Safety that conducted surveillance of activities including the Selma to Montgomery March. These relationships allowed him to accumulate a unique collection of photos, interviews and other documents that he eventually donated to Penn State University. PSU organized the material as The Jack Rabin Collection on Alabama Civil Rights and Southern Activists.

=== Marriage and children ===
Rabin and his wife Sandra had two sons, Daniel and Scott.

=== Death and afterward ===
Rabin died on November 13, 2006, in Harrisburg, Pennsylvania and he was interred in Beth Shalom Cemetery in Mechanicsburg, Pennsylvania. A series of remembrances were published in the Public Administration Section Newsletter of the public administration section of the American Political Science Association and in the "Journal of Public Administration Education" published by the National Association of Schools of Public Affairs and Administration.
