= J. C. Powell =

American academic (1926–1988)

J.C. Powell

8th President of Eastern Kentucky University
- In office March 1975 (Note: Acting: March 1975–August 1976) – December 1984
- Preceded by: Robert R. Martin
- Succeeded by: Hanly Funderburk

Personal details
- Born: January 23, 1926 Harriman, Tennessee
- Died: May 16, 1988 (aged 62) Richmond, Kentucky
- Resting place: Richmond Cemetery, Richmond, Kentucky
- Spouse: Elizabeth C. Downey Powell
- Education: University of Kentucky University of Louisville

Military service
- Army Air Corps (1944–1947): Served in Guam, Saipan, and Mariana Islands campaigns of the Pacific Theater during World War II

Julius Cherry Powell (January 23, 1926 – May 16, 1988) was an American academic teacher and the seventh president of Eastern Kentucky University.

== Early life and education ==
J.C. Powell was born on January 23, 1926, in Harriman, Tennessee, his mother's childhood home. He moved to Kentucky with his family and grew up in Harrodsburg, Kentucky. His father, Julius K. Powell, was the superintendent of public schools in Harrodsburg, Kentucky. Julius C. Powell graduated from Harrodsburg High School in 1944. After high school, Powell served two years in the military. Powell was an aircraft maintenance inspector in the Army Air Corps. He was in Guam, Saipan, and Marianas Island campaigns of the Pacific Theater during World War II. Powell served from 1944 to 1947. He continued his education at the University of Kentucky, where he graduated in 1950. He went to the University of Louisville to receive his Master's of Education in 1952. In 1970, he received his Doctor of Education degree from the University of Kentucky.

== Secondary education work ==
Powell served as a high school mathematics teacher at Atherton High School in Louisville, Kentucky, from 1950 until 1953. From 1953 to 1957 he held a variety of positions including Assistant Director of Curriculum, Director of Instructional Services, and Assistant to Superintendent of the Louisville Public Schools.

== University work ==
From 1957 to 1960 he was a divisional director for the Kentucky Department of Education. Powell joined the staff at Eastern Kentucky University in 1960, as the Executive assistant to University President, Dr. Robert R. Martin. Powell also served as Dean of Business Affairs in 1962 and Executive Dean in 1965–1969. He became the Vice President for Administration in 1969 and served as the secretary to the Board of Regents. He worked with Dr. Martin as the Vice President for Administration until Dr. Martin's retirement. He became President at Eastern Kentucky University in August 1976 to December 1984. Powell described the university under Martin as a teen figuring out who they are. During Martin's leadership building and infrastructure development was what made up EKU. When Powell came into leadership he described it as maturing. He capitalized on the strategic planning and budgeting at the university.

Powell served as president until 1984 and was succeeded by Dr. Hanly Funderburk.

== Personal life ==
Powell said he "strived to be the most private citizen" (Bucher, Maryleigh) one has ever seen. He enjoyed fishing and reading books. He made frequent trips to Laurel County to his cabin for leisure on the weekends. Powell planned on not going into education while he was in high school and during his time in the military. Engineering studies opened his eyes to his joy for working with people. Once he received his degrees he was offered to teach at Atherton high school.

== Death ==
Powell died of abdominal cancer on May 16, 1988, in Pattie A. Clay Hospital. He was 62 years old.

J.C. Powell, at the time of his death, was survived by his wife, Elizabeth C. Downey Powell (1917–1989). He also had two daughters, Karen P. Knezevich and Julie Powell. One grandchild, Kyle Jay Knezevich. His parents were J.K. and Lucille C. Powell.

== Legacy ==
Powell is responsible for the systematic approach to administrative and academic computing. He developed the first written mission statement that reflected institutional goals.

The EKU annual spring faculty retirement dinner of 1998 hosted the unveiling of an oil portrait of Powell. It was gifted by EKU's Alumni Association to the university. It is on permanent display in Keen Johnson with the portraits of Powell's six predecessors.

The current student center at Eastern Kentucky University is named after Powell. Built in 1971 the 110,601-square-foot (10,275.2 m^{2}) $5.4 million J.C. Powell Building (Eastern's Student Center) houses meeting and conference rooms, a food court, the campus cafeteria, student lounges, a bowling alley, and an arcade. (The bowling alley and arcade are now closed) The Powell Student Center underwent an extensive renovation and reopened in 2019. It houses the Student Government Association offices, along with the offices of other student affairs-related organizations.
