= Harry M. Philpott =

President of Auburn University
- In office 1965–1980
- Preceded by: Ralph Brown Draughon
- Succeeded by: Hanley Funderburk

Personal details
- Born: May 7, 1917 Bassett, Virginia
- Died: January 28, 2008 (aged 90) Auburn, Alabama

Harry Melvin Philpott (May 6, 1917 – January 28, 2008) was the President of Auburn University from 1965 to 1980.

== Biography ==
Harry M. Philpott graduated from Washington and Lee University in 1938. He served as a chaplain in the United States Navy during World War II. In 1947, Philpott received a PhD from Yale University in religion and higher education. From 1947 to 1952, he taught at the University of Florida, and from 1952 to 1957 he served as Dean of religious life at Stephens College. In addition, Harry M. Philpott was also the vice-president of the University of Florida from 1957 to 1965, but is most known for serving as the President of Auburn University from 1965 until 1980.

Academic offices
Preceded by Ralph Brown Draughon	President of Auburn University; 1965–1980	Succeeded by Hanley Funderburk
