= Auburn University at Montgomery =

Public university in Montgomery, Alabama, U.S.

- Motto: "Wisdom, Excellence, Service"
- Type: Public university
- Established: September 8, 1967; 58 years ago
- Parent institution: Auburn University
- Accreditation: SACS
- Endowment: $24 million
- Chancellor: Carl A. Stockton
- Academic staff: 318 (2006-2007)
- Students: 5,211 (Fall 2018)
- Undergraduates: 4,091 (Fall 2021)
- Postgraduates: 982 (Fall 2021)
- Location: Montgomery, Alabama, United States; 32°22′11″N 86°10′37″W
- Campus: Midsize City, 500 acres (2.0 km^{2})
- Colors: Black and Orange
- Nickname: Warhawks
- Sporting affiliations: NCAA Division II - Gulf South
- Mascot: Curtiss
- Website: aum.edu
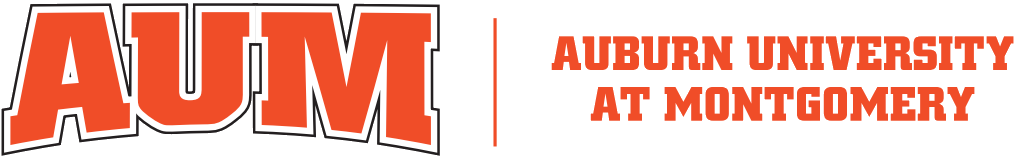

Auburn University at Montgomery (AUM) is a public university in Montgomery, Alabama, United States. Governed by the Auburn University Board of Trustees as a member of the Auburn University system, it was established by an act of the Alabama Legislature in 1967. AUM offers more than 90 programs of study leading to bachelor's, master's, specialist, and doctoral degrees. As of 2018, the university enrolled more than 5,200 students.

== History ==
AUM was established in 1967 by Act 403 of the Alabama Legislature. The 500 acres of land on which it is built were acquired by the McLemore family, descendants of James McLemore, which owned 7000 acres of land farmed first by enslaved people, then by sharecroppers and tenant farmers. In March 1968, Dr. H. Hanly Funderburk, Jr., was appointed vice president and chief administrator of the newly created university. AUM opened its doors in September 1969 with nearly 600 students in the old Alabama Extension Center on Bell Street, next to Maxwell AFB. Two years later, the university relocated to a 500-acre (2.0 km^{2}) campus on the McLemore Plantation tract, 7 miles (11 km) east of downtown Montgomery. The campus' first two buildings were the Administration/Library building and Goodwyn Hall with classrooms and faculty offices.

AUM has been accredited by the Southern Association of Colleges and Schools Commission on Colleges (SACSCOC) as an operationally separate institution from Auburn University since 1978.

== Academics ==
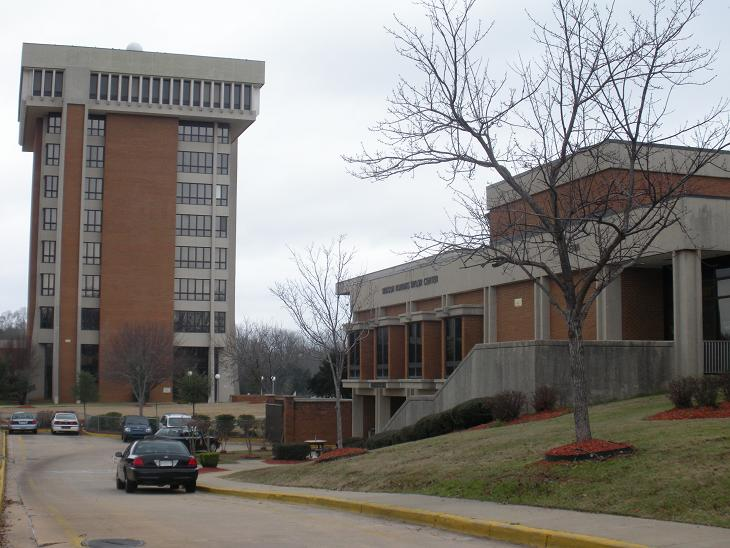
Ida Belle Young Library Tower (left) and Taylor Center (right)

Auburn University at Montgomery earned recognition from U.S. News & World Report and Princeton Review for the quality of its academic programs in 2018. U.S. News ranked AUM 22nd among regional universities] in the South for the quality of its undergraduate teaching and 38th among public comprehensive universities in the South.

For the 2018–19 academic year, AUM enrolled 4,632 undergraduate and 579 graduate students. The student body is 65 percent female and 34 percent male. Forty-five percent of students are white, 40 percent are black, 2 percent are Asian, 1 percent are Hispanic, and 5 percent are international students. AUM comprises five Colleges (Business, Education, Nursing and Health Sciences, Liberal Arts and Social Sciences, and Sciences) that offer bachelor, master and specialist degree programs. The most popular bachelor's degrees granted are business administration, nursing, liberal arts, biology, elementary education and secondary education. The university's nursing and medical laboratory sciences programs boast placement rates of more than 90 percent. AUM offers a joint doctorate program with Auburn University in Public Administration, and now offers a Doctor of Nursing Practice degree.

AUM has a continuing education program that enrolls over 10,000 students annually. Continuing Education curricula include certificate programs, corporate education, community education, computer training, languages (including English as a Foreign or Second Language), online training, and youth programs.

AUM's College of Business ranks in the top 5% of business schools in the world, as accredited by The Association to Advance Collegiate Schools of Business International, and was rated a "Best Business School" by The Princeton Review.

== Lecture series ==
Annual lectures include the Durr Lectures (since 1992), named for Clifford and Virginia Durr, Montgomery lawyers and civil rights activists; and the Ingram Lectures (since 1989), named for Robert Ingram, noted political analyst and journalist.

== Student life ==
Undergraduate demographics as of Fall 2023
Race and ethnicity	Total
Black	42%
White	42%
International student	5%
Two or more races	5%
Asian	3%
Hispanic	2%
Unknown	1%
Economic diversity
Low-income (Note: The percentage of students who received an income-based federal Pell grant intended for low-income students.)	48%
Affluent (Note: The percentage of students who are a part of the American middle class at the bare minimum.)	52%

=== Housing ===
AUM offers apartment-style residence halls with floor plans including up to four bedrooms. Housing is divided into four communities: P40 Place, The Courtyards, The Commons, and Warhawk Hall. P40 Place, which opened in the Fall of 2016, is named after the P-40 Warhawk aircraft of the World War II era that served as the inspiration for AUM's Curtiss The Warhawk mascot. The Courtyards residence opened in fall 1979 and is made up of seven two-story buildings. In 2003 the eight-story complex known as The Commons, featuring private 4-bedroom suites, was opened, and in fall 2013, Warhawk Hall was opened. Approximately 10 percent to 15 percent of AUM students live on campus during the regular school year.

== Athletics ==
The Auburn–Montgomery (AUM) athletic teams are called the Warhawks. The university is a member of the Division II level of the National Collegiate Athletic Association (NCAA), primarily competing in the Gulf South Conference (GSC) as a provisional member since the 2017–18 academic year (which achieved D-II full member status in 2019–20). The Warhawks previously competed as an NCAA D-II Independent during the 2016–17 school year; and in the Southern States Athletic Conference (SSAC; formerly known as Georgia–Alabama–Carolina Conference (GACC) until after the 2003–04 school year) of the National Association of Intercollegiate Athletics (NAIA) from 1999–2000 to 2015–16.

AUM competes in 11 intercollegiate varsity sports: Men's sports include baseball, basketball, cross country, soccer and tennis; while women's sports include basketball, cross country, soccer, softball, tennis and volleyball.

=== History ===
AUM participated in the NAIA for approximately 30 years. However, AUM has routinely explored possible future participation in NCAA Division II. AUM was accepted into the membership process to NCAA Division II on July 12, 2013, but the decision was then reversed on July 26, 2013. AUM was expected to join the Peach Belt Conference in 2014–15, but this will apparently be set aside with the NCAA's refusal to admit the school. However, the school re-applied and was approved to begin the three-year Division II membership process on July 17, 2015, and will begin the transition beginning with the 2015–16 season, while joining the Gulf South Conference for all sports effective in the 2017–18 season.

=== Nickname ===
On August 18, 2011, AUM officially changed the name of its sports teams from the Senators to the Warhawks.

=== Accomplishments ===
While participating in the NAIA, AUM teams won 25 national championship, 14 by the women's tennis team (1992, 1999, 2000, 2001, 2004, 2005, 2006, 2007, 2008, 2009, 2011, 2012, 2013, 2015), nine by the men's tennis team (1987, 1995, 1996, 2002, 2004, 2006, 2007, 2008, 2010) and most-recently consecutive championships by the softball team (2014, 2015). In addition, 22 teams finished as national runners-up. Individually, a student-athlete was named to a NAIA All-America team 451 times and 135 times a student-athlete was selected a NAIA Scholar-Athlete for their work in the classroom. On 32 occasions, an AUM head coach was selected National Coach of the Year. AUM teams have won a combined 107 conference or district championships and made 107 NAIA National Tournament appearances.

== Notable people ==
- Tarana Burke, civil rights activist and "Me Too" movement founder (majored in political science at AUM)
- Larry Chapman, former Auburn University at Montgomery basketball coach
- Amir Eshel, Israeli general
- Hanley Funderburk, former chief administrator of Auburn University at Montgomery
- Orlando Graham, former professional basketball player
- Alan Gribben, Mark Twain scholar and retired AUM professor
- Perry O. Hooper, Jr., Republican member of the Alabama House of Representatives from Montgomery (1984–2003)
- John E. Hyten, U.S. Air Force general and head of U.S. Strategic Command
- James L. Jamerson, general, former Deputy Commander in Chief for United States European Command (MBA, 1972)
- Terry Lathan, Chairman of the Alabama Republican Party
- Q. V. Lowe, former baseball coach for AUM and former Chicago Cubs assistant coach
- Richard Marcinko, author and former U.S. Navy SEAL commander
- Jessica Meuse, musician
- Masego Ntshingane, former member of Botswana national soccer team
- Blake Percival, whistleblower
- Jack Rabin, public administration scholar
- Stephanie Reynolds, co-founder of HIP Haiti, a non-profit organization
- Michael Ritch, former Major League Soccer player for Columbus Crew
- William A. Roosma, U.S. Army major general, MA and MS, 1977
- Michael Simmons, Anglican clergyman and history professor
- Octavia Spencer, actress
- Khalid bin Sultan, Saudi royal family member and former defense official
- Brandon Taylor, novelist and author of Real Life
- Halla Tómasdóttir, President of Iceland since 2024
- Barbara Wiedemann, poet and retired English professor
