= Antioch Baptist Church (Montgomery, Alabama) =

Historic church and cemetery

Coordinates: 32.3549°N 86.1040°W

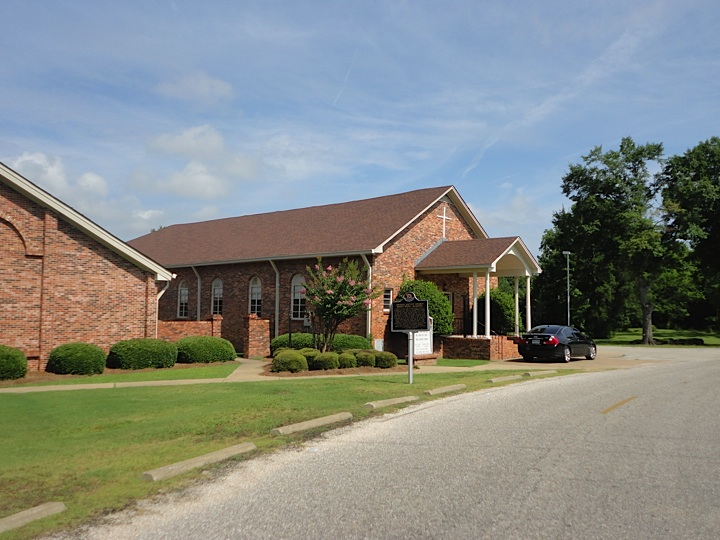
Antioch Baptist Church, 1919 building

The Antioch Baptist Church in Mount Meigs, Alabama (an unincorporated community in Montgomery County, Alabama) was founded in 1818 and is the first Baptist church in the county. Originally a rural white church, from 1849 until the Civil War it was a biracial church; since then, the church has moved and has become an African-American church. The old church site now has only a graveyard, the Antioch Cemetery.

== History ==
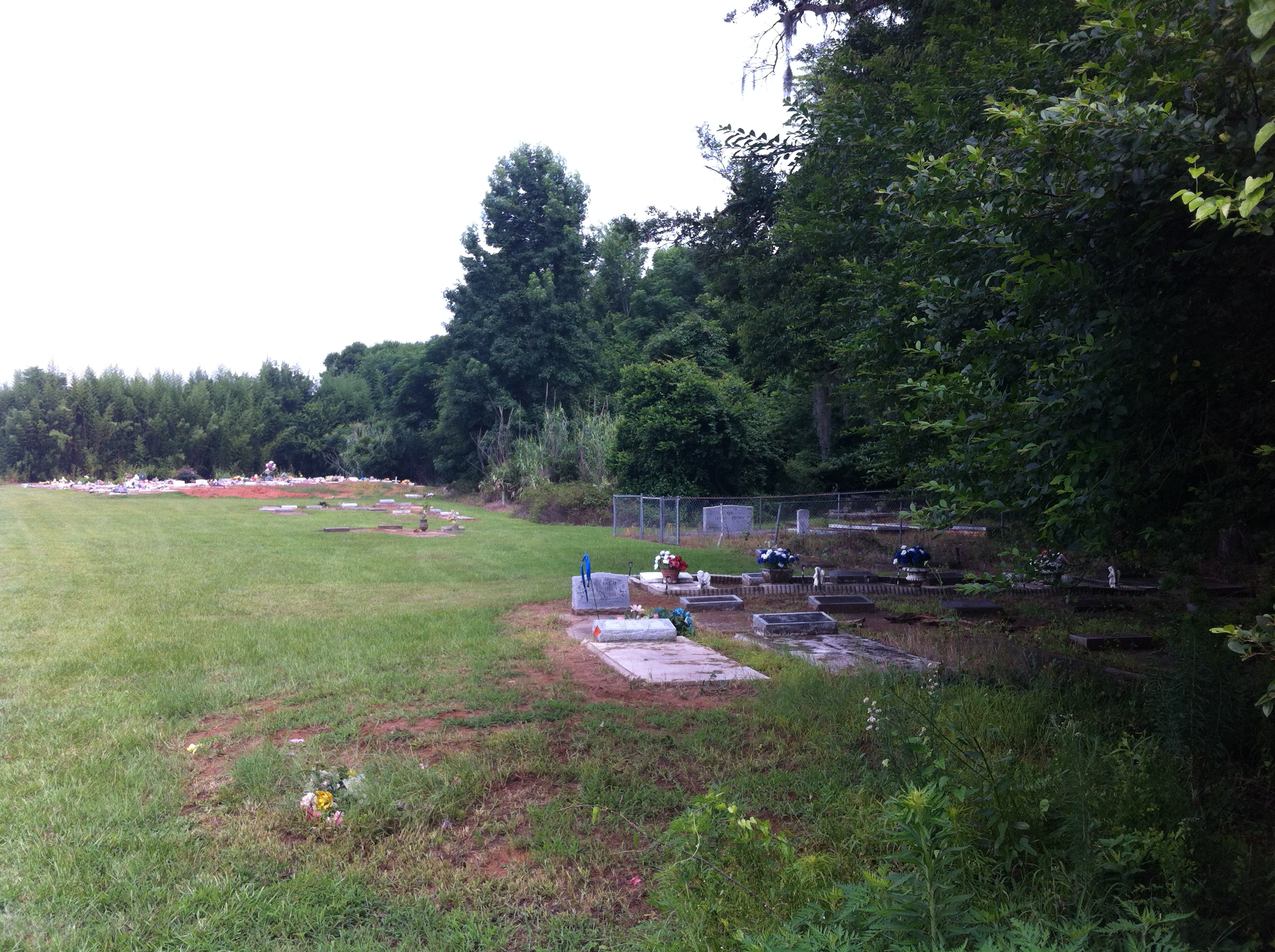
Overview of Antioch Cemetery

Antioch Baptist Church was founded by James McLemore, who also founded the Elam and Bethel Baptist churches in Montgomery county. Antioch's first church building was located on Atlanta Highway, east of Montgomery, on land donated by a Mr. Billy Wright. With the churches of Old Elam (also called Elim), Bethel, and Rehoboth, it formed a coalition which in 1819 founded the Alabama Baptist Association.

McLemore's associate preacher was an enslaved man named Caesar Blackwell, who had been bought by the ABA for $625 to preach to a mixed (black and white, slave and free) congregation. Blackwell's wife and child were owned by McLemore; apparently, Blackwell was a gifted preacher who could draw a mixed crowd and until 1835 was allowed to keep the income he generated from his preaching.

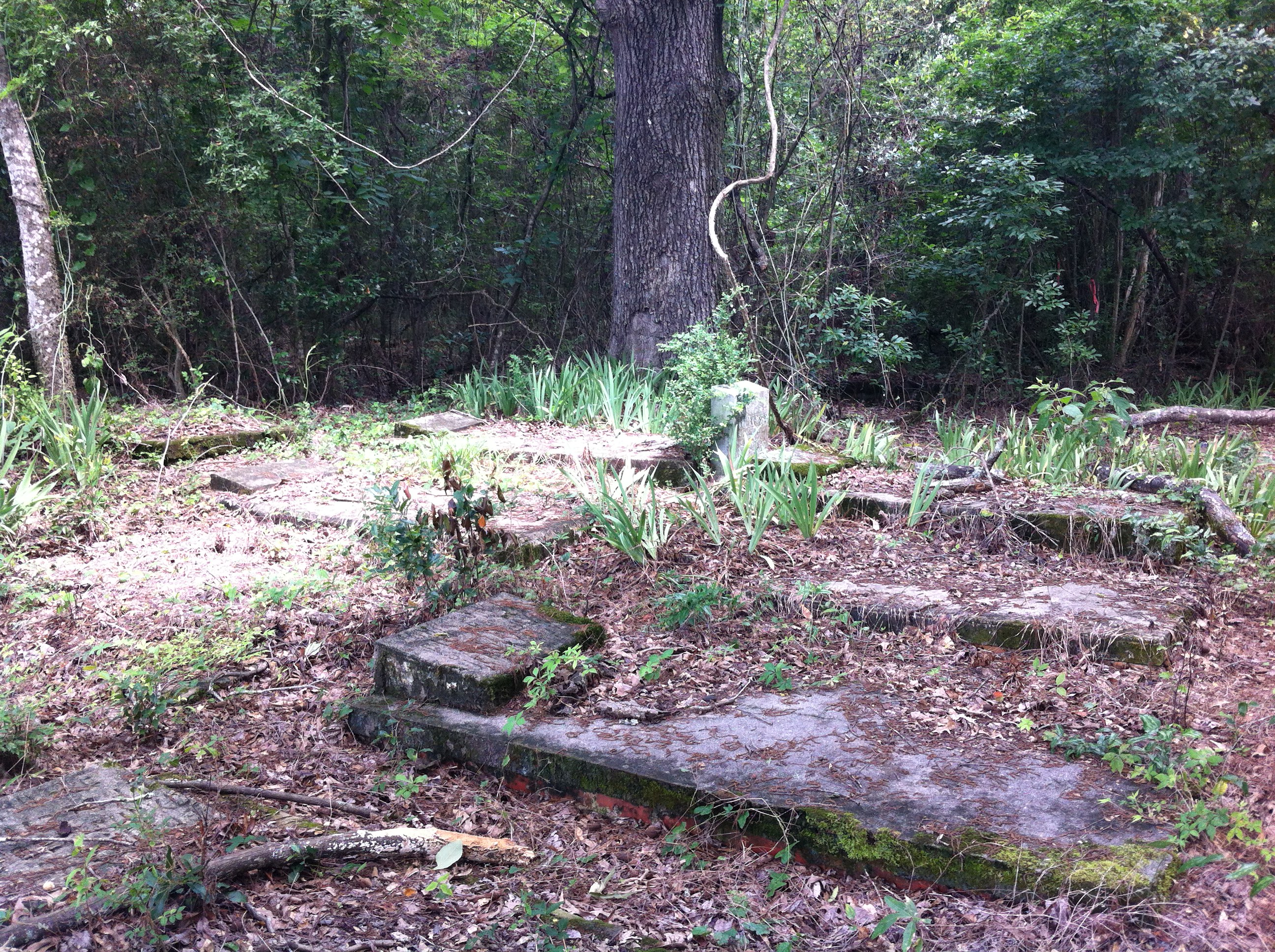
Graves in disrepair at Antioch Cemetery

Besides McLemore, Fielding Bradshaw was a pastor in its early days. By 1839 it had 132 members. Though the church was a white rural church, in 1849 it accepted around forty black members, through baptism, and the next year sixteen more. Around that time the white members left but kept the property, leaving a white pastor (A. T. M. Handy) in charge. Handy ordained seven colored deacons in 1854. Until the Civil War the church was biracial; after the war (and in contrast to what happened in many other congregations) the remaining white members left, leaving a black congregation; Antioch remains a black church. The first black pastor was ordained around 1882.

=== New church building ===
A new church was built in 1919, on the corner of Gibbs Road and Antioch Lane, still in Mount Meigs. The old church no longer stands, and the cemetery, though still in use, is suffering from neglect, with undocumented burials possibly taking place. Many graves are unmarked; others are overgrown or have fallen in. According to FindAGrave.com, there are some 380 graves, with 55 burials performed between 2010 and 2014.

The church was severely damaged by a storm in the 1930s, after which it was rebuilt and bricked. Another renovation was done in the 1980s, and in 1999 a new sanctuary was added, completing extensive renovations which also added classrooms and a nursery.

== See also ==
- First Baptist Church (Montgomery, Alabama)
- First Baptist Church (South Perry Street, Montgomery, Alabama)
