= Ralph Brown Draughon =

American educator and administrator (1899–1968)

President of Auburn University
- In office 1947–1965
- Preceded by: Luther Duncan
- Succeeded by: Harry M. Philpott

Personal details
- Born: September 1, 1899 Hartford, Alabama, U.S.
- Died: August 13, 1968 (aged 68)
- Education: Alabama Polytechnic Institute (BS, MS)
- Occupation: Educator; administrator

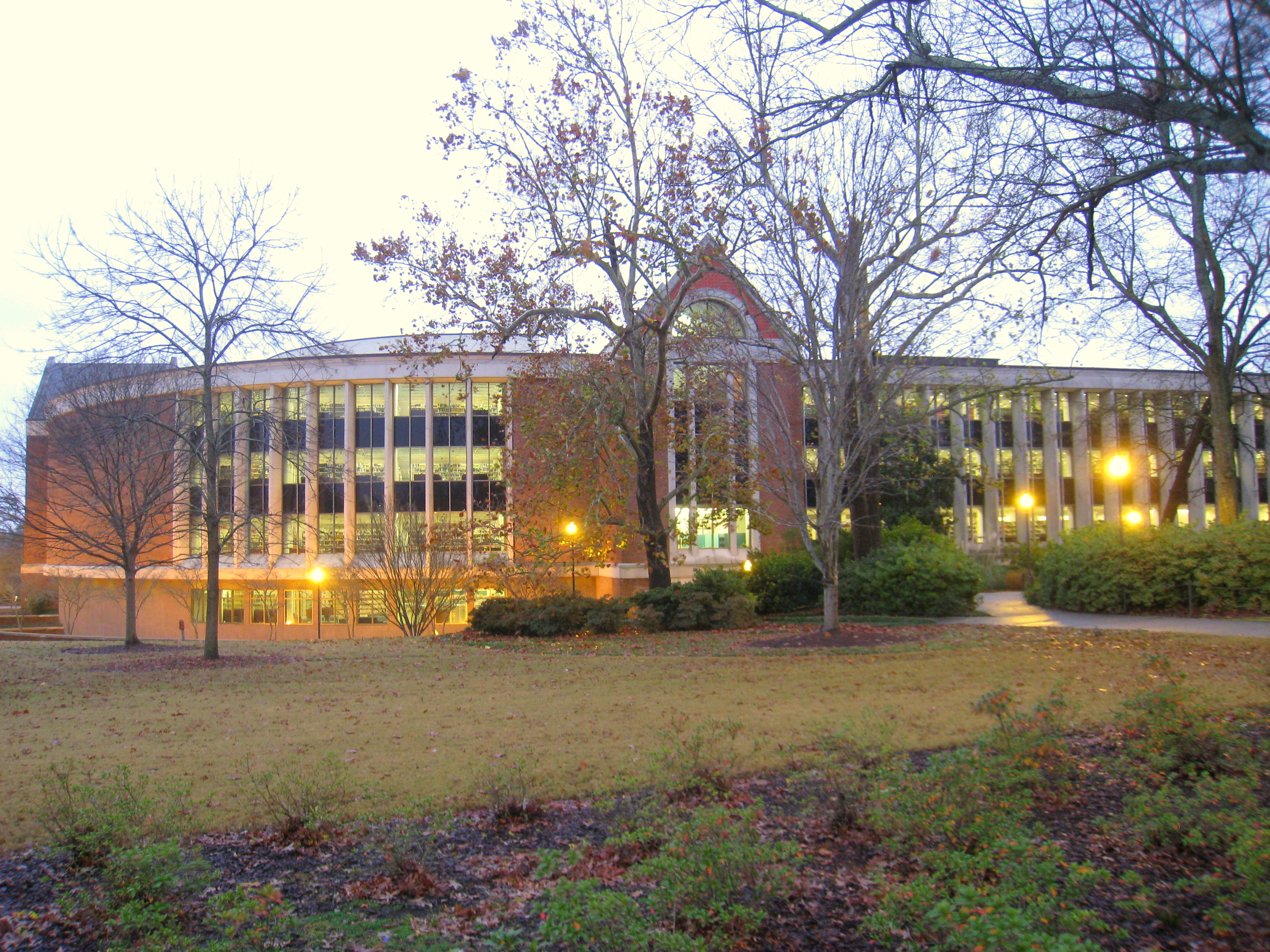
Ralph Brown Draughon Library, Auburn University, Auburn, Alabama, USA.

Ralph Brown Draughon (September 1, 1899 – August 13, 1968) was an American educator and administrator who served as the President of Auburn University from 1947 to 1965.

== Early life ==
Ralph Brown Draughon was born in Hartford, Alabama, in 1899. He graduated from Alabama Polytechnic Institute, now known as Auburn University, with a B.S. in 1922 and an M.S. in 1929. He was a member of the Phi Gamma Delta fraternity.

== Career ==
In 1931, he became an Assistant Professor of History and Political Science at Auburn. He was the President of Auburn University from 1947 to 1965.

== Death and legacy ==
He died on August 13, 1968.

A library at Auburn University was named after him in 1966.

Academic offices
Preceded by Luther Noble Duncan	President of Auburn University; 1947–1965	Succeeded by Harry M. Philpott
