= Caesar Blackwell =

African American preacher

Caesar Blackwell (1769–1845) was an enslaved African-American preacher in Alabama, one of several black preachers in the Southern United States who preached to a mixed congregation. He was either bought or freed by the Alabama Baptist Association, and preached in the Antioch Baptist Church in Montgomery County, Alabama.

== Biography ==
Received, Montgomery county, Alabama, of Francis Baker, James McLemore and William Bonnell, agents for the Alabama Baptist Association, $625.00 in full, for a negro man slave, named Caesar, formerly the property of John B. Blackwell, deceased. The property of said negro we forever warrant and defend against the claims of all and every person whatever. In witness whereof, we have hereunto set our hands and seals, this 15th day of December, 1828.

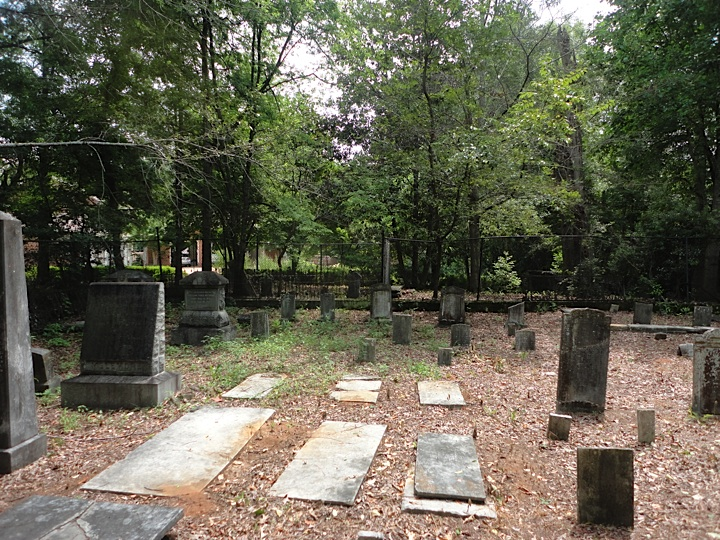
McLemore Taylor cemetery, site of the graves of Caesar Blackwell and James McLemore

Caesar Blackwell was enslaved by a John Blackwell. In 1821, "by experience and baptism", he joined the Antioch Baptist Church, which had been founded three years before by James McLemore, a preacher who had come from Georgia. He preached to an audience of both blacks and whites and, a modern historian notes, drew "standing-room-only crowds".

=== His freedom ===
Sources disagree on one important fact of Blackwell's life. Some sources claim his freedom was bought in 1825 by the Alabama Baptist Association, an association of Baptist churches founded in 1819; this account is given by Albert J. Raboteau, who cites B. F. Riley (History of the Baptists in the Southern States East of the Mississippi, Philadelphia, 1898, pp. 318–19): "After Blackwell's owner died, the Alabama Baptist Association bought and freed the slave to preach to his people". Others disagree: Wayne Flint, in his Alabama Baptists: Southern Baptists in the Heart of Dixie, says that the Antioch congregation tried to buy him his freedom in 1828 but was unsuccessful, and that in the end he was bought by the Alabama Baptist Association, and became a preaching assistant to one of its ministers, the aforementioned James McLemore, who already enslaved Blackwell's wife and child. Flynt's account is cited by others, including Gary Burton (pastor of Pintlala Baptist Church, Hope Hull, Alabama). James Benson Sellers, Slavery in Alabama (1994), offers another, slightly different account which states that Blackwell was enslaved by McLemore, and was either bought or freed by the ABA after McLemore's death:

Another extraordinary Baptist preacher was Caesar Blackwell, a fullblood African slave, a bright, smart, robust fellow. He began preaching at Elam and soon attracted so much attention that his master, the Reverend McLemore, often took him along on his tours. After McLemore died, the Baptist association made arrangements for Caesar's purchase. W. G. Robertson, in his Recollections of the Early Settlers of Montgomery County, written in 1892, says that he was bought for $1,000 (~$31,136 in 2024) and a guardian appointed for him. Another report, however, says that he was bought for $625 and set free.[56] Whatever the facts in the case were, Caesar was certainly listened to throughout his life with the utmost respect from whites and blacks alike. He was a frequent visitor in white homes. From a report of his trustees, we find that he preached and performed baptisms at Elam Church, Antioch, Rehoboth, Wetumpka, Mount Gilead, Cubihatchie, and Montgomery. When he became too feeble to preach, his trustees were recommended to furnish him with all the necessities of life.[57] He lived to a good old age, and when he died a stone was erected in his memory.

=== His calling ===
What most sources agree on is that Blackwell "was commissioned to preach and baptize converts in the slave community" and that his price was $625. He preached to both black and white people. According to Wilson Fallin and Wayne Flint, Blackwell had an excellent command of Calvinist theology and was praised by antebellum whites for "his attempt to elevate black Christianity by purging it of what whites saw as black superstition".

Blackwell, though enslaved still (according to Wayne Flint and Wilson Fallin), was allowed to keep the income he generated through preaching until the 1830s. In 1832, a shift in attitudes among the white population following slave insurrections in various Southern states led to severe restrictions on the educational opportunities and legal status of enslaved people. In 1835, the state Baptist convention in Alabama condemned Northern abolitionism. After 1835, he was allowed only to keep his expenses, and his preaching activities were curtailed; Gary Burton cites Nat Turner's Rebellion (1831) and the United States v. The Amistad case (1841) as events that caused limits to be placed on Blackwell's freedom of movement. His mentor and associate James McLemore died in 1835, and by 1844 Blackwell was in poor health, though he continued to baptize large numbers of converts, leading them "singing...through the streets of Montgomery on their way to the creek to be baptized". He died in 1845, and was buried close to James McLemore, with a slab honoring him; expenses were paid by the ABA.

Blackwell is buried at the McLemore Taylor cemetery in Montgomery (where McLemore is buried as well), in the "posh neighborhood" of Greystone—but just outside the enclosed area of the cemetery.
