= Michael Simmons (bishop) =

Michael Bland Simmons (died March 29 2024) was an archbishop of the Anglican Church of the Americas, a church in the Continuing Anglican movement, as well as an associate professor of history at Auburn University at Montgomery, Alabama.

Simmons was born in Raleigh, North Carolina, and earned a B.A. from the University of South Alabama (1976), studying Spanish Language and Literature and (Latin American) History and working as a student pastor. In 1980, he received his M.Div. at the Duke Divinity School, having studied Comparative Semitics, and in 1982 received his Master of Sacred Theology at Yale University. He then studied at New College, Edinburgh, and earned a Ph.D. in Early Church History (1985). His dissertation, Arnobius of Sicca. Conflict and Competition in the Age of Diocletian, was published in 1995 by Oxford University Press.

Simmons was consecrated bishop at St. Jude's Episcopal Church, Marietta, Georgia in 2000. He was elected archbishop in 2007 by the House of Bishops of the Anglican Province of Christ the Good Shepherd and was installed on March 26, 2008.
