= Hanly Funderburk =

Henry Hanly Funderburk Jr.

President of Auburn University
- In office 1980–1983
- Preceded by: Harry M. Philpott
- Succeeded by: Wilford S. Bailey

9th President of Eastern Kentucky University
- In office January 1, 1984 – July 1, 1998
- Preceded by: J. C. Powell
- Succeeded by: Robert W. Kustra

Personal details
- Born: June 19, 1931 Carrollton, Alabama
- Died: August 4, 2012 (aged 81) Wetumpka, Alabama
- Spouse: Helen Hanson Funderburk
- Children: Debra Alaine, Kenneth Cliff Funderburk
- Education: Auburn University (BA, MA); Louisiana State University (PhD)

Military service
- Allegiance: United States
- Branch/service: United States Army
- Years of service: 1953–1955
- Rank: 1st Lieutenant

Henry Hanly Funderburk Jr. (June 19, 1931 – August 4, 2012) was the 12th president of Auburn University from 1980 to 1983. He then became the 8th president of Eastern Kentucky University and served there from 1985 to 1998.

== Biography ==
=== Childhood and education ===
Funderburk was born in Carrollton, Alabama, on June 19, 1931. Hanly grew up working on his grandparents' farm in Carrollton, Alabama. He was married to the former Helen Handson of Carrollton, Alabama, and had two children, Debra Alaine (Mrs. James Dahl) and Kenneth Cliff. He graduated high school in Carrollton in 1949 and got his bachelor's and master's degrees at Auburn University for agricultural sciences and botany in 1953 and 1958, respectively. He also got his PhD in plant physiology at Louisiana State University in 1961. Funderburk was also in the U.S. Army, 1st Lt., Field Artillery, from 1953 to 1955.

=== Auburn University ===
After President Philpott resigned, the board appointed a search committee to find his successor. Funderburk reported that the board gave him two goals early in his administration: improving the university's financial situation and initiating a capital campaign. During his first year, Funderburk oversaw the completion of the stadium expansion and student housing projects. It was Funderburk’s management style to surround himself with close advisors from AUM while spending up to a third of his time away from campus with alumni or members of the legislature. Funderburk served as vice president, chancellor, and chief administrative officer of Auburn University from 1968 to 1980 and then became president. During his tenure, he made significant contributions to the academic, cultural, and social life of Montgomery and the state of Alabama. Funderburk's policies had antagonized many faculty and administrative staff members and brought into question the mission of the 127-year-old institution in the Alabama town that bears its name. The majority of the faculty was convinced that Funderburk intended to concentrate the school's resources on agriculture and engineering at the expense of the liberal arts and sciences. Funderburk maintained that he had no plans to cut back the liberal arts. Funderburk's aggressive approach was defended by some members of his supporters on the faculty.

=== President of Eastern Kentucky University ===
More than 1800 people were at Hanger Field to watch Funderburk be sworn in as the eighth president of Eastern Kentucky University by Kentucky’s Supreme Court chief justice, Robert F. Stephens. Funderburk said that his goal as president would be excellence for the school. He made several points about achieving his goal. Funderburk influenced the institution's historical development during a period of significant change in Kentucky higher education in regard to enrollment and financing. Funderburk placed great emphasis on conservative fiscal management and an increased role of external fundraising to meet these challenges. During Funderburk’s first year as president, he fulfilled his presidential duties in a superior manner and held true values of higher education in Kentucky. He had strongly advocated for full formula funding for higher education. He was also a president to the students through his innovative programs to personally involve himself in the student community. Two law enforcement facilities were built and named in honor of Funderburk and Robert C. McKinney. The Hanly Funderburk Building contains a forensic lab, breath test lab, computerized firearms training system, etc.

=== Death ===
Funderburk Jr. died on August 4, 2012, following an extended illness. He and his wife had been married for 59 years. Visitation was held on August 8, 2012, at 10 a.m. at Frazer Memorial United Methodist Church. It was followed by a memorial service at 11 a.m. with Rev. Tim Thompson and Dr. John Ed Mathison officiating. He served 14 years as president of Eastern Kentucky University in Richmond, KY. Dr. Funderburk also enjoyed golfing and traveling with his wife Helen and their many friends. He had been a member of Frazer Memorial United Methodist Church since 1969.

In 1980, Henry Hanly Funderburk became President of Auburn University after Governor Fob James recommended him. He was unpopular with the faculty, and resigned in 1983.

From 1984 to 1998 Funderburk served as president of Eastern Kentucky University.

In 1985, he became the President of the Southern Association of Colleges and Schools.

He died after a long illness in 2012.

== Bibliography ==
- Factors affecting the response of Zea Mays L. and Sorghum helepense L. to sodium 2,2-dichloropropionate (1958)

Academic offices
Preceded by Harry M. Philpott	President of Auburn University; 1980–1983	Succeeded by Wilford S. Bailey
