= Luther Duncan =

American educator and administrator (1875–1947)

President of Alabama Polytechnic Institute
- In office 1935–1947
- Preceded by: John Wilmore
- Succeeded by: Ralph Brown Draughon

Personal details
- Born: Luther Noble Duncan; October 14, 1875 Franklin County, Alabama, U.S.
- Died: July 26, 1947 (aged 71) Auburn, Alabama, U.S.
- Spouse: Annie Elizabeth Smith (m. 1902)
- Education: Alabama Polytechnic Institute (BS, MS)
- Occupation: Educator; administrator

Luther Noble Duncan (October 14, 1875 – July 26, 1947) was an American educator and administrator. He helped develop 4-H youth programs in Alabama, was director of the Alabama Extension Service (now Alabama Cooperative Extension System), and was president of the Alabama Polytechnic Institute (now Auburn University).

== Education and early career ==
While enrolled in his master's degree program at the Alabama Polytechnic Institute, Duncan was introduced to the work of Seaman A. Knapp, an early advocate of extension education.

Following graduation from the master's program, Duncan was appointed as a professor of Agricultural Extension at the Alabama Polytechnic Institute, where he was jointly employed by the college and the United States Department of Agriculture (USDA). During this period, Duncan began organizing boys' corn clubs across Alabama. In 1914, the clubs were merged with similar boys' corn clubs and girls' clubs across the nation and rebranded as "4-H clubs" under the Smith–Lever Act of 1914.

Throughout the 1910s and 1920s, Duncan also supported educational efforts related to the cultivation of cotton, peanuts, and tomatoes to diversify Alabama's agriculture. In addition, he encouraged efforts to promote hog and poultry production.

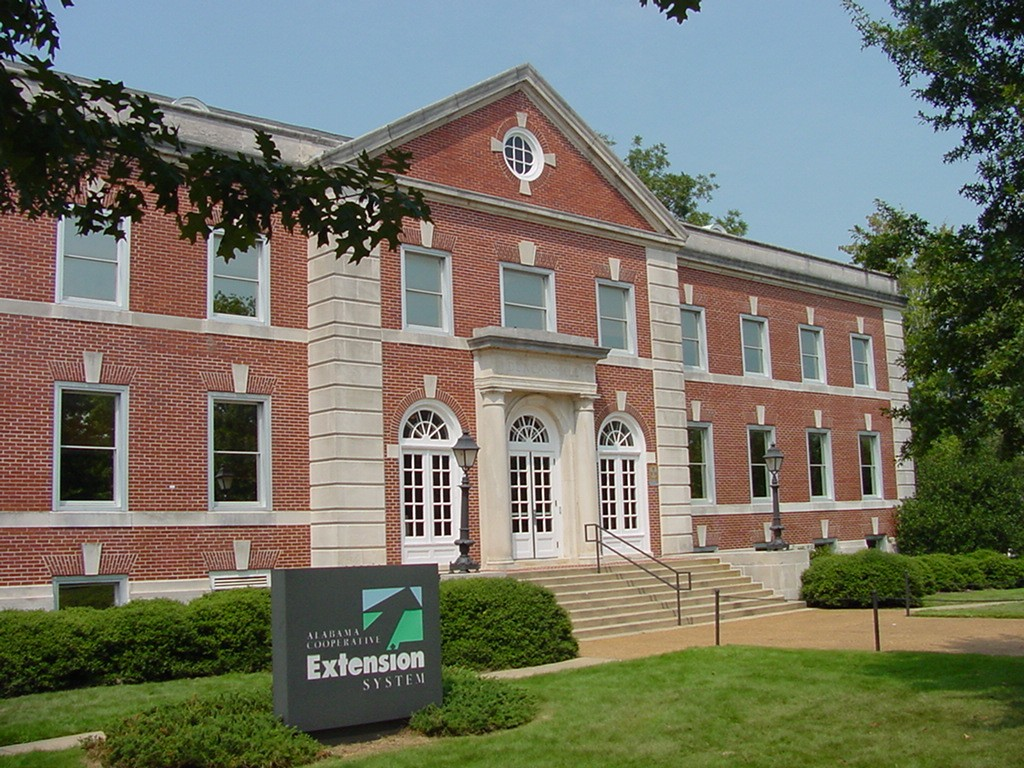
Duncan Hall is the Auburn University headquarters of the Alabama Cooperative Extension System. The building was constructed with limestone from Duncan's native Franklin County.

== Farm Bureau controversy ==
Duncan was criticized for his organization's close association with the Farm Bureau. From Cooperative Extension's inception, agents worked with a wide array of farming organizations and agencies. However, there was a closer relationship with the Farm Bureau, which organized on the AU campus at Duncan's behest in 1921. Cooperative Extension work was considered successful by supporters in providing research-based information to the state's farmers. However, much of this progress was hindered by the lack of a cooperative farm marketing mechanism, which contributed to the efforts to organize a nationwide network of Farm Bureaus. Critics argued that Duncan favored the Farm Bureau over other farm organizations and even dictated Farm Bureau policy, an allegation Duncan repeatedly denied.

Duncan's actions largely reflected those of the USDA, who supported a close relationship with the Farm Bureau. Duncan drew criticism from the USDA for acquiescing to the publication of a circular that instructed Alabama Extension agents about how to recruit Farm Bureau members and to collect their dues. The publication was subsequently withdrawn.

Duncan stated that one of the original charges of the Extension Service was to advise farm organizations. He also contended that in supporting the Farm Bureau, he was assisting the farm organization which he believed had the best prospects for success. Duncan believed that relations between Extension and Farm Bureau had been too close at times, such as when Extension agents collected dues on behalf of the Farm Bureau. However, he claimed that these problems had been resolved.

An investigation by the Auburn University Board of Trustees found no evidence of wrongdoing.

== President of Auburn University (Alabama Polytechnic Institute) ==
Duncan managed the Alabama Extension Service during a period of limited funding, leading several business and professional groups to endorse him to succeed Bradford Knapp as president of AU. Supporters argued that his management style was suited to the institution's needs following the onset of the Great Depression.

Nevertheless, Duncan's past association with the Farm Bureau continued to draw criticism from Victor Hanson, an AU trustee and the publisher of the Birmingham News. Following a statewide newspaper campaign against Duncan organized at Hanson's urging, the AU trustees, unable to reach agreement on Knapp's successor, appointed a three-man executive committee, which included Duncan, to manage the institute's affairs until final agreement could be reached on a permanent successor. Duncan's financial management during this difficult period eventually gained the support of a majority of AU trustees. Duncan was installed as the AU's president in 1935.

Duncan advocated for what he considered Auburn's fair share of state funding. While he remained a strong supporter of cooperation among Alabama's institutions of higher learning, he believed that this cooperation should never work to the detriment of AU.

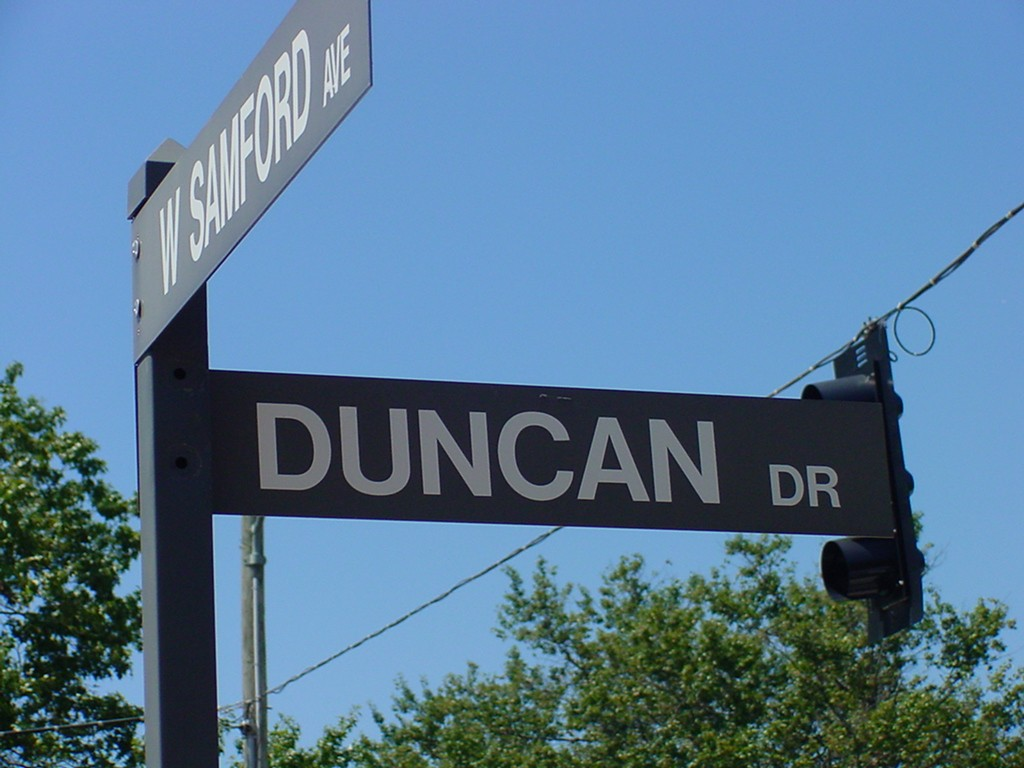
Duncan Drive on the Auburn University campus

Duncan maintained that the prevailing interpretation of the state's Teacher-Training Equalization Fund favored the University of Alabama at the AU's expense, even consigning the AU to second-class status.

Working closely with Alabama Governor Bibb Graves, U.S. Senator John H. Bankhead, and E.A. O'Neal, president of the American Farm Bureau, Duncan helped secure passage of the Bankhead-Jones Act, which increased funding for resident teaching, agricultural research, and agricultural extension.

Duncan also strongly believed that each Alabama student should receive the same level of state support regardless of the institution attended. Moreover, he also publicly advocated for a cooperative recruitment plan and the assignment of roles to Alabama and the AU so that each could "render maximum service" in the areas it was best equipped to serve. However, political opposition at the time prevented many of these plans from being fully realized in his lifetime.

Towards the end of his career, controversy resurfaced regarding Extension Service's longstanding relationship with the Alabama Farm Bureau. Incoming populist Governor James "Big Jim" Folsom, along with AU trustee and Folsom supporter Gould Beech, maintained that agriculture had suffered a relative decline due in large part to Alabama Extension, and that Extension was still engaged in improper political activity with the Farm Bureau.

== Death and legacy ==
On July 26, 1947, at the age of 71, Duncan died of a heart attack at his residence, the President's Mansion of Auburn University.

Duncan is recognized for transforming the Alabama Extension Service and the AU into driving forces on Alabama's political scene. He was an early and vocal proponent of equitable funding for Alabama's higher education.
