= Alabama Women's Hall of Fame =

Celebration of achievements of women associated with Alabama, United States

Coordinates: 32.6312°N 87.3164°W

The Alabama Women's Hall of Fame honors the achievements of women associated with the U.S. state of Alabama. Established in 1970, the first women were inducted the following year. The Hall of Fame was originally located on the campus of Judson College in Marion, Alabama. It became a state agency in 1975 by an act of the Alabama Legislature. The AWHF was moved to the University of West Alabama in Livingston in 2022. The organization is governed by an eleven-member board. They are elected to three-year terms with a minimum of one board member from the fields of art, business, community service, education, law, medicine, politics, religion, and science. In addition to the board, the President of the University of West Alabama and Governor of Alabama both serve as voting members.

== Inductees ==
Name	Image	Birth–Death	Year	Area of achievement	Ref(s)
Agnes Baggett		(1905–1992)	2025	Alabama State Auditor, State Treasurer, and Secretary of State	
Helen Shores Lee		(1941–2018)	2025	First African American woman to serve as judge on the Jefferson County Circuit Court. Daughter of attorney Arthur Shores	
Janet Nolan		(1942–2019)	2024	Found object artist	
Mary Olive Enslen Tinder		(1905–1981)	2024	Pioneer radio broadcaster and television host	
Mahala Ashley Dickerson		(1912–2007)	2023	Activist, First African American woman to pass the State Bar in Alabama and in Alaska, Recipient of the Maud McClure Kelly Award, first African American to serve as the president of the National Association of Women Lawyers.	
Alice Finch Lee		(1911–2014)	2023	One of Alabama's first female lawyers, recipient of the Maud McClure Kelly Award from the Alabama Bar Association. Sister of author Harper Lee	
Vestal Goodman		(1929–2003)	2022	"Queen of Gospel Music"	
Allison Wetherbee		(1970–2016)	2022	Advocate for persons with disabilities, 1974 Alabama March of Dimes Child	
Emera Frances Griffin		(1843–1917)	2021	President of the Alabama Woman’s Suffrage Association, first woman to address a legislative body in Alabama	
Vivian Malone Jones		(1942–2005)	2021	One of the first two black students to enroll at the University of Alabama in 1963, and in 1965 became the university's first black graduate.	
Mother Angelica		(1923–2016)	2020	Founder of Eternal Word Television Network	
Janie Shores		(1932–2017)	2020	First woman elected to the Alabama Supreme Court	
Milly Francis		(1803–1848)	2019	Native American of the Creek tribe, who survived the Trail of Tears	
Harper Lee		(1926–2016)	2019	Author of To Kill a Mockingbird	
Jessie Welch Austin		(1884–1987)	2018	Sheriff of Elmore County; warden of Julia Tutwiler Prison for Women	
Jeanne Friegel Berman		(1884–1987)	2018	Founded the Alabama League of Women Voters	
Mary Ward Brown		(1917–2013)	2017	American short-story writer and memoirist	
Sara Crews Finley		(1930–2013)	2017	Pioneer in medical genetics. Co-founded with her husband, Dr. Wayne Finley, the first medical genetics program in the southeastern United States.	
Anne Mae Beddow		(1893–1974)	2016	Nurse anesthetist and lieutenant in the Army Nurse Corps as a lieutenant; developed a technique to administer pentothal sodium intravenously	
Sarah Haynsworth Gayle		(1804–1835)	2016	Diarist who kept a journal from 1827 to 1835	
Kathryn Tucker Windham		(1918–2011)	2015	American storyteller, author, photographer, and journalist who was born in Selma and grew up in Thomasville	
Hazel Mansell Gore		(1923–2001)	2014	Australian physician who taught at the University of Alabama in Birmingham	
Zora Neale Hurston		(1891–1960)	2013	Folklorist, anthropologist, and noted author of the Harlem Renaissance.	
Frances C. Roberts		(1916–2000)	2013	Chaired the History Department at the University of Alabama in Huntsville and directed their Academic Advisement and Information Center	
Nina Miglionico		(1913–2009)	2012	First female member of the Birmingham City Council	
Evelyn Daniel Anderson		(1926–1998)	2011	Educator, community volunteer, disability rights advocate	
Ada Ruth Stovall		(1913–2008)	2011	First woman appointed Assistant State Director of Vocational Education for the Alabama Department of Education	
Mary Ivy Burks		(1920–2007)	2010	Environmental activist, conservationist, co-founder of the Alabama Conservancy	
Margaret Charles Smith		(1906–2004)	2010	Noted African American midwife	
Coretta Scott King		(1927–2006)	2009	Author, human rights activist, civil rights activist	
Rosa McCauley Parks		(1913–2005)	2008	Civil rights activist	
Fran McKee		(1926–2002)	2007	First woman line officer to hold the rank of rear admiral in the United States Navy	
Martha Crystal Myers		(1945–2002)	2007	Physician, missionary	
Virginia Foster Durr		(1903–1999)	2006	Civil rights activist	
Mary Celesta Johnson Weatherly		(1890–1976)	2006	Mother of the Year in 1962 for the state and nation	
Vera Hall		(1902–1964)	2005	Blues and folk music singer	
Juliette Hampton Morgan		(1914–1957)	2005	Librarian, author, civil rights activist	
Nancy Batson Crews		(1920–2001)	2004	Aviator, one of twenty-eight professional women pilots accepted for the Women's Auxiliary Ferrying Squadron during World War II	
Rosa Gerhardt		(1898–1975)	2004	First woman president of a bar association in the state	
Louise Branscomb		(1901–1999)	2003	Pioneer female physician, human rights advocate	
Bess Bolden Walcott		(1886–1988)	2003	Librarian, teacher, author, first African American woman to serve as a Red Cross Acting Field Director	
Idella Jones Childs		(1903–1998)	2002	Civil rights advocate	
Jane Lobman Katz		(1931–1986)	2002	Advocate for state government reform, equal rights advocate	
Ida Vines Moffett		(1905–1996)	2001	Nurse for more than 70 years	
Sibyl Pool		(1901–1973)	2001	First woman elected to a statewide office, second woman elected to the Alabama Legislature	
Florence Golson Bateman		(1891–1987)	2000	Songwriter, singer	
Maria Fearing		(1838–1937)	2000	Educator, missionary, established the Pantops Home for Girls in Luebo, Democratic Republic of the Congo	
Margaret H. Booth		(1880–1953)	1999	Educator, became principal of Demopolis High School in 1900, founded Demopolis Public Library, lecturer	
Juliet Opie Hopkins		(1818–1890)	1999	Civil War nurse	
Martha Foster Crawford		(1830–1909)	1998	First foreign missionary of the Southern Baptist Convention, she and her spouse spent over fifty years in China as missionaries	
Maria Howard Weeden		(1846–1905)	1998	Artist, author	
Hattie Hooker Wilkins		(1875–1949)	1997	Promoter of woman's suffrage, first woman elected to the Alabama Legislature	
Marion Walker Spidle		(1887–1983)	1997	Educator, university administrator, community leader	
Elizabeth Burford Bashinsky		(1867–1968)	1995	Civic leader	
Maude McKnight Lindsay		(1874–1941)	1995	Author, established the state's first free kindergarten in 1898	
Doris Marie Bender		(1911–1991)	1994	Social worker	
Lottice Howell		(1897–1982)	1994	Singer	
Ida Elizabeth Brandon Mathis		(1857–1925)	1993	Agricultural practices reformer	
Mary George Jordan Waite		(1917–1990)	1993	First woman elected president of a state banking association, extensively involved with Alabama Girls State	
Bessie Morse Bellingrath		(1878–1943)	1992	Developer of Bellingrath Gardens	
Frances Scott Fitzgerald		(1921–1986)	1992	Writer, political activist, arts patron, daughter of Zelda and F. Scott Fitzgerald	
Zelda Sayre Fitzgerald		(1900–1948)	1992	Author, ballerina, painter, wife of F. Scott Fitzgerald	
Frances Virginia Praytor		(1899–1974)	1991	Teacher, co-owner of Birmingham's Smith and Hardwick Bookstore	
Anna Linton Praytor		(1914–1989)	1991	Teacher, co-owner of Birmingham's Smith and Hardwick Bookstore	
Julia Tarrant Barron		(1805–1890)	1991	Helped establish Judson College and Howard College, co-founder of The Alabama Baptist	
Maud McLure Kelly		(1887–1973)	1990	Suffragist, genealogist, historian, first woman to practice law in Alabama (admitted to the Bar in 1908), first woman to be admitted to the Bar of the U.S. Supreme Court as a practicing lawyer in the South in 1914, inducted into the Alabama Lawyers Hall of Fame in 2014	
Octavia Walton Le Vert		(1811–1877)	1990	Socialite, Civil War nurse, author	
Gwen Bristow		(1903–1980)	1989	Author, journalist	
Geneva Mercer		(1889–1984)	1989	Artist, sculptor	
Katharine Cooper Cater		(1914–1980)	1988	Dean of Women and Dean of Student Life at Auburn University	
Mary Elizabeth Phillips Thompson		(1855–1927)	1988	First woman principal Lincoln Normal School	
Elizabeth Caroline Crosby		(1888–1983)	1987	Scientist, teacher, author	
Lella Warren		(1899–1982)	1987	Author	
Chamintney Stovall Thomas		(1899–1979)	1986	Musician, teacher, author	
Martha Strudwick Young		(1862–1941)	1986	Folklorist, author, poet	
Blanche Evans Dean		(1892–1974)	1985	Conservationist, naturalist, author	
Katherine Vickery		(1898–1978)	1985	President of the Alabama Psychological Association; fellow of the Alabama Academy of Science and of the American Association for the Advancement of Science	
Mildred Westervelt Warner		(1893–1974)	1984	President of Gulf States Paper Corporation, conservationist, philanthropist	
Katherine White-Spunner		(1892–1978)	1984	Nurse, hospital administrator	
Anne Mathilde Bilbro		(1870–1958)	1983	Composer, music teacher, author	
Clara Weaver Parrish		(1861–1925)	1983	Artist, author, designer for Tiffany Studios	
Chrysostom Moynahan		(1863–1941)	1982	Nun, first Registered Nurse licensed in Alabama, hospital administrator, founded St. Vincent's School of Nursing	
Loula Friend Dunn		(1896–1977)	1982	Alabama's Commissioner of Public Welfare, first female executive director of the American Public Welfare Association	
Tallulah Bankhead		(1903–1968)	1981	Stage, film, and voice actress.	
Elizabeth Johnston		(1851–1934)	1981	Founder of Alabama Boys' Industrial School, social service worker; also known as Mrs. R. D. Johnston	
Kathleen Moore Mallory		(1879–1954)	1980	Social services, magazine editor, Woman's Missionary Union executive	
Ruby Pickens Tartt		(1880–1974)	1980	Author, folklorist, artist, librarian	
Myrtle Brooke		(1872–1948)	1979	Educator, social services, mental health pioneer	
Carrie A. Tuggle		(1858–1924)	1979	Educator, social services, instigator of Juvenile and Domestic Courts, founder of orphanage for African Americans	
Annie Rowan Forney Daugette		(1876–1974)	1978	Author, historian, designed the Seal of Alabama	
Patti Ruffner Jacobs		(1875–1939)	1978	Political scientist, promoter of women's suffrage	
Amelia Gayle Gorgas		(1826–1913)	1977	Librarian, nurse, teacher, university counselor	
Augusta Jane Evans Wilson		(1835–1909)	1977	Author, Civil War nurse	
Ruth Robertson Berrey		(1906–1973)	1976	Physician, missionary	
Annie Lola Price		(1903–1972)	1976	Attorney, first woman to serve on high court of Alabama, Chief of Alabama Court of Criminal Appeals	
Dixie Bibb Graves		(1883–1965)	1975	Social and political services, first Alabama woman elected to the United States Senate	
Marie Bankhead Owen		(1869–1958)	1975	Author, historian, director of the Alabama Department of Archives and History	
Henrietta Gibbs		(1879–1960)	1974	Social services, youth counselor, leader of American women's causes	
Loraine Bedsole Tunstall		(1879–1953)	1974	Social services, creator of child welfare services, first woman to head a department in the state government of Alabama	
Edwina Donnelly Mitchell		(1894–1968)	1973	Humanitarian, social services, prison reformer	
Lurleen Burns Wallace		(1926–1968)	1973	First female Governor of Alabama	
Agnes Ellen Harris		(1883–1952)	1972	Educator, Dean of Women at Auburn University and University of Alabama	
Margaret Murray Washington		(1856–1925)	1972	Founder of county and industrial schools, Tuskegee Normal and Industrial Institute Principal, wife of Booker T. Washington	
Hallie Farmer		(1881–1960)	1971	Political scientist, educator, author, prison reformer	
Helen Adams Keller		(1880–1968)	1971	Deafblind author, political activist, lecturer, scholar	
Julia Strudwick Tutwiler		(1841–1916)	1971	Author, Alabama Normal College President, prison reformer, author of official state song, Alabama	
