= List of the most popular names in the 1880s in the United States =

These are the most popular given names in the United States of America for all years of the 1880s.

== 1880 ==
- Males
  1. John
  2. William
  3. James
  4. Charles
  5. George
  6. Frank
  7. Joseph
  8. Thomas
  9. Henry
  10. Robert
  11. Edward
  12. Harry
  13. Walter
  14. Arthur
  15. Fred
  16. Albert
  17. Samuel
  18. David
  19. Louis
  20. Joe
  21. Charlie
  22. Clarence
  23. Richard
  24. Andrew
  25. Daniel
  26. Ernest
  27. Will
  28. Jesse
  29. Oscar
  30. Lewis
  31. Peter
  32. Benjamin
  33. Frederick
  34. Willie
  35. Alfred
  36. Sam
  37. Roy
  38. Herbert
  39. Jacob
  40. Tom
  41. Elmer
  42. Carl
  43. Lee
  44. Howard
  45. Martin
  46. Michael
  47. Bert
  48. Herman
  49. Jim
  50. Francis
- Females
  1. Mary
  2. Anna
  3. Emma
  4. Elizabeth
  5. Minnie
  6. Margaret
  7. Ida
  8. Alice
  9. Bertha
  10. Sarah
  11. Annie
  12. Clara
  13. Ella
  14. Florence
  15. Cora
  16. Martha
  17. Laura
  18. Nellie
  19. Grace
  20. Carrie
  21. Maude
  22. Mabel
  23. Bessie
  24. Jennie
  25. Gertrude
  26. Julia
  27. Hattie
  28. Edith
  29. Mattie
  30. Rose
  31. Catherine
  32. Lillian
  33. Ada
  34. Lillie
  35. Helen
  36. Jessie
  37. Louise
  38. Ethel
  39. Lula
  40. Myrtle
  41. Eva
  42. Frances
  43. Lena
  44. Lucy
  45. Edna
  46. Maggie
  47. Pearl
  48. Daisy
  49. Fannie
  50. Josephine

== 1881 ==
- Males
  1. John
  2. William
  3. James
  4. George
  5. Charles
  6. Frank
  7. Joseph
  8. Henry
  9. Thomas
  10. Edward
  11. Robert
  12. Harry
  13. Walter
  14. Arthur
  15. Fred
  16. Albert
  17. Samuel
  18. David
  19. Louis
  20. Charlie
  21. Clarence
  22. Richard
  23. Joe
  24. Andrew
  25. Ernest
  26. Will
  27. Jesse
  28. Oscar
  29. Daniel
  30. Willie
  31. Benjamin
  32. Sam
  33. Alfred
  34. Roy
  35. Lewis
  36. Frederick
  37. Peter
  38. Elmer
  39. Jacob
  40. Herbert
  41. Carl
  42. Howard
  43. Tom
  44. Lee
  45. Ralph
  46. Martin
  47. Jim
  48. Earl
  49. Eugene
  50. Bert
- Females
  1. Mary
  2. Anna
  3. Emma
  4. Elizabeth
  5. Margaret
  6. Minnie
  7. Ida
  8. Annie
  9. Bertha
  10. Alice
  11. Clara
  12. Sarah
  13. Ella
  14. Nellie
  15. Grace
  16. Florence
  17. Martha
  18. Cora
  19. Laura
  20. Carrie
  21. Maude
  22. Bessie
  23. Mabel
  24. Gertrude
  25. Ethel
  26. Jennie
  27. Edith
  28. Hattie
  29. Mattie
  30. Julia
  31. Rose
  32. Lillian
  33. Lillie
  34. Eva
  35. Jessie
  36. Lula
  37. Myrtle
  38. Pearl
  39. Edna
  40. Catherine
  41. Ada
  42. Louise
  43. Helen
  44. Lucy
  45. Frances
  46. Dora
  47. Fannie
  48. Josephine
  49. Daisy
  50. Lena

== 1882 ==
- Males
  1. John
  2. William
  3. James
  4. George
  5. Charles
  6. Frank
  7. Joseph
  8. Thomas
  9. Henry
  10. Robert
  11. Edward
  12. Harry
  13. Walter
  14. Arthur
  15. Fred
  16. Albert
  17. Samuel
  18. Louis
  19. David
  20. Clarence
  21. Charlie
  22. Richard
  23. Joe
  24. Andrew
  25. Will
  26. Jesse
  27. Ernest
  28. Oscar
  29. Daniel
  30. Sam
  31. Willie
  32. Alfred
  33. Roy
  34. Benjamin
  35. Carl
  36. Peter
  37. Frederick
  38. Elmer
  39. Lewis
  40. Herbert
  41. Lee
  42. Howard
  43. Ralph
  44. Paul
  45. Jim
  46. Jacob
  47. Tom
  48. Martin
  49. Earl
  50. Claude
- Females
  1. Mary
  2. Anna
  3. Emma
  4. Elizabeth
  5. Minnie
  6. Margaret
  7. Ida
  8. Alice
  9. Bertha
  10. Annie
  11. Clara
  12. Sarah
  13. Florence
  14. Martha
  15. Ella
  16. Grace
  17. Laura
  18. Bessie
  19. Nellie
  20. Maude
  21. Cora
  22. Carrie
  23. Mabel
  24. Ethel
  25. Mattie
  26. Gertrude
  27. Jennie
  28. Rose
  29. Edith
  30. Hattie
  31. Helen
  32. Lillian
  33. Pearl
  34. Louise
  35. Julia
  36. Lillie
  37. Jessie
  38. Myrtle
  39. Edna
  40. Lula
  41. Eva
  42. Catherine
  43. Lena
  44. Ada
  45. Frances
  46. Lucy
  47. Fannie
  48. Daisy
  49. Josephine
  50. Maggie

== 1883 ==
- Males
  1. John
  2. William
  3. James
  4. Charles
  5. George
  6. Frank
  7. Joseph
  8. Henry
  9. Robert
  10. Thomas
  11. Edward
  12. Harry
  13. Walter
  14. Arthur
  15. Fred
  16. Albert
  17. Samuel
  18. Clarence
  19. Louis
  20. David
  21. Richard
  22. Charlie
  23. Ernest
  24. Andrew
  25. Daniel
  26. Joe
  27. Oscar
  28. Jesse
  29. Will
  30. Roy
  31. Benjamin
  32. Carl
  33. Sam
  34. Willie
  35. Alfred
  36. Peter
  37. Frederick
  38. Lewis
  39. Howard
  40. Elmer
  41. Herbert
  42. Earl
  43. Lee
  44. Tom
  45. Ralph
  46. Martin
  47. Herman
  48. Paul
  49. Jacob
  50. Clyde
- Females
  1. Mary
  2. Anna
  3. Emma
  4. Elizabeth
  5. Minnie
  6. Margaret
  7. Bertha
  8. Ida
  9. Annie
  10. Clara
  11. Alice
  12. Sarah
  13. Grace
  14. Florence
  15. Martha
  16. Ella
  17. Nellie
  18. Bessie
  19. Laura
  20. Ethel
  21. Carrie
  22. Maude
  23. Mabel
  24. Cora
  25. Gertrude
  26. Lillian
  27. Jennie
  28. Hattie
  29. Pearl
  30. Mattie
  31. Edith
  32. Eva
  33. Rose
  34. Julia
  35. Helen
  36. Catherine
  37. Myrtle
  38. Louise
  39. Lillie
  40. Jessie
  41. Edna
  42. Lena
  43. Lula
  44. Ada
  45. Frances
  46. Josephine
  47. Fannie
  48. Lucy
  49. Maggie
  50. Daisy

== 1884 ==
- Males
  1. John
  2. William
  3. James
  4. George
  5. Charles
  6. Frank
  7. Joseph
  8. Thomas
  9. Henry
  10. Robert
  11. Edward
  12. Harry
  13. Walter
  14. Arthur
  15. Fred
  16. Albert
  17. Samuel
  18. Clarence
  19. Louis
  20. Grover
  21. David
  22. Joe
  23. Richard
  24. Charlie
  25. Ernest
  26. Roy
  27. Jesse
  28. Will
  29. Andrew
  30. Oscar
  31. Willie
  32. Daniel
  33. Sam
  34. Peter
  35. Elmer
  36. Carl
  37. Alfred
  38. Benjamin
  39. Lewis
  40. Earl
  41. Ralph
  42. Frederick
  43. Lee
  44. Howard
  45. Paul
  46. Herbert
  47. Tom
  48. Herman
  49. Martin
  50. Jacob
- Females
  1. Mary
  2. Anna
  3. Emma
  4. Elizabeth
  5. Minnie
  6. Margaret
  7. Ida
  8. Clara
  9. Bertha
  10. Annie
  11. Alice
  12. Florence
  13. Grace
  14. Sarah
  15. Bessie
  16. Martha
  17. Nellie
  18. Ethel
  19. Ella
  20. Mabel
  21. Laura
  22. Carrie
  23. Cora
  24. Maude
  25. Pearl
  26. Lillian
  27. Edith
  28. Gertrude
  29. Jennie
  30. Rose
  31. Mattie
  32. Hattie
  33. Helen
  34. Myrtle
  35. Louise
  36. Edna
  37. Julia
  38. Eva
  39. Lula
  40. Lillie
  41. Lena
  42. Jessie
  43. Catherine
  44. Ada
  45. Josephine
  46. Frances
  47. Lucy
  48. Maggie
  49. Marie
  50. Fannie

== 1885 ==
- Males
  1. John
  2. William
  3. James
  4. George
  5. Charles
  6. Frank
  7. Joseph
  8. Henry
  9. Robert
  10. Thomas
  11. Edward
  12. Harry
  13. Walter
  14. Fred
  15. Arthur
  16. Albert
  17. Clarence
  18. Samuel
  19. Louis
  20. Grover
  21. Ernest
  22. David
  23. Charlie
  24. Roy
  25. Joe
  26. Richard
  27. Will
  28. Oscar
  29. Willie
  30. Andrew
  31. Jesse
  32. Daniel
  33. Peter
  34. Carl
  35. Sam
  36. Earl
  37. Frederick
  38. Benjamin
  39. Alfred
  40. Elmer
  41. Howard
  42. Lewis
  43. Paul
  44. Ralph
  45. Herbert
  46. Jim
  47. Michael
  48. Tom
  49. Martin
  50. Lee
- Females
  1. Mary
  2. Anna
  3. Emma
  4. Elizabeth
  5. Margaret
  6. Minnie
  7. Clara
  8. Bertha
  9. Ida
  10. Annie
  11. Alice
  12. Florence
  13. Bessie
  14. Grace
  15. Ethel
  16. Nellie
  17. Martha
  18. Sarah
  19. Ella
  20. Mabel
  21. Laura
  22. Carrie
  23. Cora
  24. Maude
  25. Rose
  26. Pearl
  27. Lillian
  28. Helen
  29. Gertrude
  30. Edna
  31. Edith
  32. Julia
  33. Jennie
  34. Myrtle
  35. Mattie
  36. Hattie
  37. Lillie
  38. Eva
  39. Louise
  40. Jessie
  41. Lula
  42. Marie
  43. Ada
  44. Lena
  45. Catherine
  46. Frances
  47. Fannie
  48. Josephine
  49. Dora
  50. Katherine

== 1886 ==
- Males
  1. John
  2. William
  3. James
  4. George
  5. Charles
  6. Frank
  7. Joseph
  8. Robert
  9. Henry
  10. Thomas
  11. Edward
  12. Harry
  13. Walter
  14. Arthur
  15. Fred
  16. Albert
  17. Clarence
  18. Samuel
  19. Louis
  20. Roy
  21. Joe
  22. Charlie
  23. Richard
  24. David
  25. Ernest
  26. Oscar
  27. Will
  28. Willie
  29. Andrew
  30. Jesse
  31. Earl
  32. Carl
  33. Daniel
  34. Sam
  35. Elmer
  36. Alfred
  37. Howard
  38. Paul
  39. Benjamin
  40. Frederick
  41. Ralph
  42. Peter
  43. Lewis
  44. Herman
  45. Grover
  46. Herbert
  47. Lee
  48. Claude
  49. Jim
  50. Tom
- Females
  1. Mary
  2. Anna
  3. Emma
  4. Elizabeth
  5. Minnie
  6. Margaret
  7. Ida
  8. Bertha
  9. Clara
  10. Florence
  11. Alice
  12. Bessie
  13. Annie
  14. Grace
  15. Ethel
  16. Sarah
  17. Nellie
  18. Martha
  19. Ella
  20. Mabel
  21. Carrie
  22. Laura
  23. Edna
  24. Lillian
  25. Helen
  26. Rose
  27. Gertrude
  28. Cora
  29. Pearl
  30. Maude
  31. Edith
  32. Eva
  33. Hattie
  34. Jennie
  35. Myrtle
  36. Julia
  37. Louise
  38. Frances
  39. Mattie
  40. Lula
  41. Jessie
  42. Lillie
  43. Lena
  44. Marie
  45. Catherine
  46. Ada
  47. Josephine
  48. Fannie
  49. Dora
  50. Lucy

== 1887 ==
- Males
  1. John
  2. William
  3. James
  4. George
  5. Charles
  6. Frank
  7. Joseph
  8. Henry
  9. Thomas
  10. Edward
  11. Robert
  12. Harry
  13. Walter
  14. Arthur
  15. Fred
  16. Albert
  17. Clarence
  18. Samuel
  19. Louis
  20. Roy
  21. Joe
  22. David
  23. Ernest
  24. Charlie
  25. Richard
  26. Jesse
  27. Willie
  28. Carl
  29. Oscar
  30. Will
  31. Daniel
  32. Earl
  33. Andrew
  34. Benjamin
  35. Alfred
  36. Elmer
  37. Frederick
  38. Ralph
  39. Sam
  40. Paul
  41. Herbert
  42. Howard
  43. Peter
  44. Lee
  45. Herman
  46. Claude
  47. Raymond
  48. Michael
  49. Lewis
  50. Jim
- Females
  1. Mary
  2. Anna
  3. Elizabeth
  4. Emma
  5. Margaret
  6. Minnie
  7. Bertha
  8. Clara
  9. Florence
  10. Ida
  11. Ethel
  12. Annie
  13. Bessie
  14. Alice
  15. Grace
  16. Ella
  17. Martha
  18. Mabel
  19. Nellie
  20. Sarah
  21. Helen
  22. Laura
  23. Carrie
  24. Edna
  25. Pearl
  26. Lillian
  27. Cora
  28. Gertrude
  29. Edith
  30. Rose
  31. Maude
  32. Hattie
  33. Eva
  34. Frances
  35. Louise
  36. Myrtle
  37. Lillie
  38. Jennie
  39. Julia
  40. Mattie
  41. Jessie
  42. Lena
  43. Marie
  44. Catherine
  45. Ada
  46. Agnes
  47. Lula
  48. Dora
  49. Elsie
  50. Josephine

== 1888 ==
- Males
  1. John
  2. William
  3. James
  4. George
  5. Charles
  6. Frank
  7. Joseph
  8. Robert
  9. Harry
  10. Henry
  11. Edward
  12. Thomas
  13. Walter
  14. Arthur
  15. Fred
  16. Albert
  17. Clarence
  18. Samuel
  19. Louis
  20. Roy
  21. David
  22. Charlie
  23. Joe
  24. Willie
  25. Benjamin
  26. Richard
  27. Ernest
  28. Will
  29. Carl
  30. Earl
  31. Oscar
  32. Jesse
  33. Andrew
  34. Sam
  35. Daniel
  36. Ralph
  37. Alfred
  38. Paul
  39. Elmer
  40. Howard
  41. Peter
  42. Frederick
  43. Herbert
  44. Grover
  45. Raymond
  46. Michael
  47. Ben
  48. Lee
  49. Tom
  50. Lewis
- Females
  1. Mary
  2. Anna
  3. Elizabeth
  4. Emma
  5. Margaret
  6. Minnie
  7. Bertha
  8. Florence
  9. Ethel
  10. Bessie
  11. Clara
  12. Ida
  13. Alice
  14. Annie
  15. Grace
  16. Helen
  17. Mabel
  18. Ella
  19. Martha
  20. Sarah
  21. Nellie
  22. Edna
  23. Lillian
  24. Carrie
  25. Laura
  26. Pearl
  27. Rose
  28. Gertrude
  29. Edith
  30. Frances
  31. Cora
  32. Maude
  33. Louise
  34. Eva
  35. Myrtle
  36. Hattie
  37. Jennie
  38. Julia
  39. Mattie
  40. Marie
  41. Lillie
  42. Catherine
  43. Jessie
  44. Lula
  45. Lena
  46. Ada
  47. Elsie
  48. Agnes
  49. Josephine
  50. Fannie

== 1889 ==
- Males
  1. John
  2. William
  3. James
  4. George
  5. Charles
  6. Frank
  7. Joseph
  8. Harry
  9. Robert
  10. Edward
  11. Henry
  12. Thomas
  13. Walter
  14. Arthur
  15. Fred
  16. Albert
  17. Clarence
  18. Roy
  19. Louis
  20. Samuel
  21. Benjamin
  22. David
  23. Ernest
  24. Richard
  25. Joe
  26. Willie
  27. Carl
  28. Earl
  29. Charlie
  30. Will
  31. Jessie
  32. Oscar
  33. Andrew
  34. Elmer
  35. Paul
  36. Daniel
  37. Raymond
  38. Howard
  39. Ralph
  40. Sam
  41. Alfred
  42. Herbert
  43. Ben
  44. Frederick
  45. Peter
  46. Lee
  47. Lewis
  48. Herman
  49. Claude
  50. Tom
- Females
  1. Mary
  2. Anna
  3. Elizabeth
  4. Margaret
  5. Emma
  6. Minnie
  7. Florence
  8. Ethel
  9. Bessie
  10. Clara
  11. Bertha
  12. Alice
  13. Annie
  14. Ida
  15. Grace
  16. Mabel
  17. Helen
  18. Edna
  19. Nellie
  20. Sarah
  21. Martha
  22. Ella
  23. Lillian
  24. Pearl
  25. Laura
  26. Rose
  27. Carrie
  28. Gertrude
  29. Edith
  30. Marie
  31. Eva
  32. Cora
  33. Myrtle
  34. Frances
  35. Hattie
  36. Maude
  37. Lillie
  38. Louise
  39. Jennie
  40. Julia
  41. Elsie
  42. Catherine
  43. Jessie
  44. Mattie
  45. Lena
  46. Ruth
  47. Lula
  48. Hazel
  49. Josephine
  50. Agnes

== See also ==
- Popularity of birth names for females (United States)
