= Mary Burks =

Mary Burks may refer to:

- Mary Fair Burks (1914–1991), American educator, scholar, and activist
- Mary Ivy Burks (1920–2007), American environmental activist
