= T.K. Thorne =

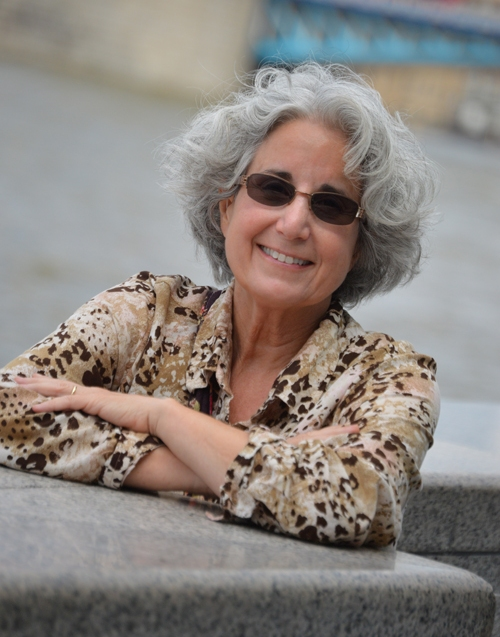
- T.K. Thorne, Author
- Born: April 17, 1954; Montgomery, Alabama
- Occupation: American Writer
- Education: Masters of Social Work, University of Alabama
- Spouse: Roger Thorne
- Children: Step-mother to three sons (Mac, Jeremiah and Harry)

Website
- www.tkthorne.com

Teresa (Katz) Thorne (born April 17, 1954) is an American writer and retired police captain.

== Early life and education ==
T.K Thorne was born on April 17, 1954, in Montgomery, Alabama, to father Warren Katz, a WWII veteran and civilian engineer at the Charleston Naval Shipyard, and mother, Jane Lobman Katz, who was inducted into the Alabama Women's Hall of Fame in 2002 for her own achievements in lobbying and activism. She has a brother and sister. Thorne's grandmother Dorothy Merz Lobman encouraged's Thorne's passion for reading and social reform.

Thorne completed a Master of Social Work at the University of Alabama.

== Career ==
After an internship with the Birmingham Police Department, Thorne was hired as their first Jewish female officer in 1977. She retired as a captain and assumed an Executive Director position with City Action Partnership (CAP) in Birmingham.

Thorne has served as faculty at several writers' conferences and spoken on lecture circuits (including Columbus State University, Colgate University and Wake Forrest University on the Birmingham bombing).

=== Literary career ===
Thorne's novels are reinterpreted stories told from the perspectives of unnamed, briefly-mentioned women of the Bible: the wives of Noah and Lot. They are influenced by archeological findings and academic research as well as Thorne's personal travels.

Thorne carried a monthly column in Birmingham's Synergy Magazine for seven years. She has also written poetry, short stories and screenplays.

== Bibliography ==
=== Historical fiction ===
- Noah's Wife (Chalet Publishing, 2009, Blackburn Fork Publishing, 2011)
- Angels at the Gate (Cappuccino Books, 2015)
- Magic City Stories novels (2018 onwards)

=== Historical nonfiction ===
- Last Chance for Justice: How Relentless Investigators Uncovered New Evidence Convicting the Birmingham Church Bombers (Lawrence Books, 2013)
- Behind the Magic Curtain: Secrets, Spies, and Unsung White Allies of Birmingham’s Civil Rights Days (New South Books, 2021)

== Awards ==
A short film developed from her screenplay "Six Blocks Wide" (Shapefilms, 2007) was a semi-finalist at the international A Film for Peace Festival in Italy.

Noah's Wife won Gold in the Historical Fiction category for the 2009 Foreword Independent Books reviews.

== Personal life ==
Thorne currently resides in Springville, Alabama, with her husband, two dogs, a cat and a horse. She is the step-mother of three children, a grandmother of four, and is also a Yondan (4th degree black belt) in Tomiki Ryu Akidio.
