= Joab Thomas =

American academic

15th President of the Pennsylvania State University
- In office September 1, 1990 – August 31, 1995
- Preceded by: Bryce Jordan
- Succeeded by: Graham Spanier

Chancellor of the North Carolina State University
- In office 1976–1981

President of The University of Alabama
- In office 1981–1988

Personal details
- Born: February 14, 1933 Holt, Alabama
- Died: March 3, 2014 (aged 81) Tuscaloosa, Alabama
- Education: Harvard University

Joab Langston Thomas (February 14, 1933 – March 3, 2014) was an American university administrator and scientist, who served as president of Pennsylvania State University, North Carolina State University and The University of Alabama.

== Early life and education ==
Thomas was born in Holt and grew up in Russellville, Alabama. His father, Ralph Cage Thomas, was the town's superintendent of education; his mother, Chamintney Stovall Thomas, was a music teacher. He was educated at Harvard University where he earned bachelors, masters, and doctoral degrees in biological sciences with a concentration in botany.

== Academic career ==
He served as a professor of biology at The University of Alabama from 1961 until his subsequent appointment as assistant dean of the College of Arts and Sciences, followed by his appointment as vice president for student affairs in 1969. He was inducted into Omicron Delta Kappa as a faculty/staff initiate in 1967.

Thomas took the position of chancellor at North Carolina State University in 1976; he was the school's ninth chief executive. While in office, enrollment at the university grew by 25 percent and surpassed 20,000 for the first time. He oversaw the establishment of the School of Veterinary Medicine, the Center for Economic and Business Studies, the North Carolina Japan Center, and the Caldwell Fellows scholarship program. Thomas resigned as chancellor in 1981. A partial manuscript collection related to Joab Langston Thomas is housed in the NCSU Libraries Special Collections Research Center in D.H. Hill Library. In addition, Thomas Hall was named in his honor in 2009.

In 1981 Thomas returned to The University of Alabama to serve as the school's president, an office he held until 1988. During his presidency, the university tripled research funding, raised admission standards, established a core curriculum and a University-wide honors program, and initiated the Presidential Scholars program to recruit top students. He also helped develop the UA Arboretum and served as its second director. A notable hire of his presidency at Alabama was that of Ray Perkins to succeed Bear Bryant as the school's football coach in December 1982. Thomas later hired Bill Curry to succeed Perkins in 1987 when Perkins left to become coach of the National Football League's Tampa Bay Buccaneers.

He served as president of Pennsylvania State University from 1990 to 1995, where he oversaw the largest building program in the university's history and oversaw Penn State's entry into the Big 10 athletic conference. The Thomas Building on Penn State's University Park campus is named in his honor, and houses parts of the Eberly College of Science, including the Department of Statistics.

== Other accomplishments ==
Thomas was a member of the academic honor societies Omicron Delta Kappa, Phi Beta Kappa, and Sigma Xi. In 2001 Omicron Delta Kappa honored him with the Laurel Crowned Circle Award, the society's highest honor. He was co-author of several books, including Wildflowers of Alabama and Adjoining States (1973), Poisonous Plants and Venomous Animals of Alabama and Adjoining States (1990), and The Rising South (1976), as well as numerous articles. Beginning in 1976, Thomas served on the Board of Directors of three agricultural research centers related to the World Health Organization: The International Potato Center (Peru), ISNAR (Netherlands), and the International Fund for Agricultural Research (CGIAR, in Kenya) were involved in research and outreach to provide better sources of food around the world. He traveled several times each year to meet agricultural authorities and visit research facilities where this work was being done. He received honorary doctorate degrees from The University of Alabama, North Carolina State University, Stillman College and Tri-State University.

== Death ==
Thomas died in Tuscaloosa, Alabama, on March 3, 2014, from natural causes at the age of 81.
