= Katharine Cooper Cater =

American academic administrator

- Born: September 1, 1914
- Died: July 23, 1980 (aged 65)
- Resting place: Rosehill Cemetery, Bibb County, Georgia
- Monuments: Katharine Cooper Cater Hall
- Education: Limestone University
- Occupations: Dean of Women, Dean of Student Life
- Honours: Inducted into the Alabama Women's Hall of Fame (1988)

Katharine Cooper Cater was an American academic administrator. She was the Dean of Women at Auburn University from 1946 to 1975 and later became the Dean of Student Life there. Cater was born on September 1, 1914, and died at the age of 65 on July 23, 1980. She was buried in Rosehill Cemetery in Bibb County, Georgia.

== Early life ==
=== Education ===
Cater obtained two master's degrees, one while at Mercer University and another from Syracuse University. She was also awarded an honorary doctorate from her alma mater, Limestone University (formerly known as Limestone College) in Gaffney, South Carolina.

=== Career ===
Shortly after graduation, Cater was selected to be Auburn University's Dean of Women by Luther N. Duncan, President of Auburn from 1935 to 1947. Cater's time as a Dean left a noticeable impact at Auburn: presidents who succeeded Duncan stated that she was 'the best Dean of Women in the South' (Ralph Brown Draughon) and also noted that Cater had 'superior administrative skills in handling her diverse responsibilities' (Harry M. Philpott).

== Achievements ==
=== Katharine Cooper Cater Hall ===
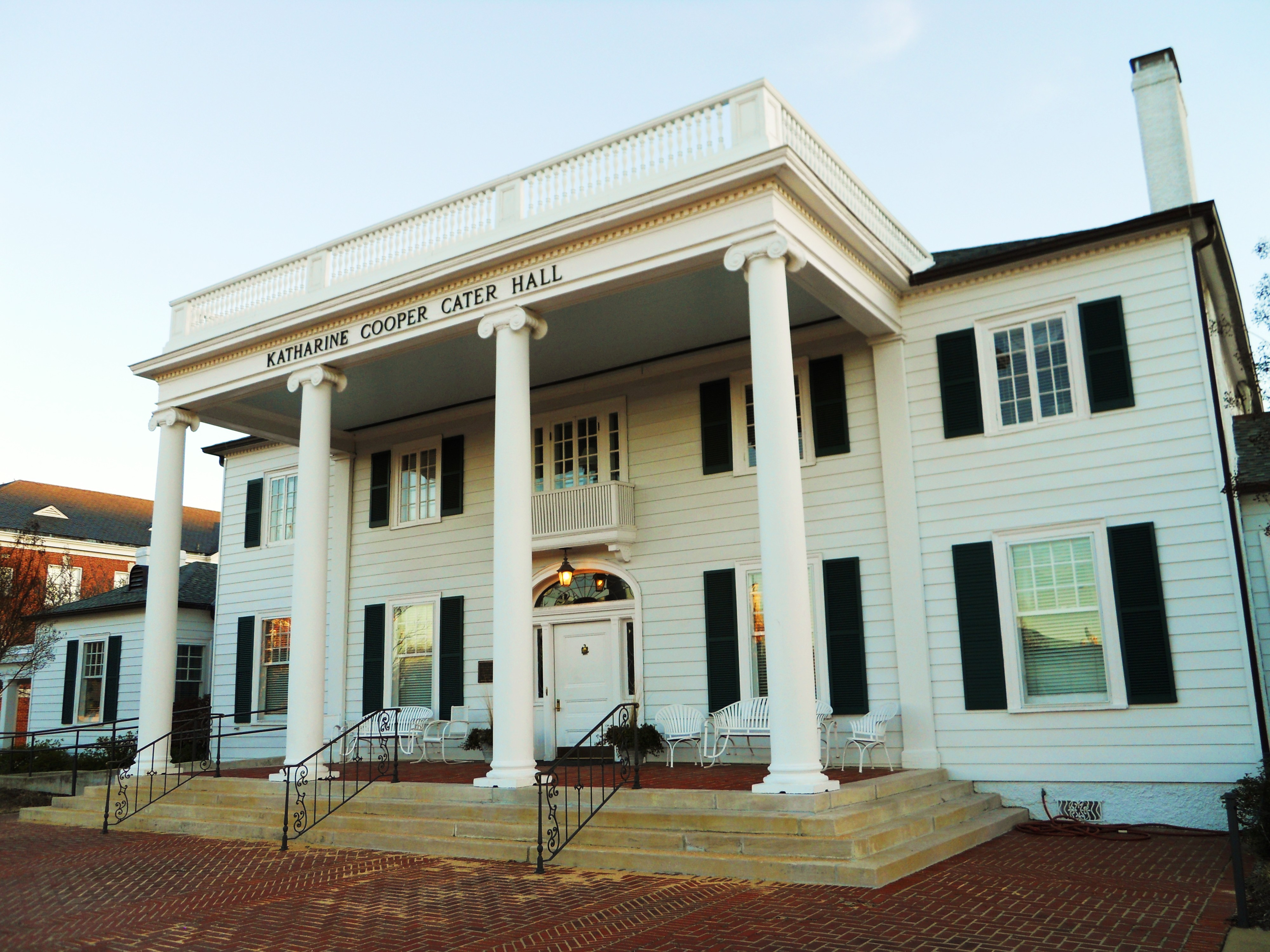
Katharine Cooper Cater Hall

In 1980 Katharine Cooper Cater Hall was renamed after Cater, who died that same year. The building had previously been known as the Old President's Mansion as four Auburn presidents took up residency there for at least some duration of their role. It is situated on the grounds of Auburn University and is on the National Register of Historic Places. The hall is now the home of Auburn University's educational support services, although in-between being a place for the current president to reside and its current use it was a social centre for dorms which were built onto the south of the building in 1940. Katharine Cooper Cater Hall was designed by Joseph Hudnut and was erected for around 17 thousand dollars.

=== Alabama Women's Hall of Fame ===
Some years after Cater's death, in 1988, she was inducted into the Alabama Women's Hall of Fame. The Hall of Fame was established in order to honour women who are connected in some way to Alabama and who have also achieved great things, and is somewhere people may come to learn about these women and their contributions to the world. It opened in 1970 and is located on the campus of Judson College, Marion, Alabama. Currently there are 91 inductees, including notable women such as author Harper Lee and civil rights activist Rosa Parks.
