= Mary Ivy Burks =

American environmental activist

- Born: Mary Louise Ivy; December 11, 1920; Birmingham, Alabama, U.S.
- Died: February 16, 2007 (aged 86)
- Education: Birmingham–Southern College
- Occupations: Environmental activist; reporter
- Known for: Co-founder and first president of the Alabama Conservancy; "mother of Alabama wilderness"; efforts to save the Sipsey Wilderness
- Awards: Alabama Women's Hall of Fame (2010)

Mary Ivy Burks (December 11, 1920 – February 16, 2007) was an environmental activist who helped create and served as the first president of the Alabama Conservancy, an organization aimed at preserving Alabama's environment.

== Biography ==
Burks was born Mary Louise Ivy in Birmingham, Alabama, to Earl and Lorene Ivy, on December 11, 1920. She obtained her degree in English from Birmingham–Southern College in 1942. After graduating, she began working as a reporter for the local newspaper, the Birmingham Post. In 1946, she married organic chemist Robert E Burks Jr. The two had a son, Robert Ivy Burks, and she spent most of her time caring for their child. While volunteering in the community she met Blanche Evans Dean, an activist and self-trained botanist in the area.

She was nicknamed "the mother of Alabama wilderness" because of her contribution to Alabama's environmental policy changes.

== Alabama Conservancy ==
By the 1960s Burks and other members of the Birmingham Audubon Society felt that Alabama's environmental policies needed help and needed a non-profit organization separate from the state. In 1967, the Alabama Conservancy was established and hosted its first meeting in the Burks's home.

The Conservancy's first official task was to save Dismals Canyon. Dismals Canyon is a nature park in Franklin County, Alabama, that is the home to dismalites, rare glowworms that attract food and mates by releasing a bright green light. The Conservancy wanted to stop the buying of this park by commercial companies and sought help from national organization, The Nature Conservancy. This project failed because the potential backer at The Nature Conservancy believed the price of the canyon was too high, but this project spurred the development of the state-specific Alabama Conservancy.

The Alabama Conservancy is now named the Alabama Environment Council.

== Saving the Sipsey Wilderness ==
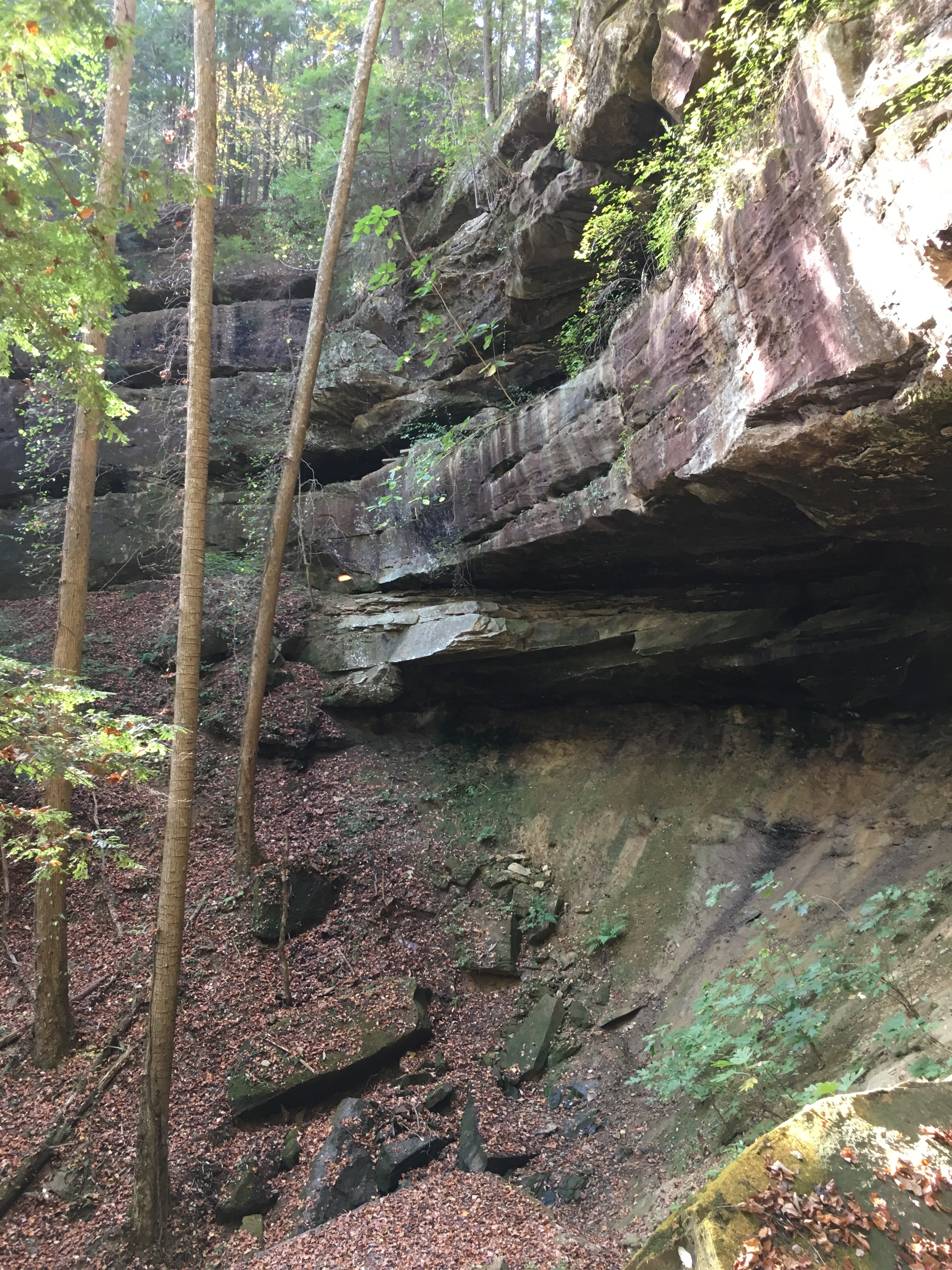
Sipsey Wilderness, 2016

The Wilderness Act of 1964 posed a threat to national forest around the nation. During this time, Congress did not view national forest as recreational; instead national forests were largely used for cutting timber. In 1969, the Conservancy took effort in supervising the cutting of trees in Alabama's oldest national forest, the Bankhead National Forest. The group began to perform field studies with the hopes of gaining the support of Del Thorton, Alabama's forest supervisor. The first small victory in the process was the suspension of timber cutting and road construction for a year. The group still had a long way to go to protect the Sipsey Wilderness by getting it recognized on the National Wilderness Preservation System.

After years of constructing ideas and collaborating with Alabama politicians, Burks spoke in front of Congress to protect 12,000 acres of land in the Sipsey Wilderness despite Congress only offering to cover 9,400 acres. Her fight for the Sipsey ultimately led to the 1974 Eastern Wilderness Act. On January 3, 1975, legislation was signed to protect the Sipsey Wilderness.

== Legacy ==
Burks died on February 16, 2007. Up until her death she continued to volunteer her time and services to the Conservancy. In 2010, she was inducted in the Alabama Women's Hall of Fame.
