= Annie Rowan Forney Daugette =

American author and historian (1876–1974)

- Born: June 1, 1876
- Died: September 11, 1974 (aged 98)
- Occupations: American author and historian

Annie Rowan Forney Daugette (June 1, 1876 – September 11, 1974) was an American author and historian. The daughter of a confederate general, she influenced a passage to restore the current Seal of Alabama, and started a resolution to return the flag of the Republic of Alabama back from Iowa. She was inducted into the Alabama Women's Hall of Fame in 1978.

== Early years ==
Born on June 1, 1876, Daugette was the daughter of Confederate Major General John H. Forney and Septima Sexta Middleton, née Rutledge. Her father gained fame for his actions in the Siege of Vicksburg and for early campaigning within Virginia. She had one sister, Sabina Forney Stevenson. Daugette grew up in Jacksonville, Alabama, and was educated at Jacksonville State Normal School (now called Jacksonville State University). She was awarded the Elliot Bronze Medal in 1894 for creating the best drawing of heads, while attending art class at Cooper Union Art School and National Academy Museum and School. She married Dr. Clarence William Daugette on December 22, 1897, with whom she had four children and placed dedication towards her family as well as his career.

== Political achievements ==
Daugette served as president of United Daughters of the Confederacy's Alabama division between 1937 and 1939 where she began a campaign to restore the original Great Seal of Alabama and managed a campaign which resulted in unanimous approval from the 1939 General Assembly of Alabama. Daugette made alterations to the seal, and was later made the Honorary Life President of the United Daughters of the Confederacy on May 10, 1952. She also helped to influence passage of a resolution introduced by Senator J. Lister Hill, designating "The War Between the States" as the proper term for the American Civil War, and this led to her name being entered into the Congressional Record. Daugette instigated the effort in the return of the long-lost flag of the Republic of Alabama which was located in Iowa to Montgomery, and later regarded it as one of her greatest achievements. She additionally helped to donate a large number of books on Alabama and the Southern United States to libraries across Alabama, Daugette also created confederate and US flags which were presented to several organizations across Alabama. She was awarded the Honorary Doctor of Humanities by Jacksonville State University in 1970.

== Death and legacy ==
Daugette died on the morning of September 11, 1974, at Piedmont Hospital following a short illness at the age of 98. On October 26, 1978, Daugette was inducted into the Alabama Women's Hall of Fame, which Jacksonville declared to be "Annie Rowan Forney Daugette Day". She has been described by The Anniston Star as the "Betsy Ross of Alabama" and as "a true daughter of the Old South"; she was known by the locals as a "charming hostess" at her Jacksonville home, called "The Magnolias", where she was anxious over its restoration.
