= Ruth Robertson Berrey =

American pediatrician and missionary (1906–1973)

- Born: August 6, 1906
- Died: July 23, 1973 (aged 66)
- Occupations: Pediatrician, missionary to Nigeria

Ruth Robertson Berrey (August 6, 1906 – July 23, 1973) was an American pediatrician, educator, and a medical missionary to Nigeria. Berrey was active within the Alabama Pediatric Society and became a fellow in the American Academy of Pediatrics. As a medical missionary, she helped children in Nigeria and helped reduce leprosy in the population. As a public health officer in four Alabama counties, she conducted clinics for the detection of tuberculosis, cancer, diabetes, sickle cell anemia, and other diseases.

== Personal life ==
Berrey was born in Clayton, Alabama on August 6, 1906, to Dr. William Henry and Mary Foster Robertson. She had two brothers, William and Arthur, and one sister, Mary Lee. Berrey loved her father and after he died when she was 8 years old, Berrey became interested in entering the medical profession and her mother supported Berrey's choice. As a child, two missionaries came to her Baptist church and they discussed how foreign workers were needed, particularly medical doctors which led to Berrey's decision to become a medical missionary. At 14 years old, Berrey attended Judson College in Marion, Alabama. During the next autumn, she attended the University of Alabama's medical program which was a two-year college. While she attended the University of Alabama, a few of her professors were opposed to women working in medicine, but the dean supported her schooling. After she received an AB degree from the University of Alabama, she received a degree in medicine from Tulane University in New Orleans, Louisiana, and was later an intern at Charity Hospital in the same city from 1928 to 1929. Berrey lived in New Orleans with her friend from Judson College, the writer Gwen Bristow. Berrey married Dr. Ivan Berrey on August 27, 1928, in the home of Bristow's parents.

== Early career ==
A group of doctors from Wichita, Kansas, invited Dr. Ivan Berrey to join their clinic, but they were against Dr. Ruth Berrey's desire to practice medicine and they did not want any mention of her having a medical degree. She moved to Birmingham, Alabama, with Ivan and they had a rough life. Ruth said that they had to survive on black-eyed peas, cornbread, and peanut butter. The cornmeal and peanut butter were free from a peanut butter factory that Berrey's brother owned. After a few years of living in Birmingham, the couple moved to Buffalo, New York. Berrey was a pediatrician at the Children's Hospital in Buffalo and she was accepted as a doctor by her patients. Berrey had three children – Anne, Bill and Alice.

From 1940 to 1941, she was the State Medical Supervisor of the National Youth Administration. There was a shortage of teachers during World War II and during this time, Berrey was a biology teacher at Howard College from 1941 to 1945. She worked at four hospitals in Birmingham and was a consultant for the Jefferson County Health Department. Berrey was active within the Alabama Pediatric Society and became a fellow in the American Academy of Pediatrics.

== Later career ==
After her husband died in 1957, Berrey became a volunteer at the Southern Baptist Mission Board and was accepted as a medical missionary. She traveled to a Baptist hospital in Ogbomosho, Nigeria. Berrey, along with a nurse and an aid, worked in villages within a hundred-mile radius. She cared for children, but she also helped reduce the incidence of leprosy in the population with free medication that she administered. Berrey saw over 200 patients each day for 5 days a week.

Traveling to bring medical care to those who could not get to town, Berrey suffered a heart attack during one of these trips. She survived and became a patient at the same mission hospital that she worked at. Berrey moved to Clayton, Alabama, where she became a public health officer in Barbour, Macon, and Bullock Counties. As a public health officer, she conducted clinics for the detection of tuberculosis, cancer, diabetes, sickle cell anemia, and other diseases. After serving in that capacity for six years, she traveled back to Nigeria on July 7, 1972. Many of her former Nigerian patients came to visit her and brought their children along.

== Later years and honors ==
In January 1973, Berrey returned to working as a public health officer in Clayton. On July 23, 1973, she died from a heart attack in Albany, Georgia, while visiting her daughter. She was buried in Clayton County Cemetery.

Berrey was posthumously inducted in the Alabama Women's Hall of Fame in 1976. She had entries in the Who's Who of American Women and Who's Who in Alabama.
