= Maud McKnight Lindsay =

American educator

Maud McKnight Lindsay (1874–1941) was an American educator. She is best known for being the founder of the first free kindergarten in Alabama, and a friend of Helen Keller. In 1995, she was inducted into the Alabama Women's Hall of Fame.

== Biography ==
She was born on May 13, 1874, in Tuscumbia, Alabama, to Robert Burns Lindsay, a politician, and Sarah Miller Lindsay. She was the last of the family's nine children to be born. Maud was homeschooled before entering the Deshler Female Institute. As a child she was friends with Helen Keller.

Lindsay learned from the kindergarten teacher Jeanne Pettit Cooper, and initially taught music at a kindergarten in Tuscumbia. In 1898, she founded, and became a teacher at the first free kindergarten in Alabama.

Lindsay was also an author and poet. She published over 18 children books. The first was Mrs. Speckelty Hen.

She was the third president of the Alabama Writers Conclave, and involved in several other clubs. Lindsay died on May 30, 1941.
