= Florence Golson Bateman =

American soprano, composer and educator (1891–1987)

Florence Golson Bateman (December 4, 1891 – January 20, 1987) was an American soprano, composer and educator. She was inducted into the Alabama Women's Hall of Fame in 2000.

The daughter of Howell Rose Golson, a lawyer, and Alabama "Bama" Goldsmith, she was born Florence Golson in Lowndes County, Alabama. She moved to Wetumpka with her family in 1895. At the age of nine, she had an accident that resulted in her becoming completely blind by the time that she was fifteen. She was educated at the Tennessee School for the Blind and at the Women's College of Alabama in Montgomery. She continued with studies in voice and composition at the Cincinnati Conservatory of Music, graduating in 1920. She moved to New York City, where she studied voice with Walter Golde and orchestration with Frederick Jacobi, also touring over the next three years as a soprano.

In 1923, she married Winton Wadkins Bateman; the couple settled in College Park, Georgia. There, she taught music; her husband worked as a pharmacist and also served as town mayor. They moved to Wetumpka in 1936. Her husband died in 1942.

She pursued further studies at the Cincinnati Conservatory of Music. She also worked with composer Roy Harris. She taught music in Montgomery and Wetumpka until she retired in 1967.

She composed a number of musical pieces, including The Bird with a Broken Wing, dedicated to Helen Keller, and A Spring Symphony, which won several awards. In November 1949, the Alabama Department of Archives and History unveiled a life-size portrait of Bateman in its Music Room. A studio at the Transylvania Music Camp of the Alabama Federation of Music Clubs was named in her honor in 1954.

Bateman died in Wetumpka at the age of 91.
