= Anne Mathilde Bilbro =

American composer and music educator

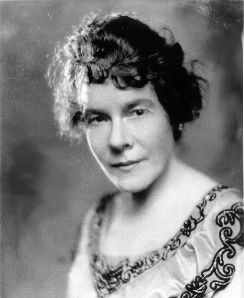

Background information
- Born: January 1870; Tuskegee, Alabama, US
- Died: 2 December 1958 (aged 88) Montgomery, Alabama, US

Anne Mathilde Bilbro was an American composer and music educator.

== Early life and career ==
A native of Tuskegee, Alabama, who spent the lion's share of years 20 through 49 in Gadsden, and the remainder divided primarily between New York, Birmingham, and St. Petersburg, Bilbro was the only daughter of five children born to Francina A. "Franke" (née Mason) and Judge James Andrew Bilbro. She attended the Alabama Conference Female College, graduating in 1887, and later studied music in Atlanta and New York.

Bilbro published over 600 works, primarily in the field of music education. Her compositions included piano pieces, pianologues, song stories, piano duets and trios, and complete collections of piano music. Her teaching methods were recognized for their novelty in the context of children's piano instruction. Bilbro operated a music studio in Gadsden, Alabama, from the 1890s to 1900s, and conducted master classes in multiple states. Beyond her work in music, she wrote short stories, a novel, articles for The Etude, and the "Legend of Noccalula," a text associated with Noccalula Falls in Alabama. In her later years, Bilbro experienced hearing loss but continued to engage with music.

In 1926, The Etude included Bilbro in its sesquicentennial edition celebrating "150 years of American music," alongside other prominent composers of the time.

== Death and legacy ==
On December 2, 1958, Bilbro, whose health had been failing for well over a year, died in Montgomery, Alabama.

In 1983, together with artist Clara Weaver Parrish, Bilbro was named to the Alabama Women's Hall of Fame.
