= Myrtle (given name) =

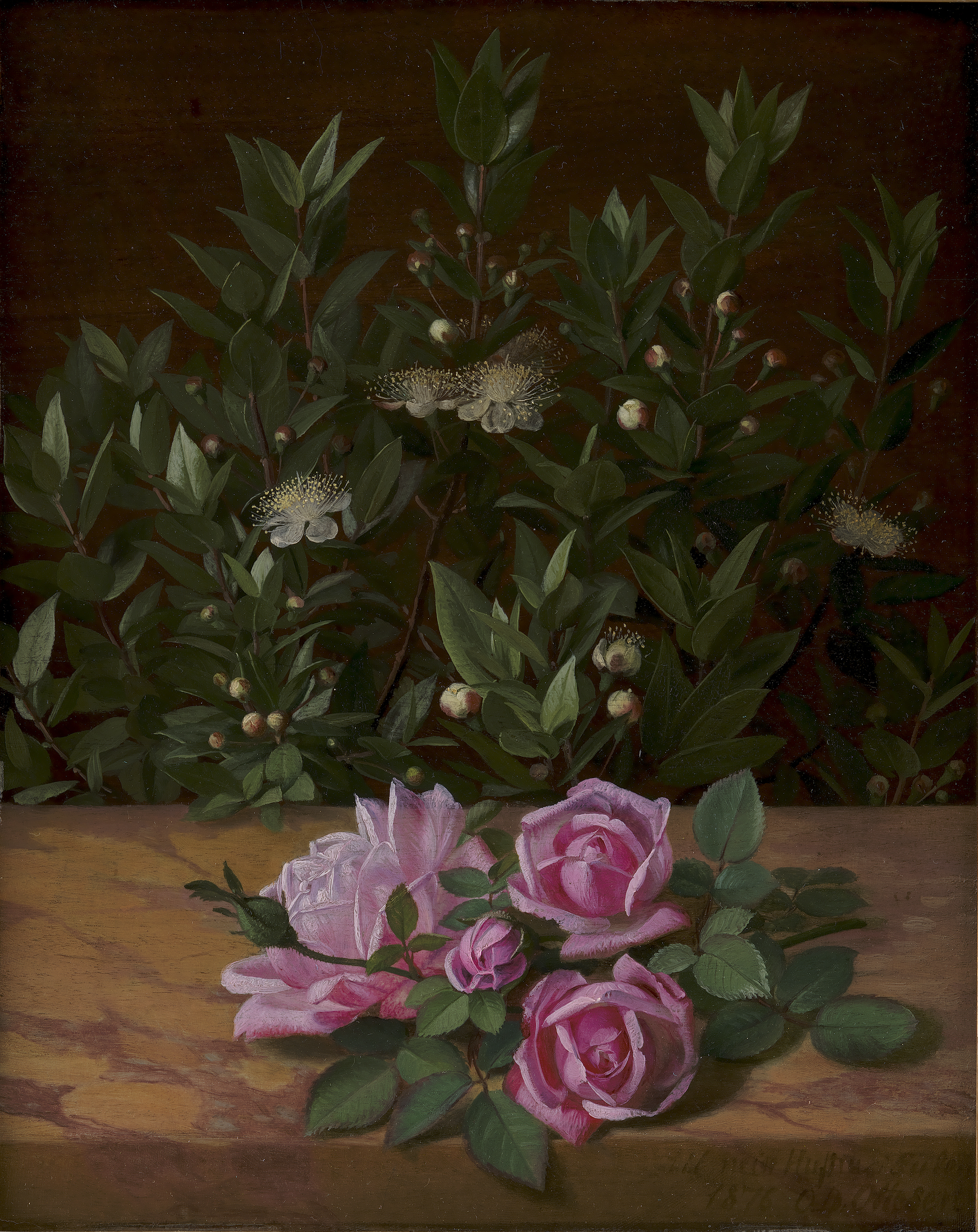
- Roses and Myrtles by O.D. Ottesen.
- Gender: Female
- Language: English

Origin
- Meaning: Myrtle

Myrtle is a feminine given name or nickname derived from the plant name Myrtus; it was popular during the Victorian era, along with other plant and flower names. Myrtle, a symbol of a happy marriage, is often included in a bridal bouquet. Variants include the French-language Myrtille, and Mirtel, a popular name for newborn girls in Estonia during 2012.

Notable people and characters with the name include:

== People ==
- Myrtle Allen (1924–2018), Irish chef
- Myrtle Anderson (1901–1978), Jamaican actress
- Myrtle Augee (born 1965), English shot putter
- Myrtle Aydelotte (1917–2010), American nurse, professor and hospital administrator
- Myrtle Bachelder (1908–1997), American chemist and officer
- Myrtle Baylis (1920–2014), Australian sportswoman
- Myrtle Bothma (born 1964), South African hurdler
- Myrtle Brooke (1872–1948), American professor
- Myrtle Broome (1888–1978), British Egyptologist and artist
- Myrtle Cagle (1925–2019), American pilot and astronaut
- Myrtle Cain (1894–1980), American politician and activist
- Myrtle Cole, American politician
- Myrtle Cook (1902–1985), Canadian track and field athlete
- Myrtle Corbin (1868–1928), American sideshow entertainer
- Myrtle Devenish (1913–2007), Welsh actress
- Myrtle Edwards (sportswoman) (1921–2010), Australian cricketer and softball player
- Myrtle Elvyn (c.1887–1975), American pianist
- Myrtle Fahsbender (1907–2001), American lighting expert
- Myrtle Fillmore (1845–1931), American co-founder of Unity, a church within the New Thought movement
- Myrtille Georges (born 1990), French tennis player
- Myrtille Gollin (born 1984), French speed skater
- Myrtle Gonzalez (1891–1918), American actress
- Myrtle Hazard (1892–1951), American Coast Guard electrician and radio operator
- Myrtle K. Hilo (1929–2009), Native Hawaiian taxicab driver, radio personality, ukulele player and singer
- Myrtle Jones (1913–2005), American painter
- Myrtle Lind (1898–1993), American actress
- Myrtle "Molly" Kool (1916–2009), Canadian sea captain
- Myrtle Maclagan (1911–1993), English cricketer
- Myrtle McAteer (1878–1952), American tennis player
- Myrtle Byram McGraw (1899–1988), American psychologist, neurobiologist, and researcher
- Myrtle Meggy (1887–1959), Australian pianist and pedagogue
- Myrtle Muir (1900–1966), New Zealand netball coach and administrator
- Myrtle Reed (1874–1911), American poet
- Myrtle Robertson, 11th Baroness Wharton (1934–2000), English photographer
- Myrtle Sarrosa, (born 1994), Filipina cosplayer and actress
- Myrtle Sheldon (1893–1939), American illustrator of children's books
- Myrtle Simpson (born around 1930), Scottish skier
- Myrtle Solomon (1921–1987), British pacifist
- Myrtle Stedman (1883–1938), American actress
- Myrtle Tannehill (1886–1977), American actress
- Myrtle Vail (1888–1978), American radio actress and writer
- Myrtle Watkins (1908–1968), American-Mexican dancer, singer, and actress
- Myrtle Whitmore (died 2020), American politician
- Myrtle Witbooi (1947–2023), South African labour activist
- Myrtle Young (1924–2014), American potato chip collector

== Fictional characters ==
- Myrtle, recurring character in the films Diary of a Mad Black Woman and Madea's Family Reunion
- Myrtle, character in the comic strip Right Around Home
- Myrtle Anagnostou, character in the Greek soap opera Erotas
- Myrtle "Tilly" Dunnage, character in the Rosalie Ham novel The Dressmaker and its film adaptation
- Myrtle of Durin, a Vanguard-class operator from the mobile tower defense game Arknights
- Myrtle Fargate, character in the soap opera All My Children
- Myrtle Snow, Antagonist in the third season of the series American Horror Story: Coven
- Miss Myrtle, a lady with blonde hair and wears a purple dress, character from Rocky Hollow
- Moaning Myrtle, or Myrtle Warren (1929–1943), character in the Harry Potter series
- Myrtle Wilson, character in the novel The Great Gatsby by F. Scott Fitzgerald
