= Juliette Hampton Morgan =

American civil rights activist (1914–1957)

- Born: February 21, 1914; Montgomery, Alabama, U.S.
- Died: July 16, 1957 (aged 43); Montgomery, Alabama, U.S.
- Occupation: Librarian
- Known for: Civil Rights activist in Montgomery, Alabama

Juliette Hampton Morgan (February 21, 1914 – July 16, 1957) was a librarian and civil rights activist in Montgomery, Alabama. The only daughter from a well-to-do white family, Morgan was an early member of the community that supported integration. As a librarian, she often spoke out against the acts of injustice she witnessed against African-Americans by writing letters to the Montgomery Advertiser, the local newspaper. She was castigated by the community for her racial views and was targeted by segregationists who broke her windows and burned a cross in her front yard. Unable to bear the strain caused by the unrelenting retaliation, she took her own life.

== Early life and education ==
Juliette Morgan was an only child, born to Frank P. and Lila Bess Olin Morgan of Montgomery, Alabama. Her family was very prominent in the community and were seventh-generation Southerners. Among the friends of the Morgans were Zelda and F. Scott Fitzgerald, and Tallulah Bankhead. Morgan attended Sidney Lanier High School in Montgomery. In 1934 Morgan graduated Phi Beta Kappa from the University of Alabama in Tuscaloosa with a degree in both English literature and political science. She went on to get her master's degree in English the next year.

After graduation, Morgan returned to Montgomery to become a public school teacher at her former high school. In 1942 she became a reference librarian in Montgomery's Carnegie Library where she was eventually promoted to the director of research at the Montgomery Public Library.

== Activism for civil rights and social justice ==
Morgan was active in many associations after she graduated from college. She joined Franklin Roosevelt's New Deal Club, the Southern Conference Educational Fund, and the Alabama Council on Human Relations (of which she was one of the few white members). She often wrote in to the local newspaper, the Montgomery Advertiser, in support of federal anti-lynching laws and to abolish the poll tax.

Morgan's first public statements regarding social justice issues came in 1932 when she spoke out in defense of motherhood and special training for women such as home economics classes, and extended her support for creating a federal department of child welfare. In 1938, she wrote letters in defense of "the Southern Woman", challenging the preconceived notions of the era.

Morgan also became involved in an interracial women's prayer group, the Fellowship of the Concerned. Meetings for the group had to be held in African-American churches; white churches refused to allow the group to use their facilities because integrated meetings violated the city's municipal code. It was during this time that Morgan became more active in civil rights.

Though Morgan could afford a car, she suffered from severe anxiety which prohibited her from driving. Due to this, Morgan took the city buses from her home, where she lived with her mother, to her position with the Montgomery Public Library. She would frequently witness the unjust treatment of the African-American riders by the white bus drivers. One incident in particular made Morgan angry, when she witnessed an African-American woman proceeding with the custom of the time: she paid her fare in the front of the bus, exited the bus, and proceeded to the rear door to get on the back of the bus. On this occasion, however, the bus driver sped away as the woman tried to re-enter. Fed up, Morgan jumped to her feet and pulled the emergency cord, stopping the bus. She yelled at the bus driver and demanded that he let the woman back in the bus. Morgan would continue to repeat this action when necessary for several years.

Morgan's letter writing did come at a price as many members of the white community began to shun her publicly. She was even fired from a bookstore job she had after she had just graduated from college because of a letter she had published in the newspaper.

== Montgomery bus boycott ==
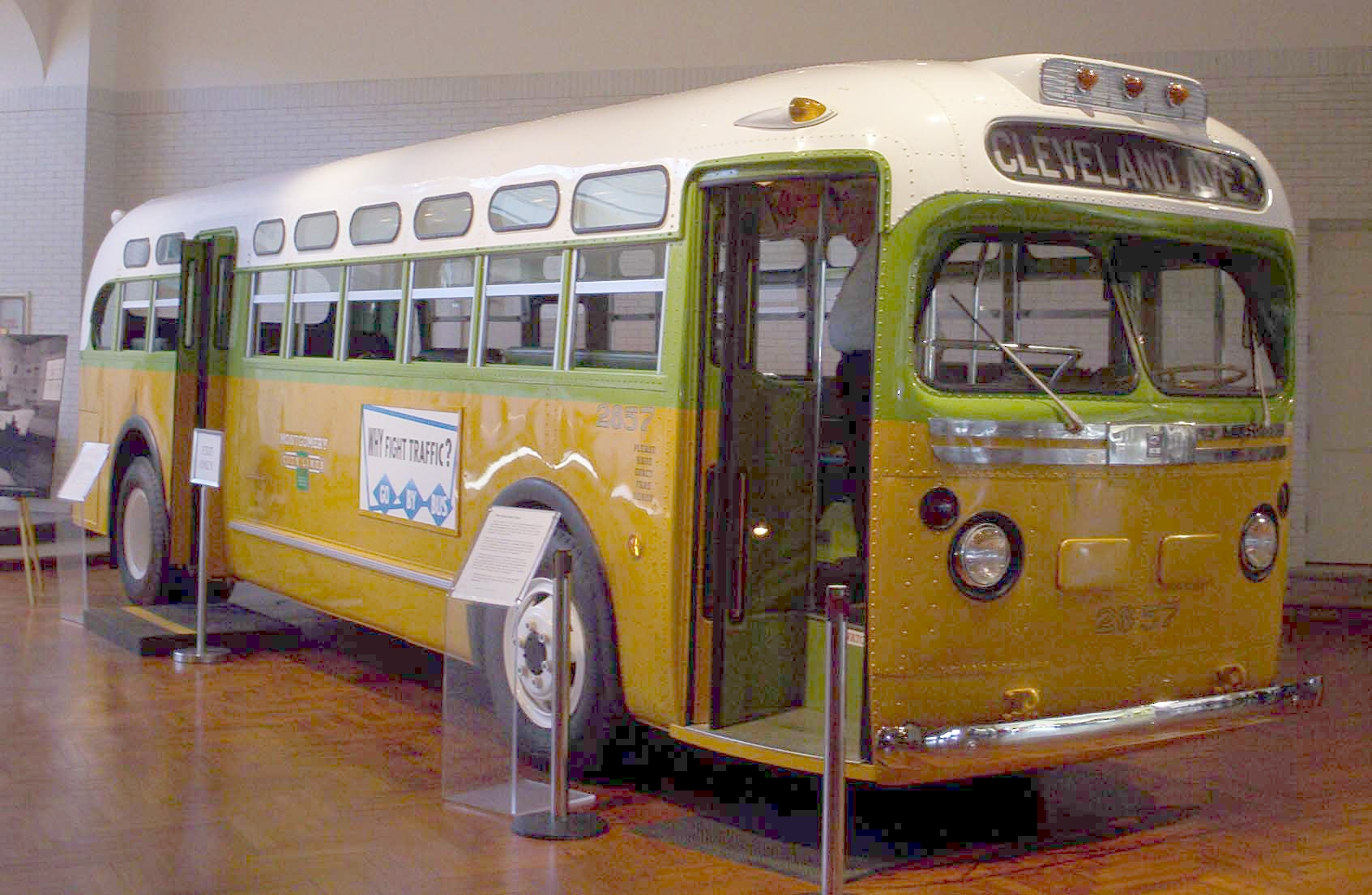
The original bus that Rosa Parks rode on in Montgomery, Alabama

On December 1, 1955, Rosa Parks was arrested after refusing to give up her seat and move to the back of a Montgomery city bus. Eleven days later, on December 12, 1955, Morgan wrote another letter to the editor of the Montgomery Advertiser in support of Ms. Parks and the boycott that followed. She stated in her letter:

The Negroes of Montgomery seem to have taken a lesson from Gandhi... Their own task is greater than Gandhi's however, for they have greater prejudice to overcome. One feels that history is being made in Montgomery these days... It is hard to imagine a soul so dead, a heart so hard, a vision so blinded and provincial as not to be moved with admiration at the quiet dignity, discipline and dedication with which the Negroes have conducted their boycott.

== Continued civil rights advocacy ==
Morgan began to receive hate mail and threatening phone calls in retaliation for expressing her racial views. W. A. Gayle, the Mayor of Montgomery and a member of the segregationist White Citizens' Council, threatened the library council and demanded that they fire Morgan. The library council refused, stating that such a decision would violate her First Amendment rights. Privately, however, library officials asked that Morgan not write any more letters. Many white patrons had destroyed their library cards and boycotted the institution in protest of Morgan's views. Morgan agreed to discontinue her letter writing for the sake of the library, and halted her letters for nearly a year.

Eventually, Morgan could no longer remain silent and resumed her letter writing. In 1956, Morgan wrote to newspapers strongly disapproving of the expulsion of University of Alabama student Autherine Lucy, the first black student to attend the university.

In January, 1957, Buford Boone, editor of the Tuscaloosa News, came to Montgomery. There he spoke out against racial injustice and publicly blamed the White Citizens' Council for the increase in violence seen in the community over the past year. Morgan later wrote a letter of private praise directly to Boone where she stated:

There are so many Southerners from various walks of life that know you are right. [...] They know what they call 'our Southern way of life' must inevitably change. Many of them even are eager for change, but are afraid to express themselves – so afraid to stand alone, to walk out naked as it were. Everyone who speaks as you do, who has the faith to do what he believes right in scorn of the consequences, does great good in preparing the way for a happier and more equitable future for all Americans. You help redeem Alabama's very bad behavior in the eyes of the nation and the world. I had begun to wonder if there were any men in the state – any white men – with any sane evaluation of our situation here in the middle of the Twentieth Century, with any good will, and most especially with any moral courage to express it.

Boone wanted to publish Morgan's letter in the newspaper but she refused, citing her agreement with the library to not publish any more letters. Boone insisted, telling her that publicly stating her views would inspire others. Morgan relented and on January 14, 1957, the Tuscaloosa News printed her letter.

== Retribution and death ==
Soon after the letter was published, Morgan began to receive more hate mail and obscene phone calls. Many of her friends abandoned her and even her own mother lamented at the damage she was supposedly doing to the family name. The public abuse went on for months. During one night in April, a cross was burned in her front yard. Once again, the mayor demanded that the library fire Morgan, but the superintendent and library board remained staunch in their support of Morgan's right to freedom of speech. When funding for the city library was reduced in the amount of Morgan's salary, it became clear that the end of her position was near. Meanwhile, her severe anxiety increased and her health deteriorated significantly.

On July 15, her mother called the library to say that Morgan could no longer work and had decided to resign. On the morning of July 17, 1957, Morgan's mother found her daughter dead; next to her lay an empty bottle of sleeping pills. She had written a suicide letter that said "I am not going to cause any more trouble to anybody." The Montgomery Advertiser reported that she had "died...at her home", without mentioning the suicide; the other local paper, the Alabama Journal, noted she had died "after a short illness".

== Recognition ==
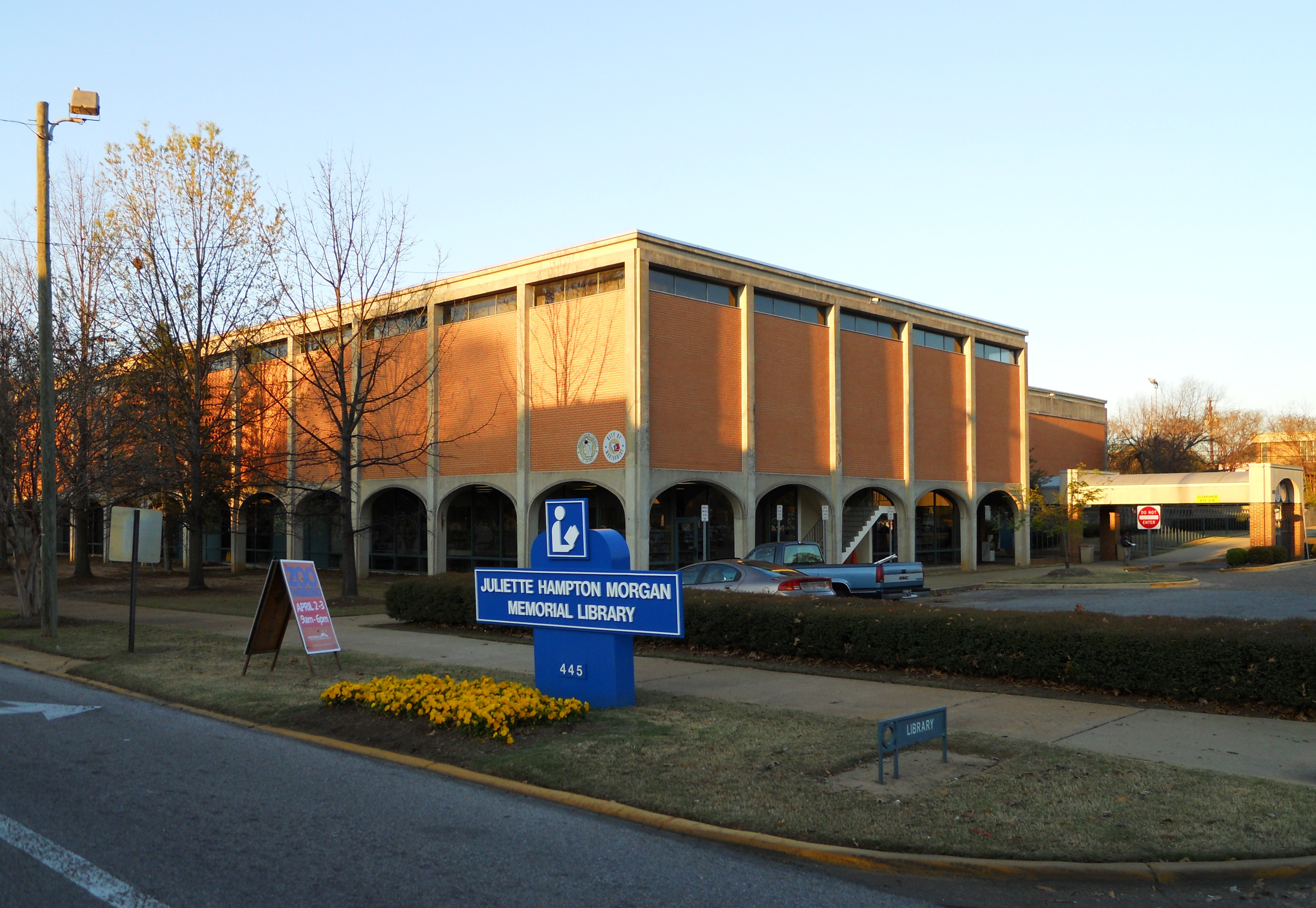
The Juliette Hampton Memorial Library in Montgomery, Alabama.

On the afternoon of July 17, the sanctuary of St. John's Episcopal Church was filled almost to capacity for Morgan's funeral. Because the church was segregated, however, black friends were turned away by the vestryman. The Rev. Martin Luther King Jr. later wrote about Morgan's heroic struggle and the price she paid in his book, Stride Toward Freedom: The Montgomery Story. King wrote:

About a week after the protest started, a white woman who understood and sympathized with the Negroes' efforts wrote a letter to the editor of the Montgomery Advertiser comparing the bus protest with the Gandhian movement in India. Miss Juliette Morgan, sensitive and frail, did not long survive the rejection and condemnation of the white community, but long before she died in the summer of 1957, the name of Mahatma Gandhi was well known in Montgomery.

On March 3, 2005, Juliette Hampton Morgan was inducted into the Alabama Women's Hall of Fame. Later that year, the Montgomery City Council voted to rename the main public library The Juliette Hampton Morgan Memorial Library.
