= Jane Lobman Katz =

American advocate for government reform

Jane Lobman Katz (1931 - 1986) was an Alabama advocate for government reform. She was inducted into the Alabama Women's Hall of Fame in 2000.

== Overview ==
Katz was born in Montgomery in 1931 to Jewish parents. She advocated heavily against 'poor government' in Alabama. She served as the State Legislative Chairperson for the Alabama League of Women Voters, and in that capacity supported education, regulation, standardization, and equalization of property taxes. She was a lifelong advocate for election law reform and campaign finance reform and regulating political action committees. Katz felt there was a need for stronger ethics laws and consumer protection laws. She advocated background checks of providers of childcare. She promoted a constitution reform convention, and the Equal Rights Amendment. Katz created the Capitol Newsletter, a newsletter about legislation. Her Voting Record reported on how Alabama legislators voted on issues pertinent to the League of Women Voters, the first magazine to do so. Katz died in 1986, at age 55.

Katz was described by the Alabama Women's Hall of Fame thus "Her ability to make complex, controversial, sensitive political issues understandable to average people, gave her a prominent place as a watchdog against poor government in Alabama." Former Alabama Chief Justice Howell Heflin, said of Katz, "[she was one of the] truly understanding supporters for the adoption of judicial reform in the Judicial Article.".

== Personal life ==
Jane Lobman married Warren Katz, a WWII veteran and engineer at the Charleston Naval Shipyard. They had three children, one of whom is T.K. Thorne.
