= Majestic Caverns =

- Location within Alabama
- 33.29681°N 86.30639°W
- Location: Childersburg, Alabama

History
- Founded: Prehistoric

Alabama Register of Landmarks and Heritage
- Official name: Majestic Caverns
- Designated: July 19, 1976

Majestic Caverns (formerly known as DeSoto Caverns) is a cave and tourist attraction located in Childersburg, Talladega County, Alabama. Located in the foothills of the Appalachian Mountains, it is touted as "Alabama's Big Cave". Other attractions include a three-quarter acre maze known as the Lost Trail Maze, panning for gemstones, a climbing wall, and amusement park style rides. While on the caverns tour, visitors can view a sound, light, and water show that changes with the holidays and seasons.

Before being commercialized as DeSoto Caverns, the cave was known locally as Kymulga Cave. There is evidence that the cave was formerly used by Native Americans, and it was mined during the Civil War.

In June 2022 the park was renamed "Majestic Caverns."

== Cave structure ==
The main room of the cave is just over ten stories high and larger than a football field. The entrance has been enlarged from an earlier period when it was a 4-foot-high (1.2 m) by 8-foot-wide (2.4 m) hole in the side of a hill.

It was thought at one time that the cave system was very large, extending from near Childersburg to Talladega, Alabama. However, explorations have revealed only one place where the cave continues for any distance beyond the main room. At the left end of the rear wall of the main room, the cave continues some two or three hundred yards, ending at a blank wall and a small pool of water. With the possible exception of an underwater exit through this pool, there are no other known unexplored routes in the cave.

The caverns are noted for one of the largest continuing accumulations of onyx-marble stalagmites and stalactites in the world. DeSoto Caverns has actively growing rock formations (speleothems). For this reason, guests are not permitted to touch most of the rock formations.

== History of the caverns ==
=== Early Native Americans ===
A burial site of the early Native American Copena culture can be seen in DeSoto Caverns. The term 'Copena' comes from the first three letters of copper and the last three letters of Galena, two materials commonly found in these burials. Caves were considered good burial spots by the Copena culture because they offered a peaceful and protective environment for the spirits of the dead.

The burial was discovered in 1963 by a team of archaeologists from the University of Alabama. It contained the skeletons of five Native Americans, one of whom was a child. Of special note was an immense jawbone that scientists believe belonged to a man who would have been more than seven feet tall. In 1995, DeSoto Caverns officials cooperated with a group of Native Americans who wished to rebury the remains of these five people in an undisclosed area of the cave.

=== 16th century ===
The arrival of Spanish explorer Hernando de Soto and his expedition in 1540 marked the beginning of European recorded history in Alabama. At the time of de Soto's arrival, the Muscogee people inhabited Alabama and other parts of the Southeast. In Talladega County, where DeSoto Caverns is located, the Coosa people represented the Muscogee. The Coosa chiefdom—the first in Alabama's recorded history—extended roughly from Gadsden to Wetumpka, on both sides of the Coosa River. Their capital, also called Coosa (meaning "canebrake"), was near what is now Childersburg; and just a few miles to the east was DeSoto Caverns, their ancestral cave.

The de Soto expedition spent a little over five weeks in the Coosa capital. The Coosa Micco (or chief) warmly welcomed de Soto during a ceremony that took place near the entrance of DeSoto Caverns. Despite the Micco's kindness and an offer of land, de Soto took him hostage and took slaves from among the Coosa people.

=== 18th century ===
During George Washington's presidency, Benjamin Hawkins was appointed General Superintendent for Indian Affairs, with responsibility for all Native American tribes south of the Ohio River. In December 1796, he visited the upper Creek Indian territory and in his report to the president described the magnificence of DeSoto Caverns. This report makes DeSoto Caverns the first officially recorded cave in the United States.

=== 19th century ===
Toward the end of the American Civil War, the Confederate Army encouraged families to mine caves for saltpeter, which is used to make gunpowder. The situation became so critical that the Army paid young men to mine saltpeter rather than enlist, with the result that DeSoto Caverns became a saltpeter-mining center. The cave's spring-fed well was an important asset, as the mining of saltpeter involves soil leaching, which requires a lot of water. The well, a leaching trough, and a reconstructed vat used in the saltpeter-mining operations of the Civil War period are on display in the caverns.

=== Early 20th century ===
In 1912, the caverns were purchased by Ida Elizabeth Brandon Mathis—a businesswoman and nationally recognized expert on farm economics—and a number of friends with the idea of mining the cave for its abundant onyx, a semi-precious stone. Unfortunately, Mexican onyx became popular about this time, and the partners could not compete with its lower price. The mine was left dormant for several years after initial mining tests.

During the Prohibition period (1920–1933), when sales of alcohol were prohibited in the United States, an illegal speakeasy and dance hall was opened in the cavern. Because of frequent shootings and fights, the caverns became known in the early 1920s as "The Bloody Bucket," and the establishment was eventually closed down by federal agents.

In the mid 1920s, Ida Mathis's son Allen bought out the other mining partners' interest in the caverns and secured all underground rights to the property and surrounding areas. Throughout its first half-century, the cave was a popular place of exploration for young romantics and teenage spelunkers. In the early 1960s, Mathis, along with Mr. Fred Layton, began to develop the caverns into a show cave, and high-powered electric lights were installed to show off the caverns' colorful onyx. The attraction was initially opened to the public under the name KyMulga Onyx Cave around 1960.

=== Late 20th century ===
Allen Mathis' son and grandson—Allen W. Mathis, Jr., and Allen Mathis, III—took over the caverns' operation in 1975. The following year the caverns were renamed DeSoto Caverns in honor of Hernando de Soto. New lighting was installed, pathways were widened, and improvements were added to allow larger groups of visitors. Back areas of the cave never before accessible to visitors were opened in 1980. The 1980s also saw the development of a light, sound, and water show and the addition of a playground, a gift shop, and a cantina. Camping facilities were enlarged and updated. In the 1990s, the climbing wall and gemstone panning features were added.

DeSoto Caverns was added to the Alabama Register of Landmarks and Heritage on July 19, 1976.

=== Name change ===
In June 2022 the park was renamed Majestic Caverns.
