= Doris Marie Bender =

Doris Marie Bender (November 29, 1911 – November 15, 1991) was an Alabama social worker. Her programs to help the elderly and disabled adults, developed in Mobile County, became models for later state-wide efforts to protect these groups of people. Bender was inducted into the Alabama Women's Hall of Fame in 1994.

== Biography ==
Bender was the oldest of four children and born in Mobile, Alabama to Mary Frances McCafferty Bender and Theodore Jackson Bender. She helped raise her younger siblings after the death of her mother. Bender earned an undergraduate degree at the University of Alabama and did graduate work in the field of social work at Tulane University and the University of Chicago.

Bender began work with the Mobile County Relief Administration in 1933. Bender took over as director of public welfare for Mobile County in 1943. She would work as the director there until she retired in 1976. She helped found — and later served on the board of — the Alabama Office of Volunteerism. Bender's innovations as a social worker in Alabama included the creation of an adult foster care program for elderly and disabled victims of abuse and neglect and in-home care for the elderly. Both of these programs were used to develop state-wide efforts for adult foster care and in-home care.

Bender was a vocal advocate for racial and gender equality. She hired the first black social worker in Alabama, Rosemary Butler, in 1946. She broke down gender barriers, becoming the first woman to be elected to the Board of Directors of First Southern Federal Savings and Loan Association, the first woman to serve on the Board of Trustees of Spring Hill College, and Miss the first woman selected from outside the University of South Alabama staff to serve on the Admissions Committee of the USA School of Medicine.

Bender was inducted into the Alabama Women's Hall of Fame in 1994. In 2007, she was inducted into the Alabama Social Work Hall of Fame.
