= Ida Elizabeth Brandon Mathis =

American farmer and businesswoman (1857–1925)

- Born: Ida Elizabeth Brandon; September 16, 1857; Florence, Alabama
- Died: October 19, 1925 (aged 68); Gadsden, Alabama
- Other name: Mrs. G.H. Mathis
- Occupations: farmer, businesswoman, agricultural reformer
- Spouse: Giles Huffman Mathis

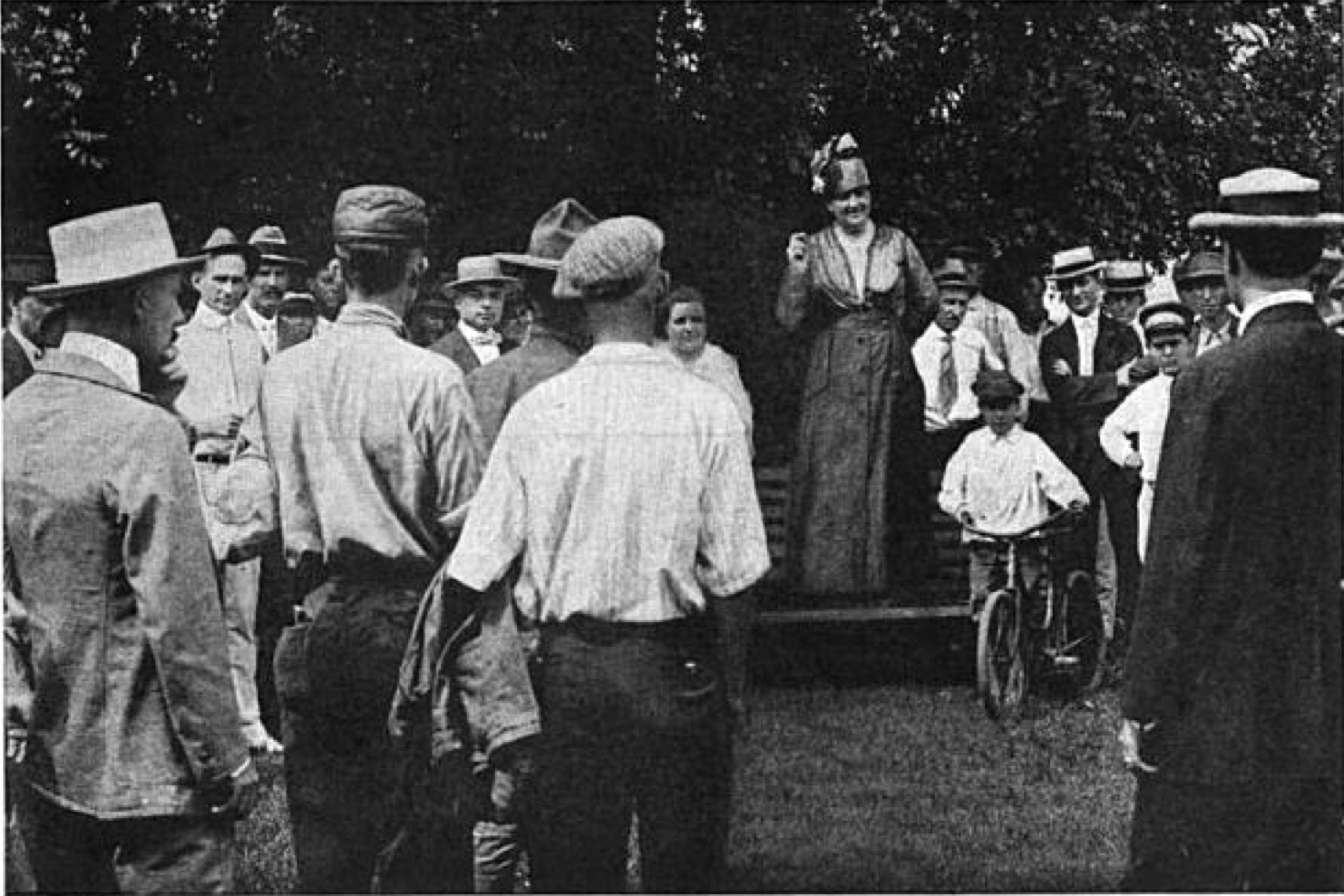
Farmers' advocate Ida Elizabeth Brandon Mathis speaking to a group of farmers ca. 1917

Ida Elizabeth Brandon Mathis (1857–1925) was an American farmer and businesswoman who advocated for methods that would improve conditions for Southern farmers, including crop diversification and rotation and better methods of financing for small farmers. She is credited with reducing agricultural poverty in Alabama and diminishing the state's dependence on imported food.

== Early life and education ==
Ida Elizabeth Brandon was born in Florence, Alabama, on September 16, 1857, to Mary Baldwin (Munn) Brandon and Washington McClure Brandon. Her father was a farmer, and she became not only a successful farmer herself but also a businesswoman and national farmers' advocate. She was educated at the local Florence Synodical Female College, where she earned her B.A. in 1874 (with honors) followed by her M.A.

For several years thereafter, she taught natural science and other subjects at a college in Oxford, Alabama.

In 1882, she married Giles Huffman Mathis, a merchant and cotton buyer with whom she had three children.

== Farming and advocacy career ==
Mathis ran her own farm and bought and sold others, becoming one of the largest landowners in the state and gaining the practical experience that fed her later advocacy career. In the early 1900s, she bought over 1,000 acres of poor land in eastern Alabama hill country at $8 an acre and, working with her tenants, built it up into productive farmland. She then sold the land for $40 an acre and repeated the cycle several more times, continuing to focus on buying poor or run-down land, improving it, and selling it. Most frequently, she sold the improved land to her own tenants—both white and black—thus helping to widen the state's base of landowners.

A crucial part of her success was her move away from the one-crop (cotton) system that dominated Alabama at the time, which was destructive to the soil and economically risky for farmers. Mathis developed a plan for her farms under which the farm's basic expenses had to be met from a spectrum of crops and livestock apart from cotton, with cotton planted only to bring in extra cash, not as the mainstay of the farm's existence. She emphasized crop rotation with winter crops like clover and vetch to renew the soil. In the contracts she wrote with her tenants, the year's farming responsibilities were laid out in weekly detail to ensure that they followed her plan. She also worked with bankers, successfully persuading them to lend to farmers on more reasonable terms.

Mathis's own efforts, together with those of farmers imitating her practices, are said to have helped raise thousands of Alabama farmers from poverty and bring the state's annual expense for imported foodstuff down from $106 million to $81 million. She is also credited with helping to greatly reduce the ravages of the cattle tick in the state by leading the organization of a massive cattle-dipping campaign.

During the latter part of World War I (1915–1917), Southern cotton farmers suffered through a severe economic depression caused largely by a combination of bad boll weevil infestations and the loss of their prewar European markets. Mathis was appointed by two successive Alabama governors, Charles Henderson and Thomas Kilby, to talk about her methods to Alabama farmers and to represent the state's farmers' situation and needs at national agricultural and economic development conferences. A charismatic speaker, she traveled all around her home state talking to farmers and lectured on her major theme—safety in food crops—across the entire country, speaking at such gatherings as the Farm Mortgage Bankers Association of America (FMBA) in St. Louis (1915) and the Banker's Farmer Conference in Chicago (1917). Her FMBA speech was so well received that a copy was sent to President Woodrow Wilson together with a resolution expressing the FMBA's appreciation for her efforts to improve conditions for Southern farmers.

The flavor of Mathis's vigorous and direct style is evident in this excerpt from an informal interview she gave to a contemporary magazine: "We Alabama folks can do more fool stunts to the square inch than any people in America! We work ourselves to death to keep from growing hay. We kill the grass to grow the cotton to buy the grass—and thus we ride round Poverty Post on a merry-go-round. To think of our buying corn, when right here in Alabama we have set the world's record for growing corn—232 1/2 bushels to the acre! Why, if you folks don't wake up, you'll sleep yourselves to death."

As Mathis's national reputation grew, she was increasingly asked to consult with government officials and Wall Street financiers. In 1917, for example, she consulted with Treasury Secretary William Gibbs McAdoo, and around the same time the Comptroller of the Currency, John Skelton Williams, told her that with her idea for an improved financing (credit) system for farmers, she had "done more toward winning the [First World] War than any other person in the United States". She extended her advocacy efforts by writing on farming-related economic issues in the general press and in agricultural and finance journals.

Mathis championed a drive to site a nitrate plant in Muscle Shoals, Alabama, and was the sole woman on the committee of one hundred citizens that spearheaded that effort. In 1916, she was an invited speaker at the first-ever meeting of the Alabama Chamber of Commerce.

For her work, Mathis was referred to as the "leader of Alabama's agricultural Renaissance" and the "economic Moses of the South," and one writer estimated in 1917 that her efforts had been worth $20 million to her home state.

== Cave mining ==
Kymulga Cave near Childersburg, Alabama, was used for mining saltpeter during the Civil War. In 1912, Mathis and a consortium of friends bought the cave with the idea of mining its abundant onyx. They quickly discovered that they could not compete with much cheaper Mexican onyx, and Mathis bought out all the shares in order to keep the cave and surrounding land in her family. Her son Allen would later turn the cave into a tourist attraction called DeSoto Caverns.

Mathis died October 19, 1925.

== Legacy ==
In 1993, Mathis was inducted into the Alabama Women's Hall of Fame.
