= Alice Finch Lee =

American lawyer and church leader (1911–2014)

- Born: September 11, 1911; Bonifay, Florida, U.S.
- Died: November 17, 2014 (aged 103)
- Education: Birmingham School of Law
- Known for: Law, lay leadership in United Methodist Church, and being sister of Harper Lee
- Relatives: Harper Lee (sister)

Alice Finch Lee (September 11, 1911 – November 17, 2014) was an American lawyer and lay leader in the United Methodist Church. One of the first female lawyers in Alabama, she was the sister of author Harper Lee and helped her manage publicity requests. Due to her life's work and sister, she was described as "Atticus Finch in a skirt."

== Biography ==
Alice Finch Lee was born on September 11, 1911, in Bonifay, Florida to Amasa and Frances Finch Lee. She was the eldest of the Lee children. Her sister, Nelle Harper Lee, was fifteen years her junior. Lee attended Monroe County High School, graduating at sixteen. She attended Huntingdon College between 1928 and 1929, returning after a year due to the Great Depression and her father's purchase of a local newspaper. She worked for the paper, The Monroe Journal, until 1937, when she moved to Birmingham to work for the Social Security division of the Internal Revenue Service. Two years later, she enrolled in the Birmingham School of Law.

Lee passed the bar in 1943, becoming one of Alabama's first female lawyers. The next year, she returned to Monroeville, where she joined her father's law firm in general practice. She also served on the board of directors and as attorney for the Monroe County Bank.

Lee continued to make strides in the local public and religious fields. She was the first woman to serve on the Monroeville City Planning Commission, the first woman to chair the West Florida Council on Ministries in the Methodist Church, the first woman to chair the board of directors of the United Methodist Children's Home, and a charter member of the Alabama/West Florida United Methodist Foundation board of directors. In the mid-1960s, she became the "hero of the conference" at an annual Alabama West-Florida Annual Conference meeting, when she used a parliamentary maneuver to prevent efforts to block a report recognizing the present racial divisions.

Lee was also active regionally and nationally in the United Methodist Church. She became the secretary of the Episcopacy Committee for the Southeastern Jurisdiction, serving for eight years. She was on the General Council on Ministries for eight years as well and served on the executive committee. In 1976 and 1980, she was a delegate to the General Conference, where she became the first woman to serve as head of the delegation. At the time of her death, she was still the only woman to have led the Alabama-West Florida Conference delegation. She was one of the few women on the Tri-Conference Committee on Merger, which combined two mostly white and one black denomination into the current organization. As issues concerning racism continued and black clergy were not always paid the same as their white counterparts, she raised funds to make up for the differences in salary.

Alice Lee was the point person for the To Kill a Mockingbird brand until her retirement. When Harper Lee left the public eye, Alice took on the role of rejecting publicity requests on her behalf.

Lee retired at 100, making her the oldest practicing lawyer in the state. Lee died on 17 November 2014.

== Awards ==
- 1984: honorary Doctorate of Laws, Huntingdon College
- 1987: Citizen of the Year, Monroeville Kiwanis Club
- 1992: the Alabama-West Florida Conference of the United Methodist Church established the Alice Lee Award
- 2003: Maud McClure Kelly Award, Alabama Bar Association
- 2004: Special honor, Alabama Bar Association
- 2012: Alabama Academy of Honor
- 2023: Alabama Women's Hall of Fame
