= Edwina Donnelly Mitchell =

American prison superintendent (1894–1968)

Superintendent (warden) of Julia Tutwiler Prison for Women
- In office 1951–1966

Alabama Pardons and Parole Board
- In office 1939–1949

Assistant Attorney General
- In office 1939–1939

Assistant Attorney General
- In office 1922–1925

Personal details
- Born: 1894 Autauga County, Alabama, United States
- Died: February 4, 1968 (aged 73–74) Alabama, United States
- Education: University of Montevallo; Vanderbilt University Law School

Edwina Donnelly Mitchell (1894–1968) was the Superintendent (warden) of Julia Tutwiler Prison for Women located in Wetumpka, Alabama.

== Background ==
Originally from Autauga County, Alabama, she was a graduate of Alabama College (now University of Montevallo) and a 1946 graduate of Vanderbilt University Law School.

Alabama attorney general Harwell Goodwin Davis appointed Mitchell as Assistant Attorney General of Alabama 1922–25. She held the position again in 1939, when she wrote the legislation to create the Alabama Pardons and Parole Board. She was the first woman to serve on the board, 1939–1949.

== Tutwiler ==
In 1951, she was appointed Superintendent of Tutwiler. She believed harsh conditions and strict measures only hardened people whose lives had led them to prison, telling an interviewer, "The attorney general used to ask me to sit in on meetings for him when I was an assistant. I went out to see the institutions we were putting people in, and I was so upset I've never lost interest in the correctional field." Instead, she housed the women in shared cells, where they were allowed some personal items in their area. Spurred by proposed state legislation to revamp the prison system, based on allegations it was a financial liability by not being self-supporting, women's clubs toured Tutwiller to observe the situation for themselves. The visitors found prisoners growing their own food, and learning the textile trade. Mitchell explained her philosophy of teaching the prisoners how to get past their own hostilities, "I believe everybody can be improved with the right kind of self discipline."

== Final years and death ==
After reaching retirement age for a state job, Mitchell was given a waiver to continue overseeing Tutwiler. Her personal physician urged her to retire when she reached the age of 70. Although the announcement was made in January 1965, no date was set. She was hospitalized with a heart attack in January 1966, and she officially retired July 16.

Mitchell died February 4, 1968. She was elected to the Alabama Women's Hall of Fame in 1973.
