= Maria Fearing =

American teacher and missionary

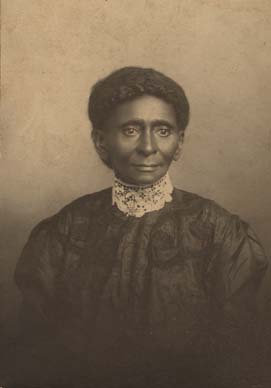
Maria Fearing during the 1880s

Maria Fearing (July 26, 1838 – May 23, 1937) was an American teacher and missionary, most famous for her work in the Congo Free State.

== Life ==
Maria Fearing was born in slavery near Gainesville, Alabama in 1838, to Mary and Jesse, on the Oak Hill plantation of William O. Winston, in whose home she worked as a nanny and house slave for 30 years. After the end of slavery in the United States, she learned to read and write at the age of 33. She went on to graduate from the Freedman's Bureau School in Talladega and qualified as a teacher, and worked in Anniston.

In spite of her old age of 56, she accompanied William Henry Sheppard to Africa in 1894 as a Presbyterian missionary. Rejected by the church because of her age, she initially financed her mission primarily through funds from the sale of her home. For twenty years, she worked in the Congo Free State as a teacher and Bible translator. She also bought many people out of slavery in the Congo. Her most famous achievement was the establishment of the Pantops Home for Girls in Luebo, Congo. She was known as mama wa Mputu, which means "Mother from far away". Despite the church's skepticism, Fearing outlasted many of her colleagues in Africa and only retired from missionary service in 1915 due to age restrictions. She taught Sunday school in Selma, Alabama, until she was 93; she then lived in Sumter County until her death in 1937 at the age of 98.

== Legacy ==
After her death, her fame was spread to many Alabama schoolchildren, both white and black, through the inclusion of her life story in Alabama history textbooks during the turbulent days of the 1960s. She was inducted into the Alabama Women's Hall of Fame in 2000.
