= Chamintney Stovall Thomas =

American writer, educator and religious leader (1899–1979)

- Born: 1899; St. Clair County, Alabama
- Died: 1979 (aged 79–80); Russellville, Alabama
- Occupations: Writer, educator
- Spouse: Ralph Cage Thomas
- Writing career
- Language: English
- Notable work: Hear the Lambs A-Cryin'

Chamintney "Mittie" Stovall Thomas (1899–1979) was an educator, musician, author, and religious leader in Russellville, Alabama. Her most well-known work is Hear the Lambs A-Cryin, a historical novel about the southern black community during the Great Depression. In 1986, she was elected to the Alabama Women's Hall of Fame.

Thomas was born in 1899 in the small town of Steele in St. Clair County, Alabama. She married Ralph Cage Thomas, superintendent of schools in Russell County, and spent much of the Great Depression volunteering in black classrooms, teaching music and assisting with general topics.

Thomas' historical novel, Hear the Lambs A-Cryin, was published in 1975. It is inspired by her experiences volunteering in the black community during the Great Depression. A book review in a 1975 edition of the Library Journal praised Thomas' "authentic ear for dialect" in the book, which brought to life "the lore, the mores, the deep family attachments, and the inherent strength of her protagonists."

As a member of the First Baptist Church of Russellville, Thomas also volunteered in disadvantaged communities and helped establish several churches. She also wrote several volumes of children's stories and Bible stories.
