= Rosa Gerhardt =

American lawyer

- Born: March 29, 1898
- Died: January 5, 1975 (aged 76)
- Education: Cumberland School of Law
- Occupation: Attorney

Rosa Gerhardt (March 29, 1898 – January 5, 1975) was an American attorney from Mobile, Alabama, where she served as president of the Mobile Bar Association, the first woman in Alabama to hold the position at a local or state bar association.

== Early life ==
Gerhardt was born on March 29, 1898, in Camden, Alabama, the fourth of nine children of Marcus and Esther Gerhardt. The family moved to Mobile in 1914. Rosa graduated from Mobile High School the same year.

== Career ==
Gerhardt taught at Dauphin Island Elementary School before moving to Washington, D.C., where she worked during World War I, before moving back to Mobile to work as a legal assistant to Gregory L. Smith. After working for Smith for nine years, after he died, she enrolled at Cumberland University's law school in Lebanon, Tennessee, and graduated with honors in June 1930. She passed the Alabama Bar Examination, becoming the second female attorney in Mobile.

In 1933, Gerhardt was a delegate to the Alabama convention to ratify the Twenty-first Amendment to the United States Constitution. She also was a member of the Mobile Business and Professional Women's Club, and served as club president in 1941.
