= Anne Mae Beddow =

- Born: 1893
- Died: 1974 (aged 80–81)
- Education: St. Vincent School of Nursing; Lakeside School of Anesthesia
- Known for: Nurse anesthetist

Anne Mae Beddow (1893 – 1974) was a nurse anesthetist. She was instrumental in the development and spread of intravenous anesthesia.

== Early life and military career ==
Beddow was born in 1893. She attended the St. Vincent School of Nursing in Birmingham, Alabama. She then attended Lakeside School of Anesthesia in Cleveland, Ohio.

In May 1918, Beddow enlisted in the first unit of the United States Army Nurse Corps as a Lieutenant. She travelled to Italy with the Loyola Unit, and served with Base Hospital 102 in Vicenza, Italy. Her contributions during the war led to her earning medals from the American and Italian governments.

== Later career ==
Although some accounts claim that Beddow developed the technique for administering pentothal sodium intravenously while on the Italian front during the 1918 Vittorio Veneto offensive, this seems unlikely given that sodium thiopental was only discovered in the 1930s, and first used in humans in 1934. Other accounts argue that she was one of the first nurses to use it in 1930s.

Beddow went on to be elected president of the President of Alabama Nurses Association (1926), and was the first president of the Alabama Association of Nurse Anesthetists. She was also a charter member of the American Association of Nurse Anesthetists, which she was the Treasurer/Director for.

== Death ==
Beddow died on July 7, 1974.

== Awards ==
- 1973: 40-year service pin, American Red Cross
- 1973: Professional Boards Leadership, Unselfish Community Service, Exemplification of Altrusan Principles, Altrusa International, Inc
- 2016: Alabama Women's Hall of Fame
- 2017: Distinguished Service Award, Alabama Association of Nurse Anesthetists
