= Hallie Farmer =

American professor and activist (1881–1960)

Dr. Hallie Farmer (1881–1960) was an American college professor, political activist, and historian. Farmer was also heavily involved in the women's political rights movement and frequently wrote letters to her representatives in Alabama if she was unpleased by public affairs. Farmer also advocated for prison reform and against voting discrimination. Farmer's educational background is extensive. She served as the head of the political science and history department at Alabama College for Women (now the University of Montevallo) during the period of 1927-49 and from 1949-1956, as the Dean of the Social Sciences Department.

== Education ==
Farmer attended Terre Haute Normal School (now Indiana State University) for a B.S. and graduated in 1917. She later attended University of Wisconsin earning a M.A. in 1922 and a Ph.D. in 1927.

== Career ==
Before she moved to Alabama, Farmer taught at public schools in Muncie and Crawfordsville, Indiana, and at Ball State University Teachers College from 1917-1927. After moving to Alabama, Farmer served as the head of the history department at Alabama State College for Women from 1927-1949 and the Dean of the Social Science Division from 1949-1956. Alabama State College for Women, now the University of Montevallo, holds annual lectures for social sciences dubbed the “Hallie Farmer Lecture Series” and has scholarships in her name.

As a scholar, her focus was Alabama government and politics. A journal article about Farmer describes her focus as "applied politics". Farmer wrote articles for many influential Southern journals such as the South Atlantic Quarterly, The Mississippi Valley Historical Review, and the Alabama Review (of which she was a founding member). Farmer's two main goals were to improve government and to empower women. Farmer later authored a book called The Legislative Process in Alabama published in 1949.

== Political activism ==
During her tenure at Alabama State College for Women, Farmer encouraged her students to become active in politics and interested in government. Some of the political causes that Farmer was active in was prison reform, legislative reform, women's rights, improved education, and civil rights.
