= Myrtle Brooke =

Mary Myrtle Brooke
- Born: 1872; Canton, Georgia
- Died: January 30, 1948 (aged 75–76)
- Occupation: Professor

Mary Myrtle Brooke (1872 - January 30, 1948) is an American professor who was inducted into the Alabama Women's Hall of Fame for beginning the social work curriculum in the state. Her program was the first in Alabama and one of the first in the United States. Brooke was involved in the Alabama Department of Education, worked for the Red Cross and developed a scholarship at the University of Montevallo.

== Biography ==
Brooke was born in 1872 in Canton, Georgia. In 1908 she began working at the University of Montevallo (then called Alabama Girls' Technical Institute and later, Alabama College) as the chairman of the Department of Psychology and Education. She taught to first course in sociology in Alabama in 1912. In 1919, Brooke spent a year working for the Red Cross and then came back to work for the Department in 1920. In 1924, she organized a sociology department and started summer training classes in social work, using experts from the University of Chicago and Simmons College of Kentucky. Her program for social work was the first of its kind in the state. It was also one of the first of its kind in the country. Brooke also developed a scholarship for students at the school. In 1925, she began the first two-year undergraduate social work curriculum in the state. Under her leadership the University became the training center for social work in Alabama as primary site for social work conferences, institutes, and courses of intensified study. Brooke also served on the Alabama Society for Mental Hygiene, as its President.

Brooke was awarded a Doctor of Laws by Alabama College in 1936. She was inducted into the Alabama Women's Hall of Fame in 1979.

Brooke died on January 30, 1948.
