= Cater Hall =

Historic house in Alabama, United States

- Cater Hall (Old President's Mansion)
- U.S. National Register of Historic Places
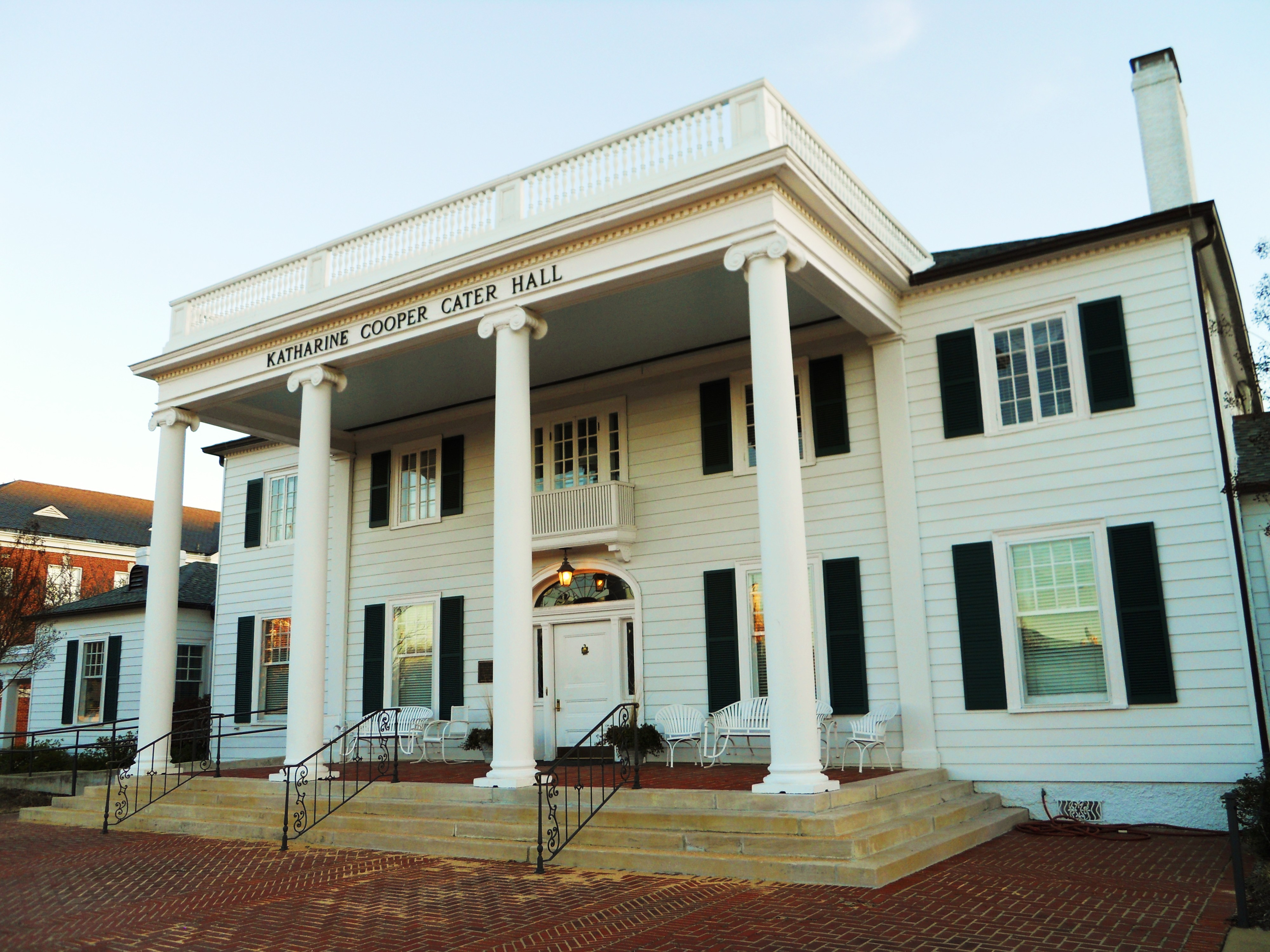
- Katharine Cooper Cater Hall at Auburn University

- Location within Alabama Location within the United States
- Location: 277 W. Thatch Ave., Auburn, Alabama
- Coordinates: 32°36′12″N 85°29′5″W
- Built: 1915
- Architect: Hudnut, Joseph
- Architectural style: Classical Revival
- NRHP reference No.: 03000423
- Added to NRHP: August 29, 2003

Katharine Cooper Cater Hall, also known as the Old President's Mansion or the Social Center, is a structure on the National Register of Historic Places on the campus of Auburn University, in Auburn, Alabama. Designed by Joseph Hudnut and built for $17,000, Cater Hall was constructed in 1915 as the residence for the president of Auburn University (formerly Alabama Polytechnic Institute). In 1938, Auburn University built a new president's home, and Cater Hall became the social center for the new Quad dorms when they were built to the south of the mansion in 1940.

At this time, the Social Center also housed the Dean of Women. The goal of the Dean of Women's office was to teach female students how to “develop to their fullest potentialities, intellectually, socially, emotionally, physically, culturally and morally," and prepare them for their womanly roles in the home and community. In the late 1970s, the building was renovated to contain administrative offices and today houses the Auburn University's Honors College. Presently, Cater Hall is home to the honors college and still hosts student organization “callouts” on the steps.

== Dean Katharine Cooper Cater ==
Dean Katharine Cooper Cater was named Dean of Women and Social Director in 1946 and worked at Auburn University for 34 years. During Cater’s time at Auburn, she fought for equal treatment and promoted the education of female students. She encouraged young women to be active members of society and achieve more than was socially accepted at the time. Dean Cater also established many organizations available to women to help them develop leadership skills. This included bringing many new sorority chapters to campus and instituting women's honor societies (Alpha Lambda Delta, Owens, and Mortar board).

In The Alabama Women's Hall of Fame, there is an excerpt from Morris Savage, an Auburn Trustee, where he describes Dean Cater, "Buildings are named for persons whose lives exemplify the purpose of the building, and Katharine Cater's love and compassion for individuals, her nourishment and support of women, her gaiety and wit permeate every room here. But Katharine Cater's influence extends far beyond these walls to enrich the lives of all who know her. Many of us here rely on her insight and judgment . . . drink from her wisdom . . . take comfort from her smile and courage from her philosophy."

In the late 70s, Cater Hall was renovated to house administrative offices and University departments. On April 25, 1980, the Social Center was renamed Katharine Cooper Cater Hall to recognize Dean Cater’s contributions to the women’s movement.

== Women's rights ==
In 1970, a female student was denied access to the Social Center because she was wearing pants. The male faculty member claimed her attire violated the school handbook’s rule of Auburn women acting as a lady at all times. As the civil rights and feminist movements had begun to emerge a few years earlier, female students at Auburn University took action.

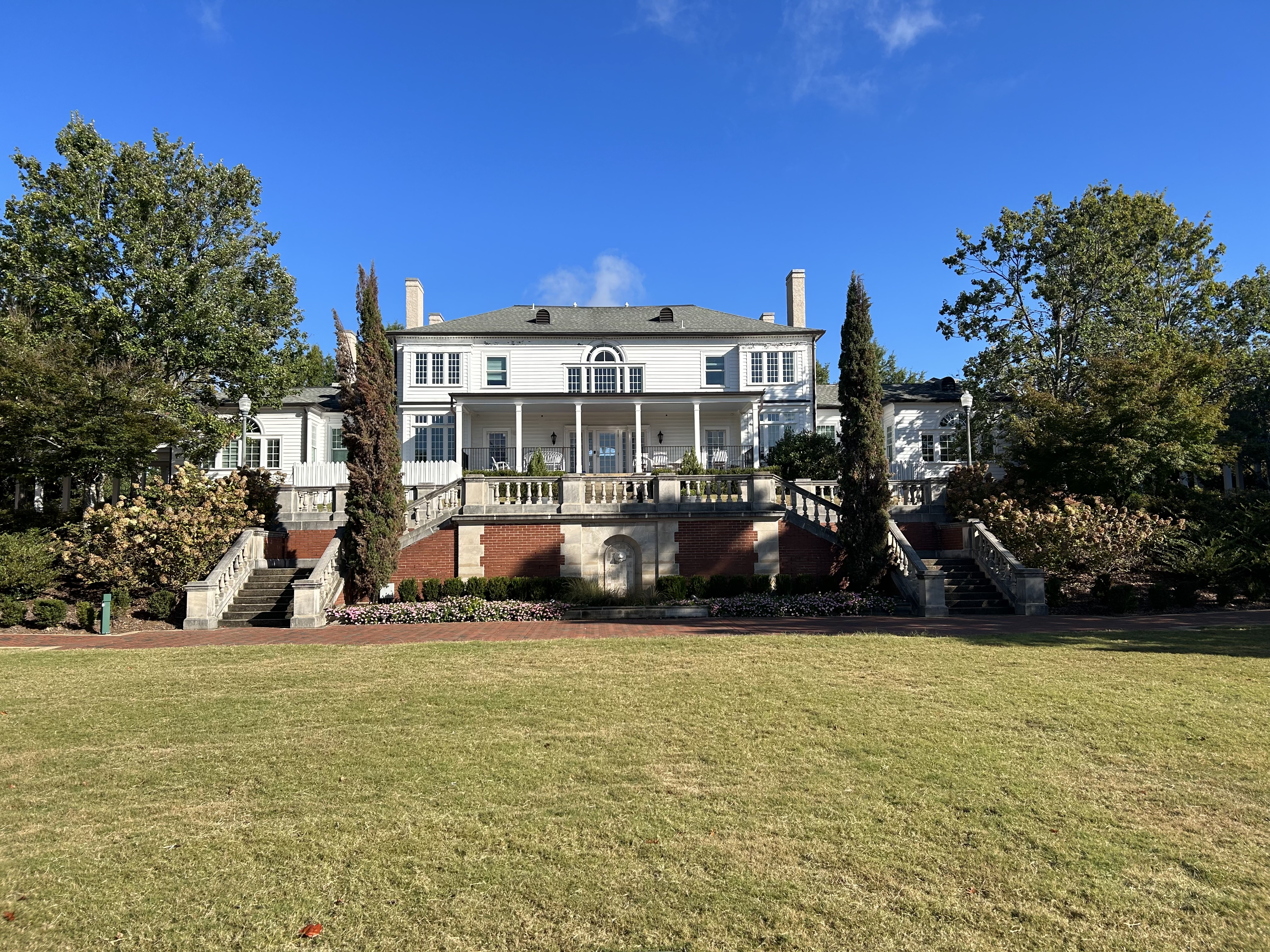
A back view of Katharine Cooper Cater Hall.

On May 20, 1971, a sleep-in on the Social Center lawn was organized by the Associated Women Students and Student Government Association in an effort to promote women’s equality. It took a year from that protest for female students to gain equal treatment at the University with the implementation of Title IX in 1972.

After the implementation of Title IX, the campus was reorganized to create equality between women and men, including allowing men to live in the Quad dormitories. The Dean of Women’s office in Cater Hall was removed after the creation of Title IX. Dean Cater’s title also switched from Dean of Women to Dean of Student Life as Auburn University consolidated male and female students on campus.
