= Blanche Evans Dean =

Naturalist, conservationist and author (1892–1974)

Blanche Evans Dean (June 12, 1892 – May 31, 1974) was an American naturalist, conservationist and schoolteacher.

== Early life and education ==
Dean was born Viola Blanche Evans in 1892 to John James and Catherine Evans, the youngest of their twelve children. She was raised on her parents' farm in Clay County, Alabama, where she first developed an interest in wildlife. She attended Lineville High School and, after graduating in 1908, began teaching at Hatchett Creek Presbyterian Church.

After deciding to become a teacher, Dean studied education at Jacksonville State University and later at Valparaiso University. In 1924, following her graduation from the University of Alabama with a degree in chemistry, she became a biology teacher at Woodlawn High School in Birmingham, Alabama. She remained there until 1957, spending a total of almost 30 years teaching in the public school system. She married William Dean in 1939, but they divorced less than a year later; Dean decided to keep her husband's surname. Dean died in 1974, aged 88, from complications caused by a major stroke.

== Career ==
Dean became a passionate naturalist and conservationist after teaching. One of her projects in the 1940s was the campaign to have the U.S. government to declare Alabama's Clear Creek Falls a national park, although the campaign failed and the falls were ultimately incorporated into Lewis Smith Lake. In the 1950s–60s, she helped to found the Alabama Ornithological Society, the Alabama Environmental Council, and the Alabama Conservation Council (then known as the Alabama Conservancy). Additionally, she was involved in the Birmingham Audubon Society, the Alabama Academy of Science, the National Association of Biology Teachers, the American Fern Society, and Delta Kappa Gamma. She established an Outdoor Nature Camp in 1951, which she directed annually for thirteen years to educate teachers and other adults about Alabama's natural history. In 1967, after assisting the Alabama Environmental Council in designating Alabama's first national forest, William B. Bankhead National Forest, she was awarded a prize from the National Audubon Society for conservation education; she was the first person from Alabama to receive such an award.

Dean was inspired to write several books on Alabama's zoology and botany by her frustration with the lack of books available on the subject. She self-published Let's Learn the Birds of Alabama in 1957, Trees and Shrubs in the Heart of Dixie in 1961, and Let's Learn the Ferns of Alabama in 1964. Her 1973 work Wildflowers of Alabama and Adjoining States was later re-published by the University of Alabama Press.

== Legacy ==
In 1975, Dean won the Alabama Library Association's first posthumous Annual Author Award for her non-fiction books. The Alabama Wildflower Society later established the Blanche E. Dean Scholarship Fund and named its Birmingham chapter after Dean. She was inducted into the Alabama Women's Hall of Fame in 1985.
