= List of first women lawyers and judges in Alabama =

This is a list of the first women lawyer(s) and judge(s) in Alabama. It includes the year in which the women were admitted to practice law (in parentheses). Also included are women who achieved other distinctions such becoming the first in their state to graduate from law school or become a political figure.

== Firsts in Alabama's history ==
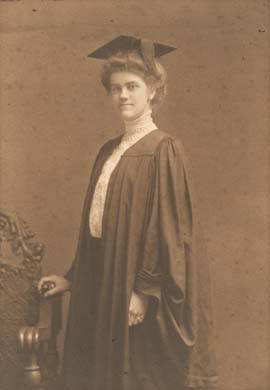
Maud McClure Kelly: First female lawyer in Alabama (1908)

=== Law school and bar ===
- First female law graduate and first admitted to the bar: Luelle Lamar Allen (1907):

=== Lawyers ===
- First female: Maud McLure Kelly (1908)
- First African American female: Mahala Ashley Dickerson (1948)
- One of Alabama's first Korean American lawyers (2008): Doh Ah Kim

=== State judges ===
- First female: Virginia Henry Mayfield in 1923
- First African American female: Faya Ora Rose Touré
- First female (Alabama Court of Appeals): Annie Lola Price (1928) in 1951
- First female (Supreme Court of Alabama): Janie Shores (1959) in 1974
- First elected female (trial judge): Phyllis S. Nesbit in 1976
- First female (probate judge): Earlean Isaac in 1989
- First female (district court judge): Sharon Lovelace Blackburn in 1991
- First female chief justice (Supreme Court of Alabama): Sue Bell Cobb (1981) in 2006
- First (African American) female (elected state judge): Deborah Biggers (1975) in 2014
- First (African American) female (presiding judge): Elisabeth French in 2020

=== Federal judges ===
- First female (Judge; Southern District of Alabama): Callie "Ginny" V. Granade (1975) in 2002
- First minority [female] (U.S. Magistrate Judge, Southern District of Alabama): Sonja Bivins in 2004

=== Attorney general of Alabama ===
- First female (acting): Alice Martin (1981) in 2017

=== Deputy attorney general of Alabama ===
- First female: Ellen Brooks in 1991

=== United States attorney ===
- First female (Northern District of Alabama): Alice Martin (1981) in 2001
- First Jewish American female: Joyce Vance in 2009

=== Assistant United States attorney ===
- First female (Southern District of Alabama): Callie "Ginny" V. Granade (1975) from 1977-2011

=== District attorneys ===
- First female: Janice Clardy in 1985
- First African American female: Lynneice Washington (1996) in 2017

=== Assistant district attorney ===
- First female: Judith "Judy" Crittenden (1970)

=== Political office ===
- First females elected to U.S. House of Representatives from Alabama: Terri Sewell (1994) and Martha Roby (c. 2001) in 2010
- First female elected to U.S. Senate from Alabama: Katie Britt in 2022

=== Alabama State Bar Association ===
- First African American female (admitted to state bar): Estelle Henderson (1919)
- First female president: Alyce Manley in 2010

== Firsts in local history ==
- Martha Lynn Sherrod: First African American female judge to win a partisan election in North Alabama
- Inge Prytz Johnson (1973): First female to serve on the 31st Judicial Circuit Court of Alabama (1978)
- Shannon Clark: First female serve as a Judge of the Twelfth District in Alabama (2011)
- Kimberly Clark (1996): First female serve as a Judge of the Thirty-Third Judicial Circuit in Alabama (2015)
- Janice Clardy: First female to serve as a District Attorney in the Nineteenth Judicial Circuit of Alabama (1985) [Autauga, Chilton and Elmore Counties, Alabama]
- Phyllis S. Nesbit: First female to serve on the Baldwin County District Court (1976). She was also the first female president of the Baldwin County Bar Association, Alabama (1966-1967).
- Sherry Burns: First female judge in Blount County, Alabama (2010)
- Shannon Clark: First female circuit court judge for Coffee and Pike Counties, Alabama (2011)
- Sue Bell Cobb (1981): First female judge in Conecuh County, Alabama
- Eugenia Lee Loggins (1978): First female lawyer in the city of Opp and Covington County, Alabama
- Juliet St. John Given (1976): First female lawyer in Cullman County, Alabama
- Kimberly Clark: First female circuit court judge in Dale and Geneva Counties, Alabama (2015)
- Earlean Isaac: First African American female to serve on the Greene County Probate Court in Alabama (1989)
- Lori Collier Ingram: First female district court judge in Houston County, Alabama (2009)
- Deborah Dunsmore: First female municipal court judge in Scottsboro, Alabama (2022) [Jackson County, Alabama]
- Nina Miglionico: First female (a lawyer) to become a member of the Birmingham City Council (1963) [Jefferson County, Alabama]
- Judith "Judy" Crittenden (1970): First female to become an Assistant District Attorney in Jefferson County, Alabama
- Agnes Chappell (1977): First African American female lawyer in Jefferson County, Alabama. She would later become a judge.
- Helen Shores Lee (1987): First African American female to serve on the Civil Division of the Circuit Court of Jefferson County (2003)
- Kira Fonteneau: First (African American) female to head the then newly created Jefferson County Public Defender Office (2012)
- Lynneice Washington (1996): First female (and African American female) District Attorney in Jefferson County, Alabama (2017)
- Elisabeth French: First female to serve as the Presiding Judge of the Jefferson County Court in Alabama (2020)
- Deborah Bell Paseur (1977): First female lawyer in Lauderdale County, Alabama. She would later become a judge.
- Angie Hamilton: First female to serve as an Assistant District Attorney for Lauderdale County, Alabama (2017)
- Angela Dawson Terry (1998): First female district judge in Lawrence County, Alabama
- Jessica Ventiere: First female District Attorney for Lee County, Alabama (2022)
- Samantha Copelan: First female judge in Lee County, Alabama (2024)
- Linda W.H. Henderson: First female president of the Macon County Bar Association (2000-2003, et al.)
- Martha Lynn Sherrod: First African American (female) to serve as the Assistant District Attorney and a Presiding Municipal and District Court Judge in Madison County, Alabama
- Andrea LeCroy: First female probate judge in Marshall County, Alabama
- Jennifer Bray: First female to serve as the District Attorney for Marshall County, Alabama (2023)
- Sonja Bivins: First African American [female] magistrate in Mobile, Mobile County, Alabama
- Frankie Fields Smith: First African American female to serve as a Municipal Court Judge in Mobile County, Alabama (1975)
- Ashley Rich: First female District Attorney of Mobile County, Alabama (2010)
- Eldora Anderson: First African American female (and African American in general) probate judge in Perry County, Alabama (2006)
- Amy Newsome: First female district court judge in Randolph County, Alabama (2018)
- Brandi Williams: First female municipal court judge in St. Clair County, Alabama (2018)
- Patricia M. Smith: First female judge in Shelby County, Alabama
- Jill Lee: First female to become District Attorney for Shelby County, Alabama (2014)
- Virginia H. Mayfield: First female judge in Tuscaloosa County, Alabama (1923)
- Mabey Yerby Lawson: First female to graduate from the University of Alabama law school (Tuscaloosa County)
- Jane Kimbrough Dishuck (1947): First female lawyer in Tuscaloosa County, Alabama
- Corey G. Seale: First female circuit court judge in Tuscaloosa County, Alabama (2026)
- Briana Westry-Robinson: First African-American female to serve as the youngest judge in Wilcox County, Alabama (2017)

== See also ==
- List of first women lawyers and judges in the United States (nationwide)
- Timeline of women lawyers in the United States
- Women in law

== Other topics of interest ==
- List of first minority male lawyers and judges in the United States
- List of first minority male lawyers and judges in Alabama
