= Malika Sanders-Fortier =

American politician

Member of the Alabama Senate from the 23rd district
- In office November 7, 2018 – November 9, 2022
- Preceded by: Henry Sanders
- Succeeded by: Robert Stewart

Personal details
- Born: Malika Asha Sanders; 1973 (age 52–53) Selma, Alabama, U.S.
- Party: Democratic
- Relatives: Henry Sanders (father); Faya Ora Rose Touré (mother)
- Education: Spelman College (BA); Birmingham School of Law (JD)

Malika Asha Sanders-Fortier (born 1973) is an American attorney and politician serving as a member of the Alabama Senate from the 23rd district. She assumed office on November 7, 2018. She was a Democratic candidate in the 2022 Alabama gubernatorial election.

== Early life and education ==
Sanders-Fortier was born in Selma, Alabama. She earned a Bachelor of Arts degree in psychology from Spelman College and a Juris Doctor from the Birmingham School of Law.

== Career ==
After graduating from college, Sanders-Fortier returned to Selma and worked as the executive director of 21st Century Youth Leadership Movement. She is a member of the Alabama State Bar and the Black Belt Lawyers Association. Sanders-Fortier was elected to the Alabama Senate in November 2018, succeeding her father, Henry Sanders. In January 2021, Sanders-Fortier introduced legislation to rename the Edmund Pettus Bridge.

In January 2022, Sanders-Fortier announced that she would not seek re-election, and that her father would attempt to reclaim his old seat in her place. That same month, Sanders-Fortier qualified as a Democratic candidate for governor instead. The two advanced to a runoff on June 21, 2022, with Yolanda Flowers winning the nomination.

== Electoral results ==
2022 Democratic gubernatorial primary
Party	Candidate	Votes	%
Democratic	Yolanda Rochelle Flowers	56,859	33.8%
Democratic	Arthur Kennedy	15,654	9.3%
Democratic	Chad Martin	9,360	5.6%
Democratic	Patricia Jamieson Salter	19,665	11.7%
Democratic	Malika Sanders-Fortier	54,636	32.5%
Democratic	Doug Smith	11,900	7.1%
Total votes		168,074	100.0%

2018 Alabama Senate election, District 23
Party	Candidate	Votes	%
Democratic	Malika Sanders-Fortier	30,193	65.53
Independent	Mark Story	15,796	34.28
Write-in		88	0.19
