= Senator Griffith =

Senator Griffith may refer to:

- Aquilla A. Griffith (1878–1947), Alabama State Senate
- Frederick W. Griffith (1858–1928), New York State Senate
- Henry W. Griffith (1897–1956), New York State Senate
- Melony G. Griffith (born 1963), Maryland State Senate
- Parker Griffith (born 1942), Alabama State Senate
- Silas L. Griffith (1837–1903), Vermont State Senate
