= 2022 Alabama gubernatorial election =

- November 8, 2022
- Turnout: 38.50% ▼
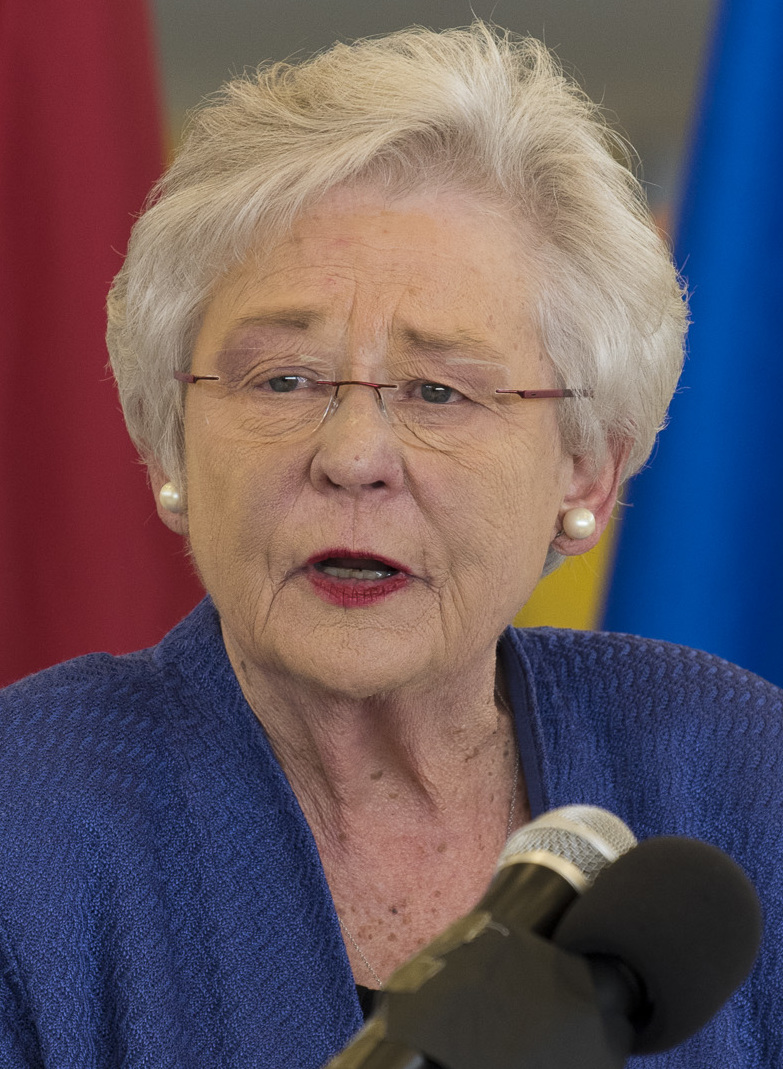

Nominee	Kay Ivey	Yolanda Flowers
Party	Republican	Democratic
Popular vote	946,932	412,961
Percentage	66.91%	29.18%
- Ivey: 40–50% 50–60% 60–70% 70–80% 80–90% >90% Flowers: 40–50% 50–60% 60–70% 70–80% 80–90% >90%
Governor before election
Kay Ivey
Republican
Elected Governor
Kay Ivey
Republican

The 2022 Alabama gubernatorial election took place on November 8, 2022. Incumbent Governor Kay Ivey won her bid for a second full term with more than 66% of the vote. This was the sixth consecutive time that a Republican was elected governor of Alabama. Ivey was sworn in for her second full term on January 16, 2023.

Primary elections in Alabama were held on May 24. Runoff elections for instances where no candidate received a majority were scheduled for June 21. A runoff was avoided in the Republican primary, with Ivey winning outright. The Democratic primary advanced to a runoff between Malika Sanders-Fortier and Yolanda Flowers, with Flowers winning the Democratic nomination.

This was the first gubernatorial election in Alabama history in which both major party nominees were women. Flowers was also the first Black female gubernatorial nominee in Alabama history. She ran for Governor of Alabama again in 2026, when Ivey was term-limited, and lost the Democratic primary. Marengo and Russell counties voted Republican in a gubernatorial election for the first time since 1874.

== Republican primary ==
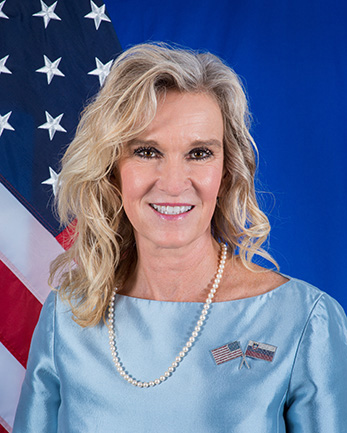
Former U.S. Ambassador Lynda Blanchard finished second in the primary.

=== Candidates ===
==== Nominee ====
- Kay Ivey, incumbent governor of Alabama

==== Eliminated in primary ====
- Lynda Blanchard, former United States Ambassador to Slovenia (2019–2021) and former candidate for U.S. Senate in 2022
- Lew Burdette, president of women and youth shelter King's Home in Chelsea
- Stacy Lee George, corrections officer, former Morgan County commissioner, and candidate for governor in 2014 and 2018
- Tim James, businessman, son of former governor Fob James, and candidate for governor in 2002 and 2010
- Donald Trent Jones, yoga instructor
- Dean Odle, pastor, author, founder and dean of a ministry school
- Dave Thomas, mayor of Springville (2020–present) and former state representative (1994–2002)
- Dean Young, businessman and perennial candidate

==== Declined ====
- Will Ainsworth, incumbent lieutenant governor (seeking re-election)
- Mo Brooks, U.S. representative (running for U.S. Senate)
- Steve Marshall, incumbent attorney general of Alabama (seeking re-election)
- Rick Pate, incumbent commissioner of Alabama Department of Agriculture and Industries (seeking re-election)
- Jim Zeigler, incumbent Alabama state auditor (2015–present) (formed exploratory committee but did not run; running for Secretary of State)

=== Endorsements ===
Lynda Blanchard

Individuals

- James Henderson, head of Christian Pro-Life Council, radio show host and former pastor
- Mike Lindell, founder of MyPillow and conspiracy theorist

Organizations

- American Conservative Union
Lew Burdette

Individuals

- Randy Howell, competitive fisherman and 2014 Bassmaster Classic winner
- Leland Whaley, conservative talk radio host of Leland Live
- Yaffee, conservative talk radio host of The Yaffee Program and Yellowhammer News contributor
Kay Ivey

State executives

- Will Ainsworth, incumbent lieutenant governor of Alabama (2019–present)

State senators

- Tom Butler, Alabama state senator for District 2 (Madison, 2018–present)
- Garlan Gudger, Alabama state senator for District 4 (Cullman, 2018-present)
- Andrew Jones, Alabama state senator for District 10 (Centre, 2018-present)
- Steve Livingston, Alabama state senator for District 8 (Scottsboro, 2014-present)
- Jim McClendon, Alabama state senator for District 11 (Springville, 2014-present)
- Tim Melson, Alabama state senator for District 1 (Florence, 2014–present)
- Arthur Orr, Alabama state senator for District 3 (Decatur, 2006-present)
- Greg Reed, president pro tempore of the Alabama Senate, Alabama state senator for District 5 (Jasper, 2010–present)
- Clay Scofield, majority leader of the Alabama Senate, Alabama state senator for District 9 (Guntersville, 2010-present)
- J. T. Waggoner, Alabama state senator for District 16 (Vestavia Hills, 1990–present)

State representatives

- Russell Bedsole, Alabama state representative for District 49 (Brierfield, 2018-present)
- K.L. Brown, Alabama state representative for District 40 (Jacksonville, 2010-present)
- Terri Collins, Alabama state representative for District 8 (Decatur, 2010–present)
- Danny Crawford, Alabama state representative for District 5 (Athens, 2016–present)
- Dickie Drake, Alabama state representative for District 45 (Leeds, 2011-present)
- Corley Ellis, Alabama state representative for District 41 (Columbiana, 2018-present)
- Tracy Estes, Alabama state representative for District 17 (Winfield, 2018-present)
- David Faulkner, Alabama state representative for District 46 (Mountain Brook, 2014-present)
- Danny Garrett, Alabama state representative for District 44 (Trussville, 2014-present)
- Lynn Greer, Alabama state representative for District 2 (Rogersville, 2002–present)
- Jim Hill, Alabama state representative for District 50 (Moody, 2014-present)
- Steve Hurst, Alabama state representative for District 35 (Munford, 1998-present)
- Wes Kitchens, Alabama state representative for District 27 (Arab, 2018-present)
- Nathaniel Ledbetter, majority leader of the Alabama House of Representatives, Alabama state representative for District 24 (Rainsville, 2014-present)
- Craig Lipscomb, Alabama state representative for District 30 (Gadsden, 2018-present)
- Mac McCutcheon, Speaker of the Alabama House of Representatives, Alabama state representative for District 25 (Monrovia, 2006-present)
- Parker Moore, Alabama state representative for District 4 (Decatur, 2018–present)
- Rex Reynolds, Alabama state representative for District 21 (Huntsville, 2018–present)
- Kerry Rich, Alabama state representative for District 26 (Albertville, 2018-present)
- Ben Robbins, Alabama state representative for District 33 (Sylacauga, 2018-present)
- Proncey Robertson, Alabama state representative for District 7 (Mount Hope, 2018–present)
- Howard Sanderford, Alabama state representative for District 20 (Huntsville, 1989–present)
- Ginny Shaver, Alabama state representative for District 39 (Leesburg, 2018-present)
- Randall Shedd, Alabama state representative for District 11 (Cullman, 2013-present)
- Kyle South, Alabama state representative for District 16 (Fayette, 2014-present)
- Scott Stadthagen, Alabama state representative for District 9 (Hartselle, 2018-present)
- David Standridge, Alabama state representative for District 34 (Hayden, 2010-present)
- Rodney Sullivan, Alabama state representative for District 61 (Northport, 2018-present)
- Tim Wadsworth, Alabama state representative for District 14 (Arley, 2014-present)
- Andy Whitt, Alabama state representative for District 6 (Harvest, 2018–present)
- Randy Wood, Alabama state representative for District 36 (Anniston, 2002-present)

Mayors

- Ron Anders, mayor of Auburn (2018–present)
- Woody Baird, mayor of Alexander City (2020–present)
- Ed Beasley, mayor of Luverne (2016–present)
- Mark Blankenship, mayor of Ozark (2020–present)
- Becky Bracke, mayor of Opp (2017–present)
- Bubba Copeland, mayor of Smiths Station (2016–2023)
- Gary Fuller, mayor of Opelika (2004–present)
- David Hayes, mayor of Geneva (2020–present)
- Earl Johnson, mayor of Andalusia (2000–present)
- Tommy Miller, mayor of Notasulga (2013–present)
- Jimmy Money, mayor of Abbeville (2020–present)
- Jason Reeves, mayor of Troy (2012–present)
- Mark Saliba, mayor of Dothan (2017–present)
- Sandy Stimpson, mayor of Mobile (2013–present)

Law enforcement

- 31 county sheriffs and police chiefs

Organizations

- Alabama Association of Realtors
- Alabama Forestry Association
- Business Council of Alabama
- Coastal 150
- League of Southeastern Credit Unions
- Manufacture Alabama
- National Right to Life
- NRA Political Victory Fund

PACs

- Alabama RetailPAC
- Susan B. Anthony List Candidate Fund
Tim James

State senators

- Larry Stutts, Alabama state senator for District 6 (Tuscumbia, 2014–present)

State representatives

- Tommy Hanes, Alabama state representative for District 23 (Bryant, 2014–present)
- Mike Holmes, Alabama state representative for District 31 (Wetumpka, 2014–present)
- Ritchie Whorton, Alabama state representative for District 22 (Owens Cross Roads, 2014–present)
- Rich Wingo, Alabama state representative for District 62 (Tuscaloosa, 2015–present)

Individuals

- Bill Armistead, chairman of the Alabama Republican Party (2011–2015), former Alabama state senator for District 14 (1995–2003) (James' campaign chairman)
- Dale Jackson, conservative talk radio host of The Dale Jackson Show and Yellowhammer News contributor
- Luke Lawson, governor of Alabama Alabama Boys State, and political activist (Democratic)
- Betty Peters, former member of the Alabama State Board of Education (2003–2019)

Political parties

- Alabama Conservative Party

Organizations

- Alabama Christian Education Association
- American Family Association Action
- Christian Conservatives of Alabama

PACs

- Coal Miners Political Action Committee
Dean Odle

Individuals

- Beatrice Nichols, Republican nominee for Alabama's 7th congressional district in 2022
- Troy Towns, former vice chair and former director of minority outreach for the Alabama Republican Party

Newspapers

- The Highland Park Review

Businesses

- Pigfarm Gun Range

Organizations

- Alabama First Alliance
- South Alabama Republican Assembly
- Stand for Health Freedom
Dave Thomas

Organizations

- Alabama Cannabis Coalition
- Alabama Republicans Against Marijuana Prohibition

=== Debates and forums ===
2022 Alabama Republican gubernatorial primary debates and forums
No.	Date	Location	Host	Moderator	Link	Participants								
P Participant A Absent N Non-invitee I Invitee W Withdrawn														
P Participant A Absent N Non-invitee I Invitee W Withdrawn						Blanchard	Burdette	George	Ivey	James	Jones	Odle	Thomas	Young
1	Jan 19, 2022	Enterprise	Coffee County Republican Women	Jan White		P	A	A	A	P	A	P	A	A
2	Feb 01, 2022	Huntsville	Republican Women of Huntsville	Terri Terrell		P	P	A	A	P	A	P	A	A
3	Feb 10, 2022	Fairhope	Eastern Shore Republican Women	Jeff Poor	N/A	P	P	A	A	P	P	P	P	P
4	Feb 10, 2022	Dothan	Houston County Republican Party	Brandon Shoupe		P	A	A	A	P	A	P	A	A
5	Feb 28, 2022	Greenville	Butler County Republican Party	N/A	N/A	P	P	A	A	P	A	P	A	A
6	Mar 07, 2022	Athens	Athens-Limestone Republican Women	Tracy Smith	N/A	P	A	A	A	P	A	P	A	A
7	Mar 10, 2022	Hoover	LOCAL Alabama	Allison Sinclair; Stephanie Smith		P	P	A	A	P	A	P	P	A
8	Apr 12, 2022	Cullman	Cullman County Republican Women	Charlotte Covert		P	P	A	A	P	P	P	P	A
9	Apr 26, 2022	Huntsville	Focus on America	Scott Beason; Rebecca Rogers		P	P	A	A	P	P	P	P	A
10	May 11, 2022	Prattville	Autauga County Republican Party	John Wahl		P	P	A	A	A	P	P	A	A
11	May 14, 2022	Vestavia Hills	Mid Alabama Republican Club	N/A	N/A	P	P	A	A	A	A	P	A	P

=== Polling ===
Graphical summary

Aggregate polls

Source of poll aggregation	Dates administered	Dates updated	Lynda Blanchard	Lew Burdette	Kay Ivey	Tim James	Dean Odle	Dean Young	Other (Note: Calculated by taking the difference of 100% and all other candidates combined.)	Margin
Real Clear Politics	May 15–21, 2022	May 24, 2022	14.3%	7.7%	49.3%	18.0%	2.7%	1.3%	5.7%	Ivey +31.3

Poll source	Date(s) administered	Sample size (Note: Key: A – all adults RV – registered voters LV – likely voters V – unclear)	Margin of error	Lynda Blanchard	Lew Burdette	Stacy George	Kay Ivey	Tim James	Donald Jones	Dean Odle	Dave Thomas	Dean Young	Jim Zeigler	Other	Undecided
The Trafalgar Group (R)	May 18–21, 2022	1,060 (LV)	± 2.9%	17%	7%	–	47%	17%	–	3%	–	3%	–	1%	6%
McLaughlin & Associates (R) (Note: Poll sponsored by ForestPAC, a wing of the Alabama Forestry Association, which supports Ivey)	May 16–19, 2022	500 (LV)	± 4.4%	17%	8%	–	45%	18%	–	4%	–	–	–	–	9%
Cygnal (R)	May 15–16, 2022	634 (LV)	± 3.9%	13%	8%	–	48%	16%	–	2%	–	0%	–	2%	11%
Emerson College	May 15–16, 2022	706 (LV)	± 3.6%	11%	7%	0%	46%	17%	0%	3%	0%	0%	–	–	15%
McLaughlin & Associates (R)	May 9–12, 2022	500 (LV)	± 4.4%	15%	8%	–	52%	15%	–	3%	–	–	–	–	7%
Cygnal (R)	May 6–7, 2022	600 (LV)	± 4.0%	15%	6%	–	40%	18%	–	4%	–	1%	–	4%	14%
The Tarrance Group (R) (Note: Poll sponsored by Ivey's campaign)	April 18–20, 2022	600 (LV)	± 4.1%	14%	–	–	57%	12%	–	–	–	–	–	5%	12%
Emerson College	March 25–27, 2022	687 (LV)	± 3.7%	8%	4%	0%	48%	11%	1%	1%	2%	2%	–	–	22%
Cygnal (R)	March 16–17, 2022	600 (LV)	± 4.0%	10%	2%	–	46%	12%	–	5%	–	–	–	3%	21%
Wisemen Consulting (R)	March 15–17, 2022	905 (LV)	± 3.4%	12%	2%	1%	58%	16%	<1%	1%	<1%	<1%	–	–	9%
McLaughlin & Associates (R)	March 10–13, 2022	500 (LV)	± 4.4%	11%	–	1%	60%	14%	–	–	–	–	–	–	14%
1892 Polling (R)	March 8–10, 2022	600 (LV)	± 4.0%	8%	–	–	60%	13%	–	–	–	–	–	6%	13%
The Tarrance Group (R)	February 28 – March 2, 2022	600 (RV)	± 4.1%	10%	–	–	61%	13%	–	–	–	–	–	4%	12%
Cherry Communications (R) (Note: Poll sponsored by FarmPAC, a wing of the Alabama Farmers Federation)	February 2–6, 2022	600 (LV)	± 4.0%	10%	–	–	55%	11%	–	–	–	–	–	2%	22%
Cygnal (R)	August 17–18, 2021	600 (LV)	± 4.0%	–	–	–	42%	4%	–	3%	–	–	9%	9%	34%

=== Primary results ===
Results by county: Ivey: 30–40%; 40–50%; 50–60%; 60–70%; 70–80%

Results by precinct: Ivey: 20–30%; 30–40%; 40–50%; 50–60%; 60–70%; 70–80%; 80–90%; >90%; Blanchard: 30–40%; 40–50%; 50–60%; 60–70%; >90%; James: 30–40%; 40–50%; 50–60%; 60–70%; >90%; Burdette: 30–40%; 40–50%; 50–60%; >90%; George: 60–70%; Young: >90%; Tie: 20–30%; 30–40%; 40–50%; 50%; No votes

Republican primary results
Party	Candidate	Votes	%
Republican	Kay Ivey (incumbent)	357,069	54.45%
Republican	Lynda Blanchard	126,202	19.25%
Republican	Tim James	106,181	16.19%
Republican	Lew Burdette	42,924	6.55%
Republican	Dean Odle	11,767	1.79%
Republican	Donald Trent Jones	3,821	0.58%
Republican	Dave Thomas	2,886	0.44%
Republican	Stacy Lee George	2,546	0.39%
Republican	Dean Young	2,356	0.36%
Total votes		655,752	100.0%

== Democratic primary ==
=== Candidates ===
==== Nominee ====
- Yolanda Rochelle Flowers, activist, retired rehabilitation specialist and educator

==== Eliminated in runoff ====
- Malika Sanders-Fortier, attorney and state senator from the 23rd District (2018–2022)

==== Eliminated in primary ====
- Patricia Salter Jamieson, nurse and licensed minister
- Arthur Kennedy, Army veteran and educator
- Chad "Chig" Martin, small business owner, musician and independent candidate for governor in 2018 (switched from independent)
- Doug "New Blue" Smith, developmental economist, retired corporate attorney and perennial candidate

==== Failed to qualify ====
- Christopher A. Countryman, equality activist, licensed minister, motivational speaker, former juvenile corrections officer and candidate for governor in 2018

==== Declined ====
- Walt Maddox, mayor of Tuscaloosa and nominee for governor in 2018

=== Endorsements ===
Yolanda Flowers

Organizations

- Democrats for Life of America
Malika Sanders-Fortier

Organizations

- Alabama New South Alliance

=== First round ===
==== Debates and forums ====
2022 Alabama Democratic gubernatorial primary debates and forums
No.	Date	Location	Host	Moderator	Link	Participants					
P Participant A Absent N Non-invitee I Invitee W Withdrawn											
P Participant A Absent N Non-invitee I Invitee W Withdrawn						Flowers	Kennedy	Martin	Salter	Sanders- Fortier	Smith
1	Mar 10, 2022	Hoover	LOCAL Alabama	Allison Sinclair; Stephanie Smith	YouTube	P	P	P	P	P	P
2	Apr 07, 2022	Fort Payne	DeKalb County Democratic Party	N/A	N/A	P	A	P	A	A	P
3	Apr 22, 2022	Dothan	Houston County Democratic Party	N/A	N/A	P	P	P	P	P	P

==== Polling ====
Poll source	Date(s) administered	Sample size	Margin of error	Yolanda Flowers	Patricia Jamieson	Arthur Kennedy	Chad Martin	Malika Sanders-Fortier	Doug Smith	Undecided
Emerson College	May 15–16, 2022	294 (LV)	± 5.7%	29%	2%	5%	7%	5%	3%	49%
Emerson College	March 25–27, 2022	359 (LV)	± 5.1%	11%	3%	7%	4%	8%	8%	59%

==== Results ====
Results by county: Flowers: 20–30%; 30–40%; 40–50%; 50–60%; Sanders-Fortier: 20–30%; 30–40%; 40–50%; 50–60%; 60–70%; Jamieson: 60–70%; Martin: 30–40%

Results by precinct: Flowers: 20–30%; 30–40%; 40–50%; 50–60%; 60–70%; 70–80%; 80–90%; >90%; Sanders-Fortier: 20–30%; 30–40%; 40–50%; 50–60%; 60–70%; 70–80%; 80–90%; >90%; Jamieson: 20–30%; 30–40%; 40–50%; 50–60%; 60–70%; 70–80%; 80–90%; >90%; Kennedy: 20–30%; 30–40%; 40–50%; 50–60%; 60–70%; 70–80%; >90%; Smith: <30%; 30–40%; 40–50%; 50–60%; 60–70%; 70–80%; >90%; Martin: 20–30%; 30–40%; 40–50%; 50–60%; 60–70%; 80–90%; >90%; Tie: 20–30%; 30–40%; 40–50%; 50%; No votes

Democratic primary results
Party	Candidate	Votes	%
Democratic	Yolanda Rochelle Flowers	56,991	33.88%
Democratic	Malika Sanders-Fortier	54,699	32.52%
Democratic	Patricia Jamieson Salter	19,691	11.71%
Democratic	Arthur Kennedy	15,630	9.29%
Democratic	Doug Smith	11,861	7.05%
Democratic	Chad Martin	9,352	5.56%
Total votes		168,224	100.0%

=== Runoff ===
==== Results ====
Runoff results by county: Flowers: 50–60%; 60–70%; 70–80%; 80–90%; Sanders-Fortier: 50–60%; 60–70%; Tie: 50%

Runoff results by precinct: Flowers: 50–60%; 60–70%; 70–80%; 80–90%; >90%; Sanders-Fortier: 50–60%; 60–70%; 70–80%; 80–90%; >90%; Tie: 50%; No votes

Democratic primary runoff results
Party	Candidate	Votes	%
Democratic	Yolanda Rochelle Flowers	32,529	55.14%
Democratic	Malika Sanders-Fortier	26,469	44.86%
Total votes		58,998	100.0%

== Independent and third-party candidates ==
=== Libertarian nomination ===
No primary was held for the Libertarian Party, and candidates were instead nominated by the party.

==== Nominee ====
- James "Jimmy" Blake, former Birmingham city councilman and former chair of the Libertarian Party of Alabama

=== Independent candidates ===
==== Declared ====
- Jared Budlong, marketing project manager (write-in campaign)
- Dean Odle, pastor, author and former Republican primary candidate (write-in campaign)

== General election ==
=== Predictions ===
Source	Ranking	As of
The Cook Political Report	Solid R	March 4, 2022
Inside Elections	Solid R	March 4, 2022
Sabato's Crystal Ball	Safe R	January 26, 2022
Politico	Solid R	April 1, 2022
RCP	Safe R	January 10, 2022
Fox News	Solid R	May 12, 2022
538	Solid R	June 30, 2022
Elections Daily	Safe R	November 7, 2022

=== Endorsements ===
Yolanda Flowers (D)

Labor unions

- Alabama AFL–CIO
- United Auto Workers

Organizations

- ~~Democrats for Life of America~~ (endorsement rescinded)
Jimmy Blake (L)

Organizations

- Alabama Cannabis Coalition
- LetBamaVote.org
Dean Odle (write-in)

Organizations

- Stand for Health Freedom

=== Polling ===
Poll source	Date(s) administered	Sample size	Margin of error	Kay Ivey (R)	Yolanda Flowers (D)	Jimmy Blake (L)	Other	Undecided
Cygnal (R)	October 27–29, 2022	616 (LV)	± 3.94%	60%	25%	5%	-	-

=== Results ===
2022 Alabama gubernatorial election
Party	Candidate	Votes	%	±%
Republican	Kay Ivey (incumbent)	946,932	66.91%	+7.45%
Democratic	Yolanda Rochelle Flowers	412,961	29.18%	−11.21%
Libertarian	James D. "Jimmy" Blake	45,958	3.25%	N/A
Write-in		9,432	0.67%	+0.52%
Total votes		1,415,283	100.00%	N/A
Republican hold				

==== By county ====
County	Kay Ivey Republican		Yolanda Rochelle Flowers Democratic		Various candidates Other parties		Margin		Total
County	#	%	#	%	#	%	#	%	Total
Autauga	13,387	75.45%	3,515	19.81%	842	4.75%	9,872	55.64%	17,744
Baldwin	58,823	80.37%	10,296	14.07%	4,068	5.56%	48,527	66.31%	73,187
Barbour	3,888	59.38%	2,549	38.93%	111	1.70%	1,339	20.45%	6,548
Bibb	4,681	79.55%	930	15.81%	273	4.64%	3,751	63.75%	5,884
Blount	14,895	89.70%	930	5.60%	780	4.70%	13,965	84.10%	16,605
Bullock	802	30.23%	1,806	68.07%	45	1.70%	-1,004	-37.84%	2,653
Butler	3,856	65.00%	1,937	32.65%	139	2.34%	1,919	32.35%	5,932
Calhoun	22,158	73.56%	6,912	22.95%	1,052	3.49%	15,246	50.61%	30,122
Chambers	5,961	65.15%	2,890	31.58%	299	3.27%	3,071	33.56%	9,150
Cherokee	6,971	88.94%	653	8.33%	214	2.73%	6,318	80.61%	7,838
Chilton	10,541	86.28%	1,268	10.38%	408	3.34%	9,273	75.90%	12,217
Choctaw	3,300	62.92%	1,841	35.10%	104	1.98%	1,459	27.82%	5,245
Clarke	5,359	59.24%	3,556	39.31%	132	1.46%	1,803	19.93%	9,047
Clay	3,638	85.70%	480	11.31%	127	2.99%	3,158	74.39%	4,245
Cleburne	4,200	90.97%	276	5.98%	141	3.05%	3,924	84.99%	4,617
Coffee	11,267	80.46%	2,221	15.86%	516	3.68%	9,046	64.60%	14,004
Colbert	13,001	75.26%	3,739	21.65%	534	3.09%	9,262	53.62%	17,274
Conecuh	2,618	58.48%	1,782	39.80%	77	1.72%	836	18.67%	4,477
Coosa	2,685	70.12%	1,001	26.14%	143	3.73%	1,684	43.98%	3,829
Covington	9,735	86.35%	1,193	10.58%	346	3.07%	8,542	75.77%	11,274
Crenshaw	3,622	78.89%	851	18.54%	118	2.57%	2,771	60.36%	4,591
Cullman	23,277	88.93%	1,662	6.35%	1,235	4.72%	21,615	82.58%	26,174
Dale	9,363	77.99%	2,222	18.51%	421	3.51%	7,141	59.48%	12,006
Dallas	4,060	35.77%	7,165	63.12%	126	1.11%	-3,105	-27.35%	11,351
DeKalb	15,227	88.88%	1,471	8.59%	435	2.54%	13,756	80.29%	17,133
Elmore	20,189	78.33%	4,508	17.49%	1,076	4.17%	15,681	60.84%	25,773
Escambia	7,286	75.25%	2,167	22.38%	229	2.37%	5,119	52.87%	9,682
Etowah	20,685	79.20%	4,593	17.59%	840	3.22%	16,092	61.61%	26,118
Fayette	4,708	85.40%	628	11.39%	177	3.21%	4,080	74.01%	5,513
Franklin	6,592	88.46%	646	8.67%	214	2.87%	5,946	79.79%	7,452
Geneva	7,049	88.36%	700	8.77%	229	2.87%	6,349	79.58%	7,978
Greene	608	20.32%	2,339	78.18%	45	1.50%	-1,731	-57.85%	2,992
Hale	2,288	43.95%	2,818	54.13%	100	1.92%	-530	-10.18%	5,206
Henry	5,102	75.57%	1,490	22.07%	159	2.36%	3,612	53.50%	6,751
Houston	21,139	76.52%	5,634	20.39%	852	3.08%	15,505	56.13%	27,625
Jackson	11,630	86.90%	1,386	10.36%	367	2.74%	10,244	76.54%	13,383
Jefferson	92,583	46.86%	96,175	48.68%	8,809	4.46%	-3,592	-1.82%	197,567
Lamar	3,831	87.53%	415	9.48%	131	2.99%	3,416	78.04%	4,377
Lauderdale	20,235	78.12%	4,761	18.38%	905	3.49%	15,474	59.74%	25,901
Lawrence	8,629	79.91%	1,707	15.81%	462	4.28%	6,922	64.10%	10,798
Lee	27,242	67.11%	11,803	29.08%	1,548	3.81%	15,439	38.03%	40,593
Limestone	23,770	75.77%	6,289	20.05%	1,313	4.19%	17,481	55.72%	31,372
Lowndes	1,309	32.04%	2,706	66.23%	71	1.74%	-1,397	-34.19%	4,086
Macon	1,244	23.17%	3,994	74.39%	131	2.44%	-2,750	-51.22%	5,369
Madison	72,059	59.86%	42,176	35.04%	6,143	5.10%	29,883	24.82%	120,378
Marengo	3,851	52.80%	3,317	45.48%	125	1.71%	534	7.32%	7,293
Marion	7,625	90.68%	528	6.28%	256	3.04%	7,097	84.40%	8,409
Marshall	21,345	88.06%	2,077	8.57%	818	3.37%	19,268	79.49%	24,240
Mobile	63,593	59.36%	38,910	36.32%	4,632	4.32%	24,683	23.04%	107,135
Monroe	4,313	61.23%	2,609	37.04%	122	1.73%	1,704	24.19%	7,044
Montgomery	23,565	40.83%	32,511	56.33%	1,636	2.83%	-8,946	-15.50%	57,712
Morgan	25,484	79.30%	5,362	16.69%	1,289	4.01%	20,122	62.62%	32,135
Perry	942	29.58%	2,187	68.67%	56	1.76%	-1,245	-39.09%	3,185
Pickens	4,212	63.73%	2,249	34.03%	148	2.24%	1,963	29.70%	6,609
Pike	5,375	65.98%	2,568	31.52%	203	2.49%	2,807	34.46%	8,146
Randolph	5,462	82.92%	925	14.04%	200	3.04%	4,537	68.88%	6,587
Russell	6,144	53.11%	5,146	44.48%	279	2.41%	998	8.63%	11,569
Shelby	51,196	73.20%	14,913	21.32%	3,830	5.48%	36,283	51.88%	69,939
St. Clair	23,055	82.57%	3,606	12.91%	1,262	4.52%	19,449	69.65%	27,923
Sumter	1,176	30.28%	2,656	68.38%	52	1.34%	-1,480	-38.11%	3,884
Talladega	14,313	66.13%	6,684	30.88%	647	2.99%	7,629	35.25%	21,644
Tallapoosa	10,444	76.95%	2,751	20.27%	378	2.78%	7,693	56.68%	13,573
Tuscaloosa	31,841	61.71%	17,937	34.76%	1,821	3.53%	13,904	26.95%	51,599
Walker	15,217	85.32%	1,905	10.68%	714	4.00%	13,312	74.64%	17,836
Washington	4,584	77.31%	1,206	20.34%	139	2.34%	3,378	56.97%	5,929
Wilcox	1,371	35.13%	2,489	63.77%	43	1.10%	-1,118	-28.64%	3,903
Winston	6,331	91.38%	344	4.97%	253	3.65%	5,987	86.42%	6,928
Totals	946,932	66.91%	412,961	29.18%	55,390	3.91%	533,971	37.73%	1,415,283

==== Counties that flipped from Democratic to Republican ====
- Marengo (largest city: Demopolis)
- Russell (largest city: Phenix City)
- Tuscaloosa (largest city: Tuscaloosa)

==== By congressional district ====
Ivey won six of seven congressional districts.

District	Ivey	Flowers	Representative
1st	68%	27%	Jerry Carl
2nd	70%	27%	Barry Moore
3rd	72%	25%	Mike Rogers
4th	84%	12%	Robert Aderholt
5th	69%	27%	Mo Brooks (117th Congress)
5th	69%	27%	Dale Strong (118th Congress)
6th	68%	27%	Gary Palmer
7th	37%	60%	Terri Sewell

== See also ==
- 2022 United States Senate election in Alabama
- 2022 United States House of Representatives elections in Alabama
- 2022 United States gubernatorial elections
- 2022 Alabama lieutenant gubernatorial election
- 2022 Alabama Senate election
- 2022 Alabama House of Representatives election
- 2022 Alabama elections

== Notes ==
Partisan clients
