= 1964 Alabama elections =

Elections in the U.S. state of Alabama in 1964

A general election was held in the U.S. state of Alabama on November 3, 1964. Primary elections were held on May 5, 1964, and primary runoffs were held on June 2, 1964.

== Federal offices ==
=== Presidential ===
Barry Goldwater received all ten electoral votes from Alabama.

== State offices ==
=== Judicial ===
==== Supreme Court ====
1964 Alabama Supreme Court election
- November 3, 1964

The 1964 Alabama Supreme Court election was held on November 3, 1964, to elect the chief justice and two associate justices to the Alabama Supreme Court. All three justices ran unopposed.

==== Court of Appeals ====
1964 Alabama Court of Appeals election
- November 3, 1964

The 1964 Alabama Court of Appeals election was held on November 3, 1964, to elect all three justices to the Alabama Court of Appeals. All three justices ran unopposed.

=== Place 1 ===
==== Democratic primary ====
===== Candidates =====
====== Nominee ======
- Annie Lola Price, incumbent justice

==== General election ====
===== Results =====
1964 Alabama Court of Appeals election, Place 1
Party	Candidate	Votes	%
Democratic	Annie Lola Price	262,584	100.00
Total votes		262,584	100.00

=== Place 2 ===
==== Democratic primary ====
===== Candidates =====
====== Nominee ======
- Aubrey M. Cates Jr., incumbent justice

==== General election ====
===== Results =====
1964 Alabama Court of Appeals election, Place 2
Party	Candidate	Votes	%
Democratic	Aubrey M. Cates Jr.	261,537	100.00
Total votes		261,537	100.00

=== Place 3 ===
==== Democratic primary ====
===== Candidates =====
====== Nominee ======
- George C. Johnson, incumbent justice

==== General election ====
===== Results (short term) =====
1964 Alabama Court of Appeals election, Place 3 (short term)
Party	Candidate	Votes	%
Democratic	George C. Johnson	260,471	100.00
Total votes		260,471	100.00

===== Results (full term) =====
1964 Alabama Court of Appeals election, Place 3
Party	Candidate	Votes	%
Democratic	George C. Johnson	262,555	100.00
Total votes		262,555	100.00
