= Frank Beckwith =

Frank Beckwith may refer to:

- Francis J. Beckwith (born 1960), American philosopher, Christian apologist and scholar
- Frank R. Beckwith (1904–1965), African American lawyer and civil rights activist
