= 1960 United States presidential election in Indiana =

- November 8, 1960
- Turnout: 73.9% ▲3.2 pp

Nominee	Richard Nixon	John F. Kennedy
Party	Republican	Democratic
Home state	California	Massachusetts
Running mate	Henry Cabot Lodge Jr.	Lyndon B. Johnson
Electoral vote	13	0
Popular vote	1,175,120	952,358
Percentage	55.03%	44.60%
County results
Nixon
40–50%
50–60%
60–70%
70–80%
Kennedy
50–60%
60–70%
President before election
Dwight D. Eisenhower
Republican
Elected President
John F. Kennedy
Democratic

A presidential election was held in Indiana on November 8, 1960, as part of the 1960 United States presidential election. The Republican ticket of the vice president of the United States Richard Nixon and the U.S. ambassador to the United Nations Henry Cabot Lodge, Jr. defeated the Democratic ticket of the junior U.S. senator from Massachusetts John F. Kennedy and the senior U.S. senator from Texas Lyndon B. Johnson. Kennedy defeated Nixon in the national election with 303 electoral votes.

== Primary elections ==
=== Republican Party ===
Nixon faced only token opposition from Frank R. Beckwith, an African American lawyer from Indianapolis. Although certain to carry the state's 32 delegates, the low stakes caused Nixon's supporters to worry that a small turnout could damage the candidate's public image in the days leading up to the primary.

Indiana Republican primary, May 3, 1960
Party	Candidate	Votes	%
Republican	Richard Nixon	408,408	95.40
Republican	Frank R. Beckwith	19,677	4.60
Total votes		428,085	100.00

=== Democratic Party ===
Kennedy campaign director Larry O'Brien visited Indiana in April 1959. He found that the field was relatively clear in the state, with only whispers of a possible favorite son candidacy by freshman U.S. senator Vance Hartke. While O'Brien determined that "there was no great groundswell for Kennedy" in Indiana, he found no evidence of a serious effort by Kennedy's rivals to contest the state. The absence of the other candidates allowed Kennedy to establish an early, commanding lead in the race for the state's 34 delegates.

Despite running effectively unopposed, Kennedy's Catholicism was a significant liability in the primary. Kennedy faced two paper candidates—retired pipefitter John H. Latham of Rockville, Indiana, and perennial candidate Lar Daly—who together polled nearly 19 percent of the primary vote. Significant voter rolloff, when combined with the votes for Latham and Daly, suggested that as many as one in four Democratic primary voters did not vote for Kennedy.

Indiana Democratic primary, May 3, 1960
Party	Candidate	Votes	%
Democratic	John F. Kennedy	353,832	81.01
Democratic	John H. Latham	42,084	9.64
Democratic	Lar Daly	40,853	9.35
Total votes		436,769	100.00

== General election ==
=== Results ===
1960 United States presidential election in Indiana
Party	Candidate	Votes	%	±%
Republican	Richard Nixon Henry Cabot Lodge Jr.	1,175,120	55.03	▼4.87
Democratic	John F. Kennedy Lyndon B. Johnson	952,358	44.60	▲4.90
Prohibition	Rutherford Decker E. Harold Munn	6,746	0.32	▼0.01
Socialist Labor	Eric Hass Georgia Cozzini	1,136	0.05	▼0.02
Total votes		2,135,360	100.00	

=== Results by county ===
1960 United States presidential election in Indiana by county
County	Richard Nixon Republican		John F. Kennedy Democratic		Others		Margin		Total
County	Votes	%	Votes	%	Votes	%	Votes	%	Total
Adams	6,972	61.11%	4,338	38.02%	99	0.87%	2,634	23.09%	11,409
Allen	60,103	60.33%	39,235	39.39%	280	0.28%	20,868	20.94%	99,618
Bartholomew	13,606	59.09%	9,290	40.35%	130	0.56%	4,316	18.74%	23,026
Benton	3,626	60.11%	2,399	39.77%	7	0.12%	1,227	20.34%	6,032
Blackford	3,738	53.33%	3,228	46.06%	43	0.61%	510	7.27%	7,009
Boone	8,979	62.28%	5,377	37.30%	60	0.42%	3,602	24.98%	14,416
Brown	1,679	51.76%	1,533	47.26%	32	0.99%	146	4.50%	3,244
Carroll	5,411	61.88%	3,299	37.73%	34	0.39%	2,112	24.15%	8,744
Cass	11,392	58.19%	8,091	41.33%	94	0.48%	3,301	16.86%	19,577
Clark	12,803	46.89%	14,431	52.85%	70	0.26%	-1,628	-5.96%	27,304
Clay	7,434	57.92%	5,342	41.62%	58	0.45%	2,092	16.30%	12,834
Clinton	9,620	59.32%	6,533	40.28%	64	0.39%	3,087	19.04%	16,217
Crawford	2,915	55.47%	2,305	43.86%	35	0.67%	610	11.61%	5,255
Daviess	8,285	60.20%	5,433	39.48%	45	0.33%	2,852	20.72%	13,763
Dearborn	7,619	54.99%	6,216	44.87%	19	0.14%	1,403	10.12%	13,854
Decatur	6,240	60.17%	4,080	39.34%	50	0.48%	2,160	20.83%	10,370
DeKalb	8,957	62.66%	5,277	36.92%	61	0.43%	3,680	25.74%	14,295
Delaware	26,167	52.75%	23,266	46.90%	177	0.36%	2,901	5.85%	49,610
Dubois	5,117	38.32%	8,214	61.51%	22	0.16%	-3,097	-23.19%	13,353
Elkhart	28,056	62.77%	16,264	36.39%	373	0.83%	11,792	26.38%	44,693
Fayette	6,729	55.97%	5,246	43.63%	48	0.40%	1,483	12.34%	12,023
Floyd	11,629	48.38%	12,346	51.36%	62	0.26%	-717	-2.98%	24,037
Fountain	6,123	58.71%	4,277	41.01%	29	0.28%	1,846	17.70%	10,429
Franklin	4,108	53.73%	3,523	46.08%	14	0.18%	585	7.65%	7,645
Fulton	6,038	66.11%	3,047	33.36%	48	0.53%	2,991	32.75%	9,133
Gibson	8,838	53.89%	7,479	45.61%	82	0.50%	1,359	8.28%	16,399
Grant	19,021	57.92%	13,642	41.54%	178	0.54%	5,379	16.38%	32,841
Greene	8,810	57.81%	6,325	41.51%	104	0.68%	2,485	16.30%	15,239
Hamilton	13,409	70.63%	5,511	29.03%	64	0.34%	7,898	41.60%	18,984
Hancock	7,543	60.21%	4,930	39.35%	55	0.44%	2,613	20.86%	12,528
Harrison	5,374	53.80%	4,566	45.71%	49	0.49%	808	8.09%	9,989
Hendricks	12,490	65.51%	6,481	33.99%	95	0.50%	6,009	31.52%	19,066
Henry	13,752	58.44%	9,629	40.92%	149	0.63%	4,123	17.52%	23,530
Howard	17,938	56.94%	13,415	42.58%	149	0.47%	4,523	14.36%	31,502
Huntington	10,658	59.44%	7,163	39.95%	109	0.61%	3,495	19.49%	17,930
Jackson	8,213	55.27%	6,582	44.29%	66	0.44%	1,631	10.98%	14,861
Jasper	5,364	64.32%	2,959	35.48%	16	0.19%	2,405	28.84%	8,339
Jay	6,519	56.73%	4,899	42.63%	74	0.64%	1,620	14.10%	11,492
Jefferson	6,333	55.11%	5,119	44.54%	40	0.35%	1,214	10.57%	11,492
Jennings	4,478	56.63%	3,403	43.03%	27	0.34%	1,075	13.60%	7,908
Johnson	12,426	62.38%	7,400	37.15%	93	0.47%	5,026	25.23%	19,919
Knox	11,490	53.40%	9,918	46.10%	108	0.50%	1,572	7.30%	21,516
Kosciusko	13,539	69.11%	5,839	29.80%	213	1.09%	7,700	39.31%	19,591
LaGrange	4,433	69.03%	1,965	30.60%	24	0.37%	2,468	38.43%	6,422
Lake	78,278	37.04%	132,554	62.72%	526	0.25%	-54,276	-25.68%	211,358
LaPorte	22,738	52.71%	20,317	47.10%	85	0.20%	2,421	5.61%	43,140
Lawrence	11,119	61.15%	6,977	38.37%	86	0.47%	4,142	22.78%	18,182
Madison	31,098	52.31%	28,154	47.36%	193	0.32%	2,944	4.95%	59,445
Marion	166,202	57.67%	121,336	42.10%	668	0.23%	44,866	15.57%	288,206
Marshall	10,460	62.47%	6,210	37.09%	74	0.44%	4,250	25.38%	16,744
Martin	2,756	51.55%	2,585	48.35%	5	0.09%	171	3.20%	5,346
Miami	8,844	58.45%	6,191	40.92%	96	0.63%	2,653	17.53%	15,131
Monroe	14,513	65.42%	7,535	33.97%	136	0.61%	6,978	31.45%	22,184
Montgomery	10,957	66.36%	5,477	33.17%	77	0.47%	5,480	33.19%	16,511
Morgan	9,416	63.36%	5,375	36.17%	69	0.46%	4,041	27.19%	14,860
Newton	3,517	65.12%	1,870	34.62%	14	0.26%	1,647	30.50%	5,401
Noble	8,069	60.27%	5,264	39.32%	54	0.40%	2,805	20.95%	13,387
Ohio	1,314	56.25%	1,015	43.45%	7	0.30%	299	12.80%	2,336
Orange	5,589	59.19%	3,818	40.44%	35	0.37%	1,771	18.75%	9,442
Owen	3,700	60.38%	2,379	38.82%	49	0.80%	1,321	21.56%	6,128
Parke	4,662	57.94%	3,361	41.77%	23	0.29%	1,301	16.17%	8,046
Perry	4,372	46.97%	4,920	52.86%	16	0.17%	-548	-5.89%	9,308
Pike	4,606	59.69%	3,046	39.48%	64	0.83%	1,560	20.21%	7,716
Porter	15,666	59.18%	10,733	40.54%	75	0.28%	4,933	18.64%	26,474
Posey	5,369	54.47%	4,457	45.22%	31	0.31%	912	9.25%	9,857
Pulaski	3,905	57.67%	2,746	40.56%	120	1.77%	1,159	17.11%	6,771
Putnam	6,583	57.63%	4,798	42.00%	42	0.37%	1,785	15.63%	11,423
Randolph	9,528	64.92%	5,035	34.31%	114	0.78%	4,493	30.61%	14,677
Ripley	6,053	55.95%	4,730	43.72%	35	0.32%	1,323	12.23%	10,818
Rush	6,215	63.54%	3,516	35.94%	51	0.52%	2,699	27.60%	9,782
St. Joseph	53,621	45.64%	63,553	54.09%	325	0.28%	-9,932	-8.45%	117,499
Scott	3,213	50.99%	3,064	48.63%	24	0.38%	149	2.36%	6,301
Shelby	9,421	56.75%	7,111	42.83%	70	0.42%	2,310	13.92%	16,602
Spencer	5,050	53.88%	4,303	45.91%	20	0.21%	747	7.97%	9,373
Starke	4,592	53.28%	3,995	46.35%	32	0.37%	597	6.93%	8,619
Steuben	5,464	67.63%	2,588	32.03%	27	0.33%	2,876	35.60%	8,079
Sullivan	6,012	49.85%	5,975	49.54%	73	0.61%	37	0.31%	12,060
Switzerland	1,929	49.40%	1,955	50.06%	21	0.54%	-26	-0.66%	3,905
Tippecanoe	24,572	63.55%	14,041	36.31%	55	0.14%	10,531	27.24%	38,668
Tipton	4,924	59.88%	3,299	40.12%	0	0.00%	1,625	19.76%	8,223
Union	2,087	63.73%	1,180	36.03%	8	0.24%	907	27.70%	3,275
Vanderburgh	41,068	52.90%	36,330	46.80%	237	0.31%	4,738	6.10%	77,635
Vermillion	4,798	46.92%	5,391	52.71%	38	0.37%	-593	-5.79%	10,227
Vigo	24,940	49.70%	25,105	50.03%	133	0.27%	-165	-0.33%	50,178
Wabash	10,420	68.12%	4,788	31.30%	89	0.58%	5,632	36.82%	15,297
Warren	2,870	64.29%	1,574	35.26%	20	0.45%	1,296	29.03%	4,464
Warrick	6,482	56.10%	5,042	43.64%	30	0.26%	1,440	12.46%	11,554
Washington	5,057	56.74%	3,821	42.87%	35	0.39%	1,236	13.87%	8,913
Wayne	19,764	60.66%	12,721	39.05%	95	0.29%	7,043	21.61%	32,580
Wells	6,034	58.91%	4,128	40.30%	80	0.78%	1,906	18.61%	10,242
White	6,678	62.93%	3,914	36.88%	20	0.19%	2,764	26.05%	10,612
Whitley	6,621	60.50%	4,266	38.98%	56	0.51%	2,355	21.52%	10,943
TOTAL	1,175,120	55.03%	952,358	44.60%	7,882	0.37%	222,762	10.43%	2,135,360

==== Counties that flipped from Republican to Democratic ====
- Clark
- Dubois
- Floyd
- Lake
- Perry
- Saint Joseph
- Vigo
- Vermillion

==== Counties that flipped from Democratic to Republican ====
- Sullivan

== See also ==
- United States presidential elections in Indiana

== Bibliography ==
- Hendricks, Charles O. (1960). Annual Election Report of the Secretary of State of the State of Indiana: 1960 General Election Statistics. Indianapolis: Indiana Secretary of State.
- Madison, James H. (1986). The Indiana Way: A State History. Bloomington: Indiana University Press.
- McGillivray, Alice V.; Scammon, Richard M. (1994). America at the Polls, 1960–1992: Kennedy to Clinton; A Handbook of American Presidential Election Statistics. Washington, D.C.: Congressional Quarterly.
- Oliphant, Thomas; Wilkie, Curtis (2017). The Road to Camelot: Inside JFK's Five-Year Campaign. New York: Simon and Schuster.
- Petersen, Svend (1963). A Statistical History of the American Presidential Elections. New York: Frederick Ungar Publishing Company. LCCN 62-21786.
