= Robert Stewart (Alabama politician) =

American politician

Member of the Alabama Senate from the 23rd district
- Incumbent
- Assumed office November 9, 2022
- Preceded by: Malika Sanders-Fortier

Personal details
- Born: February 4, 1990 (age 36) Selma, Alabama
- Party: Democratic
- Education: Tuskegee University (BS); Kennesaw State University (MAcc)
- Profession: Accountant

Robert Stewart (born February 4, 1990) is an American politician and accountant serving the 23rd district in the Alabama Senate, which includes Butler County, Clarke County, Conecuh County, Dallas County, Lowndes County, Monroe County, Perry County, and Wilcox County.

== Biography ==
Stewart was born on February 4, 1990 in Selma, Alabama. He won an academic scholarship to Tuskegee University, where he earned his bachelor's degree in science in accounting in May 2012. He then got a master's degree in July 2016 from Kennesaw State University. He is serving as a board member of All Abroad Inc., Steward Board of Shaw Temple AME Zion Church, Urban League of Young Professionals, a Charter Member of 100 Black Men of America, Inc in the Selma chapter, and is a life member of Alpha Phi Alpha fraternity. In 2019, he earned the Outstanding Young Alumni of the Year award from the United Negro College Fund. He is currently employed as a tax policy lobbyist for Public Citizen, a think tank in Washington, D.C.

Stewart was elected as a democrat to the Alabama Senate in the 23rd district on November 8, 2022. He received 53.4% of the vote against Republican Michael Nimmer's 44.6%. A difference of 8.8%, or about 4,000 votes. He was sworn in that night at midnight. Previously, in the democratic primary, Stewart defeated Hank Sanders.

Following the statewide abortion ban, Stewart and most of his democratic colleagues called for the law to be repealed, or for it to at least have exceptions. They created legislation and bills which attempted to do that, although with Republicans having a large majority in the Alabama Senate, the legislation wasn't expected to be passed. He said "This bill is a messaging bill, but most bills start with a message". None of their legislation would be passed.
