= List of first minority male lawyers and judges in Alabama =

This is a list of the first minority male lawyer(s) and judge(s) in Alabama. It includes the year in which the men were admitted to practice law (in parentheses). Also included are other distinctions such as the first minority men in their state to graduate from law school or become a political figure.

== Firsts in Alabama's history ==
=== Lawyers ===
- First African American male: Moses W. Moore (1871)
- First African American male from Alabama to practice before the U.S. Supreme Court: Samuel R. Lowery (1875) in 1880
- One of Alabama's first Korean American lawyers (2008): Soo Seok Yang

=== State judges ===
- First African American male: Roderick B. Thomas in 1874
- First African American male (circuit judge): Cain James Kennedy (1971) in 1979
- First African American male (probate court): William McKinley Branch in 1970
- First Italian American male (Alabama Court of Criminal Appeals): John P. DeCarlo in 1972
- First African American male (Alabama Supreme Court): Oscar W. Adams Jr. (1947) in 1980
- First African American male (Seventeenth Judicial Circuit in Alabama): Eddie Hardaway, Jr. (1978) in 1995
- First blind male (upon his appointment to a circuit court): Tony Cothren in 1996
- First African American male (Alabama Court of Civil Appeals): Bill Lewis in 2024

=== Federal judges ===
- First African American male (U.S. federal judge): U. W. Clemon (1968) in 1980
- First African American male (U.S. District Court for the Southern District of Alabama): Terry F. Moorer in 2018

=== Assistant Attorney General ===
- First African American male: Myron Herbert Thompson in 1972

=== United States Attorney ===
- First African American male: Kenyen R. Brown in 2009

=== Assistant United States Attorney ===
- First African American male (Northern District of Alabama): J. Richmond Pearson in 1967

=== District Attorney ===
- First African American male: Barrown Lankster in 1992
- First African American male (President of the Alabama District Attorney's Association): Michael W. Jackson in 2021

=== Alabama State Bar Association ===
- First African American male (President): Fred Gray Sr. in 2002

== Firsts in local history ==
- Michael W. Jackson: First African American male to serve as the District Attorney for the Fourth Judicial Circuit in Alabama (2004) [Bibb, Dallas, Hale, Perry and Wilcox Counties, Alabama]
- Eddie Hardaway, Jr. (1978): First African American male to serve on the Seventeenth Judicial Circuit in Alabama (1995)
- Rufus C. Huffman, Sr.: First African American male probate judge in Bullock County, Alabama (1976)
- J.L. Chestnut (1958): First African American male lawyer in Selma, Dallas County, Alabama
- Jimmy Nunn: First African American male to serve as the City Attorney of Selma, Dallas County, Alabama (2000)
- Orzell Billingsley and Peter Hall: First African American male lawyers to try a case in Dallas County, Alabama
- Jimmy Nunn: First African American male probate judge in Dallas County, Alabama (2018)
- William McKinley Branch: First African American male elected as a probate judge in Greene County, Alabama (1970)
- Arthur Crawford: First African American male to serve as a probate judge in Hale County, Alabama
- Theo Lawson II: First African American male to serve as the County Attorney of Jefferson County, Alabama (2016)
- Danny Carr: First African American male to serve as the District Attorney (Birmingham division) of Jefferson County, Alabama (2018)
- Oscar W. Adams Jr. (1947): First African-American male admitted to the Birmingham Bar Association [Jefferson and Shelby Counties, Alabama]
- J. Mason Davis: First African American male to serve as the President of the Birmingham Bar Association (1983) [Jefferson and Shelby Counties, Alabama]
- John Hulett: First African American male to serve as a probate judge in Lowndes County, Alabama
- Alfonza Menefee: First African American male probate judge in Macon County, Alabama (1988)
- Charles Swinger Conley: First African American male judge of the Court of Common Pleas (1972)
- Thomas H. Figures: First African American male to serve as the Assistant District Attorney for Mobile County, Alabama
- Steven Reed: First African American male to serve as a probate judge in Montgomery County, Alabama (2012)
- Michael Figures, Booker Forte, Jr., and Ronald E. Jackson: First African American males to graduate from the University of Alabama School of Law (1972)
- Eric Hamilton: First African American male to serve as an Assistant District Attorney for Walker County, Alabama (2013)

== See also ==
- List of first minority male lawyers and judges in the United States

== Other topics of interest ==
- List of first women lawyers and judges in the United States
- List of first women lawyers and judges in Alabama
