= Maud McLure Kelly =

American lawyer, suffragist and historian (1887–1973)

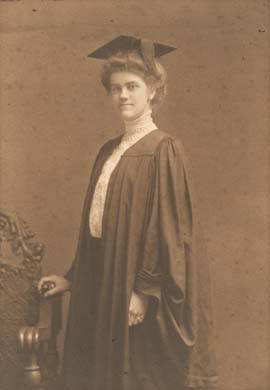
- Maud McClure Kelly in 1908
- Born: July 10, 1887; Oxford, Alabama, U.S.
- Died: April 2, 1973 (aged 85)
- Education: University of Alabama School of Law
- Occupation: Attorney
- Known for: first woman to practice law in the state of Alabama

Maud McClure Kelly (July 10, 1887 – April 2, 1973) was an American lawyer, suffragist and historian. She was the first woman to practice law in the state of Alabama and worked for the Alabama Department of Archives and History after her retirement from law.

== Biography ==
Maud McClure Kelly was born in 1887 in Oxford, Alabama, to Richard Bussey Kelly and Leona Bledsoe Kelly. Her father was a lawyer and both of her parents were strong supporters of the Democratic Party and the Confederacy. She graduated from the Noble Institute, a girls' school in Anniston, Alabama, in 1904, and moved with her family to Birmingham in 1905. In Birmingham, she began working as a stenographer in her father's office and, realizing her own interest in the legal profession, started to study law. She wrote the entrance exam for the University of Alabama School of Law in 1907 and was admitted as the school's second-ever female student. She graduated a year later as the third in her class and was admitted to the Alabama bar in October 1908, making her the first woman to practice law in the state.

Kelly established a practice in Birmingham in 1908 and worked on both civil and criminal cases. In 1914, having been nominated by William Jennings Bryan, she became the first Southern woman admitted to the bar of the Supreme Court of the United States. She relocated to Washington, D.C., in 1919 to work as a federal attorney for the Department of the Interior, and returned to her practice in Birmingham in 1924. She closed the practice and ended her legal work in 1931.

Kelly was also involved in the women's suffrage movement, serving as chairman on the legislative committees of both the Birmingham and Alabama Equal Suffrage Associations. She was a devoted Baptist and member of the Democratic Party; she worked for Democrat Al Smith's presidential campaign in 1928 and hosted the Alabama delegation of the 1932 Democratic National Convention. After retiring from law, she worked as an archivist and historian. She was hired by the Alabama Department of Archives and History in 1943 as an acquisitions agent, inspector of county records, and editor of the Alabama Historical Quarterly journal. She retired in 1956 and worked in genealogy until her death in 1973.

== Legacy ==
Kelly was inducted into the Alabama Women's Hall of Fame in 1990 and the Alabama Lawyers' Hall of Fame in 2014.

The Alabama State Bar's Women's Section gives the Maud McLure Kelly Award annually to a "female attorney who has made a lasting impact on the legal profession and has been a pioneer and leader within the state."

== See also ==
- List of first women lawyers and judges in Alabama
