= Annie Lola Price =

American judge

- Born: June 7, 1903; Cullman, Alabama
- Died: June 18, 1972 (aged 69); Montgomery, Alabama
- Occupations: attorney, judge
- Years active: 1928-1965
- Known for: first woman to serve on an Alabama appellate court

Annie Lola Price (1903–1972) was an Alabama, United States, lawyer, who was one of the first women to become licensed in the state. She was the first woman to serve as a legal advisor for a governor in Alabama and the first woman to serve on the state's appellate court. Between 1962 and 1972, she was the presiding judge of the Alabama Court of Criminal Appeals.

== Early life ==
Annie Lola Price was born on June 7, 1903, in Cullman, Alabama to Lena Mae (née Culpepper) and Dr. William Henry Price. After attending public schools, Price attended Athens College of Athens, Alabama. Then she attended Wheeler Business School in Birmingham before returning to Cullman to read the law in the office of Aquilla A. Griffith and Alabama Supreme Court Justice Joel B. Brown. Price passed her bar exam in 1928, making her one of the first women attorneys in Alabama. Soon after passing the bar, in the early 1930s, Price earned her pilot's license and became a member of the Ninety-Nines.

== Career ==
Price practiced law in Cullman and worked as a court reporter of the Eighth Judicial Circuit between 1935 and 1947. When Jim Folsom was elected as Governor of Alabama, Price moved with the Administration to Montgomery as an assistant legal advisor. Three years later, she became the first woman to serve as an advisor to an Alabama Governor, when she was appointed as the head legal advisor. In 1951, Price made history becoming the first woman appointed to serve as a judge, when she was appointed to fill the unexpired term of the late justice, Charles R. Bricken on the Alabama Court of Appeals. At that time, women in Alabama were not allowed to serve on juries and her appointment was seen as controversial. Price became a staunch and outspoken advocate to extend the right of jury service to women, though it would take fifteen years to accomplish. In 1965, when a bill addressing women's citizenship was up for consideration by the Alabama legislature which had not ratified the Nineteenth Amendment, Price argued that if women could serve as witnesses, court reporters and lawyers, they should be able to serve on juries. Women won the right when a U.S. Federal Panel ruled in 1966 that the law banning women jurors was invalid.

Price was also elected as president of the Alabama Women Lawyers' Association in 1951 and again in 1957. In 1952, she was elected to serve a six-year term on the Appellate Court and then ran unopposed in both the 1958 and 1964 elections. In 1962 when Robert B. Harwood ran for the Supreme Court of Alabama, Price became the presiding judge of the Court of Appeals. When the Alabama Court of Appeals was reorganized as the Alabama Court of Criminal Appeals in 1969, she became its first presiding judge and continued in that capacity until her death.

== Death ==
Price died following a short illness on 18 June 1972 in Montgomery. She was buried in the Montgomery City Cemetery.

== Honors ==
She was inducted into the Alabama Women's Hall of Fame in 1976 and the Alabama Lawyers Hall of Fame in 2004.

== See also ==
- List of first women lawyers and judges in Alabama

=== Bibliography ===
- Helms, Judith (January 17, 1965). "Alabama's Double Standard". The Gadsden Times. Gadsden, Alabama. pp. 22–23.
- Quillen, Jean (June 14, 1965). "Are Women Full Citizens of Alabama?". The Tuscaloosa News. Tuscaloosa, Alabama.
- Rogers, Pat (May 17, 1951). "Lady Judge and Pilot, Too". Cullman, Alabama: The Cullman Democrat – via Newspapers.com.
- "Annie Lola Price (1903-1972)". Alabama State Bar Association. Montgomery, Alabama: 2004 Lawyers' Hall of Fame. 2004. Archived from the original on July 14, 2015.
- "Burial Today for Annie Lola Price (pt. 1)". Cullman, Alabama: The Cullman Times Democrat. June 20, 1972 – via Newspaperarchive.com. and "Burial Today for Annie Lola Price (pt. 2)". Cullman, Alabama: The Cullman Times Democrat. June 20, 1972 – via Newspaperarchive.com.
- "Cullman's Judge Annie Lola Price Was a Woman Ahead of Her Time!". Cullman, Alabama: CullmanSense. 2015. Archived from the original on February 24, 2016.
- "Judge Price Proved Ability Counts". The Tuscaloosa News. Tuscaloosa, Alabama. June 16, 1972. Archived from the original on July 2, 2016.
- "Put Women on Juries, Court Tells Alabama". Milwaukee, Wisconsin: The Milwaukee Journal. February 8, 1966. Archived from the original on July 2, 2016.
- "Two Will Join the Hall of Fame". The Tuscaloosa News. Tuscaloosa, Alabama. October 13, 1976. Archived from the original on July 2, 2016.
- "Woman Appointed Judge". The Anniston Star. Anniston, Alabama. January 12, 1951 – via Newspapers.com.
- "Woman Judge is Ready to Serve". The Tuscaloosa News. Tuscaloosa, Alabama. January 14, 1951. Archived from the original on July 2, 2016.
