= The Cullman Times =

Newspaper in Alabama, U.S.

- Type: Weekly newspaper
- Format: Broadsheet
- Owner: Carpenter Media Group
- Editor: Amy Henderson
- Founded: 1901 (as Cullman Democrat)
- Headquarters: 300 Fourth Avenue S.E. Cullman, Alabama 35055; United States
- Website: cullmantimes.com

The Cullman Times is a weekly newspaper published in Cullman, Alabama. It is owned by Carpenter Media Group.

== History ==
The Cullman Times is the successor to the Cullman Democrat (1901), the Cullman Banner (1937), and the Cullman Times Democrat (1954).

Hollinger sold the newspaper in 1998 to CNHI, LLC.

In April 2020, The North Jefferson News of nearby Gardendale was merged with The Cullman Times by CNHI as part of a chain-wide downsizing. The Times devoted one page of its Wednesday edition to news printed under the NJN banner, and sent this edition to remaining subscribers in Gardendale and surrounding areas. However, with no reporters remaining in the Gardendale area to cover news there, almost all North Jefferson News subscribers soon cancelled. The Wednesday edition's page was discontinued in May 2020. As of February 2024, the NJN website still redirects to a page on the Times website, though the content had not been updated since May 2020. When the Times was sold in 2024, the page was discontinued.

In May 2024, CNHI sold the Times and two sister newspapers in Athens and Pell City, plus seven other newspapers to Carpenter Media Group, a chain based in Mississippi with newspapers throughout the United States and Canada.

On October 30, 2024, print frequency was changed from four days per week to one, Wednesday.
