= Alabama's 23rd Senate district =

Alabama's 23rd State Senate district
Senator
Robert Stewart; D–Selma
- Demographics: 39.7% White; 56.9% Black; 1.0% Hispanic; 0.5% Asian
- Population (2022): 140,830

Alabama's 23rd Senate district is one of 35 districts in the Alabama Senate. The district has been represented by Robert Stewart since 2022.

== Geography ==
Election	Map	Counties in District
2026; 2022		Butler, Clarke, Conecuh, Dallas, Lowndes, Monroe, Perry, Wilcox
2018		Butler, Conecuh, Dallas, Lowndes, Perry, Wilcox, portions of Marengo, Monroe
2014		Butler, Dallas, Lowndes, Perry, Wilcox, portions of Clarke, Conecuh, Marengo, Monroe, Washington
2010; 2006; 2002		Dallas, Wilcox, portions of Autauga, Clarke, Conecuh, Lowndes, Marengo, Monroe, Perry

== Election history ==
=== Elections in the 2020s ===
Alabama Senate election, 2022: Senate District 23
Party	Candidate	Votes	%	±%
Democratic	Robert Stewart	25,953	53.39	−12.14
Republican	Michael Nimmer	21,682	44.60	+44.60
Libertarian	Portia Shepherd	959	1.97	+1.97
Write-in		18	0.04	-0.15
Majority		4,271	8.79	−22.46
Turnout		48,612		
Democratic hold				

=== Elections in the 2010s ===
Alabama Senate election, 2018: Senate District 23
Party	Candidate	Votes	%	±%
Democratic	Malika Sanders-Fortier	30,193	65.53	−32.08
Independent	Mark Story	15,796	34.28	+34.28
Write-in		88	0.19	-2.20
Majority		14,397	31.25	−63.96
Turnout		46,077		
Democratic hold				

Alabama Senate election, 2014: Senate District 23
Party	Candidate	Votes	%	±%
Democratic	Henry Sanders (Incumbent)	29,306	97.61	−0.06
Write-in		719	2.39	+0.06
Majority		28,587	95.21	−0.13
Turnout		30,025		
Democratic hold				

Alabama Senate election, 2010: Senate District 23
Party	Candidate	Votes	%	±%
Democratic	Henry Sanders (Incumbent)	30,322	97.67	+32.05
Write-in		724	2.33	+2.26
Majority		29,598	95.34	+64.04
Turnout		31,046		
Democratic hold				

=== Elections in the 2000s ===
Alabama Senate election, 2006: Senate District 23
Party	Candidate	Votes	%	±%
Democratic	Henry Sanders (Incumbent)	24,142	65.62	−4.91
Republican	Bob Duke	12,626	34.32	+34.32
Write-in		25	0.07	-0.29
Majority		11,516	31.30	−10.11
Turnout		36,793		
Democratic hold				

Alabama Senate election, 2002: Senate District 23
Party	Candidate	Votes	%	±%
Democratic	Henry Sanders (Incumbent)	26,361	70.53	−27.14
Libertarian	Richard Motes	10,882	29.11	+29.11
Write-in		135	0.36	-1.97
Majority		15,479	41.41	−53.93
Turnout		37,378		
Democratic hold				

=== Elections in the 1990s ===
Alabama Senate election, 1998: Senate District 23
Party	Candidate	Votes	%	±%
Democratic	Henry Sanders (Incumbent)	25,511	97.67	+36.70
Write-in		609	2.33	+2.33
Majority		24,902	95.34	+63.30
Turnout		26,120		
Democratic hold				

Alabama Senate election, 1994: Senate District 23
Party	Candidate	Votes	%	±%
Democratic	Henry Sanders (Incumbent)	19,392	60.97	−9.00
Independent	R. Sweatt	9,200	28.92	+28.92
Independent	H. Curl	3,215	10.11	+10.11
Majority		10,192	32.04	−7.93
Turnout		31,807		
Democratic hold				

Alabama Senate election, 1990: Senate District 23
Party	Candidate	Votes	%	±%
Democratic	Henry Sanders (Incumbent)	24,303	69.97	−30.03
Republican	Walt Williams	10,420	30.00	+30.00
Write-in		8	0.02	+0.02
Majority		13,883	39.97	−60.03
Turnout		34,731		
Democratic hold				

=== Elections in the 1980s ===
Alabama Senate election, 1986: Senate District 23
Party	Candidate	Votes	%	±%
Democratic	Henry Sanders (Incumbent)	24,685	100.00	+29.19
Majority		24,685	100.00	+58.38
Turnout		24,685		
Democratic hold				

Alabama Senate election, 1983: Senate District 23
Party	Candidate	Votes	%	±%
Democratic	Henry Sanders	20,031	70.81	−13.90
Republican	John Peel	8,257	29.19	+20.04
Write-in		1	0.00	+0.00
Majority		11,774	41.62	−33.94
Turnout		28,289		
Democratic hold				

Alabama Senate election, 1982: Senate District 23
Party	Candidate	Votes	%	±%
Democratic	Foy Covington Jr.	23,928	84.71	
Republican	Chris Bence	2,584	9.15	
NDPA	W. D. Johnston	1,734	6.14	
Majority		21,344	75.56	
Turnout		28,246		
Democratic hold				

== District officeholders ==
Senators take office at midnight on the day of their election.

- Robert Stewart (2022–present)
- Malika Sanders-Fortier (2018–2022)
- Henry Sanders (1983–2018)
- Foy Covington Jr. (1982–1983)
- Mike Weeks (1978–1982)
- T. Dudley Perry (1974–1978)
- James S. Clark (1966–1974)
- Neil Metcalf (1962–1966)
- Rufus Barnett (1958–1962)
- Neil Metcalf (1954–1958)
