= Lynneice Washington =

Jefferson County Bessemer Cutoff District Attorney 2017–Present

Lynneice O. Washington

District Attorney of Jefferson County, Alabama, Bessemer Division
- Incumbent
- Assumed office January 16, 2017
- Preceded by: Bill Veitch

Presiding Judge of the Bessemer Municipal Court
- In office February, 2011 – December, 2016

Personal details
- Born: December 27, 1967 (age 58) Birmingham, Alabama
- Party: Democratic
- Education: Auburn University at Montgomery (BA); Miles College (JD)

Lynneice Washington is an American lawyer. In 2016, she was elected district attorney assigned to the Bessemer Cutoff District (Alabama) of the 10th Judicial Circuit. She is the first Black woman district attorney in the state of Alabama.

== Early life ==
Washington was born in Birmingham, Alabama, and graduated from A. H. Parker High School. Early on, she was interested in criminal justice, and despite her mother's attempts to persuade her to become a nurse or a teacher, she set her sights on going to law school. Being a lawyer "just wasn't one of those things that a lot of Black people, particularly in our family, had as a career path," Washington said. "My mother looked at that like an impossibility." She graduated from Auburn University at Montgomery and Miles Law School before working as a Defense Attorney.

== Legal career ==
In 2010, during a campaign for a district judgeship, Washington was diagnosed with Breast cancer. She had resigned from a previous position as Assistant District Attorney in order to focus on the campaign. She recovered and is now a breast cancer survivor, but lost the election. In February 2011, she was appointed presiding judge over the Bessemer District Municipal Court. Washington ran in 2016 and won the November General Election on the Democratic Party ticket for the Jefferson County Bessemer Cutoff District by only 299 votes, beating her opponent, Bill Veitch, the incumbent District Attorney who ran on the Republican Party ticket.

== Stance on Issues ==
=== Death Penalty ===
DA Washington is opposed to the death penalty, and campaigned on that issue. After being elected, she told Vice.com that "Among other initiatives, she plans to beef up the convictions integrity unit that probes possible wrongful convictions, launch a citizen-police advisory board, and divert low-level offenders from prison by creating alternatives to incarceration."

=== Misdemeanor Marijuana Arrests ===
Washington has indicated that she is seeking to end arrests for misdemeanor marijuana offenses. "It is no secret that Jefferson County, like others around the country, is plagued with overcrowded jails," Washington stated in a press release. "Now that the Jefferson County, Bessemer jail is closed for renovations, the need to address overcrowding is even more urgent." Washington has stated that she is working to implement a procedure she calls the "Big Ticket program", under which misdemeanor offenses such as simple marijuana possession, possession of drug paraphernalia and harassment would no longer require an arrest.

== Notable Cases ==
=== Marshae Jones ===
In early 2019, Marshae Jones was indicted by a grand jury on charges of manslaughter, after the death of the fetus she was carrying after being shot after an altercation. Jones was accused of starting the altercation which led to the shooting. Washington ceased her attempt to prosecute the case as District Attorney. She said in a news conference: "After viewing the facts of this case and the applicable state law I have determined that it is not in the best interest of justice to pursue prosecution of Ms. Jones on the manslaughter charge for which she was indicted by the grand jury. Therefore, I am dismissing this case and no further legal action will be taken against Ms. Jones in this matter."
