= Henry Sanders (politician) =

American politician

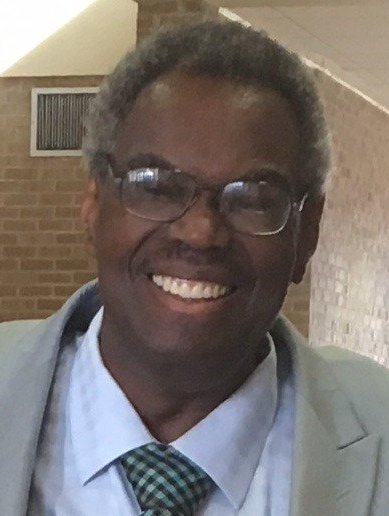

Member of the Alabama Senate from the 23rd district
- In office 1983–2018
- Succeeded by: Malika Sanders-Fortier

Personal details
- Born: October 28, 1942 (age 83) Baldwin County, Alabama, U.S.
- Party: Democratic
- Spouse: Faya Ora Rose Touré
- Children: 3, including Malika
- Education: Talladega College (BA); Harvard University (JD)

Henry "Hank" Sanders (born October 28, 1942) is an American attorney and politician who served as a member of the Alabama Senate from 1983 to 2018. He is married to Faya Ora Rose Touré.

He is the longest-serving chair of a legislative budget committee in Alabama, having first been named to chair of the Senate Finance & Taxation Committee in January 1996 and serving in it for four consecutive terms.

== Early life and education ==
Hank Sanders is the second of 13 children born to Ola Mae and Sam Sanders of Baldwin County, Alabama. He first received his nickname "The Rock" by his mother because of his solid, steady and reliable nature, and that nickname has been adopted as a slogan in his political campaigns for the Alabama Senate. He graduated from Douglasville High School, Talladega College and Harvard Law School, established a law practice (his own firm, Chestnut, Sanders, Sanders, and Pettaway), and served as the first African American State Senator from the Alabama Black Belt.

At the age of twelve, Sanders was inspired to become a lawyer after reading about Thurgood Marshall in a magazine article. Hank Sanders graduated near the top of his high school class in 1960 and college class in 1967; winning the Catherine Wardell Award after his freshman year as the "Student who contributed most to Talladega College the previous year". He received a special scholarship to Boston University for his junior year and Harvard Summer School after his sophomore year. He attended Harvard Law School on a Felix Frankfurter Scholarship "for poor young men who show great promise" and served as President of Harvard Black Law Students Association. In 2008, he received an Honorary Doctorate of Humane Letters from Talladega College.

== Career ==
=== Legal career ===
After law school, Sanders won a Ford Foundation Fellowship that sent him to Africa for a year and a Reginald Heber Smith fellowship that sent him to Huntsville, Alabama to work for the poor with Legal Services. In 1971, Hank began Chestnut, Sanders, Sanders, and Pettaway, P.C., at one time the largest Black law firm in Alabama and one of the largest in the country. His law practice has been one of service helping poor and Black people save their lands, protecting Constitutional rights of citizens, incorporating new towns and building strong sensitive governmental institutions.

As a community activist, he helped found or build many organizations including Alabama New South Coalition, where he currently serves as President Emeritus; 21st Century Youth Leadership Movement; Alabama Lawyers Association; Black Belt Human Resources; The National Voting Rights Museum and Institute; C.A.R.E. (Coalition of Alabamians Reforming Education); the Slavery and Civil War Museum, and many others. In 2007, Sanders received the Federation of Southern Cooperatives Estelle Witherspoon Lifetime Achievement Award for his outstanding work over a lifetime.

=== Alabama Senate ===
Hank Sanders was first elected to the Alabama State Senate in 1983 and has championed issues pertaining to education, children, health, women, and removing sales tax from food. He served as Chairman of the powerful Finance and Taxation Education Committee; selected as Outstanding Legislator by the Alabama Legislative Black Caucus; voted a finalist in the Legislator of the Year Award by his fellow senators, and received a 1999 Nation Builder Award from the National Caucus of Black State Legislators. As part of his accountability, Sanders writes a weekly column entitled "Senate Sketches" which is published widely. He has three weekly radio programs: Sunday School Lesson, Radio Education, and Law Lessons.

Sanders received attention for a robocall he recorded in 2010 warning of a possibility of "going back to the cotton fields of Jim Crow days" in the 2010 Alabama elections. He said he was "mad as hell" and did not want to go back in time in Alabama.

=== Author ===
Sanders wrote and published a novel, Death of a Fat Man, in 2004. In his novel, Hank shares the pain, suffering, and triumphs of struggles with obesity and imminent death. The 420-page book is written in vignettes, framed as short letters from an obese grandfather to a four-year-old granddaughter already showing signs of obesity. When Sanders started writing the book he could hardly walk. Even the short distance from the senate chamber to his office in the State House, or from his Selma law office to the parking lot, were extremely difficult. While he continued to struggle with arthritis after the publication of the novel, he moved around better and subsequently went through a double knee replacement surgery. The surgery, performed at the Kirklin Clinic at the University of Alabama in Birmingham in 2008, was successful, and Sanders now walks two miles daily.

In addition to authoring his novel, Death of a Fat Man, Sanders is working another book, The Gift of Struggle. He speaks widely, especially to youth.

== Personal life ==
He is married to Faya Ora Rose Touré, formerly Rose M. Sanders, and they have three children. He is a member and official Sunday School Reviewer of the Calvary Missionary Baptist Church in Selma.
