= Mahala Ashley Dickerson =

American lawyer and civil rights advocate

- Born: Mahala Ashley; October 12, 1912; Montgomery County, Alabama, U.S.
- Died: February 19, 2007 (aged 94); Wasilla, Alaska, U.S.
- Resting place: Wasilla, Alaska
- Citizenship: American
- Education: Fisk University; Howard University School of Law
- Occupation: Lawyer
- Spouse(s): Henry Dickerson (m. 1938–1939); Frank R. Beckwith (m. 1951–ca. 1958)
- Children: Alfred Dickerson, John Dickerson, and Henri Christophe "Chris" Dickerson
- Parent(s): Hattie (Moss) and John Augustine Ashley
- Awards: Margaret Brent Women Lawyers of Achievement honoree (1995)

Mahala Ashley Dickerson (October 12, 1912 – February 19, 2007) was an American lawyer and civil rights advocate for women and minorities. In 1948 she became the first African American female attorney admitted to the Alabama State Bar; in 1951 she was the second African American woman admitted to the Indiana bar; and in 1959 she was Alaska's first African American attorney. In 1983 Dickerson was the first African American to be elected president of the National Association of Women Lawyers. Her long legal career also helped to pave the way for other women attorneys. In 1995 the American Bar Association named her a Margaret Brent Women Lawyers of Achievement honoree.

== Early life and education ==
Mahala Ashley was born in rural Montgomery County, Alabama, on October 12, 1912, to Hattie (Moss) and John Augustine Ashley. Her father was the owner of a general store. Her siblings included two sisters, Erna and Harriette. Ashley grew up in Alabama on a plantation her father inherited. She was inspired to become a lawyer when a lawyer helped her aunt receive monthly compensation payments after her uncle fell down an elevator shaft.

Ashley attended Montgomery Industrial School for Girls (Miss White's School), a private school in Montgomery, where she met Rosa Parks, her lifelong friend who would become an activist in the civil rights movement. In 1935, Ashley graduated cum laude with a degree in sociology from Fisk University in Nashville, Tennessee.

Following her divorce from her first husband, Henry Dickerson, in 1939, Mahala Ashley enrolled at the Howard University School of Law in Washington, D.C. She graduated cum laude and was one of four women to graduate in her class of 1948.

== Marriage and family ==
Mahala Ashley married Henry Dickerson in 1938, but they divorced the following year. The Dickersons were the parents of triplet sons: Alfred, John and Henri Christophe "Chris" (who became a well-known professional bodybuilder).

In 1951 Mahala Dickerson married Frank R. Beckwith, an Indianapolis attorney, and relocated with her three sons to Indianapolis, Indiana. In 1958, after her marriage to Beckwith ended in divorce, Dickerson moved to Alaska. The couple had no children together. In 1960 Beckwith became the first African American to run as a candidate for President of the United States in a major-party primary when he ran in Indiana's Republican presidential primary. He also ran in Indiana's Republican presidential primary in 1964.

== Career ==
=== Legal career ===
After graduating from law school, Dickerson returned to Alabama to practice law. In 1948 she became the first African-American woman to be admitted to the Alabama State Bar. Dickerson established offices in Montgomery and Tuskegee, Alabama, where she practiced law for the next three years.

In 1951, following her marriage to Frank Beckwith, Dickerson moved to Indianapolis, Indiana, and became the second black woman to be admitted to the Indiana bar. Dickerson and Beckwith practiced together for a year before she opened her own law office in Indianapolis.She was especially interested labor and civil rights issues. In 1953, for example, Dickerson petitioned the Public Service Commission to request that the commissioners deny approval of a local transportation company's requests for fare increases until the company agreed to discontinue what she argued were its discriminatory practices against bus drivers and trolley operators.

In 1958, after working as an attorney in Alabama and Indiana, she took a vacation to Alaska and decided to move there with her sons. Dickerson established a homestead of 160 acres (65 hectares), making her Alaska's first female black homesteader. When she passed the Alaska bar exam, she became the first African American attorney and one of only a few women practicing law in the state. Dickerson established a law practice an Anchorage in 1959. One of her most notable cases was an equal pay lawsuit filed on behalf of a female professor at the University of Alaska. It was one of the first cases representing women professors at an American university whose salaries were lower than their male counterparts. Dickerson initially lost the case, but the court's decision was reversed on appeal in 1975.

=== Civic and philanthropic activities ===
During her years in Indianapolis she was active in Alpha Kappa Alpha sorority, the National Bar Association, the National Lawyers Guild, Americans for Democratic Action, the Religious Society of Friends (Quakers), the YWCA and NAACP. She also served as chairman of the board of directors of the Marion County [Indiana] Colored Women's Republican Club.

== Later years ==
Dickerson remained active in her later years. In addition to serving as president of Dickerson and Gibbons, the law firm she established in Alaska, she founded Al-Acres, a charitable non-profit organization. In 1983 she was elected the first black president of the National Association of Women Lawyers. In 1984 the University of Alaska awarded her an honorary Doctor of Laws degree. The American Bar Association also recognized Dickerson for her civil rights advocacy and legal career by naming her a Margaret Brent Women Lawyers of Achievement honoree in 1995. Dickerson published her memoir, Delayed Justice for Sale, in 1998.

Throughout her long legal career Dickerson was considered an advocate for the poor and underprivileged. As she told the Anchorage Daily News, "In my life, I didn't have but two things to do. Those were to stay black and to die. I'm just not afraid to fight somebody big.... Whenever there's somebody being mistreated, if they want me, I'll help them." Dickerson continued to practice law in Alaska until she was in her early nineties, only a few years before her death in 2007.

== Death and legacy ==
Dickerson died in Wasilla, Alaska, on February 19, 2007, at the age of 94 after suffering a stroke. Dickerson is buried in a cemetery she established on her Alaska property.

In the summer of 1950, Dickerson studied with the Quakers in Wallingford, Pennsylvania. Inspired by her time there, she donated 11 acres from her homestead to the Quakers. The land is now part of the Alaska Friends Conference.

Dickerson became the first black female attorney admitted to the bar in Alabama (in 1948); the second black woman admitted to the bar in Indiana (in 1951); and Alaska's first black attorney (in 1959). She was also the first black elected as president of the National Association of Women Lawyers (in 1983). With more than fifty-years of legal experience, she also helped to pave the way for other women attorneys. According to her American Bar Association profile, Dickerson prosecuted "one of the first equal pay cases on behalf of women university professors who received less pay than their male counterparts." In 1995, the American Bar Association named Dickerson a Margaret Brent Women Lawyers of Achievement honoree, an honor also given to U.S. Supreme Court Justices Ruth Bader Ginsburg (a 1983 honoree) and Sandra Day O'Connor (an honoree in 2000), among other notable women lawyers, judges, law professors, and government leaders. Dickerson's papers are housed at the David M. Rubenstein Rare Book and Manuscript Library at Duke University in Durham, North Carolina.

== Honors and tributes ==
- Honored by the NAACP in 1982
- The Zeta Phi Beta Award for distinguished service in the field of law in 1985.
- She received the Baha’i Award for Service to Humanity in 1985.
- The University of Alaska awarded her an honorary Doctor of Laws degree in 1994.
- The American Bar Association named her a Margaret Brent Women Lawyers of Achievement honoree in 1995.
- The Alabama State Bar honored her with the Maud McLure Kelly Award in 2006.
- She was inducted into the Alaska Women's Hall of Fame in 2009.
- She was inducted into the Alabama State Bar Lawers Hall of Fame in 2017.
- She was inducted into the Alabama Women's Hall of Fame in 2023
- The National Association of Women Lawyers awards the M. Ashley Dickerson Diversity Award annually. Past honorees include Sherrilyn Ifill (2020), Wilhelmina Wright (2017), JoAnne A. Epps (2015), Debra L. Lee (2010), and Deborah Batts (2008)
- She received her Phi Beta Kappa key 51 years after graduating, as it was not allowed at black colleges when she graduated.

== Electoral history ==
Dickerson ran for a seat in the Alaska House of Representatives in 1968.

1968 Alaska State Senate District 8 general election (for 14-seat multi-member district)
| Party | Candidate | Votes | % |
|---|---|---|---|
| Democratic | Gene Guess (incumbent) | 16,624 | |
| Republican | Ron L. Rettig | 16,527 | |
| Democratic | Wendell P. Kay | 16,448 | |
| Democratic | Chuck Sassara (incumbent) | 15,386 | |
| Democratic | Richard L. McVeigh | 15,301 | |
| Democratic | Chancy Croft | 15,012 | |
| Republican | Helen D. Beirne | 14,243 | |
| Republican | John M. Sweet | 14,209 | |
| Democratic | Genie Chance | 14,175 | |
| Democratic | Earl D. Hillstrand | 14,098 | |
| Republican | Stanley P. Cornelius | 14,065 | |
| Republican | Tom Fink (incumbent) | 13,520 | |
| Republican | Jess Harris (incumbent) | 13,520 | |
| Democratic | John A. Schwamm | 12,845 | |
| Democratic | Edward G. Barber | 12,820 | |
| Democratic | Carl F. Lottsfeldt | 12,783 | |
| Democratic | William J. Moran (incumbent) | 12,745 | |
| Republican | Ken Sheppard | 12,643 | |
| Republican | Keith M. Lesh | 12,594 | |
| Republican | Ward Gay | 12,557 | |
| Democratic | Homer Moseley | 12,382 | |
| Democratic | Orville Lake | 12,316 | |
| Republican | Jack R. Simpson (incumbent) | 12,309 | |
| Republican | Don Smith (incumbent) | 12,258 | |
| Republican | Moose Moore (incumbent) | 12,168 | |
| Republican | Bill Wiggins (incumbent) | 11,633 | |
| Republican | Jim Dodson | 11,018 | |
| Democratic | M. Ashley Dickerson | 10,954 | |
| Total votes | | ___ | |
| | number of persons voting | 31,193 | |

== Selected published works ==
- Delayed Justice for Sale (1998), a memoir
- "Jet-Propelled into the Law: Mahala Ashley Dickerson" (1998), profile in Rebels in Law: Voices in History of Black Women Lawyers (1998)

== See also ==
- List of first women lawyers and judges in Alaska

== Sources ==
- Duke University Libraries. Guide to the Mahala Ashley Dickerson Papers, 1958-2007 and undated. Durham, North Carolina: Duke University.
- Goldberg, Stephanie B. (Summer 2005). "Honoring the Unsung Heroes: Margaret Brent Awards Celebrate 15th Anniversary". American Bar Association.
- Harmon, David (May 23, 2011). "Mahala Ashley Dickerson". Encyclopedia of Alabama. Alabama Humanities Foundation.
- "M. Ashley Dickerson Diversity Award Recipients". National Association of Women Lawyers.
- "Mahala Ashley Dickerson (1912-2007)". BlackPast. 2 April 2014.
- "Mahala Ashley Dickerson: Partner, Dickerson & Gibbons, Anchorage, Alaska" (PDF). American Bar Association.
- O'Malley, Julia (February 21, 2007). "Pioneer Alaska lawyer Dickerson dies at 94". Anchorage Daily News. Anchorage, Alaska: McClatchy NewspapersNewspapers: A1.
- Schwier, Ryan and Ravay Smith (February 23, 2015). "'Thirst For Justice': Indiana's Pioneering Black Lawyers". Indiana Legal Archive.
