= Thomas Logan Jones =

American jurist and law professor (1931–2017)

Thomas Logan Jones (1931–2017) was an American jurist and law professor at the University of Alabama School of Law. Jones was one of the chief drafters of the Uniform Probate Code.
