= Aquilla A. Griffith =

American politician (1878–1947)

Aquilla A. Griffith (February 22, 1878–1947) was a lawyer and politician in Alabama. He served in the Alabama Senate. He also served as solicitor for Cullman County, Alabama. He was a Democrat.

Born in Blountsville, Alabama, he graduated from Cumberland University. He also graduated from Blount College.

In 1903, Griffith's law library burned in a train depot fire. In 1904 he married Lillie Johnson. He defeated incumbent James Edwin Horton.

He was a member of the Masons and a Red Man. He was also an Odd Fellow. Griffith died in 1947 at the age of 69.

== See also ==
- Annie Lola Price
