= Frank R. Beckwith =

African American lawyer and politician

- Born: December 11, 1904; Indianapolis, Indiana, U.S.
- Died: August 24, 1965 (aged 60); Indianapolis, Indiana, U.S.
- Citizenship: American
- Occupation: Lawyer
- Political party: Republican Party
- Spouses: Mahala Ashley Dickerson (m. 1951–ca. 1958); Bobbie Collins Goolsby (m. 1964–1965)

Frank Roscoe Beckwith (December 11, 1904 – August 24, 1965) was a lawyer, civil rights activist, and politician from Indianapolis, Indiana. In 1960 he became the first African American to run as a candidate for President of the United States in a major-party primary.

== Early life and education ==
Frank Roscoe Beckwith was born in Indianapolis, Indiana, on December 11, 1904, to former slaves. He attended Indianapolis Public Schools, Numbers 37 and 26, before graduating from Arsenal Technical High School in 1921. Attorneys Sumner A. Clancy and Asa J. Smith tutored Beckwith in the study of law.

== Career ==
Before he became a successful attorney and civil rights activist, Beckwith published the Indianapolis Tribune for a brief time in the 1920s. He joined the Republican party in 1928. From 1929 to 1933 Beckwith served as director of welfare and safety for the Indiana Industrial Board. In 1935 he drafted and lobbied the Indiana General Assembly to secure a law that provided free transportation for Indiana school children who had to attend public schools outside of their home school districts.

Beckwith established his law office on Indiana Avenue, the cultural and commercial hub of the city's African American community at that time, and made several unsuccessful bids for political offices. In 1936 he ran for a seat as a state representative in the Indiana General Assembly, and in 1938 for a seat on the Indianapolis City-County Council, but lost both elections.

Beckwith remained active in Indianapolis civic affairs during the 1940s. He worked to open the basketball tournament to all public and parochial high schools in Indiana, ending racial segregation in the state tournaments. Beckwith was also involved in efforts to secure laws to increase hiring African-American police officers, construct a new community building at Douglass Park in 1943, and maintain Lockefield Gardens as affordable housing for low income families. In 1943, the year he was admitted to practice before the bar of the U.S. Supreme Court, Beckwith gave a radio address, "The Negro Lawyer and the War," that the American Bar Association subsequently published in book form.

From 1951 to 1958 Beckwith was a public defender in the Marion County, Indiana, criminal court system. In 1953, Beckwith, as president of the Yankee Doodle Civic Foundation, and Mahala Ashley Dickerson, an Indianapolis attorney who was also his first wife, petitioned the Public Service Commission of Indiana, which resulted in an order to deny a fare increase for the Indianapolis Railways until it discontinued what Dickerson argued was racial discrimination in the employment of its bus and trolley operators. Beckwith also addressed the Indianapolis City Council in 1953, seeking pay raises for employees and personnel of the city's General Hospital (later renamed Wishard Hospital).

In addition to his law practice, Beckwith remained active in Republican Party politics. He served as an Indianapolis precinct committeeman and as a delegate to several of the Indiana Republican Party's state conventions. In 1956 Beckwith served as Indiana's urban coordinator for President Dwight D. Eisenhower's reelection campaign, and elected an alternate delegate from Indiana's Eleventh Congressional District to the Republican National Convention in San Francisco, California. From 1957 to 1961 Beckwith served as a member of the Indiana Commission on Aging and the Aged.

Beckwith lost several races for local, state, and national political offices. In 1959 Beckwith lost his bid for a seat on the city council representing the second district as an independent candidate. In 1960 Beckwith became the first African American to run for President of the United States in a major-party primary. He was one of six candidates in Indiana's Republican primary and received 20,000 votes, roughly equivalent to one-third of one percent of the Republican votes cast in the primary race. Richard M. Nixon was the winner of the Indiana primary and eventually became the Republican Party's presidential nominee. Beckwith also ran unsuccessfully in 1964 for Indianapolis mayor and in the Republican Presidential Primary in Indiana. Barry Goldwater won the Indiana Republican presidential primary and later became the party's nominee. According to March 1964 report in Jet, Beckwith urged the Republican Party to "re-evaluate and strengthen its position with labor as well as minorities" and blamed the persecution of African Americans and the denial of voting rights in the South as the cause for African Americans becoming reliant on welfare in the Midwest cities of Chicago, Indianapolis, and Detroit.

== Personal life ==
In 1951 Beckwith married Mahala Ashley Dickerson, a lawyer and civil rights advocate from Alabama. In 1948 Dickerson became the first African American female attorney admitted to the Alabama State Bar; in 1951 she became the second black female attorney to be admitted to the bar in Indiana. Dickerson and Beckwith practiced together for a year before she opened her own law office in Indianapolis. In 1958, following her divorce from Beckwith, she moved to Alaska, where she was the first African American attorney and one of only a few women practicing law in the state. Dickerson died in Wasilla, Alaska, on February 19, 2007, at the age of ninety-four. Dickerson has triplet sons from an earlier marriage.

In 1964 Beckwith married Bobbie Collins Goolsby in Chicago, Illinois. The former educatorin the Indianapolis Public Schools was president of the Indianapolis-Marion County Public Library Board, a founding member and president of the Board of Directors of Martin University, and a recipient of the Sagamore of the Wabash award (1985). She died in 2004 at the age of eighty-four in a fire that destroyed her Indianapolis home.

== Death and legacy ==
Beckwith died from complications of peritonitis (an abdominal disease) in Indianapolis on August 24, 1965, at the age of sixty. He is buried in Crown Hill Cemetery in Indianapolis.

Beckwith is best known as a lawyer, civic leader, social activist in the early decades of the twentieth century. In 1960 he ran in the Indiana Republican primary, becoming the first African American to run in a major-party presidential primary. He also ran in the Indiana Republican Party presidential primary in 1964, but did not win either contest. Beckwith's legacies as a civil rights activist in Indiana include legislation that he helped draft to provide free transportation to Indiana's school-aged children and his efforts to integrate the city, including hiring more minorities on the city's police force and in its hospitals. Beckwith also helped to open the state's high school basketball tournaments to all of Indiana's public and parochial high schools, ending racial segregation in the state tournaments.

== Honors and tributes ==
- Named to The Indianapolis Recorder's Roll of Honor in 1953.
- Recipient of the African Methodist Church's Richard Allen Award in 1954.
- Indianapolis's Salem Village Park was renamed in Beckwith's honor in 1970.
