= Michael W. Jackson =

American attorney (born 1963)

Michael Wayne Jackson (born November 18, 1963, in Fayetteville, Tennessee) is an American attorney. He is currently an Alabama district attorney. He received his undergraduate degree at Centre College with a double major in economics/management and government in 1985. He received his Juris Doctor in 1988 from Florida State University College of Law.

Jackson became a Selma, Alabama Municipal Judge in 1995 and served until 1998. In 2004, he became the first African American district attorney elected to the 4th Judicial Circuit. At that time, he was only the second African American to serve as district attorney in Alabama. While in office, Jackson has prosecuted several notable cases, including the Alabama Church Arson Cases in Bibb County, Alabama, the Alabama Artifacts Case, and the case of former state trooper James Bonard Fowler, who was charged with the murder of Jimmie Lee Jackson.
