= Faya Ora Rose Touré =

American civil rights activist and lawyer

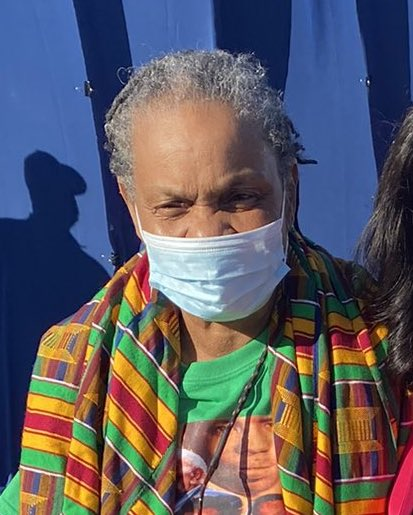
- Faya Ora Rose Touré in March 2021

Personal details
- Born: Rose M. Gaines; May 20, 1945 (age 80) Salisbury, North Carolina, U.S.
- Spouse: Hank Sanders
- Occupation: Attorney, judge, activist

Faya Ora Rose Touré, born Rose M. Gaines, (born May 20, 1945) is an American civil rights activist and lawyer who was Alabama’s first black woman judge. Henry Sanders is her husband.

== Personal life ==
Touré was born on May 20, 1945, in Salisbury, North Carolina to Rev. D. A. Gaines and Ora Lee Gaines. She was graduated from George Clem High School in 1962. She was graduated summa cum laude from Johnson C. Smith University in Charlotte, North Carolina in 1966 and then from Harvard Law School in 1969.

Born Rose Gaines, Touré abandoned her "slave name" in 2002, and took a new name in honor of Ahmed Sékou Touré, the first President of Guinea. She is married to Alabama State Senator Henry Sanders. Together they have three natural born children and four foster children.

She is a songwriter and playwright and hosts Faya's Fire, a weekly radio show. She is the creator of the gospel song "I'm Gonna Lift My Sister Up".

== Civil rights ==
After Harvard, Touré went to work at the National Welfare Rights Organization and the Columbia Center on Social Welfare Policy and Law. She then went to work for the Legal Services Corporation before founding the law firm of Chestnut, Sanders, Sanders, Pettaway & Campbell, LLC.

She worked on a number of high profile civil rights cases during her career. Touré worked on the case of Pigford v. Veneman, the largest civil rights case in history. She won more than $1 billion in damages from the United States Department of Agriculture for black farmers in the case. In 1982, the firm conducted a study of black land tenure and documented land loss by African Americans for the Department of the Agriculture's Emergency Land Fund.

She founded the National Voting Rights Museum, the McRae Learning Center, the Ancient Africa, Slavery and Civil War Museum, the Bridge Crossing Jubilee, the 21st Century Youth Leadership Movement, and the Black Belt Arts and Cultural Center.

== Judicial career ==
Touré became the first African-American female judge in Alabama when she was appointed as a municipal judge in 1973. She served in this position until 1977.

== See also ==
- List of first women lawyers and judges in Alabama
- List of African-American jurists
