= Alabama State Bar =

Bar association

- Type: Legal society
- Headquarters: Montgomery, AL
- Location: United States
- Members: 19,000
- Website: http://www.alabar.org/

The Alabama State Bar is the integrated (mandatory) bar association of the U.S. state of Alabama. Established in 1923, the association is governed by the 1975 Alabama Code, Title 34, Chapter 3. It is the "licensing and regulatory agency for attorneys in the State of Alabama, subject to Rules of the Alabama Supreme Court" and "has jurisdiction over the conduct of all attorneys and is charged with stimulating interest in improving the administration of justice." The bar also administers the state bar examination for those seeking to be admitted to the bar in Alabama.

The governing body of the state bar is a board of commissioners. The board is composed of at least one elected representative from each of Alabama's 41 judicial circuits. One additional commissioner is elected for each 300 members of the state bar in a circuit "who maintain their principal office in the circuit as of March of each year, subject to the requirement that no circuit is entitled to more than ten Commissioners."

The Alabama State Bar is dedicated to promoting the professional responsibility and competence of its members, improving the administration of justice and increasing the public understanding of and respect for the law.

The values that guide the state bar are: Trust, Integrity and Service. The ASB has long served a dual role as an advocate for the profession and for the public. Often it is difficult to separate these two responsibilities, but during the last few decades with the growing complexity of society and our legal system, the ASB's public role has gained both emphasis and breadth.

Since its creation as an integrated bar association, the ASB has initiated programs addressing a wide range of public concerns; from merit selection of judges to securing adequate funding for representing indigent defendants; from ensuring that non-lawyers sit on disciplinary panels to encouraging the use of mediation as an alternative method of dispute resolution. State Bar positions play an influential role in determining public and social policy in state and national forums.

The Alabama State Bar is composed principally of practicing attorneys, judges, law teachers, and non-practicing lawyers who are business executives, government officials, court administrators and so forth. It represents practitioners in specialized areas of law, as well as affiliated, law-related organizations and groups with special interests or needs.

The state bar serves as the voice of the legal practitioner in Alabama. It proposes model rules of professional responsibility (which govern the daily business and ethical practice of lawyers) for adoption by the supreme court.

== History and characteristics ==
A meeting prior to the formation of a bar association of Alabama was held in Montgomery on December 13, 1878. Afterwards, on January 15, 1879, delegates from the bar of each county met at a preliminary conference in the Hall of the House of Representatives for organizing the State Bar Association. At this conference, ending January 20, 1879, the constitution and by-laws of the Alabama State Bar Association were adopted and officers elected to serve until the first annual meeting set for the first Tuesday in December 1879.

W. L. Bragg of Montgomery was elected the first president of the Alabama State Bar Association. Thus, the state bar was founded and on February 12, 1879, an Act incorporating the Alabama State Bar Association was approved by the governor.

On December 4, 1879, the first annual meeting of the bar was held in Montgomery and E. W. Pettus of Dallas County was elected president. At the suggestion of Thomas Goode Jones of Montgomery, at the annual meeting in 1881, a committee was created and charged with the responsibility of adopting a code of legal ethics for the bar, the first code of legal ethics in the country. The Alabama Code of Ethics was adopted by the bar at its annual meeting in 1887 and was the foundation of the canons of ethics adopted by the American Bar Association.

In 1919 Estelle Henderson was the first African American woman admitted to the state bar.

The state bar, as a voluntary body, continued in its efforts toward the improvement of the legal profession, but it was not until August 9, 1923, that the efforts of the bar culminated in the approval of an Act of the Alabama Legislature providing for the organization, regulation and government of the Alabama State Bar, thereby creating an "integrated bar" as we now know it.

As a result of this act, the first meeting of the Alabama State Bar Commission was held on January 8, 1924, when the Board of Commissioners appointed the first board of examiners and adopted rules regulating requirements for admission to practice law and governing the conduct of attorneys in Alabama.

In 1923, the legislature passed legislation integrating the Alabama State Bar Association with state government. Integration made membership in a traditionally voluntary association mandatory, thereby allowing the Alabama Supreme Court to better regulate the legal profession.

The state bar's enabling legislation appears in §§34-3-1 through 88, Code of Alabama (1975). Under this chapter and rules of the supreme court, the state bar serves a dual role. First, the state bar is the licensing and regulatory agency for lawyers in Alabama. The state bar protects the public by ensuring that lawyers who are granted licenses are not only minimally competent to practice law but also abide by the profession's ethical standards. Second, the state bar is a private association with responsibilities largely of a service nature, e.g. education, publications and improvement of the administration of justice. These activities benefit the legal profession as well as the general public.

The state bar is unlike a traditional state agency which ordinarily operates under the executive branch of government. The Supreme Court has duly noted that "members of the bar of Alabama are members of a private incorporated association."

State bar members are officers of the court irrespective of the fact that the state bar was created under the aegis of legislation. The state bar is self-funded through license fees and dues paid by its members.

Although the bar is subject to certain legislative controls relating to its fiscal operations, the Board of Bar Commissioners exercises a judicial function under state law in administering the supreme court's rules and is subject to its oversight.

For this reason, the Board of Bar Commissioners is an arm of the court. As an arm of the court, the commission's employees are non-merit employees, as are employees of the judicial branch, fulfilling responsibilities entrusted to the commission by the supreme court.

Membership in the state bar is open to lawyers admitted to practice and in good standing before the bar of Alabama as well as to members of the profession in good standing in any other state.

Approximately 25 percent of all ASB members, not counting law students, are 36 years of age or younger. The Alabama State Bar's influence today stems from both the number and diversity of its membership. Association members represent all lawyers admitted to practice in Alabama.

== Structure ==
=== Board of Bar Commissioners ===
At the present time, the Board of Bar Commissioners is composed of 72 members. A simple representational formula allows many diverse associations of lawyers within the state to be represented in this forum.

=== The executive council ===
The executive council is composed of the president, president-elect, vice president, secretary/executive director, and three members-at-large chosen from the Board of Bar Commissioners. The immediate past president is also a member of this body. All officers are elected to serve one-year terms.

=== The president ===
The president serves for one association year which begins at the close of the annual meeting (held each year in mid-July). The president and their designee are the official spokesperson in expressing policy of the association as determined by the Board of Bar Commissioners. Unless otherwise provided, the president appoints the chairs and members of standing committees and task forces of the ASB.

=== The president-elect ===
The president-elect serves a term of one association year and performs such other duties as the president may assign, or the duties of the president, should the president become disabled and unable to perform the duties of office.

=== Sections, committees, and task forces ===
The association's current structure includes 21 specialized substantive law sections, 23 standing committees and five task forces. These groups publish material dealing with their field of expertise, much of which is not available through commercial publishers. These units also sponsor conferences, seminars and institutes, monitor legislation, conduct studies and may make policy recommendations to the Board of Bar Commissioners.

=== Sections ===
Sections range in size from approximately 20 members to more than 1,000 members. Each section draws its membership from lawyers or judges with common professional interests. They operate much like "mini bar associations" with their own officers, dues schedule and committees. They address professional development, improvement of laws and continuing education in a variety of substantive law fields. The sections can and do have sub-committees which tackle specialized single legal issues that may be part of the overall Section jurisdiction. Standing Committees and Task Forces have smaller memberships, and generally focus on specific assignments or narrower issues.

== Offices ==
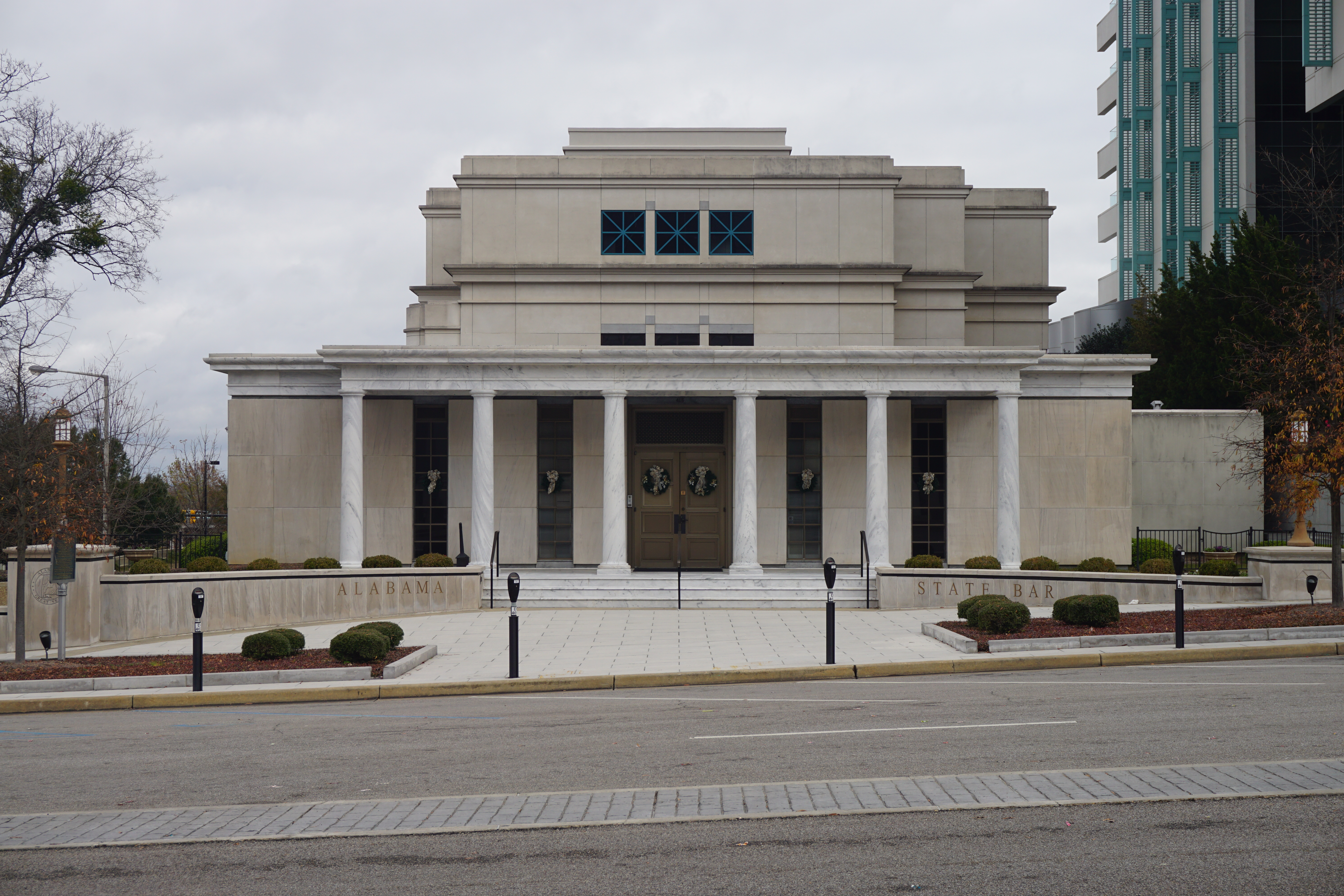
Alabama State Bar building in Montgomery

The Alabama State Bar is headquartered at 415 Dexter Avenue in Montgomery.

In 1964, pledges and donations by bar members made for a debt-free bar headquarters building with paid-for furnishings. The original building contained six offices, a library, an assembly room, and a membership file room, plus a print shop added in 1969. By 1980, the bar had outgrown the Dexter Avenue headquarters. Another building was purchased and furnished, again with donations by bar members.

The building, located at 1019 South Perry Street, across from the Governor's Mansion, was the home of the bar's Center for Professional Responsibility.

In the fall of 1992, work was completed on a $3.5 million addition to the bar headquarters building. Member donations covered a little more than a third of the cost. The addition provided 32,000 square feet (3,000 m^{2}), including space for the Center for Professional Responsibility. The original headquarters building was also refurbished and included an office for the state bar president and three conference rooms that are used by state bar committees or can be reserved for use by state bar members.

A portion of the previously unoccupied third floor of the bar addition was built out in 1999 to add office space for several of the bar's newest programs. Also, a state-of-the-art video conference room was added on the third floor, and is available for use by bar committees and sections. Attorneys may use this facility for client teleconferences and tele-depositions for a reasonable charge. A major refurbishment of the first and second floors of the facility was completed in 2002 with the addition of more parking across the street from the bar center. In 2008, additional office space was created on the third floor as part of a $626,000 build-out of that floor and renovations for the first and second floors.

The State Bar Center features various public recognitions of lawyers, judges and non-lawyers illustrating dedicated service to the profession, judicial excellence and the public service character of the legal profession. It is decorated with original works of art created by such prominent Alabama artists as Jake Waggoner, Barbara Gallagher, Russ Baxley, Roger Brown, and Nall, to cite a few examples.

The annual budget of the Association is approximately $6 million. No tax dollars are used to support bar activities. All practicing attorneys pay an annual license fee, which goes into a special trust fund. From this trust fund the Legislature makes an appropriation for the use of the Alabama State Bar.

== Alabama Lawyers Hall of Fame ==
The Alabama Lawyers Hall of Fame is an organization honoring lawyers in the US state of Alabama, located at the Alabama State Bar judicial building.

=== History ===
The idea for a Hall of Fame first appeared in the year 2000 when Montgomery attorney Terry Brown wrote State Bar President Sam Rumore with a proposal that the former supreme court building, adjacent to the state bar building and vacant at that time, should be turned into a museum memorializing the many great lawyers in the history of the State of Alabama. The implementation of the idea of an Alabama Lawyers Hall of Fame originated during the term of State Bar President Fred Gray. The committee report was approved in 2003 and the first induction took place for the year 2004.

=== Inductees ===
Name	Year of Induction	Area of Achievement	Reference
Annie Lola Price	2004		
Frank Minis Johnson	2004		
Albert J. Farrah	2004		
Arthur Davis Shores	2004		
William Douglas Arant	2005		
Oscar W. Adams	2005		
Hugo L. Black	2005		
Harry Toulmin	2005		
William Rufus King	2006		
Thomas Minott Peters	2006		
John Sparkman	2006		
Robert S. Vance	2006		
John Archibald Campbell	2007		
Howell T. Heflin	2007		
Patrick W. Richardson	2007		
Thomas G. Jones	2007		
John B. Scott	2008		
Vernon Z. Crawford	2008		
Edward M. Friend	2008		
Elisha Wolsey Peck	2008		
Francis Hutcheson Hare	2009		
James G. Birney	2009		
Michael A. Figures	2009		
Clement C. Clay	2009		
Samuel W. Pipes, III	2009		
Edgar Thomas Albritton	2010		
Henry Hitchcock	2010		
James E. Horton	2010		
Lawrence Drew Redden	2010		
Harry Seale	2010		
Roderick Beddow, Sr.	2011		
John McKinley	2011		
Nina Miglionico	2011		
Charles Morgan, Jr.	2011		
William D. Scruggs, Jr.	2011		
John A. Caddell	2012		
William Logan Martin, Jr.	2012		
Edwin Cary Page, Jr.	2012		
William James Samford	2012		
David J. Vann	2012		
Marion Augustus Baldwin	2013		
T. Massey Bedsole	2013		
William Dowdell Denson	2013		
Maud McLure Kelly	2013		
Seybourn Harris Lynne	2013		
Walter Lawrence Bragg	2014		
George Washington Lovejoy	2014		
Albert Leon Patterson	2014		
Sam C. Pointer, Jr.	2014		
Henry Bascom Steagall	2014		
Abe Berkowitz	2015		
Reuben Chapman	2015		
Martin Leigh Harrison	2015		
Holland McTyeire Smith	2015		
Frank Edward Spain	2015		
William B. Bankhead	2016		
Lister Hill	2016		
John Thomas King	2016		
James Russell McElroy	2016		
George Washington Stone	2016		
Bibb Allen	2017		
Mahala Ashley Dickerson	2017		
John Cooper Godbold	2017		
Alto Velo Lee, III	2017		
Charles Tait	2017		
Jeremiah Clemens	2018		
Carl Atwood Elliott	2018		
Robert Austin Huffaker, Sr.	2018		
Henry Upson Sims	2018		
George Peach Taylor	2018		
Clifford Judkins Durr	2019		
Broox Gray Garrett	2019		
Henry Washington Hilliard	2019		
Richard Taylor Rives	2019		
Ellene G. Winn	2019		
Cecil Howard Strawbridge	2020		
Helen Shores Lee	2020		
Henry Minor	2020		
Jane Kimbrough Dishuck	2020		
William Burton Hairston, Jr.	2020		
Charles Baker Arendall, Jr.	2021		
Jerome Alfred Cooper	2021		
Douglas Phillip Corretti	2021		
William Hooper Councill	2021		
James Oscar Sentell, Jr.	2021		
Harold Vaughan Hughston	2022		
James Taylor Jones	2022		
Arthur Alexander Madison	2022		
Clarence Frost Rhea	2022		
Janie Ledlow Shores	2022		
John Williams Walker	2023		
Ralph I. Knowles, Jr.	2023		
Thomas Logan Jones	2023		
J.L. Chestnut, Jr.	2023		
Albert Preston Brewer	2023		
Camille Cook	2024		
James O. Haley	2024		
George Washington Lane	2024		
Alex W. Newton	2024		
Louis Charles Wright	2024		
