= 2016 United States Senate elections =

- November 8, 2016 (Note: A runoff election was held in Louisiana on December 10.)
- Class 3

34 of the 100 seats in the United States Senate 51 seats needed for a majority
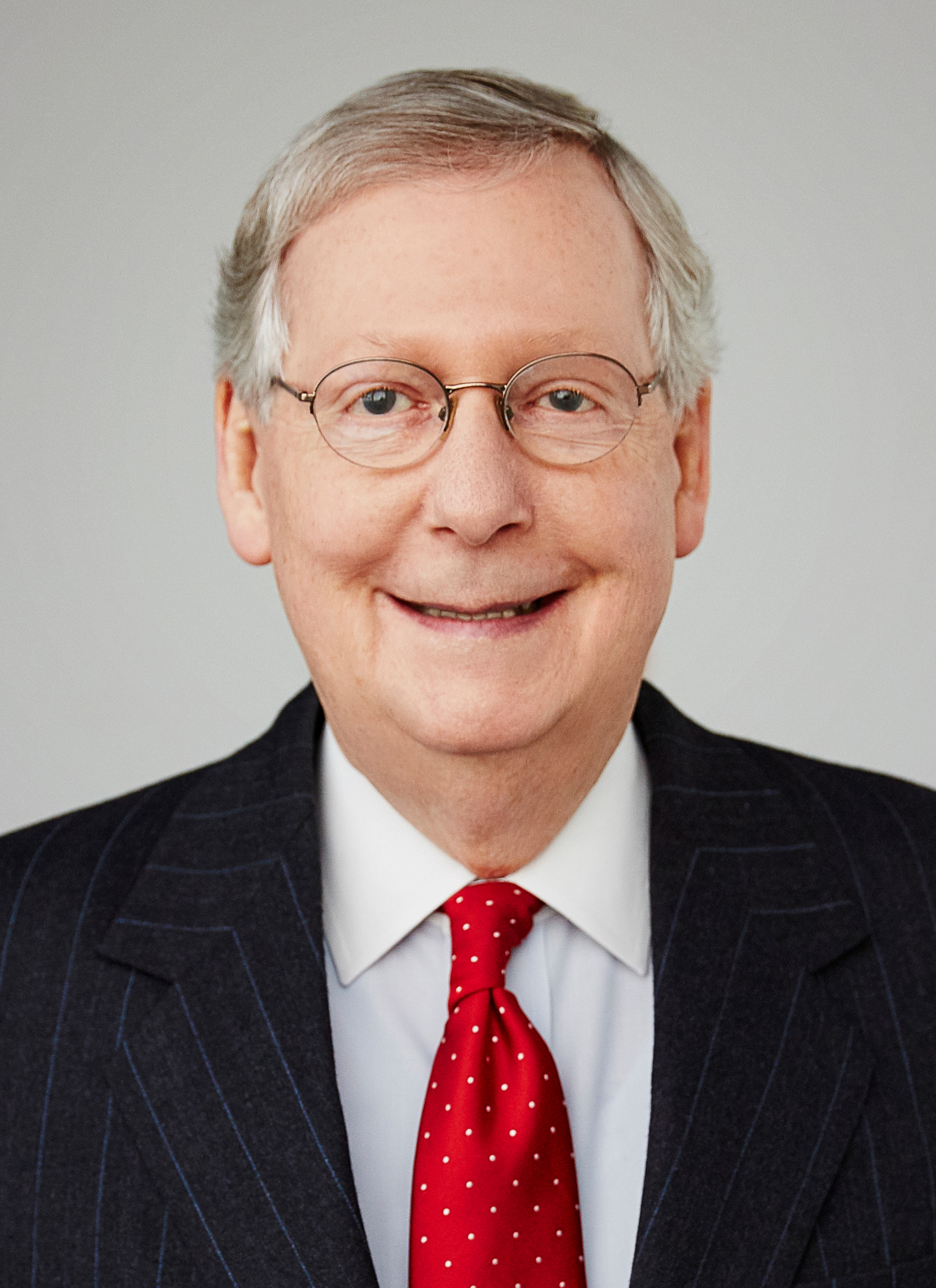

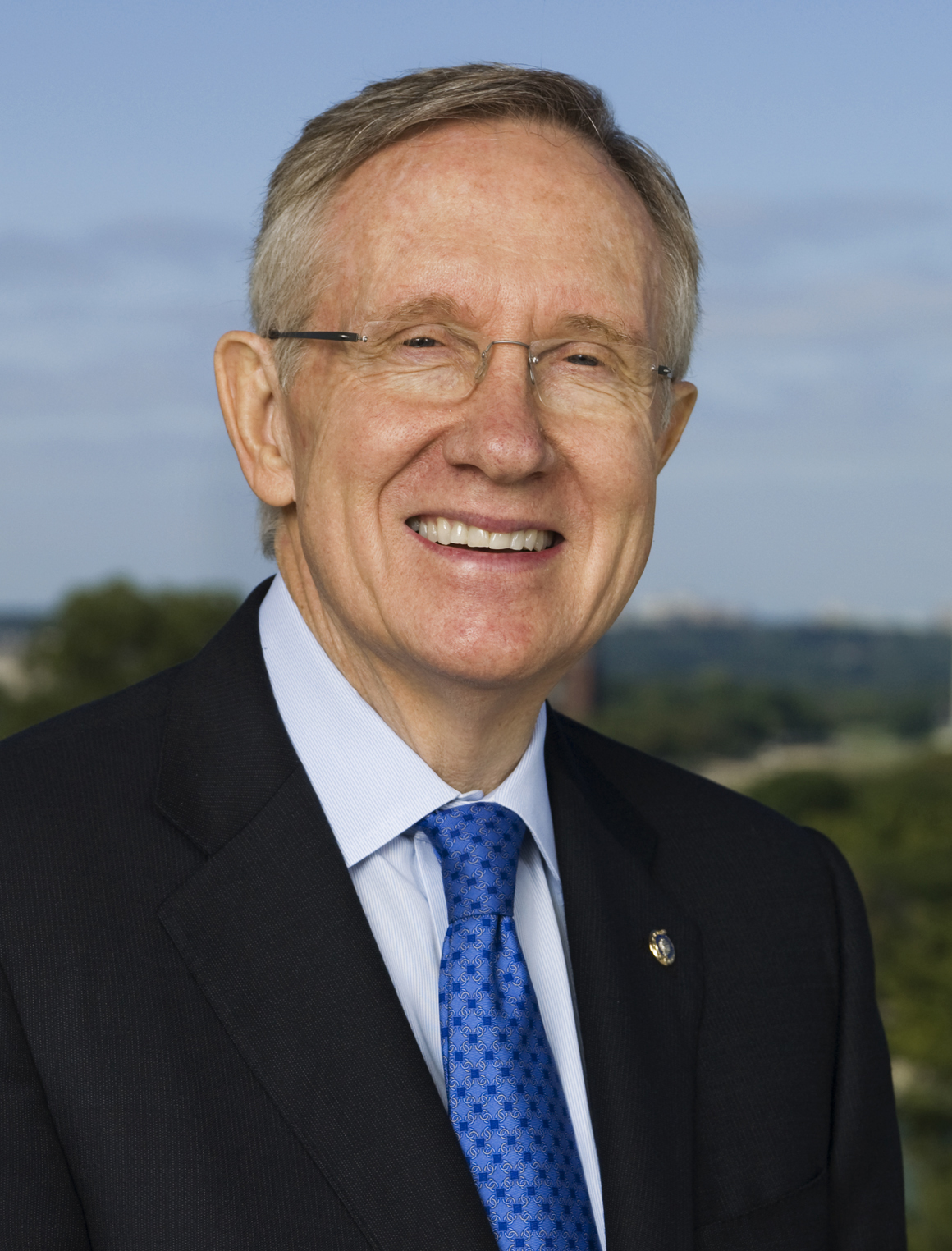
| | Majority party | Minority party |
|---|---|---|
| Leader | Mitch McConnell | Harry Reid (retired as leader) |
| Party | Republican | Democratic |
| Leader since | January 3, 2007 | January 3, 2005 |
| Leader's seat | Kentucky | Nevada |
| Seats before | 54 | 44 |
| Seats after | 52 | 46 |
| Seat change | ▼2 | ▲2 |
| Popular vote | 40,841,717 | 51,315,969 (Note: Both general election candidates in California were Democrats, having won the top two spots in the nonpartisan blanket primary, so all 12.2 million votes in California were counted for Democrats. For comparison, in 2012, the last time a Republican Senate candidate appeared on the California ballot, 12.6 million votes were cast, of which 4.7 million (38%) were cast for the Republican candidate.) |
| Percentage | 42.16% | 52.98% |
| Seats up | 24 | 10 |
| Races won | 22 | 12 |
| | Third party |
| Party | Independent |
| Seats before | 2 (Note: Both independents caucused with the Democrats.) |
| Seats after | 2 |
| Seat change | Steady |
| Popular vote | 626,763 |
| Percentage | 0.65% |
| Seats up | 0 |
| Races won | 0 |
- Results of the elections: Democratic hold Democratic gain Republican hold No election
Majority Leader before election
Mitch McConnell
Republican
Elected Majority Leader
Mitch McConnell
Republican

The 2016 United States Senate elections were held on November 8, 2016. The presidential election, House elections, 14 gubernatorial elections, and many state and local elections were held concurrently. In the elections, 34 of the 100 seats—all Class 3 Senate seats—were contested in regular elections; the winners served six-year terms until January 3, 2023. Class 3 had last been up for election in 2010 when Republicans won a net gain of six seats.

In 2016, Democrats defended 10 seats, while Republicans defended 24 seats. Republicans, having won a majority of seats in the Senate in 2014, held the Senate majority with 54 seats before this election. Although the Democrats made a net gain of two seats, Republicans retained control of the Senate for the 115th United States Congress. The two Democratic gains came from the defeats of incumbents Kelly Ayotte in New Hampshire and Mark Kirk in Illinois by Maggie Hassan and Tammy Duckworth, respectively.

Despite Republicans retaining control of the Senate, 2016 marked the first time since 1986 where Democrats made a net gain of seats in Class 3. This is also the only election cycle since the popular-vote election of senators was mandated by the 17th Amendment in 1913 that the winning party in every Senate election mirrored the winning party for their state in the presidential election. This feat had nearly been accomplished earlier in 1920, which also involved the Class 3 Senate seats, and nearly repeated in 2020; in both cases, every state, with the exception of Kentucky in 1920 and Maine in 2020, voted for the same party in the presidential election and their Senate election. In addition, this election marked the first time since 2000 in which the party in opposition to the elected or reelected presidential candidate made net gains in the Senate; both cases involved the election of a Republican president and the Democrats making gains in the Senate.

With the retirement of Harry Reid, Chuck Schumer became the Democratic leader after the elections, while Mitch McConnell retained his position as Senate Majority Leader. As of 2024, this is the last time Republicans won Senate races in Arizona and Georgia, and the last Senate election cycle where there were no special elections.

== Results summary ==
All 34 Class 3 senators were up for election in 2016; Class 3 consisted of 10 Democrats and 24 Republicans. Of the senators not up for election, 34 of the senators not up for election were Democrats, 30 senators were Republicans, and two senators were independents who caucused with the Senate Democrats.

↓
| 44 | 2 | 54 |

| Democratic | Independent | Republican |

| Parties | | | | | | | Total |
| Parties | Democratic | Republican | Independent | Libertarian | Green | Other | Total |
| Before these elections | 44 | 54 | 2 | — | — | — | 100 |
| Not up | 34 | 30 | 2 | — | — | — | 66 |
| Class 1 (2012→2018) | 23 | 8 | 2 | — | — | — | 33 |
| Class 2 (2014→2020) | 11 | 22 | 0 | — | — | — | 33 |
| Up | 10 | 24 | 0 | — | — | — | 34 |
| Class 3 (2010→2016) | 10 | 24 | 0 | — | — | — | 34 |
| Special: All classes | 0 | 0 | 0 | — | — | — | 0 |
General election
| Incumbent retired | 3 | 2 | — | — | — | — | 5 |
| Held by same party | 3 | 2 | — | — | — | — | 5 |
| Replaced by other party | 0 | 0 | — | — | — | — | 0 |
| Result | 3 | 2 | — | — | — | — | 5 |
| Incumbent ran | 7 | 22 | — | — | — | — | 29 |
| Won re-election | 7 | 20 | — | — | — | — | 27 |
| Lost re-election | ▼2 Republicans replaced by ▲2 Democrats | | — | — | — | — | 2 |
| Lost renomination but held by same party | 0 | 0 | — | — | — | — | 0 |
| Result | 9 | 20 | — | — | — | — | 29 |
| Total elected | 12 | 22 | — | — | — | — | 34 |
| Net gain/loss | ▲2 | ▼2 | Steady | Steady | Steady | Steady | 2 |
| Nationwide vote | 51,315,969 | 40,841,717 | 626,763 | 1,788,112 | 695,838 | 1,598,110 | 96,866,509 |
| Share | 52.98% | 42.16% | 0.65% | 1.85% | 0.72% | 1.65% | 100% |
| Result | 46 | 52 | 2 | — | — | — | 100 |

Source: Clerk of the U.S. House of Representatives

== Change in composition ==
=== Before the elections ===
| D_{1} | D_{2} | D_{3} | D_{4} | D_{5} | D_{6} | D_{7} | D_{8} | D_{9} | D_{10} |
| D_{20} | D_{19} | D_{18} | D_{17} | D_{16} | D_{15} | D_{14} | D_{13} | D_{12} | D_{11} |
| D_{21} | D_{22} | D_{23} | D_{24} | D_{25} | D_{26} | D_{27} | D_{28} | D_{29} | D_{30} |
| D_{40} Vt. Ran | D_{39} Ore. Ran | D_{38} N.Y. Ran | D_{37} Hawaii; Ran | D_{36} Conn. Ran | D_{35} Colo. Ran | D_{34} | D_{33} | D_{32} | D_{31} |
| D_{41} Wash. Ran | D_{42} Calif. Retired | D_{43} Md. Retired | D_{44} Nev. Retired | I_{1} | I_{2} | R_{54} La. Retired | R_{53} Ind. Retired | R_{52} Wisc. Ran | R_{51} Utah; Ran |
| Majority → | | | | | | | | | R_{51} Utah; Ran |
| R_{41} Ky. Ran | R_{42} Mo. Ran | R_{43} N.H. Ran | R_{44} N.C. Ran | R_{45} N.Dak. Ran | R_{46} Ohio; Ran | R_{47} Okla. Ran | R_{48} Pa. Ran | R_{49} S.C. Ran | R_{50} S.Dak. Ran |
| R_{40} Kans. Ran | R_{39} Iowa; Ran | R_{38} Ill. Ran | R_{37} Idaho; Ran | R_{36} Ga. Ran | R_{35} Fla. Ran | R_{34} Ark. Ran | R_{33} Ariz. Ran | R_{32} Alaska; Ran | R_{31} Ala. Ran |
| R_{21} | R_{22} | R_{23} | R_{24} | R_{25} | R_{26} | R_{27} | R_{28} | R_{29} | R_{30} |
| R_{20} | R_{19} | R_{18} | R_{17} | R_{16} | R_{15} | R_{14} | R_{13} | R_{12} | R_{11} |
| R_{1} | R_{2} | R_{3} | R_{4} | R_{5} | R_{6} | R_{7} | R_{8} | R_{9} | R_{10} |

=== After the elections ===
| D_{1} | D_{2} | D_{3} | D_{4} | D_{5} | D_{6} | D_{7} | D_{8} | D_{9} | D_{10} |
| D_{20} | D_{19} | D_{18} | D_{17} | D_{16} | D_{15} | D_{14} | D_{13} | D_{12} | D_{11} |
| D_{21} | D_{22} | D_{23} | D_{24} | D_{25} | D_{26} | D_{27} | D_{28} | D_{29} | D_{30} |
| D_{40} Nev. Hold | D_{39} Md. Hold | D_{38} Hawaii; Re-elected | D_{37} Conn. Re-elected | D_{36} Colo. Re-elected | D_{35} Calif. Hold | D_{34} | D_{33} | D_{32} | D_{31} |
| D_{41} N.Y. Re-elected | D_{42} Ore. Re-elected | D_{43} Vt. Re-elected | D_{44} Wash. Re-elected | D_{45} Ill. Gain | D_{46} N.H. Gain | I_{1} | I_{2} | R_{52} Wisc. Re-elected | R_{51} Utah; Re-elected |
| Majority → | | | | | | | | | R_{51} Utah; Re-elected |
| R_{41} Ky. Re-elected | R_{42} La. Hold | R_{43} Mo. Re-elected | R_{44} N.C. Re-elected | R_{45} N.Dak. Re-elected | R_{46} Ohio; Re-elected | R_{47} Okla. Re-elected | R_{48} Pa. Re-elected | R_{49} S.C. Re-elected | R_{50} S.Dak. Re-elected |
| R_{40} Kans. Re-elected | R_{39} Iowa; Re-elected | R_{38} Ind. Hold | R_{37} Idaho; Re-elected | R_{36} Ga. Re-elected | R_{35} Fla. Re-elected | R_{34} Ark. Re-elected | R_{33} Ariz. Re-elected | R_{32} Alaska; Re-elected | R_{31} Ala. Re-elected |
| R_{21} | R_{22} | R_{23} | R_{24} | R_{25} | R_{26} | R_{27} | R_{28} | R_{29} | R_{30} |
| R_{20} | R_{19} | R_{18} | R_{17} | R_{16} | R_{15} | R_{14} | R_{13} | R_{12} | R_{11} |
| R_{1} | R_{2} | R_{3} | R_{4} | R_{5} | R_{6} | R_{7} | R_{8} | R_{9} | R_{10} |

Key:

| D_{#} | Democratic |
| R_{#} | Republican |
| I_{#} | Independent, caucusing with Democrats |

== Final pre-election predictions ==
Several sites and individuals publish predictions of competitive seats. These predictions look at factors such as the strength of the incumbent (if the incumbent is running for reelection) and the other candidates, and the state's partisan lean (reflected in part by the state's Cook Partisan Voting Index rating). The predictions assign ratings to each seat, indicating the predicted advantage that a party has in winning that seat.

Most election predictors used:

- "tossup": no advantage
- "tilt" (used by some predictors): advantage that is not quite as strong as "lean"
- "lean": slight advantage
- "likely" or "favored": significant, but surmountable, advantage
- "safe" or "solid": near-certain chance of victory

Where a site gives a percentage probability as its primary indicator of expected outcome, the chart below classifies a race as follows:

- Tossup: 50-55%
- Tilt: 56-60%
- Lean: 61-75%
- Likely: 76-93%
- Safe: 94-100%

The New York Times's Upshot gave the Democrats a 60% chance of winning the Senate on August 24, 2016; on September 23, their model gave Republicans a 58% chance to maintain control.

| Constituency | | Incumbent | | 2016 election ratings | | | | | | | | |
| State | PVI | Senator | Last election (Note: The last elections for this group of senators were in 2010, except for those elected in a special election or who were appointed after the resignation or passing of a sitting senator, as noted.) | Cook Nov. 2 2016 | Sabato Nov. 7 2016 | Roth. Nov. 3 2016 | Daily Kos Nov. 7 2016 | RCP Nov. 7 2016 | 538 Nov. 7 2016 | NYT Nov. 7 2016 | TPM Nov. 5 2016 | Result |
|---|---|---|---|---|---|---|---|---|---|---|---|---|
| Alabama | R+14 | Richard Shelby | 63.4% R | Safe R | Safe R | Safe R | Safe R | Safe R | Safe R | Safe R | Safe R | Shelby; 64.0% R |
| Alaska | R+12 | Lisa Murkowski | 39.5% R (Note: In the 2010 election, Republican nominee Joe Miller won 35.5% of the vote. Murkowski won as a write-in candidate with 39.5% of the vote.) | Likely R | Safe R | Safe R | Safe R | Safe R | Safe R | Safe R | Safe R | Murkowski; 44.4% R |
| Arizona | R+7 | John McCain | 59.2% R | Lean R | Likely R | Likely R | Safe R | Lean R | Safe R | Safe R | Safe R | McCain; 53.7% R |
| Arkansas | R+14 | John Boozman | 57.9% R | Safe R | Safe R | Safe R | Safe R | Safe R | Safe R | Safe R | Safe R | Boozman; 59.7% R |
| California | D+9 | Barbara Boxer (retiring) | 52.2% D | Safe D | Safe D | Safe D | Safe D | Safe D | Safe D | Safe D | Safe D | Harris; 61.8% D |
| Colorado | D+1 | Michael Bennet | 47.7% D | Likely D | Safe D | Safe D | Safe D | Lean D | Safe D | Safe D | Likely D | Bennet; 50.0% D |
| Connecticut | D+7 | Richard Blumenthal | 55.2% D | Safe D | Safe D | Safe D | Safe D | Safe D | Safe D | Safe D | Safe D | Blumenthal; 63.2% D |
| Florida | R+2 | Marco Rubio | 48.9% R | Lean R | Lean R | Lean R | Lean R | Tossup | Likely R | Likely R | Lean R | Rubio; 52.0% R |
| Georgia | R+6 | Johnny Isakson | 58.1% R | Likely R | Safe R | Safe R | Safe R | Likely R | Safe R | Safe R | Safe R | Isakson; 54.8% R |
| Hawaii | D+20 | Brian Schatz | 69.8% D (2014 special) (Note: Democrat Daniel Inouye won with 74.8% of the vote in 2010, but died on December 17, 2012.) | Safe D | Safe D | Safe D | Safe D | Safe D | Safe D | Safe D | Safe D | Schatz; 73.6% D |
| Idaho | R+18 | Mike Crapo | 71.2% R | Safe R | Safe R | Safe R | Safe R | Safe R | Safe R | Safe R | Safe R | Crapo; 66.1% R |
| Illinois | D+8 | Mark Kirk | 48.2% R | Lean D (flip) | Likely D (flip) | Lean D (flip) | Safe D (flip) | Likely D (flip) | Safe D (flip) | Safe D (flip) | Safe D (flip) | Duckworth; 54.9% D (flip) |
| Indiana | R+5 | Dan Coats (retiring) | 56.4% R | Tossup | Lean R | Tossup | Tossup | Tossup | Lean R | Tossup | Lean R | Young; 52.1% R |
| Iowa | D+1 | Chuck Grassley | 64.5% R | Likely R | Safe R | Safe R | Safe R | Safe R | Safe R | Safe R | Safe R | Grassley; 60.1% R |
| Kansas | R+12 | Jerry Moran | 70.0% R | Safe R | Safe R | Safe R | Safe R | Safe R | Safe R | Safe R | Safe R | Moran; 62.2% R |
| Kentucky | R+13 | Rand Paul | 55.7% R | Safe R | Safe R | Safe R | Safe R | Likely R | Safe R | Safe R | Safe R | Paul; 57.3% R |
| Louisiana | R+12 | David Vitter (retiring) | 56.6% R | Safe R | Likely R | Safe R | Safe R | Likely R | Safe R | Safe R | Likely R | Kennedy; 60.6% R |
| Maryland | D+10 | Barbara Mikulski (retiring) | 62.2% D | Safe D | Safe D | Safe D | Safe D | Safe D | Safe D | Safe D | Safe D | Van Hollen; 60.9% D |
| Missouri | R+5 | Roy Blunt | 54.3% R | Tossup | Lean R | Tossup | Lean R | Tossup | Tossup | Lean R | Tossup | Blunt; 49.2% R |
| Nevada | D+2 | Harry Reid (retiring) | 50.2% D | Tossup | Lean D | Tossup | Lean D | Tossup | Lean D | Lean D | Tossup | Cortez Masto; 47.1% D |
| New Hampshire | D+1 | Kelly Ayotte | 60.2% R | Tossup | Lean D (flip) | Tossup | Lean D (flip) | Tossup | Tossup | Tossup | Tossup | Hassan; 48.0% D (flip) |
| New York | D+11 | Chuck Schumer | 66.3% D | Safe D | Safe D | Safe D | Safe D | Safe D | Safe D | Safe D | Safe D | Schumer; 70.4% D |
| North Carolina | R+3 | Richard Burr | 55.0% R | Tossup | Lean R | Tossup | Tossup | Tossup | Lean R | Lean R | Tossup | Burr; 51.1% R |
| North Dakota | R+10 | John Hoeven | 76.1% R | Safe R | Safe R | Safe R | Safe R | Safe R | Safe R | Safe R | Safe R | Hoeven; 78.4% R |
| Oklahoma | R+19 | James Lankford | 67.9% R (2014 special) (Note: Republican Tom Coburn won with 70.6% of the vote in 2010, but resigned at the end of the 113th United States Congress.) | Safe R | Safe R | Safe R | Safe R | Safe R | Safe R | Safe R | Safe R | Lankford; 67.7% R |
| Ohio | R+1 | Rob Portman | 57.3% R | Lean R | Safe R | Likely R | Safe R | Safe R | Safe R | Safe R | Safe R | Portman; 58.0% R |
| Oregon | D+5 | Ron Wyden | 57.2% D | Safe D | Safe D | Safe D | Safe D | Safe D | Safe D | Safe D | Safe D | Wyden; 56.1% D |
| Pennsylvania | D+1 | Pat Toomey | 51.0% R | Tossup | Lean D (flip) | Tossup | Lean D (flip) | Tossup | Lean D (flip) | Lean D (flip) | Lean D (flip) | Toomey; 48.8% R |
| South Carolina | R+8 | Tim Scott | 61.1% R (2014 special) (Note: Republican Jim DeMint won with 61.5% of the vote in 2010, but resigned on January 2, 2013 to become a president of The Heritage Foundation.) | Safe R | Safe R | Safe R | Safe R | Safe R | Safe R | Safe R | Safe R | Scott; 60.5% R |
| South Dakota | R+10 | John Thune | 100.0% R (Note: In the 2010 election, Thune ran unopposed.) | Safe R | Safe R | Safe R | Safe R | Safe R | Safe R | Safe R | Safe R | Thune; 71.8% R |
| Utah | R+22 | Mike Lee | 61.6% R | Safe R | Safe R | Safe R | Safe R | Safe R | Safe R | Safe R | Safe R | Lee; 68.1% R |
| Vermont | D+18 | Patrick Leahy | 64.4% D | Safe D | Safe D | Safe D | Safe D | Safe D | Safe D | Safe D | Safe D | Leahy; 61.3% D |
| Washington | D+5 | Patty Murray | 52.4% D | Safe D | Safe D | Safe D | Safe D | Safe D | Safe D | Safe D | Safe D | Murray; 59.0% |
| Wisconsin | D+2 | Ron Johnson | 51.9% R | Tossup | Lean D (flip) | Tilt D (flip) | Lean D (flip) | Tossup | Likely D (flip) | Lean D (flip) | Lean D (flip) | Johnson; 50.2% R |
| Overall (Note: Democratic total includes 2 Independents who caucus with the Democrats) | | | | D - 46; R - 47; 7 tossups | D – 50 (Note: The predictor puts the Vice President for the Democrats, giving them control of the Senate in their ratings with only 50 seats.); R – 50; 0 tossups | D - 47; R - 47; 6 tossups | D - 50; R - 48; 2 tossups | D - 46; R - 46; 8 tossups | D - 49; R - 49; 2 tossups | D - 49; R - 49; 2 tossups | D - 48; R - 48; 4 tossups | Results: D - 48; R - 52 |

== Primary dates ==
This table shows the primary dates for regularly scheduled elections. It also shows the type of primary.

- "Open" primary: any registered voter can vote in any party's primary
- "Closed" primary, only voters registered with a specific party can vote in that party's primary.
- "Top-two" primary, all candidates run against each other regardless of party affiliation, and the top two candidates advance to the second round of voting. (In Louisiana, a candidate can win the election by winning a majority of the vote in the first round.)
- All of the various other primary types are classified as "hybrid." Alaska in 2008 provides one example of a hybrid primary: The Democratic Party allowed unaffiliated voters to vote in its primary, while the Republican Party only allowed party members to vote in its primary.

| State | Date | Type |
|---|---|---|
| Alabama | Mar. 1^{R} | Open |
| Arkansas | Mar. 1^{R} | Open |
| Illinois | Mar 15 | Hybrid |
| North Carolina | Mar 15 | Hybrid |
| Ohio | Mar 15 | Hybrid |
| Maryland | April 26 | Hybrid |
| Pennsylvania | April 26 | Closed |
| Indiana | May 3 | Open |
| Idaho | May 17 | Hybrid |
| Kentucky | May 17 | Closed |
| Oregon | May 17 | Hybrid |
| Georgia | May 24^{R} | Open |
| California | June 7 | Top-two |
| Iowa | June 7 | Hybrid |
| South Dakota | June 7^{R} | Hybrid |
| Nevada | June 14 | Closed |
| North Dakota | June 14 | Open |
| South Carolina | June 14^{R} | Hybrid |
| Colorado | June 28 | Hybrid |
| New York | June 28 | Closed |
| Oklahoma | June 28^{R} | Hybrid |
| Utah | June 28 | Hybrid |
| Kansas | Aug 2 | Closed |
| Missouri | Aug 2 | Open |
| Washington | Aug 2 | Top-two |
| Connecticut | Aug 9 | Hybrid |
| Vermont | Aug 9 | Open |
| Wisconsin | Aug 9 | Open |
| Hawaii | Aug 13 | Open |
| Alaska | Aug 16 | Hybrid |
| Arizona | Aug 30 | Hybrid |
| Florida | Aug 30 | Closed |
| New Hampshire | Sep 13 | Hybrid |
| Louisiana | Nov 8 | Top-two |

^{R}Indicates a state that requires primary run-off elections under certain conditions.

== Gains, losses and holds ==
=== Retirements ===
Map of retirements: Republican incumbent Democratic incumbent Democratic incumbent retired Republican incumbent retired

Three Democrats and two Republicans retired instead of seeking re-election.

| State | Senator | Age at end of term | Assumed office | Replaced by |
|---|---|---|---|---|
| California | Barbara Boxer | 76 | 1993 | Kamala Harris |
| Indiana | Dan Coats | 73 | 2011 (Note: Coats previously served as a Senator from 1989 to 1999.) | Todd Young |
| Louisiana | David Vitter | 55 | 2005 | John Kennedy |
| Maryland | Barbara Mikulski | 80 | 1987 | Chris Van Hollen |
| Nevada | Harry Reid | 77 | 1987 | Catherine Cortez Masto |

=== Defeats ===
Two Republicans sought re-election but lost in the general election.

| State | Senator | Age at end of term | Assumed office | Replaced by |
|---|---|---|---|---|
| Illinois | Mark Kirk | 57 | 2010 (Note: Elected in the 2010 special election to finish Barack Obama's term and a regular election to the next term.) | Tammy Duckworth |
| New Hampshire | Kelly Ayotte | 48 | 2011 | Maggie Hassan |

=== Post-election changes ===
One Republican resigned shortly after the start of the 115th Congress, and another Republican resigned during the 115th Congress for health reasons. Initially, all were replaced by Republican appointees. One Republican died during the 115th Congress and was replaced by a Republican appointee. One Democrat resigned during the 115th Congress and was replaced by a Democratic appointee. In Alabama, a 2017 special election was held prior to the 2020 Senate elections for the remainder of the Class 2 term, where Democrat Doug Jones won the special election to succeed Republican appointee Luther Strange, who lost nomination to finish the term. In addition, one Republican died during the 115th Congress and was replaced by a former Senator who was appointed at that Congress.

| State | Senator | Replaced by |
|---|---|---|
| Alabama (Class 2) | Jeff Sessions | Luther Strange |
| Alabama (Class 2) | Luther Strange | Doug Jones |
| Minnesota (Class 2) | Al Franken | Tina Smith |
| Mississippi (Class 2) | Thad Cochran | Cindy Hyde-Smith |
| Arizona (Class 3) | John McCain | Jon Kyl |

== Race summary ==
=== Elections leading to the next Congress ===
In these general elections, the winners were elected for the term beginning January 3, 2017; ordered by state.

All of the elections involved the Class 3 seats.

| State | Incumbent | | | Result | Candidates |
| State | Senator | Party | Electoral history | Result | Candidates |
|---|---|---|---|---|---|
| Alabama | Richard Shelby | Republican | 1986 (Note: Shelby was first elected in 1986 and re-elected in 1992 as a Democrat. He switched parties in 1994.); 1992; 1998; 2004; 2010 | Incumbent re-elected. | ▌ ✓ Richard Shelby (Republican) 64.0%; ▌Ron Crumpton (Democratic) 35.8%; Write-ins 0.2% |
| Alaska | Lisa Murkowski | Republican | 2002 (appointed); 2004; 2010 | Incumbent re-elected. | ▌ ✓ Lisa Murkowski (Republican) 44.5%; ▌Joe Miller (Libertarian) 29.2%; ▌Margaret Stock (Independent) 13.3%; ▌Ray Metcalfe (Democratic) 11.6% |
| Arizona | John McCain | Republican | 1986; 1992; 1998; 2004; 2010 | Incumbent re-elected. | ▌ ✓ John McCain (Republican) 53.7%; ▌Ann Kirkpatrick (Democratic) 40.8%; ▌Gary Swing (Green) 5.5% |
| Arkansas | John Boozman | Republican | 2010 | Incumbent re-elected. | ▌ ✓ John Boozman (Republican) 59.7%; ▌Conner Eldridge (Democratic) 36.3%; ▌Frank Gilbert (Libertarian) 4.0% |
| California | Barbara Boxer | Democratic | 1992; 1998; 2004; 2010 | Incumbent retired. Democratic hold. | ▌ ✓ Kamala Harris (Democratic) 61.8%; ▌Loretta Sanchez (Democratic) 38.2% |
| Colorado | Michael Bennet | Democratic | 2009 (appointed); 2010 | Incumbent re-elected. | ▌ ✓ Michael Bennet (Democratic) 50.0%; ▌Darryl Glenn (Republican) 44.3%; ▌Lily Tang Williams (Libertarian) 3.6%; ▌Arn Menconi (Green) 1.3% |
| Connecticut | Richard Blumenthal | Democratic | 2010 | Incumbent re-elected. | ▌ ✓ Richard Blumenthal (Democratic) 63.2%; ▌Dan E. Carter (Republican) 34.6%; ▌Richard Lion (Libertarian) 1.1%; ▌Jeff Russell (Green) 1.0% |
| Florida | Marco Rubio | Republican | 2010 | Incumbent re-elected. | ▌ ✓ Marco Rubio (Republican) (Note: Rubio had planned to retire at the end of the 114th Congress and initially not to run for re-election when he was running for president; however, he subsequently decided to run in this same seat after finished third in the Republican primaries.) 52.0%; ▌Patrick Murphy (Democratic) 44.3%; ▌Paul Stanton (Libertarian) 2.1% |
| Georgia | Johnny Isakson | Republican | 2004; 2010 | Incumbent re-elected. | ▌ ✓ Johnny Isakson (Republican) 54.8%; ▌Jim Barksdale (Democratic) 41%; ▌Allen Buckley (Libertarian) 4.16% |
| Hawaii | Brian Schatz | Democratic | 2012 (appointed); 2014 (special) | Incumbent re-elected. | ▌ ✓ Brian Schatz (Democratic) 73.6%; ▌John Carroll (Republican) 22.2% |
| Idaho | Mike Crapo | Republican | 1998; 2004; 2010 | Incumbent re-elected. | ▌ ✓ Mike Crapo (Republican) 66.1%; ▌Jerry Sturgill (Democratic) 27.8%; ▌Ray Writz (Constitution) 6.0% |
| Illinois | Mark Kirk | Republican | 2010 (special); 2010 | Incumbent lost re-election. Democratic gain. | ▌ ✓ Tammy Duckworth (Democratic) 54.9%; ▌Mark Kirk (Republican) 39.8%; ▌Kent McMillen (Libertarian) 3.2%; ▌Scott Summers (Green) 2.1% |
| Indiana | Dan Coats | Republican | 1989 (appointed); 1990 (special); 1992; 1998 (retired); 2010 | Incumbent retired. Republican hold. | ▌ ✓ Todd Young (Republican) 52.1%; ▌Evan Bayh (Democratic) 42.4%; ▌Lucy Brenton (Libertarian) 5.5% |
| Iowa | Chuck Grassley | Republican | 1980; 1986; 1992; 1998; 2004; 2010 | Incumbent re-elected. | ▌ ✓ Chuck Grassley (Republican) 60.1%; ▌Patty Judge (Democratic) 35.7%; ▌John Heiderscheit (Libertarian) 2.7% |
| Kansas | Jerry Moran | Republican | 2010 | Incumbent re-elected. | ▌ ✓ Jerry Moran (Republican) 62.1%; ▌Patrick Wiesner (Democratic) 32.2%; ▌Robert Garrard (Libertarian) 5.5% |
| Kentucky | Rand Paul | Republican | 2010 | Incumbent re-elected. | ▌ ✓ Rand Paul (Republican) 57.3%; ▌Jim Gray (Democratic) 42.7% |
| Louisiana | David Vitter | Republican | 2004; 2010 | Incumbent retired. Republican hold. | ▌ ✓ John Kennedy (Republican) 60.65%; ▌Foster Campbell (Democratic) 39.35% |
| Maryland | Barbara Mikulski | Democratic | 1986; 1992; 1998; 2004; 2010 | Incumbent retired. Democratic hold. | ▌ ✓ Chris Van Hollen (Democratic) 60.9%; ▌Kathy Szeliga (Republican) 35.7%; ▌Margaret Flowers (Green) 3.3% |
| Missouri | Roy Blunt | Republican | 2010 | Incumbent re-elected. | ▌ ✓ Roy Blunt (Republican) 49.3%; ▌Jason Kander (Democratic) 46.2%; ▌Jonathan Dine (Libertarian) 2.42% |
| Nevada | Harry Reid | Democratic | 1986; 1992; 1998; 2004; 2010 | Incumbent retired. Democratic hold. | ▌ ✓ Catherine Cortez Masto (Democratic) 47.1%; ▌Joe Heck (Republican) 44.7%; Others: ▌Tom Jones (Independent American) 1.55%; ▌Tony Gumina (unaffiliated) 0.97%; ▌Jarrod Michael Williams (unaffiliated) 0.62% |
| New Hampshire | Kelly Ayotte | Republican | 2010 | Incumbent lost re-election. Democratic gain. | ▌ ✓ Maggie Hassan (Democratic) 47.97%; ▌Kelly Ayotte (Republican) 47.87%; ▌Brian Chabot (Libertarian) 1.70% |
| New York | Chuck Schumer | Democratic | 1998; 2004; 2010 | Incumbent re-elected. | ▌ ✓ Chuck Schumer (Democratic) 70.4%; ▌Wendy Long (Republican) 27.4%; Others: ▌Robin Wilson (Green) 1.53%; ▌Alex Merced (Libertarian) 0.65% |
| North Carolina | Richard Burr | Republican | 2004; 2010 | Incumbent re-elected. | ▌ ✓ Richard Burr (Republican) 51.1%; ▌Deborah Ross (Democratic) 45.3%; ▌Sean Haugh (Libertarian) 3.57% |
| North Dakota | John Hoeven | Republican | 2010 | Incumbent re-elected. | ▌ ✓ John Hoeven (Republican) 78.4%; ▌Eliot Glassheim (Democratic-NPL) 17.0%; ▌Robert Marquette (Libertarian) 3.08% |
| Ohio | Rob Portman | Republican | 2010 | Incumbent re-elected. | ▌ ✓ Rob Portman (Republican) 58.0%; ▌Ted Strickland (Democratic) 37.1%; ▌Joseph DeMare (Green) 1.6% |
| Oklahoma | James Lankford | Republican | 2014 (special) | Incumbent re-elected. | ▌ ✓ James Lankford (Republican) 67.7%; ▌Mike Workman (Democratic) 24.5%; ▌Robert Murphy (Libertarian) 3.00% |
| Oregon | Ron Wyden | Democratic | 1996 (special); 1998; 2004; 2010 | Incumbent re-elected. | ▌ ✓ Ron Wyden (Democratic) 56.1%; ▌Mark Callahan (Republican) 33.35%; Others: ▌Jim Lindsay (Libertarian) 1.23%; ▌Eric Navickas (Green) 2.50% |
| Pennsylvania | Pat Toomey | Republican | 2010 | Incumbent re-elected. | ▌ ✓ Pat Toomey (Republican) 48.9%; ▌Katie McGinty (Democratic) 47.2%; ▌Edward Clifford (Libertarian) 3.89% |
| South Carolina | Tim Scott | Republican | 2013 (appointed); 2014 (special) | Incumbent re-elected. | ▌ ✓ Tim Scott (Republican) 60.5%; ▌Thomas Dixon (Democratic) 37.0%; ▌Bill Bledsoe (Libertarian) 1.83% |
| South Dakota | John Thune | Republican | 2004; 2010 | Incumbent re-elected. | ▌ ✓ John Thune (Republican) 71.8%; ▌Jay Williams (Democratic) 28.2% |
| Utah | Mike Lee | Republican | 2010 | Incumbent re-elected. | ▌ ✓ Mike Lee (Republican) 68.1%; ▌Misty Snow (Democratic) 27.1%; Others: ▌Stoney Fonua (Independent American) 2.45%; ▌Bill Barron (unaffiliated) 2.34% |
| Vermont | Patrick Leahy | Democratic | 1974; 1980; 1986; 1992; 1998; 2004; 2010 | Incumbent re-elected. | ▌ ✓ Patrick Leahy (Democratic) 61.3%; ▌Scott Milne (Republican) 33.0%; ▌Cris Ericson (Marijuana) 2.86%; Others: ▌Jerry Trudell (unaffiliated) 1.63%; ▌Peter Diamondstone (Liberty Union) 1.01% |
| Washington | Patty Murray | Democratic | 1992; 1998; 2004; 2010 | Incumbent re-elected. | ▌ ✓ Patty Murray (Democratic) 59.01%; ▌Chris Vance (Republican) 40.99% |
| Wisconsin | Ron Johnson | Republican | 2010 | Incumbent re-elected. | ▌ ✓ Ron Johnson (Republican) 50.19%; ▌Russ Feingold (Democratic) 46.84%; ▌Phil Anderson (Libertarian) 2.7% |

== Closest races ==
Nine races had a margin of victory under 10%:

| State | Party of winner | Margin |
|---|---|---|
| New Hampshire | Democratic (flip) | 0.14% |
| Pennsylvania | Republican | 1.43% |
| Nevada | Democratic | 2.43% |
| Missouri | Republican | 2.79% |
| Wisconsin | Republican | 3.36% (Note: Wisconsin was the "tipping point" state.) |
| Colorado | Democratic | 5.66% |
| North Carolina | Republican | 5.70% |
| Florida | Republican | 7.67% |
| Indiana | Republican | 9.70% |

== Alabama ==
Alabama election
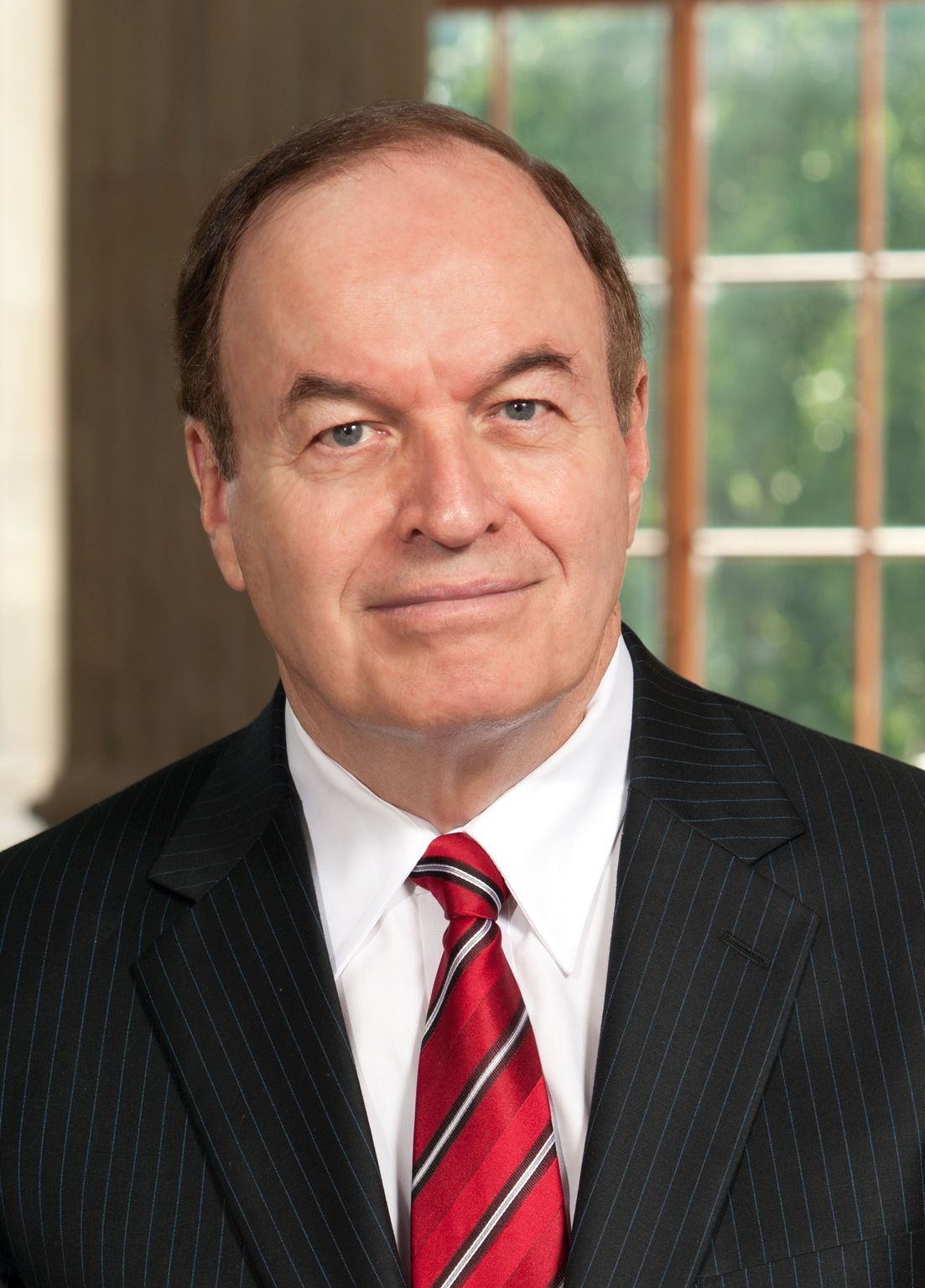

| Nominee | Richard Shelby | Ron Crumpton |
| Party | Republican | Democratic |
| Popular vote | 1,335,104 | 748,709 |
| Percentage | 64.0% | 35.9% |
- Shelby: 50–60% 60–70% 70–80% 80–90% Crumpton: 50–60% 60–70% 70–80% 80–90%
U.S. senator before election
Richard Shelby
Republican
Elected U.S. Senator
Richard Shelby
Republican

Incumbent Republican Richard Shelby won re-election to a sixth term in office. The primaries were held on March 1. Ron Crumpton, a marijuana legalization activist, was the Democratic nominee. Shelby won re-election with 63.9% of the vote.

Shelby was first elected to the Senate in 1986 as a Democrat and was easily re-elected in 1992 as such. He switched his party affiliation to Republican on November 9, 1994, one day after the Republicans won control of both houses in the midterm elections. He won his first full term as a Republican in 1998 by a large margin and faced no significant opposition in 2004 or 2010.

If Shelby had decided to retire, numerous high-profile Alabama Republicans were speculated to run, including U.S. representatives Robert Aderholt, Mo Brooks, Bradley Byrne, Gary Palmer, Martha Roby, and Mike Rogers, State Treasurer Young Boozer, State Speaker Mike Hubbard, Lieutenant Governor Kay Ivey, State Senate President Pro Tempore Del Marsh, Secretary of State John Merrill, U.S. Appeals Court Judge William H. Pryor Jr., former governor Bob Riley, and Attorney General Luther Strange. Shelby announced in January 2015 that he would run for re-election.

Republican primary election
| Party | Candidate | Votes | % |
|---|---|---|---|
| Republican | Richard Shelby (incumbent) | 505,586 | 64.91 |
| Republican | Jonathan McConnell | 214,770 | 27.58 |
| Republican | John Martin | 23,558 | 3.02 |
| Republican | Marcus Bowman | 19,707 | 2.53 |
| Republican | Shadrack McGill | 15,230 | 1.96 |
| Total votes | | 778,851 | 100.00 |

Democratic primary election
| Party | Candidate | Votes | % |
|---|---|---|---|
| Democratic | Ron Crumpton | 145,681 | 55.97 |
| Democratic | Charles Nana | 114,617 | 44.03 |
| Total votes | | 260,298 | 100.00 |

Alabama general election
| Party | Candidate | Votes | % |
|---|---|---|---|
| Republican | Richard Shelby (incumbent) | 1,335,104 | 63.96 |
| Democratic | Ron Crumpton | 748,709 | 35.87 |
| Write-In | Others | 3,631 | 0.17 |
| Total votes | | 2,087,444 | 100.00 |
| Republican hold | | | |

== Alaska ==
Alaska election
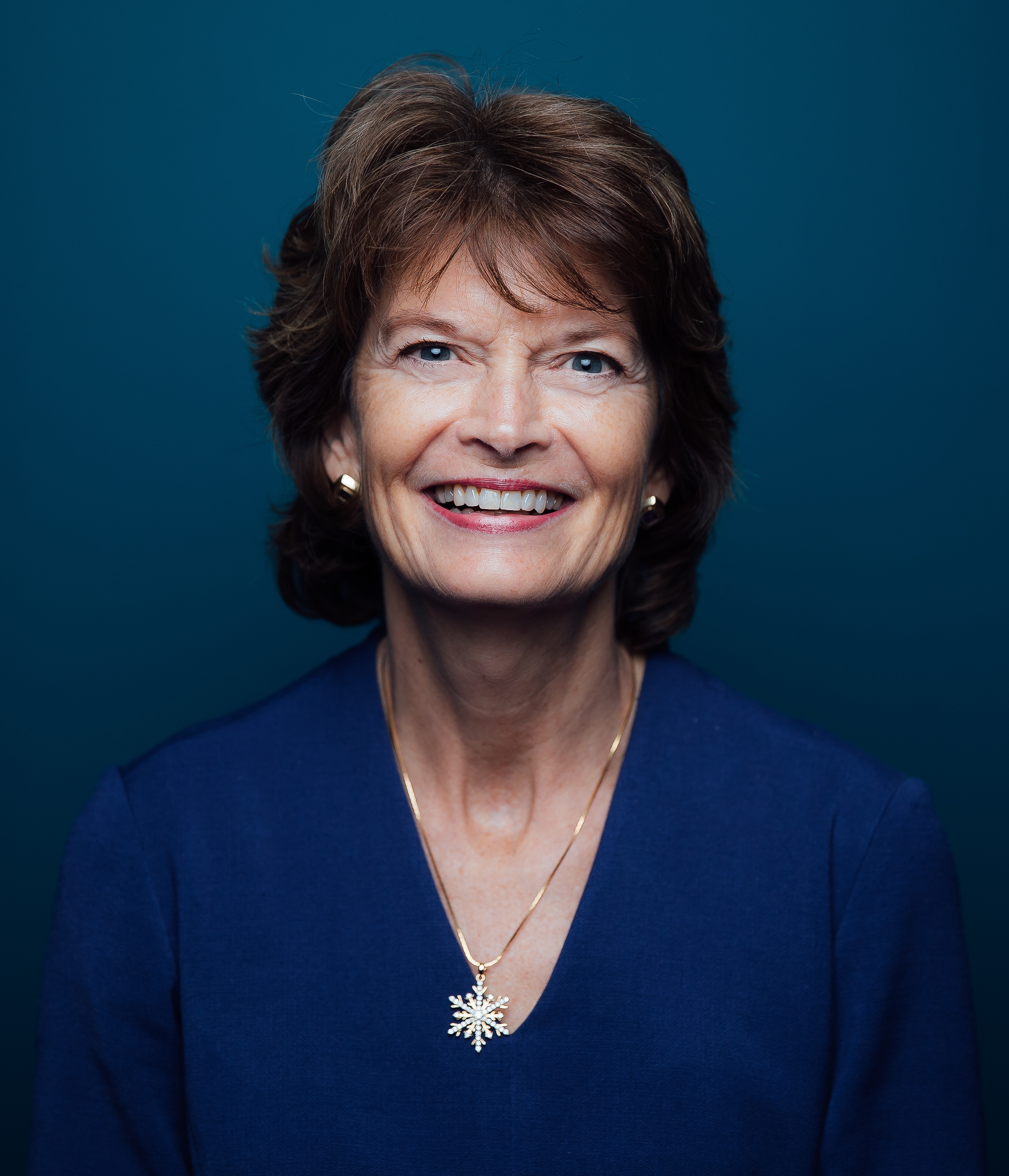

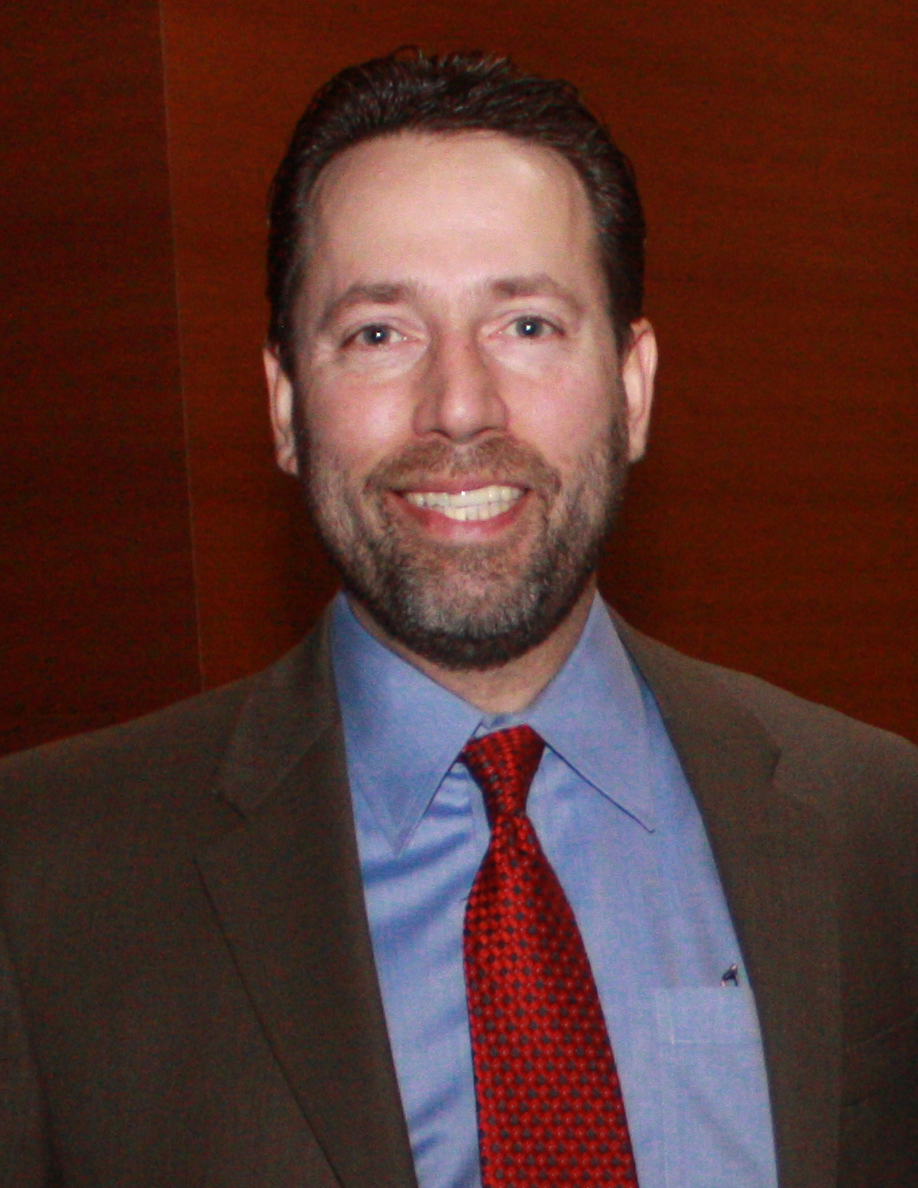

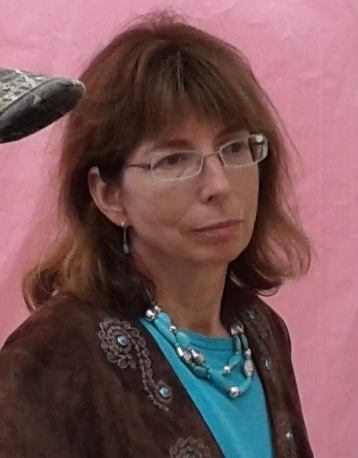
| Nominee | Lisa Murkowski | Joe Miller |
| Party | Republican | Libertarian |
| Popular vote | 138,149 | 90,825 |
| Percentage | 44.4% | 29.2% |
| Nominee | Margaret Stock | Ray Metcalfe |
| Party | Independent | Democratic |
| Popular vote | 41,194 | 36,200 |
| Percentage | 13.2% | 11.6% |
- Murkowski: 30–40% 40–50% 50–60% 60–70% Miller: 40–50% 50–60%
U.S. senator before election
Lisa Murkowski
Republican
Elected U.S. Senator
Lisa Murkowski
Republican

Two-term senator Lisa Murkowski (Republican) was appointed in 2002 and elected to a full term in 2004. She was defeated in the Republican primary in 2010 by Joe Miller. She later ran as a write-in candidate in the 2010 general election and was re-elected to a second full term with 40% of the vote, making her one of two senators in US history to win election via write-in votes. She was 59 years old in 2016. She ran for re-election.

Thomas Lamb, a candidate for the state House in 2006, and Bob Lochner filed to run against Murkowski. Other potential Republican primary challengers included 2010 nominee and 2014 candidate Joe Miller, State Senator Mike J. Dunleavy, former lieutenant governor Mead Treadwell, and former mayor of Anchorage Dan Sullivan.

The only person to file for the Democratic primary as of May 20 was writer and satirist Richard Grayson, who previously sought election to Wyoming's House seat in 2014. Potential Democratic candidates included State Senator Dennis Egan, State Representative Andy Josephson, State Senator Bill Wielechowski, State Senator Hollis French and State Senate Minority Leader Johnny Ellis. Former senator Mark Begich was mentioned as a possible candidate, but he declined to run.

Murkowski won her primary on August 16, 2016 with 72 percent of the vote. Joe Miller received the Libertarian nomination and ran against Murkowski in the general election. Anchorage attorney and veteran Margaret Stock ran as an independent candidate.

Murkowski won re-election with 44% of the vote, compared to Miller with 30% and Metcalfe with 11%. 15% went to other candidates. Murkowski has been re-elected three times now with 48% in 2004, 39.5% in 2010 and 44% in 2016, never having won a majority.

Republican primary election
| Party | Candidate | Votes | % |
|---|---|---|---|
| Republican | Lisa Murkowski (incumbent) | 39,545 | 71.52 |
| Republican | Bob Lochner | 8,480 | 15.34 |
| Republican | Paul Kendall | 4,272 | 7.73 |
| Republican | Thomas Lamb | 2,996 | 5.42 |
| Total votes | | 55,293 | 100.00 |

Other primary elections
| Party | Candidate | Votes | % |
|---|---|---|---|
| Democratic | Ray Metcalfe | 15,228 | 50.06 |
| Democratic | Edgar Blatchford | 10,090 | 33.17 |
| Libertarian | Cean Stevens | 5,102 | 16.77 |
| Total votes | | 30,420 | 100.00 |

General election
| Party | Candidate | Votes | % |
|---|---|---|---|
| Republican | Lisa Murkowski (incumbent) | 138,149 | 44.36 |
| Libertarian | Joe Miller | 90,825 | 29.16 |
| Independent | Margaret Stock | 41,194 | 13.23 |
| Democratic | Ray Metcalfe | 36,200 | 11.62 |
| Independent | Breck A. Craig | 2,609 | 0.84 |
| Independent | Ted Gianoutsos | 1,758 | 0.56 |
| Write-In | Other write-in votes | 706 | 0.23 |
| Total votes | | 311,441 | 100.00 |
| Republican hold | | | |

== Arizona ==
Arizona election
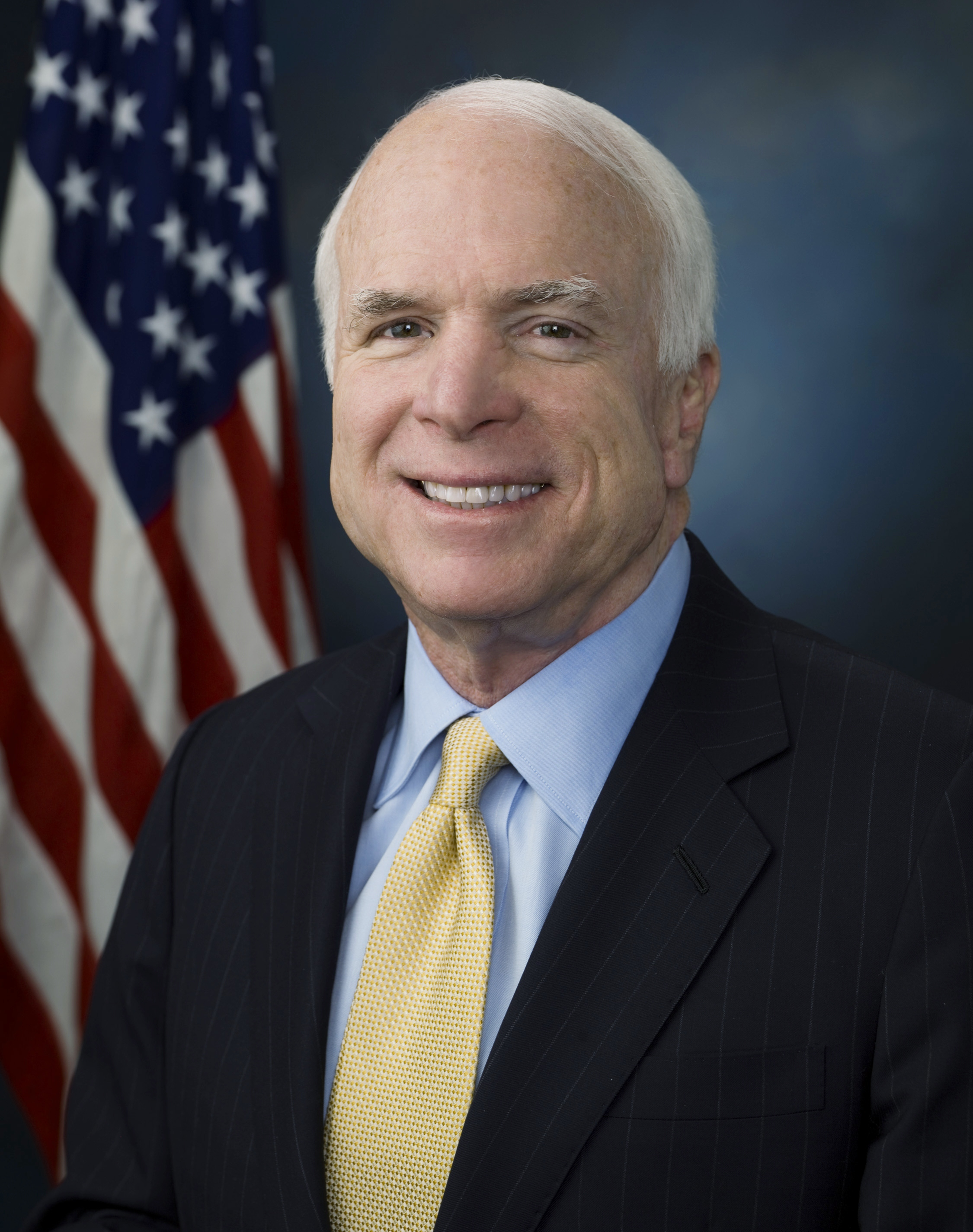

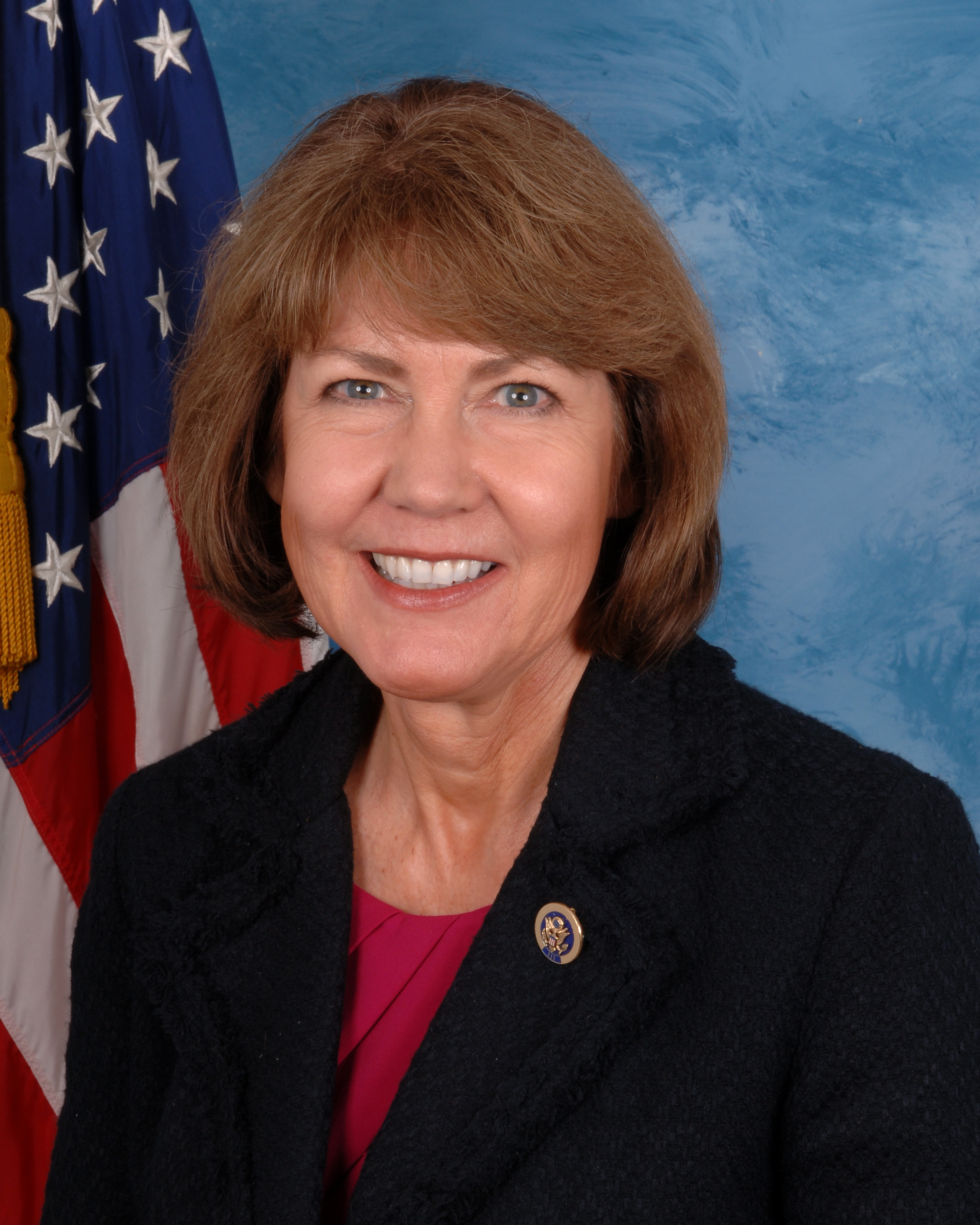

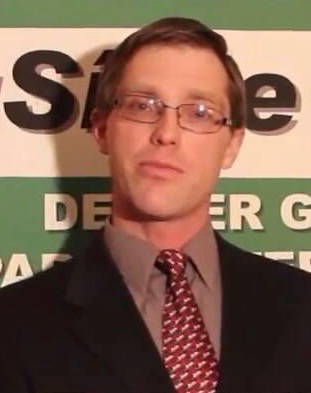
| Nominee | John McCain | Ann Kirkpatrick |
| Party | Republican | Democratic |
| Popular vote | 1,359,267 | 1,031,245 |
| Percentage | 53.7% | 40.8% |
| Nominee | Gary Swing |
| Party | Green |
| Popular vote | 138,634 |
| Percentage | 5.5% |
- McCain: 40–50% 50–60% 60–70% Kirkpatrick: 40–50% 50–60% 60–70%
U.S. senator before election
John McCain
Republican
Elected U.S. Senator
John McCain
Republican

Five-term senator and Republican presidential candidate in 2008 John McCain was re-elected with 59% of the vote in 2010. He was 80 years old in 2016. Despite speculation that he might retire, McCain ran for re-election.

McCain faced primary challenges from Fair Tax activist Alex Meluskey, businessman David Pizer, talk radio host Clair Van Steenwyk, and State Senator Kelli Ward. David Pizer later dropped out of the race. Representatives Matt Salmon and David Schweikert were both mentioned as possible candidates, but both chose not to run. Other potential Republican candidates included former governor Jan Brewer, businesswoman and 2014 gubernatorial candidate Christine Jones, former governor of Alaska and 2008 vice presidential candidate Sarah Palin, former U.S. representative John Shadegg, and former Arizona attorney general Grant Woods.

Congresswoman Ann Kirkpatrick and teacher Lennie Clark ran for the Democratic nomination. Lennie Clark dropped out and Ann Kirkpatrick became the Democratic nominee. Other potential Democratic candidates included U.S. representative Ruben Gallego, former Surgeon General and 2012 nominee Richard Carmona, 2014 gubernatorial nominee Fred DuVal, Phoenix Mayor Greg Stanton, and retired astronaut Mark Kelly, the husband of ex-Congresswoman Gabby Giffords.

Arizona Republican primary election
| Party | Candidate | Votes | % |
|---|---|---|---|
| Republican | John McCain (incumbent) | 302,532 | 51.7 |
| Republican | Kelli Ward | 235,988 | 39.2 |
| Republican | Alex Meluskey | 31,159 | 5.5 |
| Republican | Clair Van Steenwyk | 21,476 | 3.6 |
| Republican | Sean Webster (Write-In) | 175 | 0.0 |
| Total votes | | 591,330 | 100.00 |

Arizona Democratic primary election
| Party | Candidate | Votes | % |
|---|---|---|---|
| Democratic | Ann Kirkpatrick | 333,586 | 99.85 |
| Democratic | Alex Bello (Write-In) | 508 | 0.15 |
| Total votes | | 334,094 | 100.00 |

Arizona Green primary election
| Party | Candidate | Votes | % |
|---|---|---|---|
| Green | Gary Swing (Write-In) | 238 | 100.00 |
| Total votes | | 238 | 100.00 |

Arizona Libertarian primary election
| Party | Candidate | Votes | % |
|---|---|---|---|
| Libertarian | Merissa Hamilton (Write-In) | 1,286 | 100.00 |
| Total votes | | 1,286 | 100.00 |

Sen. McCain won re-election with 53% to Kirkpatrick's 41%.

Arizona general election
| Party | Candidate | Votes | % | ±% |
|---|---|---|---|---|
| Republican | John McCain (incumbent) | 1,359,267 | 53.74 | −5.33% |
| Democratic | Ann Kirkpatrick | 1,031,245 | 40.77 | +5.99% |
| Green | Gary Swing | 138,634 | 5.48 | +4.03% |
| Plurality | | 328,022 | 12.97 | |
| Total votes | | 2,529,146 | 100.00 | |
| Turnout | | 3,588,466 | 74.17 | |
| Republican hold | | Swing | | |

== Arkansas ==
Arkansas election
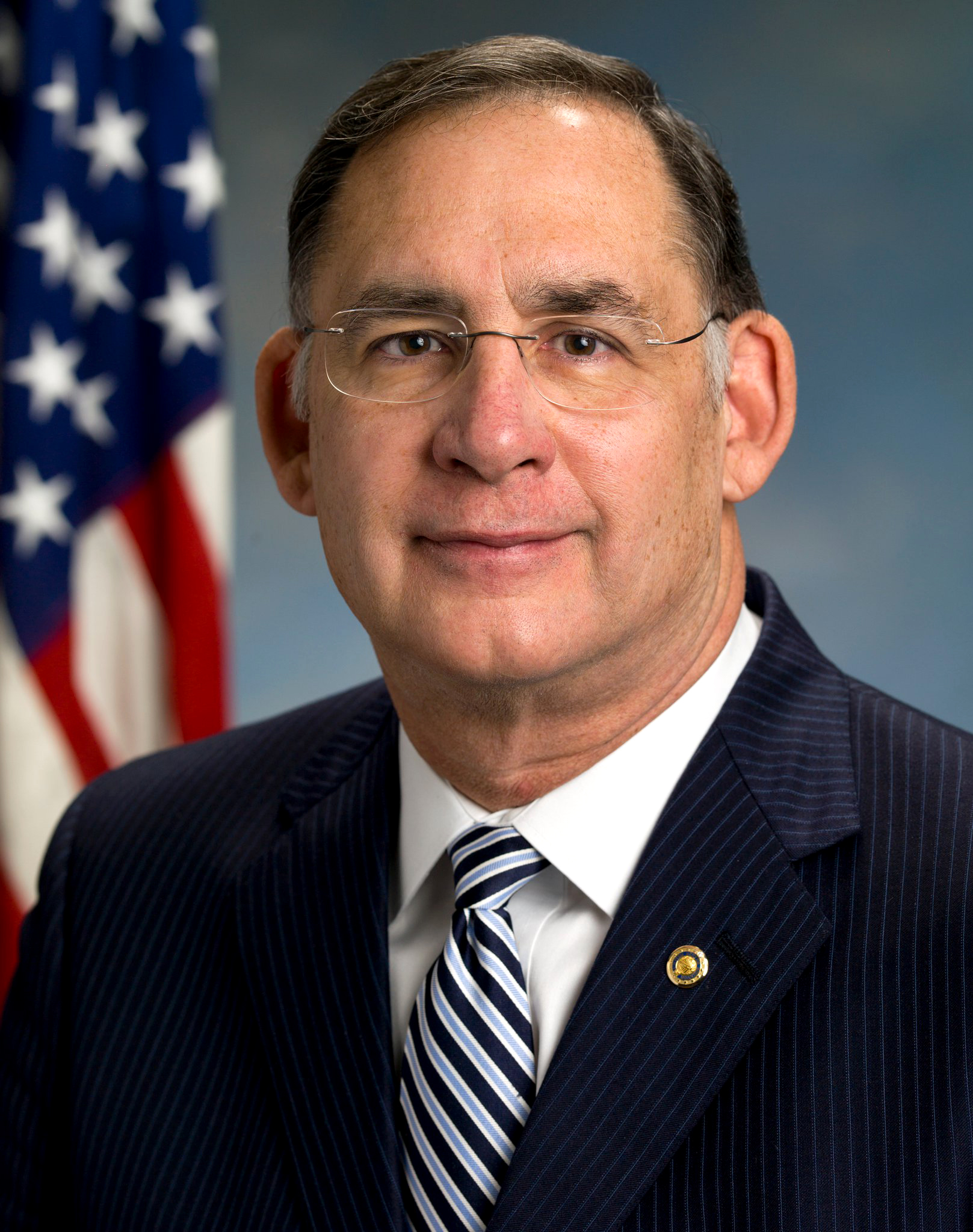

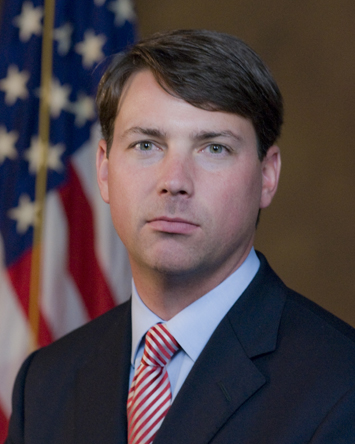
| Nominee | John Boozman | Conner Eldridge |
| Party | Republican | Democratic |
| Popular vote | 661,984 | 400,602 |
| Percentage | 59.8% | 36.2% |
- County results Boozman: 40–50% 50–60% 60–70% 70–80% Eldridge: 40–50% 50–60% 60–70%
U.S. senator before election
John Boozman
Republican
Elected U.S. Senator
John Boozman
Republican

One-term senator John Boozman (Republican) defeated two-term senator Blanche Lincoln with 58% of the vote in 2010. He was 65 years old in 2016. Despite speculation that he might retire following health problems, Boozman ran for re-election. Fellow Republican Curtis Coleman, who ran against Boozman in 2010 but came in fifth place, ran again.

Conner Eldridge, the former U.S. Attorney for the Western District of Arkansas, was the only Democrat who met the filing deadline.

Frank Gilbert was the candidate for the Libertarian Party, and Jason Tate was running a write-in campaign.

Incumbent Republican Senator John Boozman won re-election to a second term in office, becoming the first Republican senator re-elected in the history of the state.

Arkansas Republican primary election
| Party | Candidate | Votes | % |
|---|---|---|---|
| Republican | John Boozman (incumbent) | 298,039 | 76.45 |
| Republican | Curtis Coleman | 91,795 | 23.55 |
| Total votes | | 389,834 | 100.00 |

Democratic primary
| Party | Candidate | Votes | % |
|---|---|---|---|
| Democratic | Conner Eldridge | 214,228 | 100.00 |
| Total votes | | 214,228 | 100.00 |

Sen. Boozman won re-election with 60% to Eldridge's 36%.

Arkansas general election
| Party | Candidate | Votes | % |
|---|---|---|---|
| Republican | John Boozman (incumbent) | 661,984 | 59.77 |
| Democratic | Conner Eldridge | 400,602 | 36.17 |
| Libertarian | Frank Gilbert | 43,866 | 3.96 |
| Write-ins | Others | 1,070 | 0.10 |
| Total votes | | 1,107,522 | 100.00 |
| Republican hold | | | |

== California ==
California election
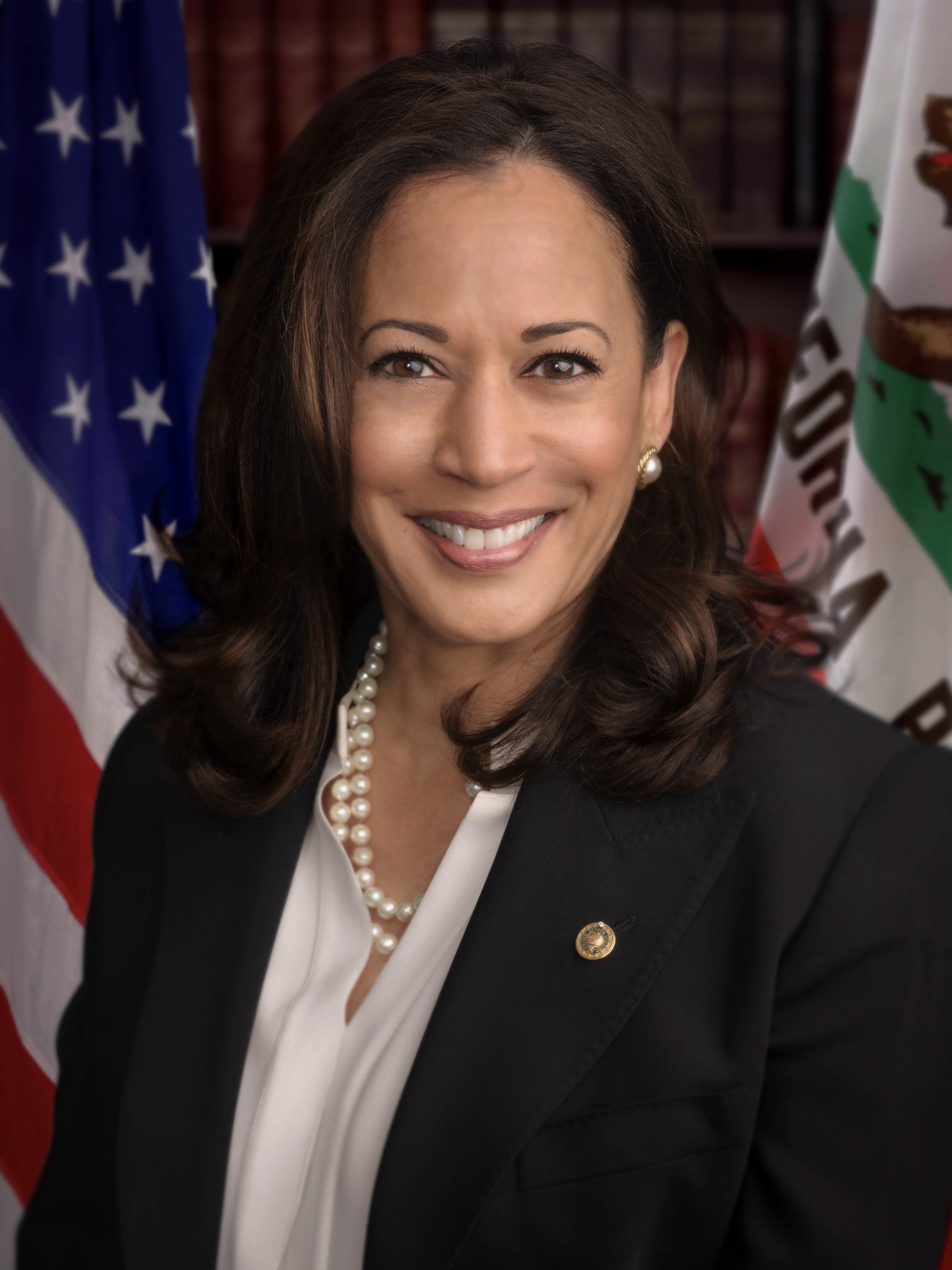

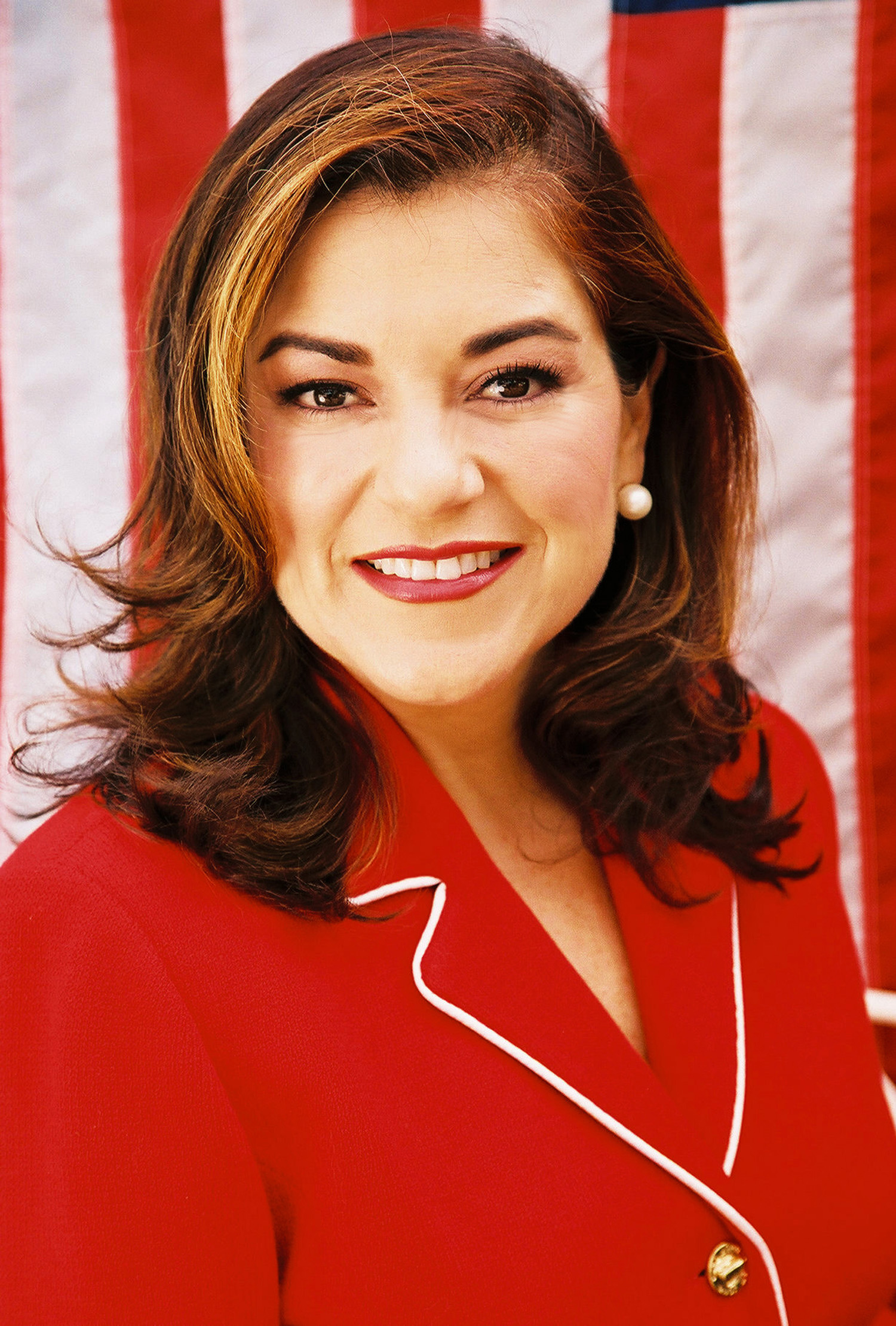
| Candidate | Kamala Harris | Loretta Sanchez |
| Party | Democratic | Democratic |
| Popular vote | 7,542,753 | 4,701,417 |
| Percentage | 61.6% | 38.4% |
- Harris: 50–60% 60–70% 70–80% Sanchez: 50–60% 60–70%
U.S. senator before election
Barbara Boxer
Democratic
Elected U.S. Senator
Kamala Harris
Democratic

Four-term senator Barbara Boxer (Democrat) was re-elected with 52% of the vote in 2010. Boxer declined to run for re-election. California Attorney General Kamala Harris and U.S. representative Loretta Sanchez, both Democrats, finished first and second, respectively, in California's nonpartisan blanket primary, and contested the general election. As such, Boxer's successor was guaranteed to be a Democrat. This marked a historic first such occasion in California, ever since the Senate elections began in 1914.

Other Democrats on the primary ballot included "President" Cristina Grappo, Massie Munroe, Herbert Peters, Emory Rogers, and Steve Stokes. Among the potential candidates who declined to run were Governor Jerry Brown, Lieutenant Governor Gavin Newsom, U.S. representatives Xavier Becerra and Adam Schiff, and Los Angeles Mayor Eric Garcetti.

Former state Republican Party chairs Tom Del Beccaro and Duf Sundheim, and former state senator Phil Wyman ran, along with Don Krampe, Tom Palzer, Karen Roseberry, Greg Conlon, Von Huogo, Jerry Laws, Ron Unz, Jarrell Williamson, and George Yang. State Assemblymen Rocky Chavez was running as well, but withdrew from the race. Republicans who were once considered potential candidates but ruled out runs included San Diego Mayor Kevin Faulconer, former Assistant Secretary of the Treasury for Financial Stability and 2014 gubernatorial nominee Neel Kashkari, U.S. representative Darrell Issa, and businesswoman and nominee for the U.S. Senate in 2010 Carly Fiorina.

Independent Mike Beitiks ran on a single-issue climate change platform.

Polling conducted by the SurveyUSA from March 30, 2016 to April 3, 2016 indicated that Harris was ahead with 26%, compared to Rep. Sánchez with 22%, Del Beccaro with 8%, Wyman with 8%, and Sundheim with 3%; 7% of those polled were supporting other candidates, and 24% were undecided.

Harris won the election with 62% of the vote to Sanchez's 38%.

California jungle primary election
| Party | Candidate | Votes | % |
|---|---|---|---|
| Democratic | Kamala Harris | 3,000,689 | 39.9 |
| Democratic | Loretta Sanchez | 1,416,203 | 18.9 |
| Republican | Duf Sundheim | 584,251 | 7.8 |
| Republican | Phil Wyman | 352,821 | 4.7 |
| Republican | Tom Del Beccaro | 323,614 | 4.3 |
| Republican | Greg Conlon | 230,944 | 3.1 |
| Democratic | Steve Stokes | 168,805 | 2.2 |
| Republican | George C. Yang | 112,055 | 1.5 |
| Republican | Karen Roseberry | 110,557 | 1.5 |
| Libertarian | Gail K. Lightfoot | 99,761 | 1.3 |
| Democratic | Massie Munroe | 98,150 | 1.3 |
| Green | Pamela Elizondo | 95,677 | 1.3 |
| Republican | Tom Palzer | 93,263 | 1.2 |
| Republican | Ron Unz | 92,325 | 1.2 |
| Republican | Don Krampe | 69,635 | 0.9 |
| No party preference | Eleanor García | 65,084 | 0.9 |
| Republican | Jarrell Williamson | 64,120 | 0.9 |
| Republican | Von Hougo | 63,609 | 0.8 |
| Democratic | President Cristina Grappo | 63,330 | 0.8 |
| Republican | Jerry J. Laws | 53,023 | 0.7 |
| Libertarian | Mark Matthew Herd | 41,344 | 0.6 |
| Peace and Freedom | John Thompson Parker | 35,998 | 0.5 |
| No party preference | Ling Ling Shi | 35,196 | 0.5 |
| Democratic | Herbert G. Peters | 32,638 | 0.4 |
| Democratic | Emory Peretz Rodgers | 31,485 | 0.4 |
| No party preference | Mike Beitiks | 31,450 | 0.4 |
| No party preference | Clive Grey | 29,418 | 0.4 |
| No party preference | Jason Hanania | 27,715 | 0.4 |
| No party preference | Paul Merritt | 24,031 | 0.3 |
| No party preference | Jason Kraus | 19,318 | 0.3 |
| No party preference | Don J. Grundmann | 15,317 | 0.2 |
| No party preference | Scott A. Vineberg | 11,843 | 0.2 |
| No party preference | Tim Gildersleeve | 9,798 | 0.1 |
| No party preference | Gar Myers | 8,726 | 0.1 |
| Write-In | Billy Falling | 87 | 0.0 |
| Write-In | Ric M. Llewellyn | 32 | 0.0 |
| Write-In | Alexis Stuart | 10 | 0.0 |
| Total votes | | 7,512,322 | 100.0 |

California general election
| Party | Candidate | Votes | % |
|---|---|---|---|
| Democratic | Kamala Harris | 7,542,753 | 61.6 |
| Democratic | Loretta Sanchez | 4,701,417 | 38.4 |
| Total votes | | 12,244,170 | 100.0 |
| Democratic hold | | | |

== Colorado ==
Colorado election
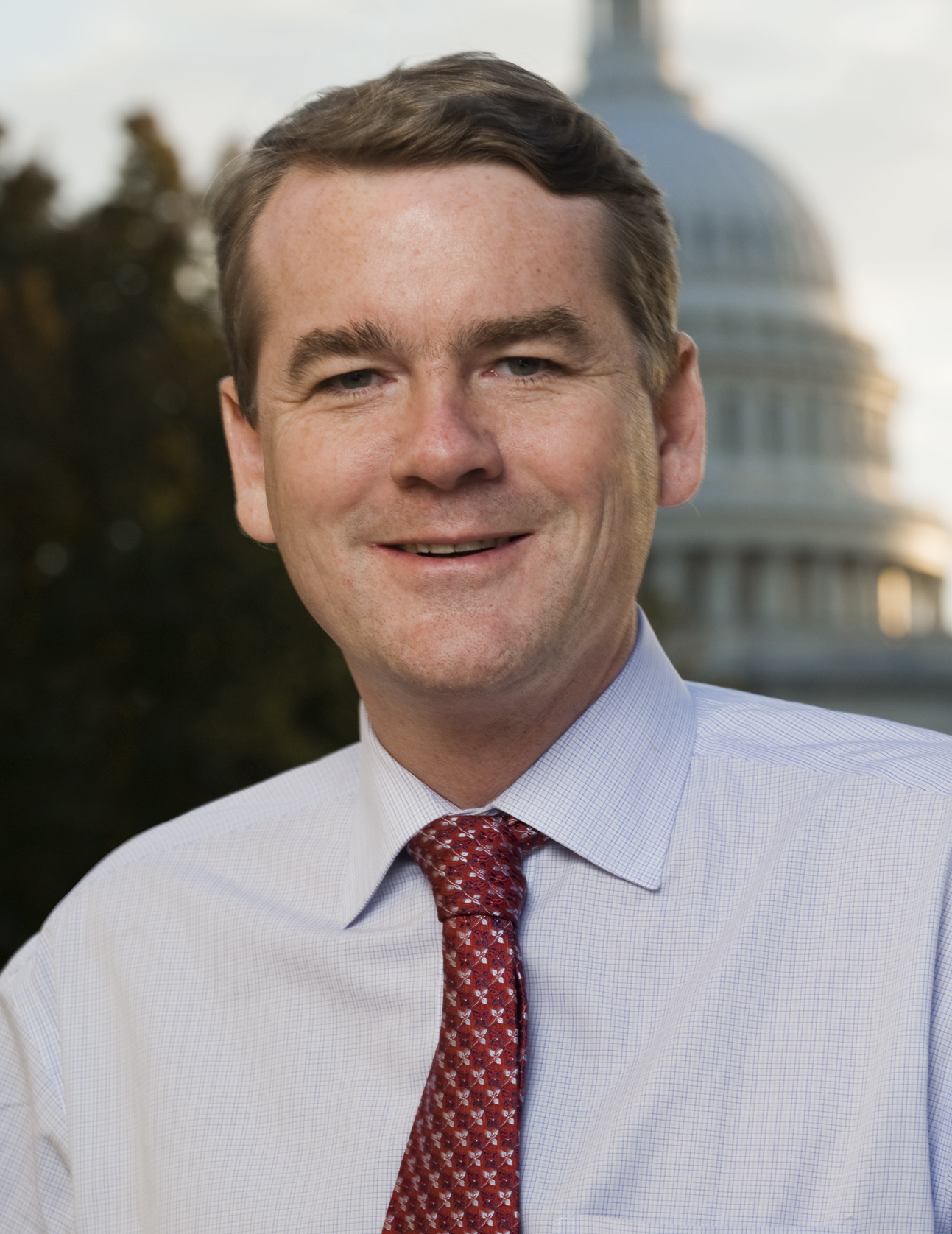
| Nominee | Michael Bennet | Darryl Glenn |
| Party | Democratic | Republican |
| Popular vote | 1,370,710 | 1,215,318 |
| Percentage | 50.0% | 44.3% |
- Bennet: 40–50% 50–60% 60–70% 70–80% Glenn: 40–50% 50–60% 60–70% 70–80%
U.S. senator before election
Michael Bennet
Democratic
Elected U.S. Senator
Michael Bennet
Democratic

One-term senator Michael Bennet (Democrat) was appointed in 2009 and elected to a full term with 48% of the vote in 2010. He was 51 years old in 2016. He ran for re-election.

Businessman Robert Blaha, former Aurora councilman Ryan Frazier, El Paso County Commissioners Darryl Glenn, and Peggy Littleton, former Colorado State University Athletic Director Jack Graham, State Representative Jon Keyser, former SBA director Greg Lopez, State Senator Tim Neville, and Jefferson County Commissioner Donald Rosier ran for the Republican nomination. Glenn, Graham, Blaha, Keyser, and Frazier actually competed in the primary.

Darryl Glenn won the Republican nomination with 37% of the vote against four other opponents.

Bennet won re-election with 50% of the vote to Glenn's 44%.

Colorado Democratic primary election
| Party | Candidate | Votes | % |
|---|---|---|---|
| Democratic | Michael Bennet (incumbent) | 262,344 | 100.00 |
| Total votes | | 262,344 | 100.00 |

Colorado Republican primary election
| Party | Candidate | Votes | % |
|---|---|---|---|
| Republican | Darryl Glenn | 131,125 | 37.74 |
| Republican | Jack Graham | 85,400 | 24.58 |
| Republican | Robert Blaha | 57,196 | 16.46 |
| Republican | Jon Keyser | 43,509 | 12.52 |
| Republican | Ryan Frazier | 30,241 | 8.70 |
| Total votes | | 347,471 | 100.00 |

Colorado general election
| Party | Candidate | Votes | % |
|---|---|---|---|
| Democratic | Michael Bennet (incumbent) | 1,370,710 | 49.97 |
| Republican | Darryl Glenn | 1,215,318 | 44.31 |
| Libertarian | Lily Tang Williams | 99,277 | 3.62 |
| Green | Arn Menconi | 36,805 | 1.34 |
| Unity | Bill Hammons | 9,336 | 0.34 |
| Independent | Dan Chapin | 8,361 | 0.30 |
| Independent | Paul Fiorino | 3,216 | 0.12 |
| Total votes | | 2,743,023 | 100.00 |
| Democratic hold | | | |

== Connecticut ==
Connecticut election
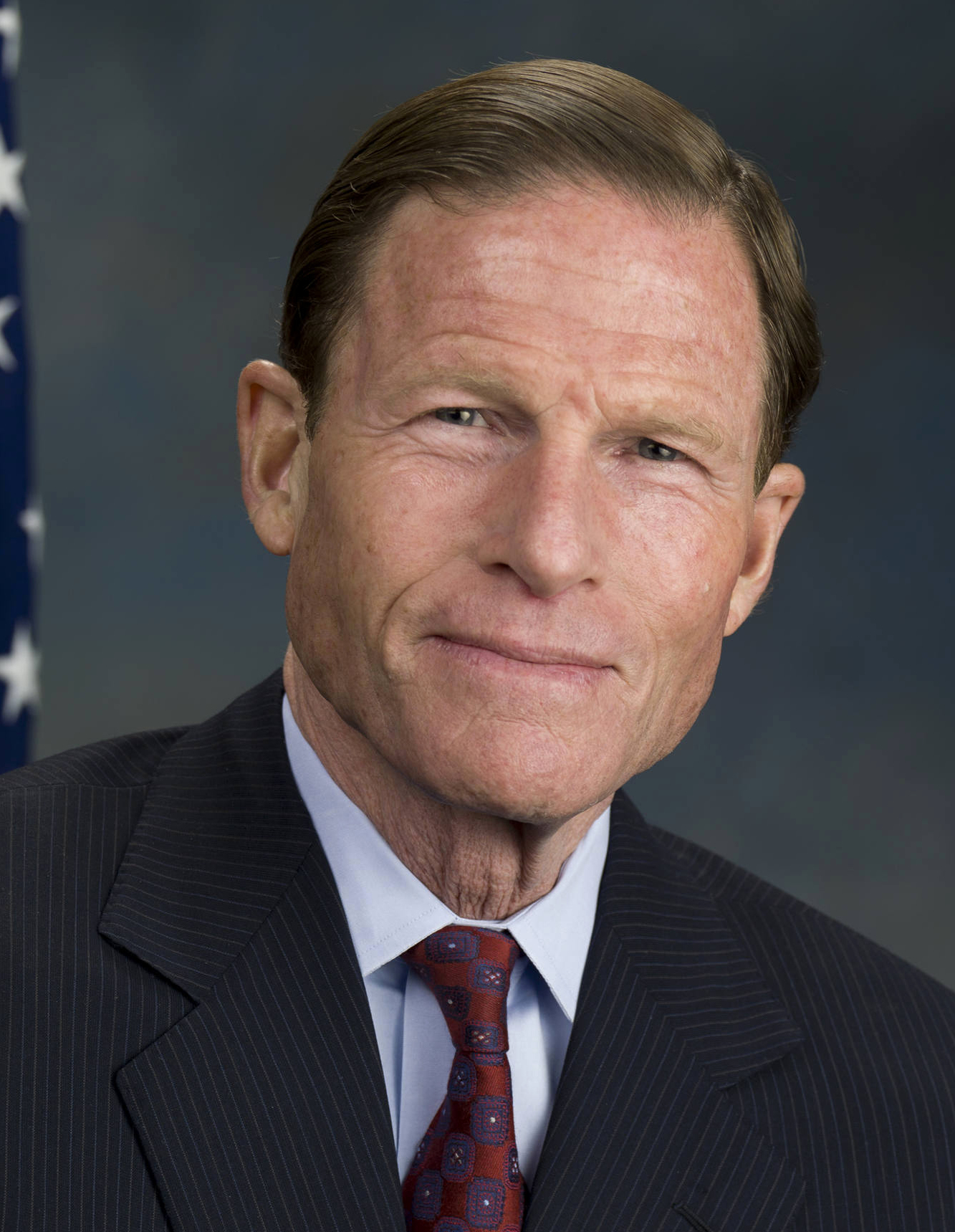

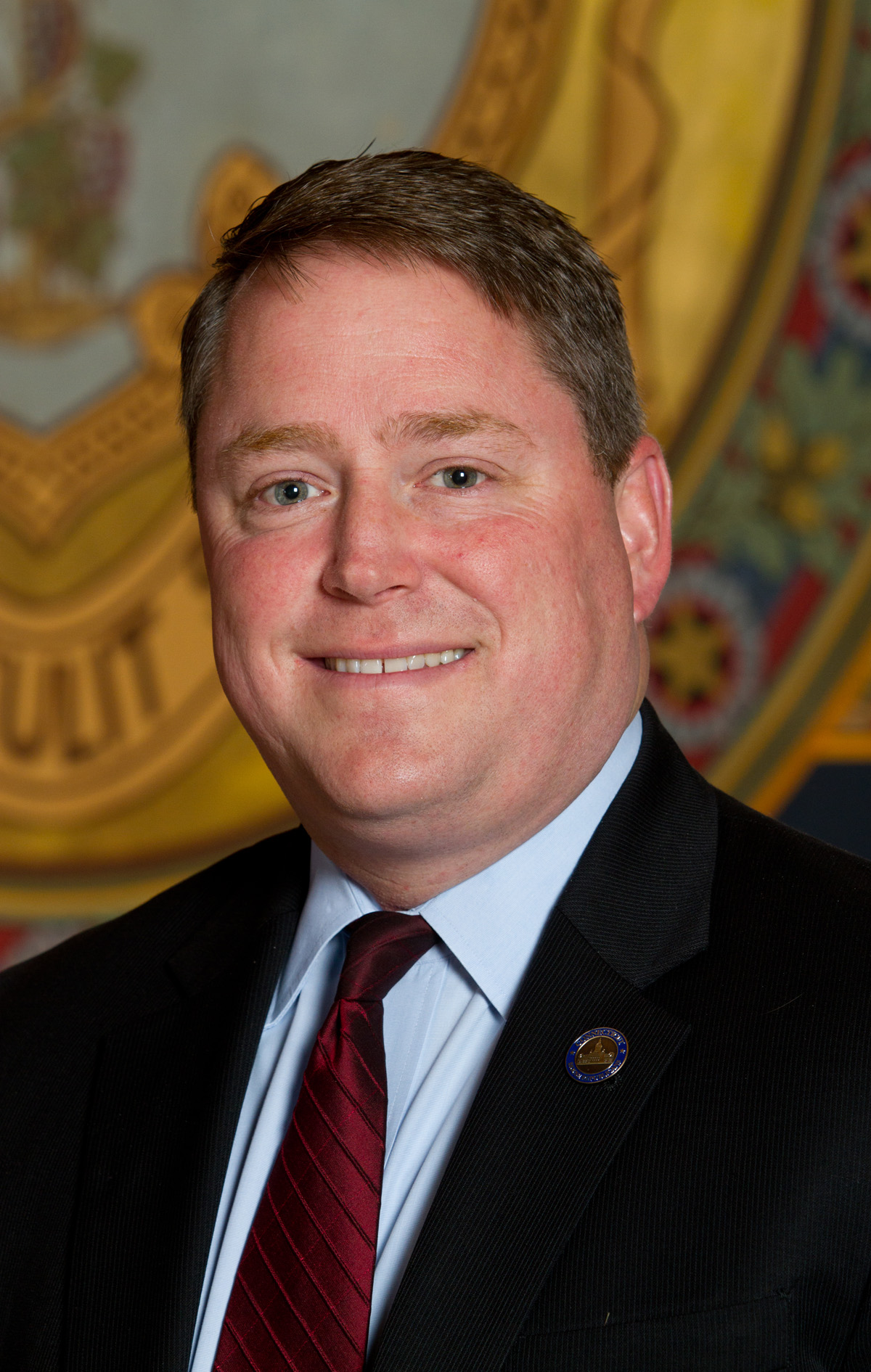
| Nominee | Richard Blumenthal | Dan Carter |
| Party | Democratic | Republican |
| Popular vote | 1,008,714 | 552,621 |
| Percentage | 63.2% | 34.6% |
- Blumenthal: 40–50% 50–60% 60–70% 70–80% 80–90% >90% Carter: 40–50% 50–60%
U.S. senator before election
Richard Blumenthal
Democratic
Elected U.S. Senator
Richard Blumenthal
Democratic

One-term senator Richard Blumenthal (Democrat) was elected with 55% of the vote in 2010. He was 70 years old in 2016. He ran for re-election.

State Representative Dan Carter, apparel company CEO and 2004 Senate nominee Jack Orchulli, and former Olympic athlete August Wolf ran for the Republican nomination. Another potential candidate was former West Hartford Town Councilor Joe Visconti, who ran for CT-01 in 2008 and ran as an independent for governor in 2014. Former U.S. Comptroller General and 2014 candidate for Lieutenant Governor David M. Walker, former U.S. representative and 2010 candidate Rob Simmons, and economist and former CNBC television host Lawrence Kudlow declined to run.

Blumenthal won re-election with 63% of the vote to Carter's 35%.

Connecticut general election
| Party | Candidate | Votes | % | ±% |
|---|---|---|---|---|
| Democratic | Richard Blumenthal | 920,766 | 57.68 | |
| Working Families | Richard Blumenthal | 87,948 | 5.51 | |
| Total | Richard Blumenthal (incumbent) | 1,008,714 | 63.19% | +7.95% |
| Republican | Dan Carter | 552,621 | 34.62 | −8.53% |
| Libertarian | Richard Lion | 18,190 | 1.14 | |
| Green | Jeffery Russell | 16,713 | 1.05 | |
| Write-In | Andrew Rule | 26 | 0.00 | |
| Write-In | John M. Traceski | 12 | 0.00 | |
| Majority | | 449,973 | 28.42 | |
| Total votes | | 1,596,276 | 100.00 | |
| Democratic hold | | | | |

== Florida ==
Florida election
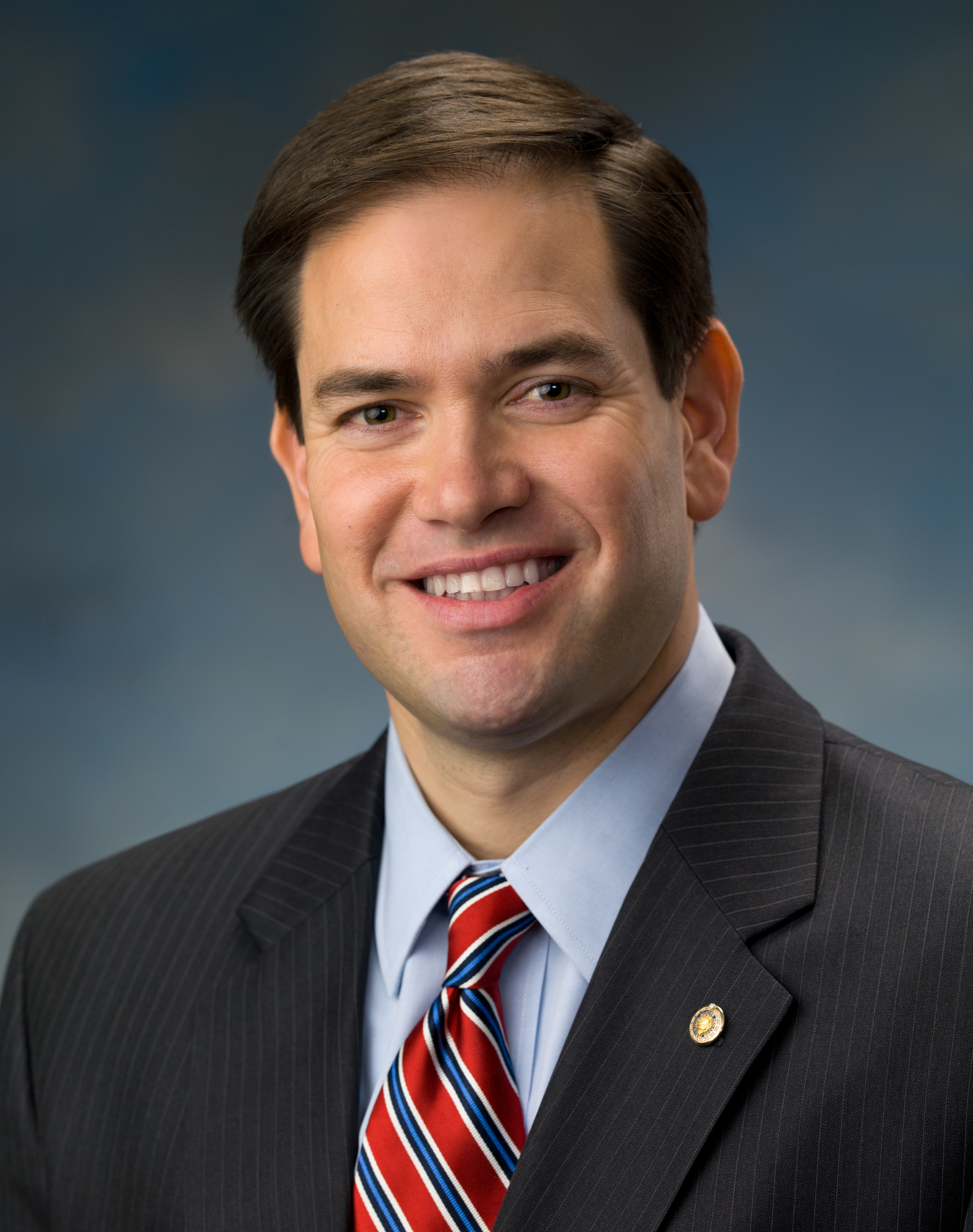

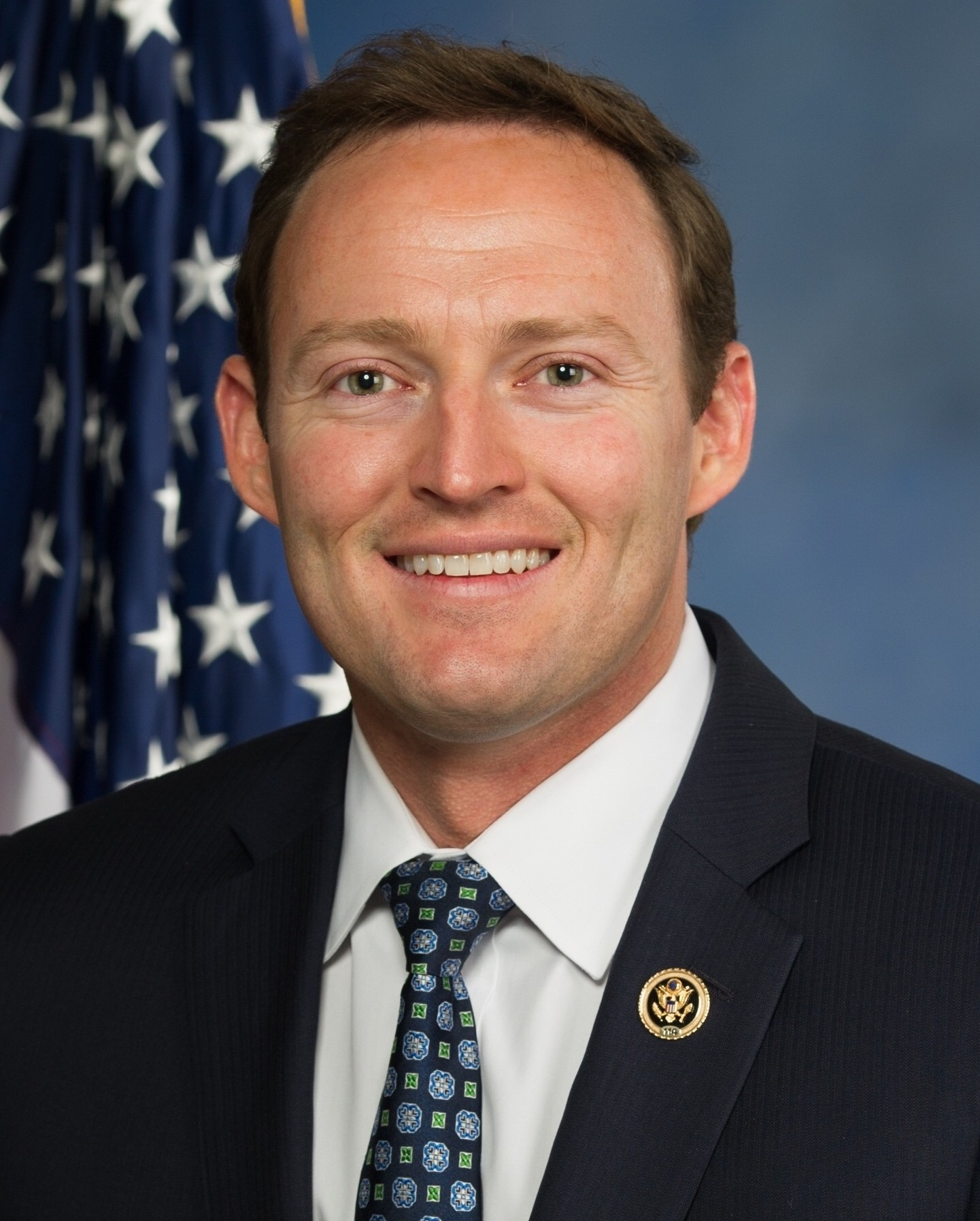
| Nominee | Marco Rubio | Patrick Murphy |
| Party | Republican | Democratic |
| Popular vote | 4,835,191 | 4,122,088 |
| Percentage | 52.0% | 44.3% |
- Rubio: 40–50% 50–60% 60–70% 70–80% 80–90% Murphy: 40–50% 50–60% 60–70%
U.S. senator before election
Marco Rubio
Republican
Elected U.S. Senator
Marco Rubio
Republican

One-term senator Marco Rubio (Republican) was elected in a three-way race with 49% of the vote in 2010. In April 2014, Rubio stated that he would not run for both the Senate and President in 2016, as Florida law prohibits a candidate from appearing twice on a ballot. In April 2015, he announced that he would run for President and would not seek re-election. After suspending his campaign on March 15, 2016, Rubio announced on June 22, 2016 that he had changed his mind and would run for re-election.

U.S. representative Ron DeSantis, combat veteran Todd Wilcox, real estate developer Carlos Beruff, retired college lecturer Ilya Katz, and Donald J. DeRenzo ran for the Republican nomination. Ben Carson, retired neurosurgeon and candidate for president in 2016, was also mentioned as a potential candidate. On June 17, 2016, U.S. representative David Jolly withdrew from the race to run for re-election to his House seat, four days after Rubio began openly considering reversing his decision to not run for re-election.

U.S. representative Patrick Murphy defeated fellow representative Alan Grayson, as well as Pam Keith, Lateresa Jones, Richard Coleman, Sam Brian Gibbons, and Josh Larose, for the Democratic nomination. Murphy lost to incumbent Marco Rubio in the November general election on November 8.

Sen. Rubio won re-election with 52% of the vote, compared to Murphy's 44%.

Florida Republican primary election
| Party | Candidate | Votes | % |
|---|---|---|---|
| Republican | Marco Rubio (incumbent) | 1,029,830 | 71.99 |
| Republican | Carlos Beruff | 264,427 | 18.49 |
| Republican | Dwight Young | 91,082 | 6.37 |
| Republican | Ernie Rivera | 45,153 | 3.16 |
| Total votes | | 1,430,492 | 100.00 |

Florida Democratic primary election
| Party | Candidate | Votes | % |
|---|---|---|---|
| Democratic | Patrick Murphy | 665,985 | 58.92 |
| Democratic | Alan Grayson | 199,929 | 17.72 |
| Democratic | Pam Keith | 173,919 | 15.40 |
| Democratic | Rocky De La Fuente | 60,810 | 5.38 |
| Democratic | Reginald Luster | 29,138 | 2.58 |
| Total votes | | 1,129,781 | 100.00 |

United States Senate election in Florida, 2016
| Party | Candidate | Votes | % | ±% |
|---|---|---|---|---|
| Republican | Marco Rubio (incumbent) | 4,835,191 | 51.98% | +3.09% |
| Democratic | Patrick Murphy | 4,122,088 | 44.31% | +24.11% |
| Libertarian | Paul Stanton | 196,956 | 2.12% | +1.66% |
| Independent | Bruce Nathan | 52,451 | 0.56% | N/A |
| Independent | Tony Khoury | 45,820 | 0.49% | N/A |
| Independent | Steven Machat | 26,918 | 0.29% | N/A |
| Independent | Basil E. Dalack | 22,236 | 0.24% | N/A |
| Write-in | | 160 | 0.00% | 0.00% |
| Total votes | | 9,301,820 | 100.00% | N/A |
| Republican hold | | | | |

== Georgia ==
Georgia election
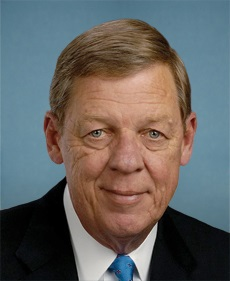

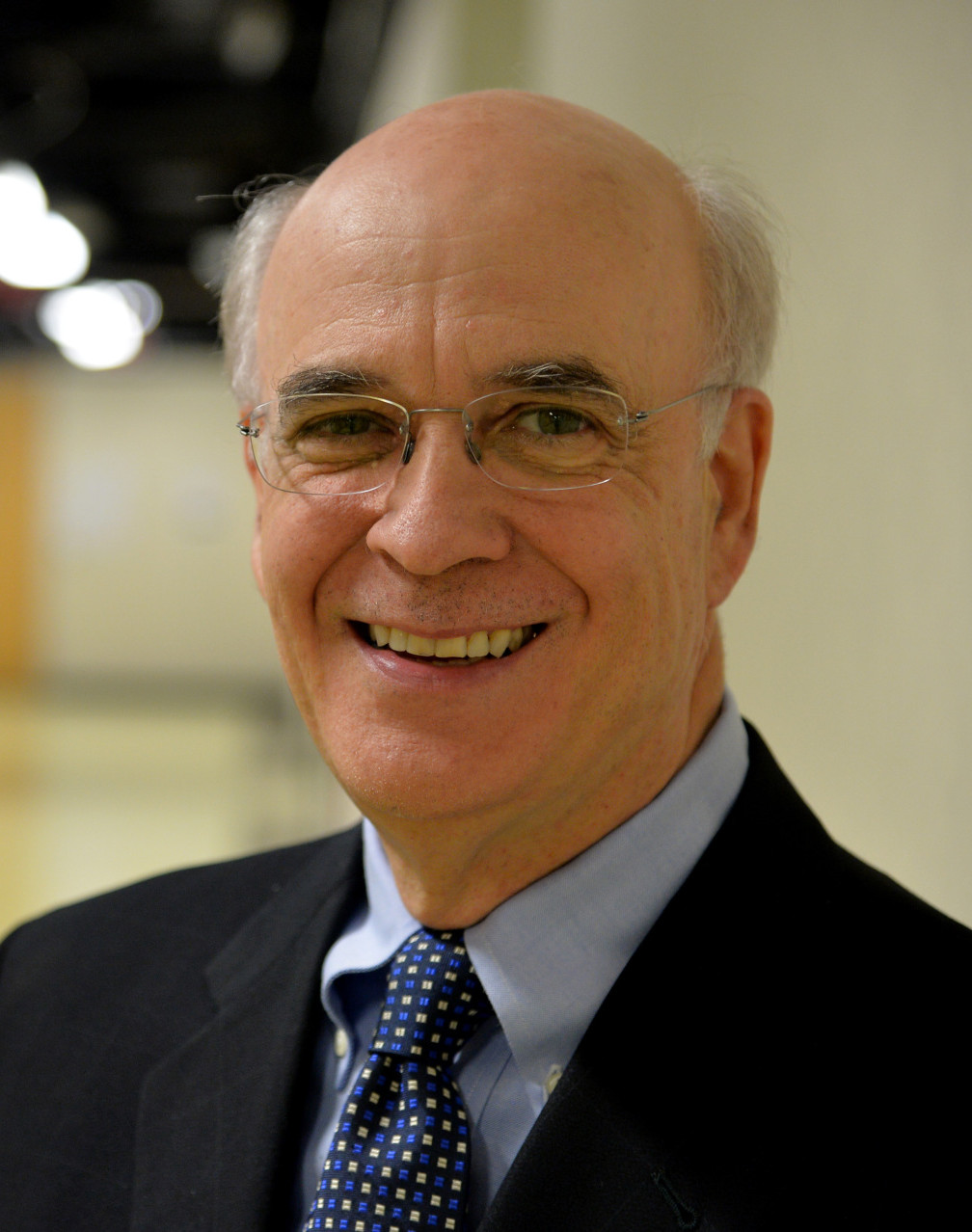
| Nominee | Johnny Isakson | Jim Barksdale |
| Party | Republican | Democratic |
| Popular vote | 2,135,806 | 1,599,726 |
| Percentage | 54.8% | 41.0% |
- Isakson: 40–50% 50–60% 60–70% 70–80% 80–90% Barksdale: 40–50% 50–60% 60–70% 70–80% 80–90%
U.S. senator before election
Johnny Isakson
Republican
Elected U.S. Senator
Johnny Isakson
Republican

Two-term senator Johnny Isakson (Republican) was re-elected with 58% of the vote in 2010. He was 71 years old in 2016. He ran for re-election. In 2015, Isakson announced he was being treated for Parkinson's disease, but stated that his treatment would not interfere with his re-election campaign or his ability to serve another term.

Mary Kay Bacallao, college professor, former Fayette County Board of Education member, and candidate for State Superintendent of Schools in 2014 and Derrick Grayson, candidate for the state's other Senate seat in 2014, challenged Isakson for the Republican nomination. Isakson won the Republican nomination with more than three quarters of the vote.

Investment firm executive Jim Barksdale, project manager Cheryl Copeland, and businessman John Coyne ran for the Democratic nomination. USAF veteran Jim Knox was running but dropped out of the race. Barksdale defeated Copeland in a close race to win the Democratic nomination.

Sen. Isakson won re-election with 55% to Barksdale's 41%.

Georgia Republican primary election
| Party | Candidate | Votes | % |
|---|---|---|---|
| Republican | Johnny Isakson (incumbent) | 447,661 | 77.50 |
| Republican | Derrick Grayson | 69,101 | 11.96 |
| Republican | Mary Kay Bacallao | 60,898 | 10.54 |
| Total votes | | 577,660 | 100.00 |

Georgia Democratic primary election
| Party | Candidate | Votes | % |
|---|---|---|---|
| Democratic | Jim Barksdale | 166,627 | 53.74 |
| Democratic | Cheryl Copeland | 130,822 | 42.19 |
| Democratic | John Coyne | 12,604 | 4.07 |
| Total votes | | 310,053 | 100.00 |

Georgia general election
| Party | Candidate | Votes | % |
|---|---|---|---|
| Republican | Johnny Isakson (incumbent) | 2,135,806 | 54.80 |
| Democratic | Jim Barksdale | 1,599,726 | 41.04 |
| Libertarian | Allen Buckley | 162,260 | 4.16 |
| Total votes | | 3,897,792 | 100.00 |
| Republican hold | | | |

== Hawaii ==
Hawaii election
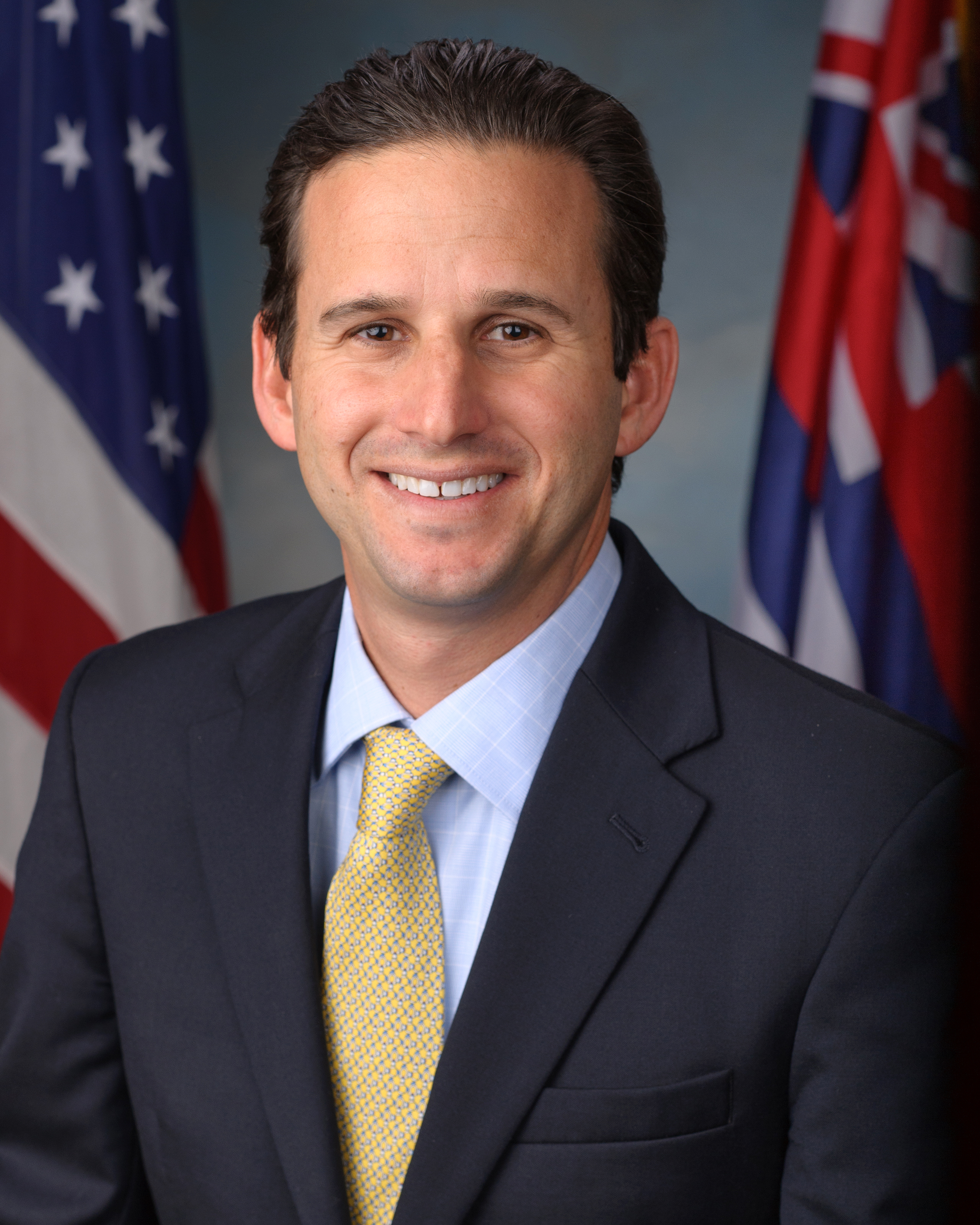

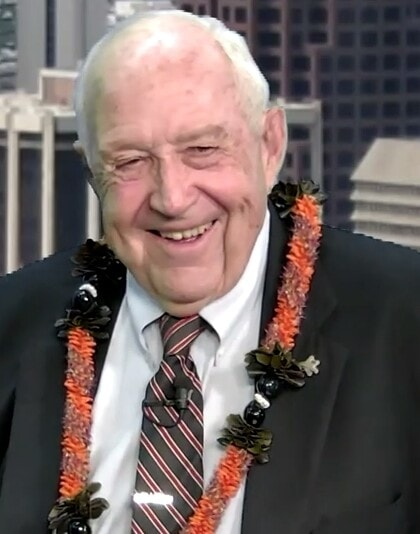
| Nominee | Brian Schatz | John Carroll |
| Party | Democratic | Republican |
| Popular vote | 306,604 | 92,653 |
| Percentage | 73.6% | 22.2% |
- County results Schatz: 70–80%
U.S. senator before election
Brian Schatz
Democratic
Elected U.S. Senator
Brian Schatz
Democratic

In 2012, Hawaii governor Neil Abercrombie appointed Lieutenant Governor Brian Schatz (Democrat) to take the place of deceased nine-term senator Daniel Inouye. Schatz won a 2014 special election to serve the remainder of Inouye's term. Schatz ran for re-election.

Former U.S. representative and 2014 Senate candidate Colleen Hanabusa considered challenging Schatz in the primary again, while U.S. representative Tulsi Gabbard declined to seek the Democratic nomination for the seat.

Charles Collins, a Republican who ran for the Senate in 2012 and for governor in 2014, was seeking the nomination again, but withdrew from the race.

Sen. Schatz won re-election with 74% of the vote, compared to Carroll's 22%.

Hawaii Democratic primary election
| Party | Candidate | Votes | % |
|---|---|---|---|
| Democratic | Brian Schatz (incumbent) | 162,891 | 86.17 |
| Democratic | Makani Christensen | 11,898 | 6.29 |
| Democratic | Miles Shiratori | 8,620 | 4.56 |
| Democratic | Arturo Reyes | 3,819 | 2.02 |
| Democratic | Tutz Honeychurch | 1,815 | 0.96 |
| Total votes | | 189,043 | 100.00 |

Hawaii Constitution primary election
| Party | Candidate | Votes | % |
|---|---|---|---|
| Constitution | Joy Allison | 217 | 100.00 |
| Total votes | | 217 | 100.00 |

Hawaii American Shopping primary election
| Party | Candidate | Votes | % |
|---|---|---|---|
| Independent | John Giuffre | 111 | 100.00 |
| Total votes | | 111 | 100.00 |

Hawaii general election
| Party | Candidate | Votes | % | ±% |
|---|---|---|---|---|
| Democratic | Brian Schatz (incumbent) | 306,604 | 70.1 | N/A |
| Republican | John Carroll | 92,653 | 21.2 | N/A |
| Constitution | Joy Allison | 9,103 | 2.1 | N/A |
| Libertarian | Michael Kokowski | 6,809 | 1.6 | N/A |
| Independent | John Giuffre | 1,393 | 0.3 | |
| | Blank votes | 20,763 | 4.7 | |
| | Over votes | 339 | 0.0 | |
| Majority | | 213,951 | 48.88 | |
| Total votes | | 437,664 | 100.0 | |
| Democratic hold | | Swing | | |

== Idaho ==
Idaho election
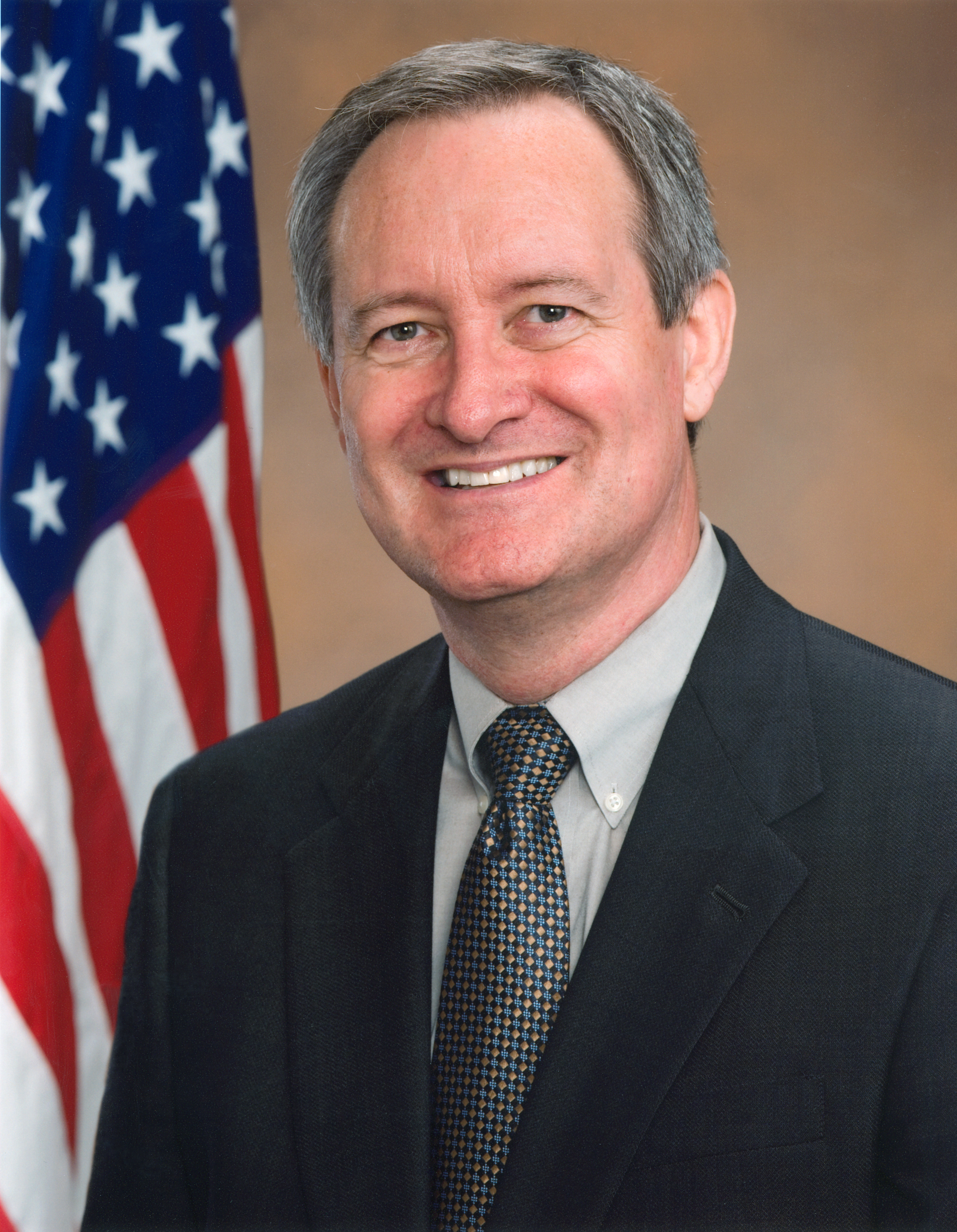
| Nominee | Mike Crapo | Jerry Sturgill |
| Party | Republican | Democratic |
| Popular vote | 449,017 | 188,249 |
| Percentage | 66.1% | 27.7% |
| Nominee | Ray Writz |
| Party | Constitution |
| Popular vote | 41,677 |
| Percentage | 6.1% |
- Crapo: 50–60% 60–70% 70–80% 80–90% Sturgill: 50–60%
U.S. senator before election
Mike Crapo
Republican
Elected U.S. Senator
Mike Crapo
Republican

Three-term senator Mike Crapo (Republican) was re-elected with 71% of the vote in 2010. Crapo was 65 years old in 2016. He ran for re-election. U.S Representative Raul Labrador declined to challenge Crapo in the Republican primary.

Jerry Sturgill ran for the Democratic nomination.

Perennial candidate Pro-Life ran as an independent. He was defeated in the Constitution Party primary on May 17, 2016 to Ray J. Writz.

Sen. Crapo was re-elected.

Idaho Republican primary election
| Party | Candidate | Votes | % |
|---|---|---|---|
| Republican | Mike Crapo (incumbent) | 119,633 | 100.00 |
| Total votes | | 119,633 | 100.00 |

Idaho Democratic primary election
| Party | Candidate | Votes | % |
|---|---|---|---|
| Democratic | Jerry Sturgill | 26,471 | 100.00 |
| Total votes | | 26,471 | 100.00 |

Idaho Constitution primary election
| Party | Candidate | Votes | % |
|---|---|---|---|
| Constitution | Ray J. Writz | 131 | 59.5 |
| Constitution | Pro-Life | 89 | 40.5 |
| Total votes | | 220 | 100.0 |

Idaho general election
| Party | Candidate | Votes | % | ±% |
|---|---|---|---|---|
| Republican | Mike Crapo (incumbent) | 449,017 | 66.13 | −5.06% |
| Democratic | Jerry Sturgill | 188,249 | 27.73 | +2.80% |
| Constitution | Ray J. Writz | 41,677 | 6.14 | +2.26% |
| Majority | | 260,768 | 38.40 | −7.84% |
| Total votes | | 678,943 | 100.0 | +51.06% |
| Republican hold | | Swing | | |

== Illinois ==
Illinois election
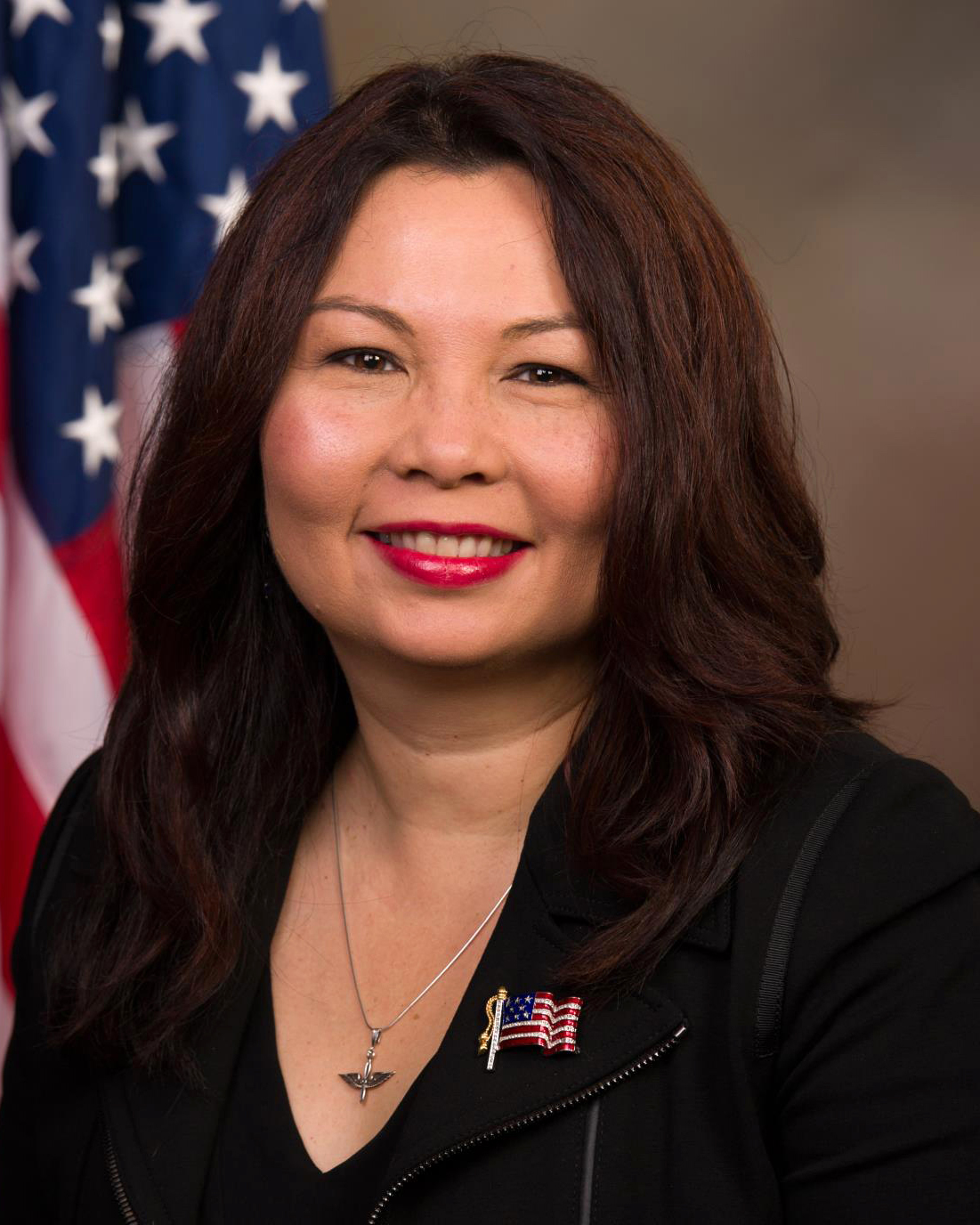

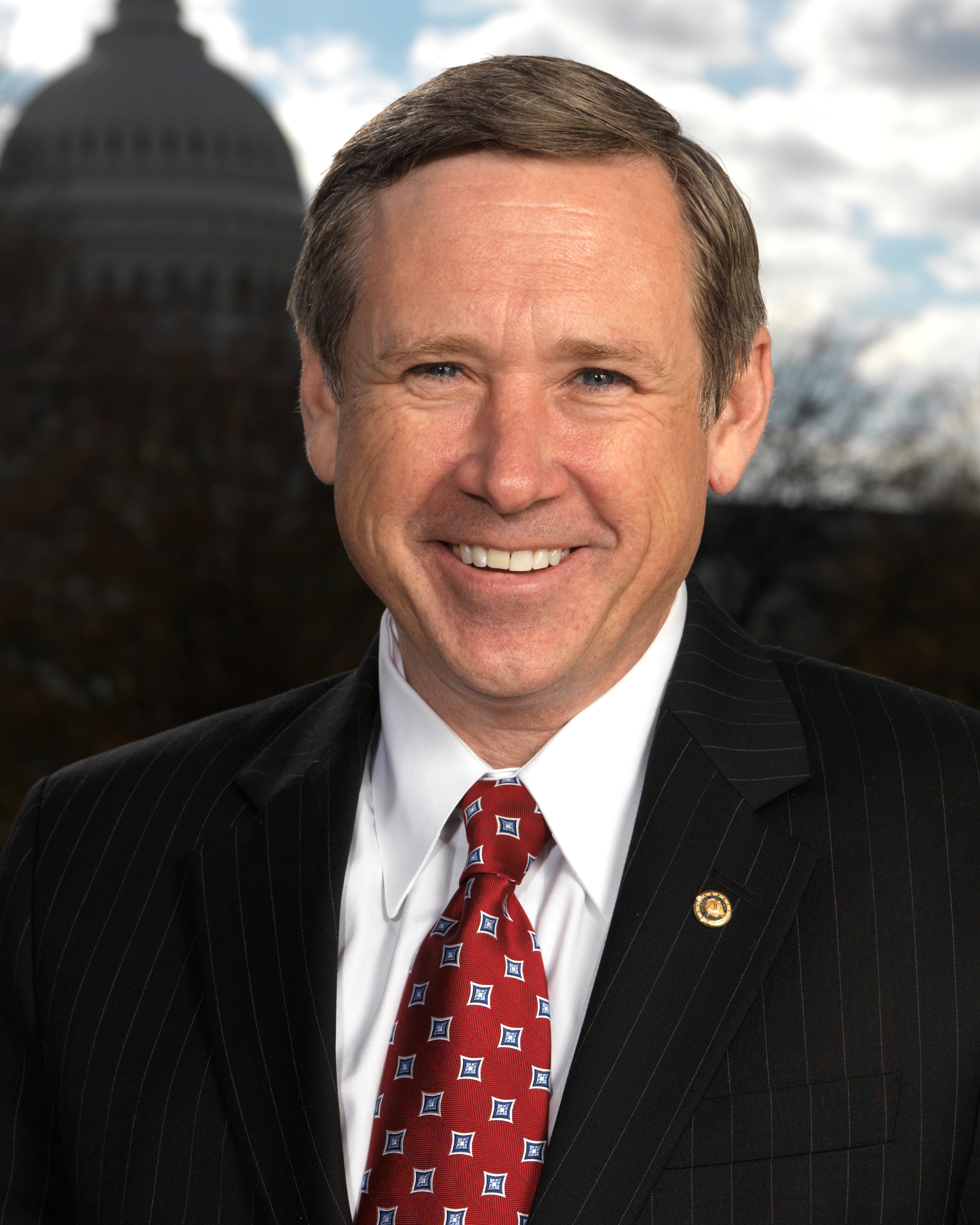
| Nominee | Tammy Duckworth | Mark Kirk |
| Party | Democratic | Republican |
| Popular vote | 3,012,940 | 2,184,693 |
| Percentage | 54.9% | 39.8% |
- Duckworth: 40-50% 50–60% 70–80% Kirk: 40–50% 50–60% 60–70% 70–80%
U.S. senator before election
Mark Kirk
Republican
Elected U.S. Senator
Tammy Duckworth
Democratic

One-term senator Mark Kirk (Republican) was elected with 48% of the vote in 2010. He was 57 years old in 2016. He ran for re-election. Kirk suffered a stroke in January 2012 that kept him away from the Senate until January 2013. In June 2013, he confirmed that he was planning to run for re-election, but speculation persisted that he might retire. In November 2014, Kirk reiterated that he was going to run for re-election, saying: "No frickin' way am I retiring."

Joe Walsh, a former U.S. representative and conservative talk radio host, declined to challenge Kirk in the Republican primary. Two others filed for the right to challenge Senator Kirk in the primary: businessman James Marter, and Elizabeth Pahlke, but Pahlke was disqualified, so only Marter was on the ballot running against Kirk. On March 15, Kirk won the primary with 71% of the vote.

U.S. representative Tammy Duckworth, President and CEO of the Chicago Urban League, Andrea Zopp, and State Senator Napoleon Harris ran for the Democratic nomination. On March 15, Duckworth won the primary with 64% of the vote.

In December 2015, Jim Brown, a teacher and former businessman, announced he was running as an independent.

Chris Aguayo, an Iraq/Afghan War veteran and Veterans Party State Chair, announced he was running, representing the Veterans Party.

Rep. Duckworth unseated Sen. Kirk with 55% compared to his 40%.

Illinois Republican primary election
| Party | Candidate | Votes | % | ±% |
|---|---|---|---|---|
| Republican | Mark Kirk (incumbent) | 931,619 | 70.6 | +14.0% |
| Republican | James T. Marter | 388,571 | 29.4 | N/A |
| Majority | | 543,048 | 41.2 | +3.9% |
| Turnout | | 1,320,191 | | +77.9% |

Illinois Democratic primary election
| Party | Candidate | Votes | % |
|---|---|---|---|
| Democratic | Tammy Duckworth | 1,220,128 | 64.38 |
| Democratic | Andrea Zopp | 455,729 | 24.05 |
| Democratic | Napoleon Harris | 219,286 | 11.57 |
| Total votes | | 1,859,257 | 100.00 |

Illinois general election
| Party | Candidate | Votes | % | ±% |
|---|---|---|---|---|
| Democratic | Tammy Duckworth | 3,012,940 | 54.9 | +8.5% |
| Republican | Mark Kirk (incumbent) | 2,184,692 | 39.8 | −8.2% |
| Libertarian | Kenton McMillen | 175,988 | 3.2 | +0.8% |
| Green | Scott Summers | 117,619 | 2.1 | −1.1% |
| Write-In | Chad Koppie | 408 | .007 | N/A |
| Write-In | Jim Brown | 106 | .002 | N/A |
| Write-In | Christopher Aguayo | 77 | .001 | N/A |
| Write-In | Susana Sandoval | 42 | .0008 | N/A |
| Write-In | Eric Kufi James Stewart | 5 | .00009 | N/A |
| Write-In | Patricia Beard | 1 | .00002 | N/A |
| Majority | | 828,248 | 15.1 | +13.5% |
| Turnout | | 5,491,878 | | +48.2% |
| Democratic gain from Republican | | Swing | | |

== Indiana ==
Indiana election
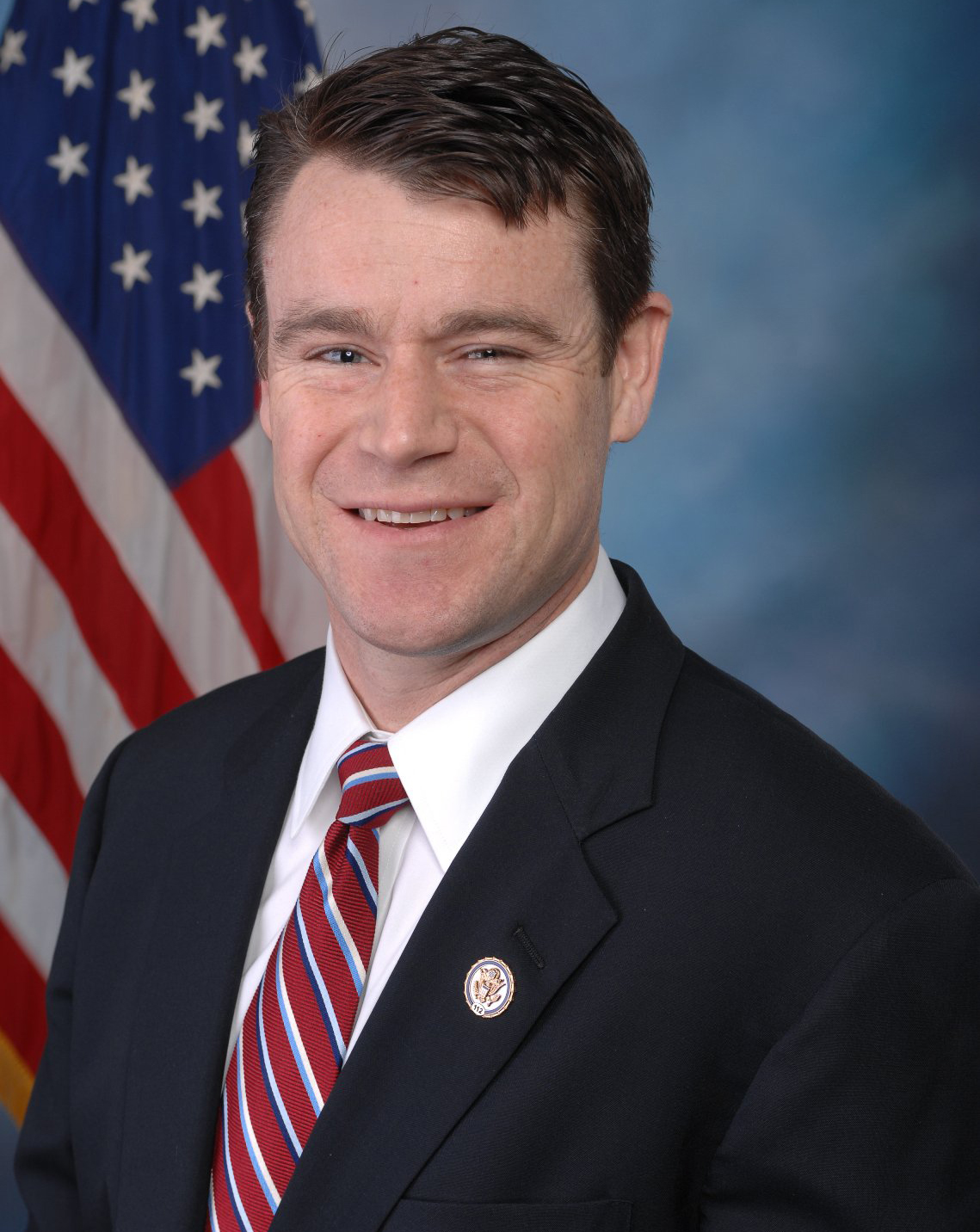

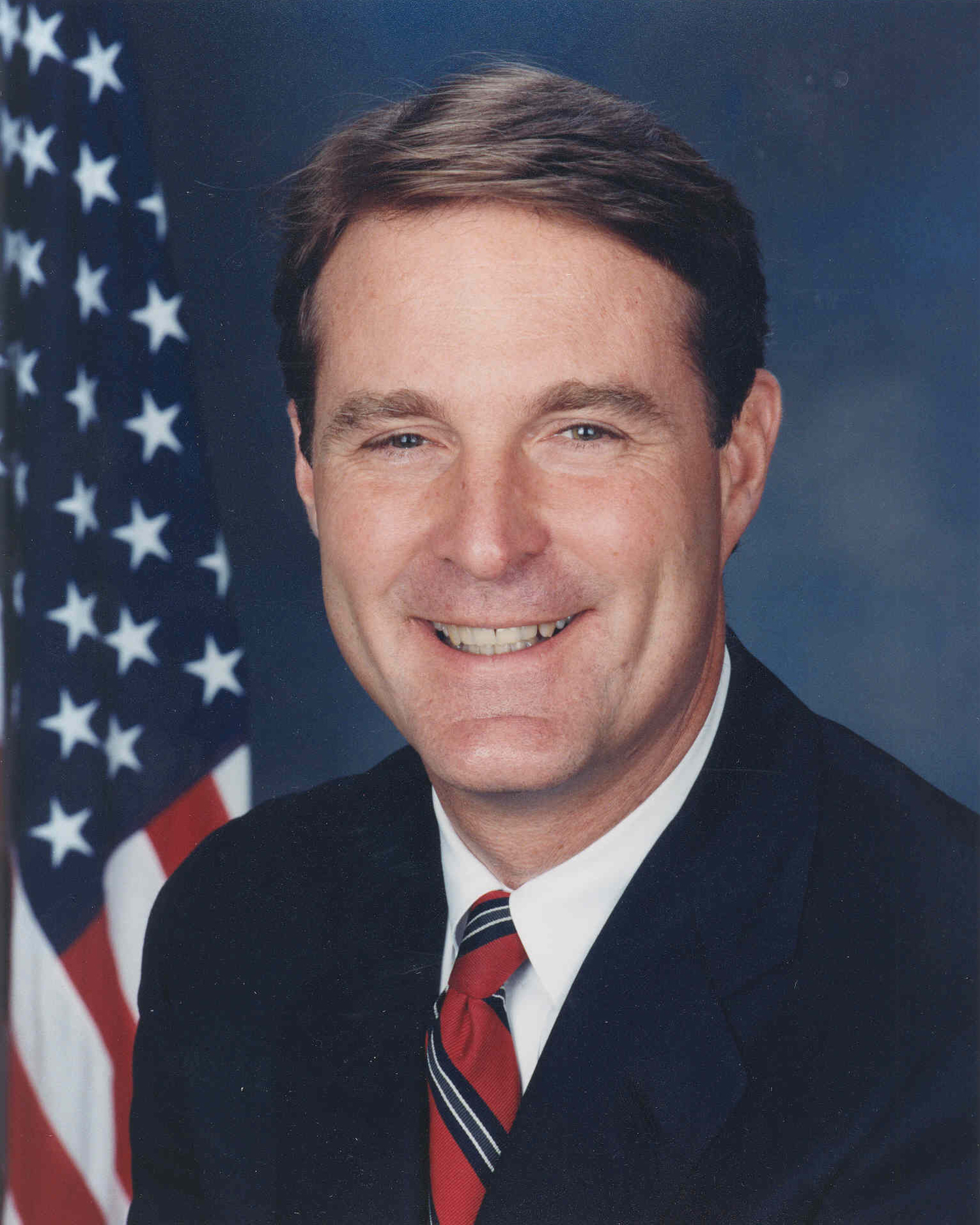
| Nominee | Todd Young | Evan Bayh |
| Party | Republican | Democratic |
| Popular vote | 1,423,991 | 1,158,974 |
| Percentage | 52.1% | 42.4% |
| Nominee | Lucy Brenton |
| Party | Libertarian |
| Popular vote | 149,481 |
| Percentage | 5.5% |
- Young: 40–50% 50–60% 60–70% 70–80% Bayh: 40–50% 50–60% 60–70%
U.S. senator before election
Dan Coats
Republican
Elected U.S. Senator
Todd Young
Republican

Three-term senator Dan Coats (Republican) was elected with 55% of the vote in 2010; Coats served in the Senate from 1989 to 1999 and then returned to serve another term from 2011 to 2017. Coats did not run for re-election. Republican candidates included U.S. representatives Marlin Stutzman and Todd Young. Coats's chief of staff Eric Holcomb was a candidate, but withdrew from the race.

Former U.S. representative Baron Hill won the Democratic nomination on May 3, but withdrew in July 2016 in favor of Evan Bayh. Bayh held the seat from 1999 until his retirement in 2011, and also served as governor of Indiana from 1989 to 1997. Former non-profit director John Dickerson also announced he was going to run, but suspended his campaign in early 2016.

Former Sen. Bayh lost his bid to regain his seat to Rep. Young, who garnered 52% to Bayh's 42%.

Indiana Republican primary election
| Party | Candidate | Votes | % |
|---|---|---|---|
| Republican | Todd Young | 661,136 | 67.0 |
| Republican | Marlin Stutzman | 324,429 | 33.0 |
| Total votes | | 985,565 | 100.0 |

Indiana Democratic primary election
| Party | Candidate | Votes | % |
|---|---|---|---|
| Democratic | Baron Hill | 516,183 | 100.00 |
| Total votes | | 516,183 | 100.00 |

Indiana general election
| Party | Candidate | Votes | % |
|---|---|---|---|
| Republican | Todd Young | 1,423,991 | 52.11 |
| Democratic | Evan Bayh | 1,158,947 | 42.41 |
| Libertarian | Lucy Brenton | 149,481 | 5.47 |
| Write-in | James L. Johnson Jr. | 127 | 0.01 |
| Majority | | 265,044 | 9.70 |
| Total votes | | 2,732,573 | 100.00 |
| Republican hold | | | |

== Iowa ==
Iowa election
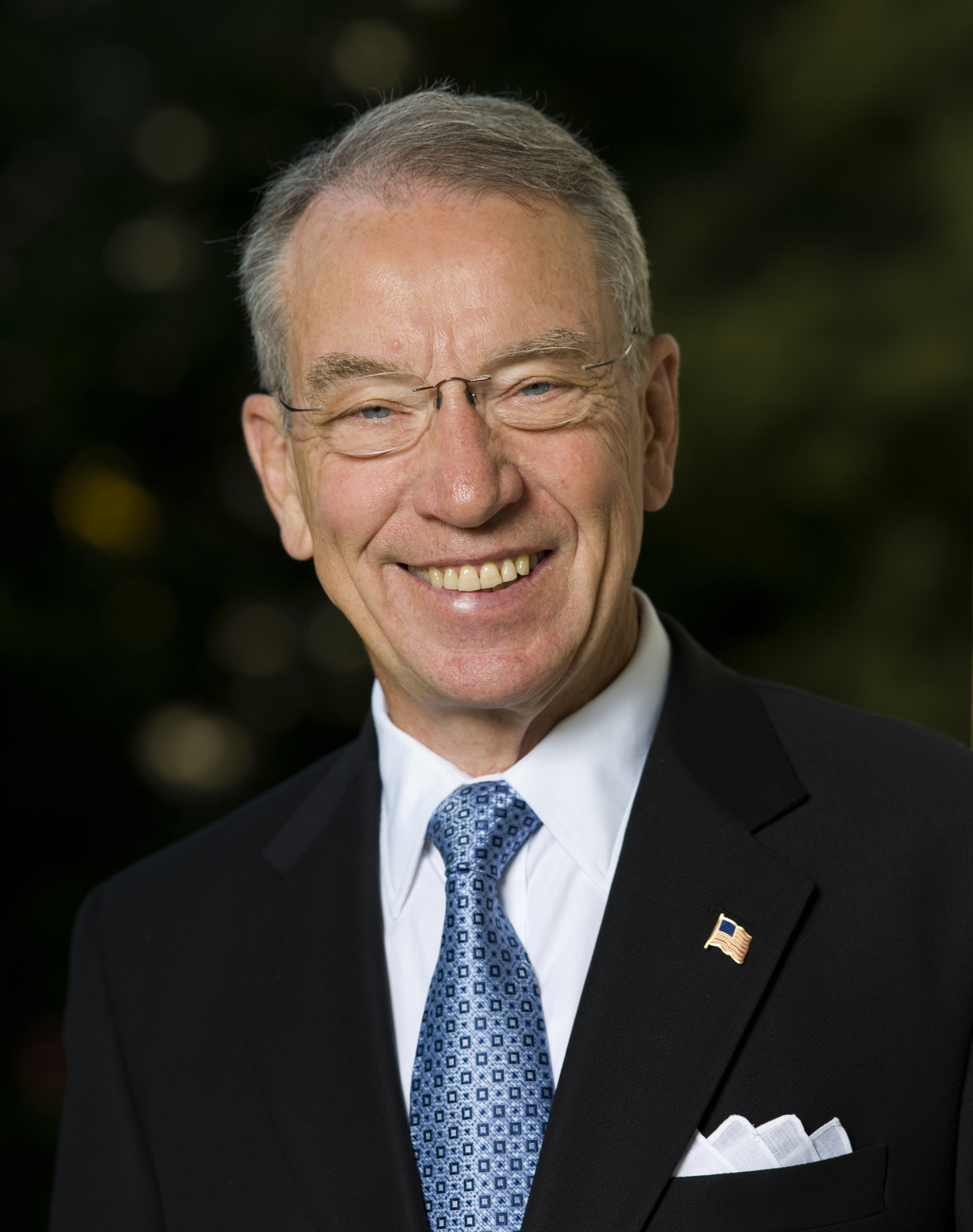

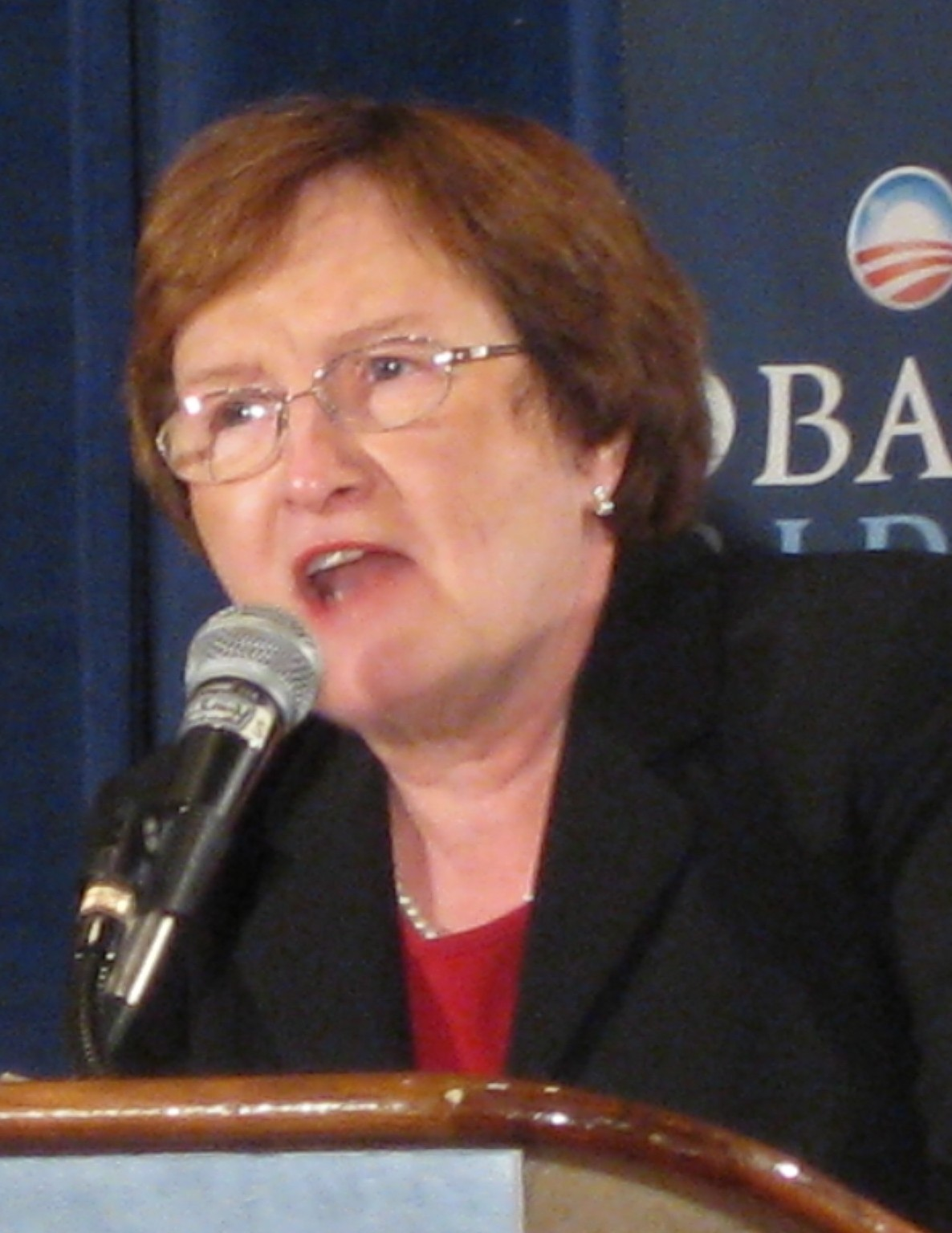
| Nominee | Chuck Grassley | Patty Judge |
| Party | Republican | Democratic |
| Popular vote | 926,007 | 549,460 |
| Percentage | 60.1% | 35.7% |
- Grassley: 50–60% 60–70% 70–80% 80–90% Judge: 50–60%
U.S. senator before election
Chuck Grassley
Republican
Elected U.S. Senator
Chuck Grassley
Republican

Six-term senator Chuck Grassley was re-elected with 65% of the vote in 2010. He was 83 years old in 2016. He ran for re-election. Talk radio host Robert Rees announced he was going to challenge Grassley for the nomination, but later withdrew.

Former Lt Governor Patty Judge earned the Democratic nomination by defeating State Senator Rob Hogg, former state senator Tom Fiegen, and former state representative Bob Krause. Former state representative Ray Zirkelbach briefly ran but ended his campaign soon after.

Sen. Grassley won re-election with 60% to Judge's 36%.

Iowa Republican primary election
| Party | Candidate | Votes | % |
|---|---|---|---|
| Republican | Chuck Grassley (incumbent) | 90,089 | 98.36 |
| Republican | Write-ins | 1,500 | 1.64 |
| Total votes | | 91,589 | 100.00 |

Iowa Democratic primary election
| Party | Candidate | Votes | % |
|---|---|---|---|
| Democratic | Patty Judge | 46,322 | 47.62 |
| Democratic | Rob Hogg | 37,801 | 38.86 |
| Democratic | Tom Fiegen | 6,573 | 6.76 |
| Democratic | Bob Krause | 6,425 | 6.60 |
| Democratic | Write-ins | 154 | 0.16 |
| Total votes | | 97,275 | 100.00 |

Iowa general election
| Party | Candidate | Votes | % | ±% |
|---|---|---|---|---|
| Republican | Chuck Grassley (incumbent) | 926,007 | 60.09 | −4.26% |
| Democratic | Patty Judge | 549,460 | 35.66 | +2.36% |
| Libertarian | John Heiderscheit | 41,794 | 2.71 | +0.44% |
| Independent | Jim Hennager | 17,649 | 1.15 | N/A |
| Independent | Michael Luick-Thrams | 4,441 | 0.29 | N/A |
| Write-ins | | 1,685 | 0.11 | +0.03% |
| Majority | | 376,547 | 24.43 | −6.62% |
| Turnout | | 1,541,036 | | |
| Republican hold | | Swing | | |

== Kansas ==
Kansas election
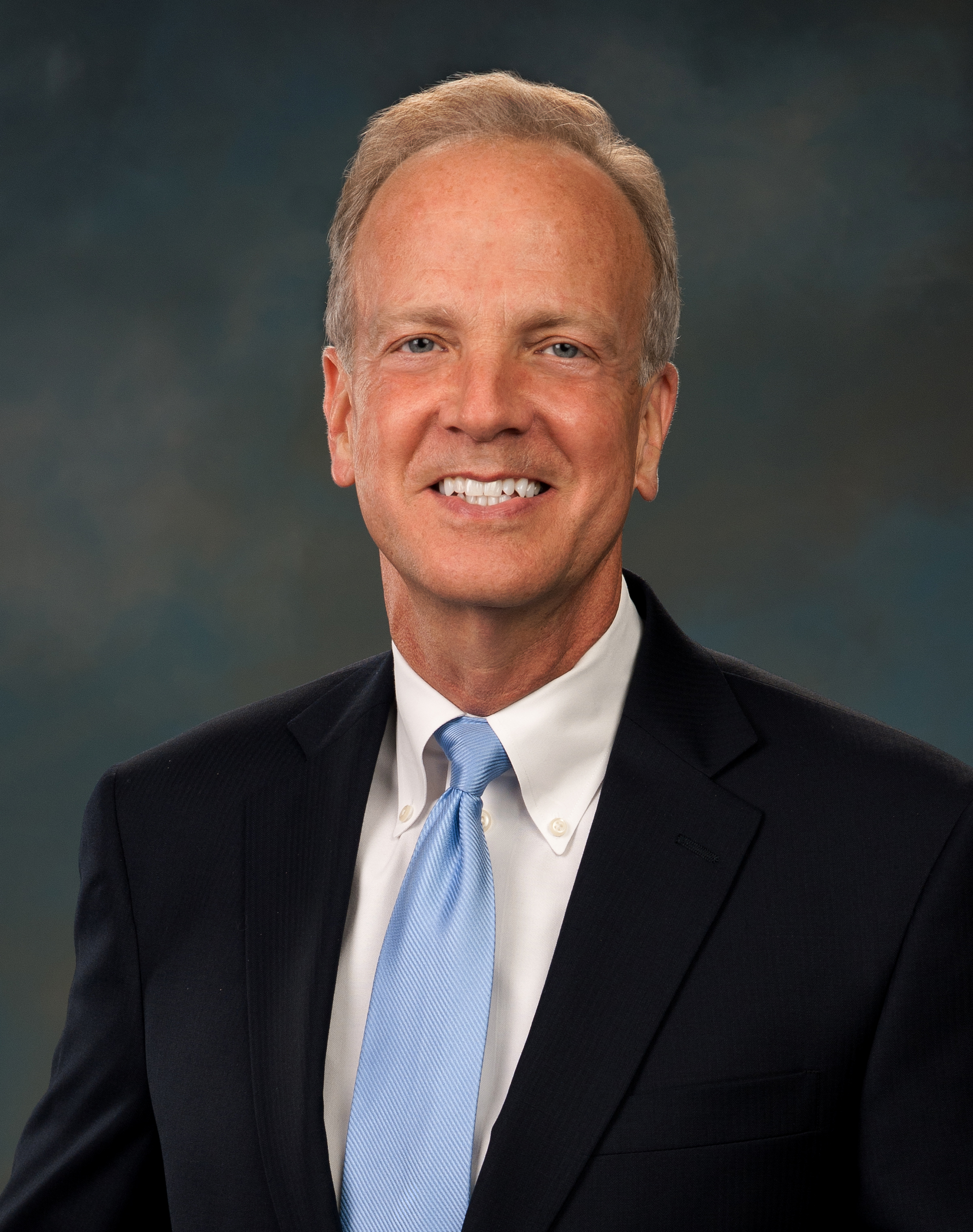

| Nominee | Jerry Moran | Patrick Wiesner |
| Party | Republican | Democratic |
| Popular vote | 732,376 | 379,740 |
| Percentage | 62.2% | 32.2% |
| Nominee | Robert Garrard |
| Party | Libertarian |
| Popular vote | 65,760 |
| Percentage | 5.6% |
- Moran: 50–60% 60–70% 70–80% 80–90% >90% Wiesner: 60–70%
U.S. senator before election
Jerry Moran
Republican
Elected U.S. Senator
Jerry Moran
Republican

One-term senator Jerry Moran (Republican) was elected with 70% of the vote in 2010. He was 62 years old in 2016. He ran for re-election. Radiologist and 2014 Senate candidate Milton R. Wolf and U.S. representative Tim Huelskamp declined to run.

Patrick Wiesner, an attorney and a candidate for the Senate in 2010 and 2014, defeated Monique Singh-Bey for the Democratic nomination. Potential candidates who declined to run included Wichita Mayor Carl Brewer, 2014 governor nominee Paul Davis, former Kansas City Mayor Joe Reardon, former U.S. representative and 2008 nominee Jim Slattery, and 2014 KS-02 nominee Margie Wakefield.

Sen. Moran won re-election with 62% to Wiesner's 32%.

Republican primary results
| Party | Candidate | Votes | % |
|---|---|---|---|
| Republican | Jerry Moran (incumbent) | 230,907 | 79.09 |
| Republican | D.J. Smith | 61,056 | 20.91 |
| Total votes | | 291,963 | 100.00 |

Democratic primary results
| Party | Candidate | Votes | % |
|---|---|---|---|
| Democratic | Patrick Wiesner | 59,522 | 62.94 |
| Democratic | Monique Singh-Bey | 35,042 | 37.06 |
| Total votes | | 94,564 | 100.00 |

Libertarian primary
| Party | Candidate | Votes | % |
|---|---|---|---|
| Libertarian | Robert Garrard | | 100.00 |
| Total votes | | | 100.00 |

Kansas general election
| Party | Candidate | Votes | % | ±% |
|---|---|---|---|---|
| Republican | Jerry Moran (incumbent) | 732,376 | 62.18 | −8.16% |
| Democratic | Patrick Wiesner | 379,740 | 32.24 | +6.08% |
| Libertarian | Robert D. Garrard | 65,760 | 5.58 | +3.46% |
| Independent | DJ Smith | 46 | 0.00 | N/A |
| Majority | | 352,636 | 29.94 | |
| Total votes | | 1,177,922 | 100.00 | |
| Republican hold | | Swing | | |

== Kentucky ==
Kentucky election
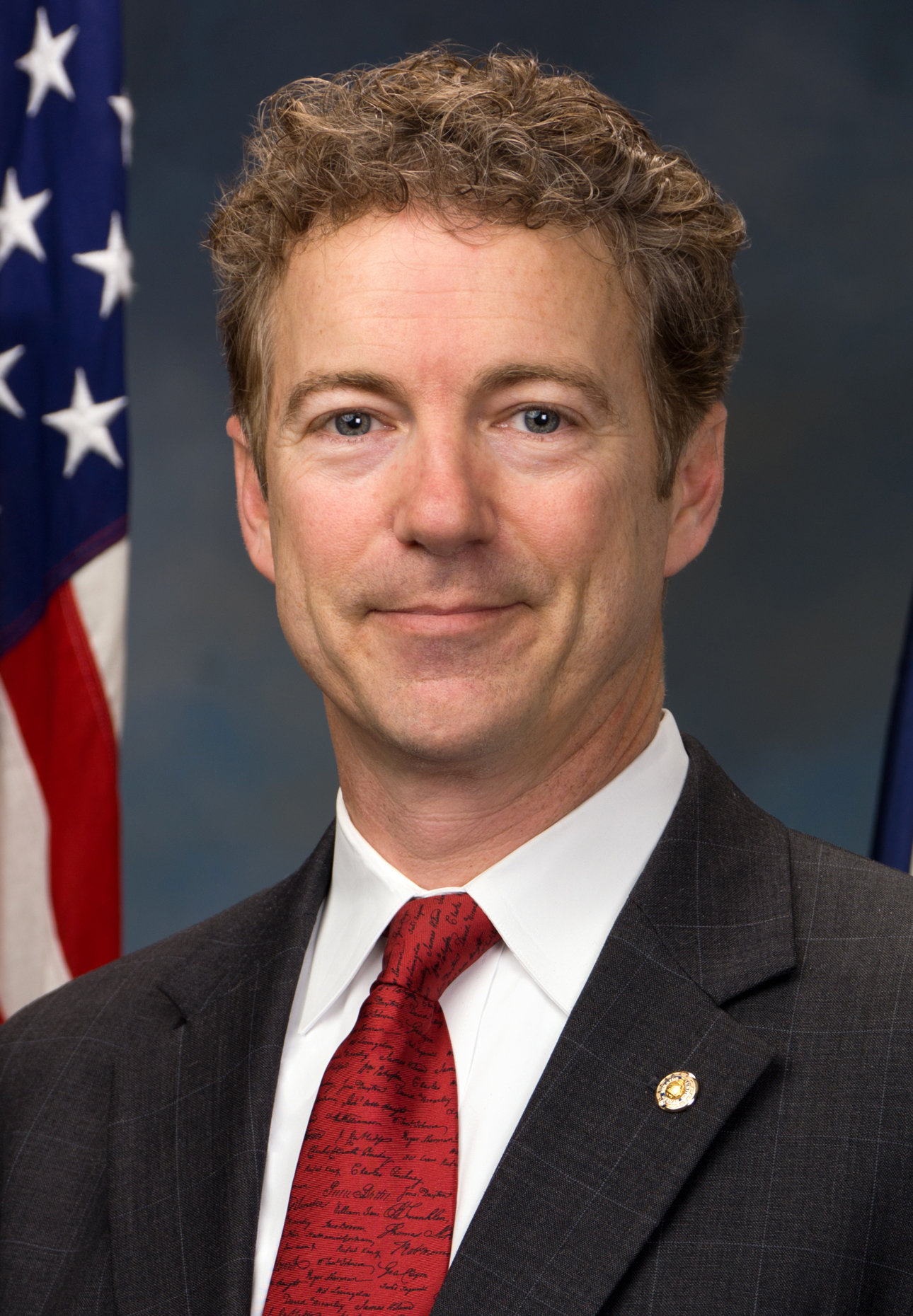

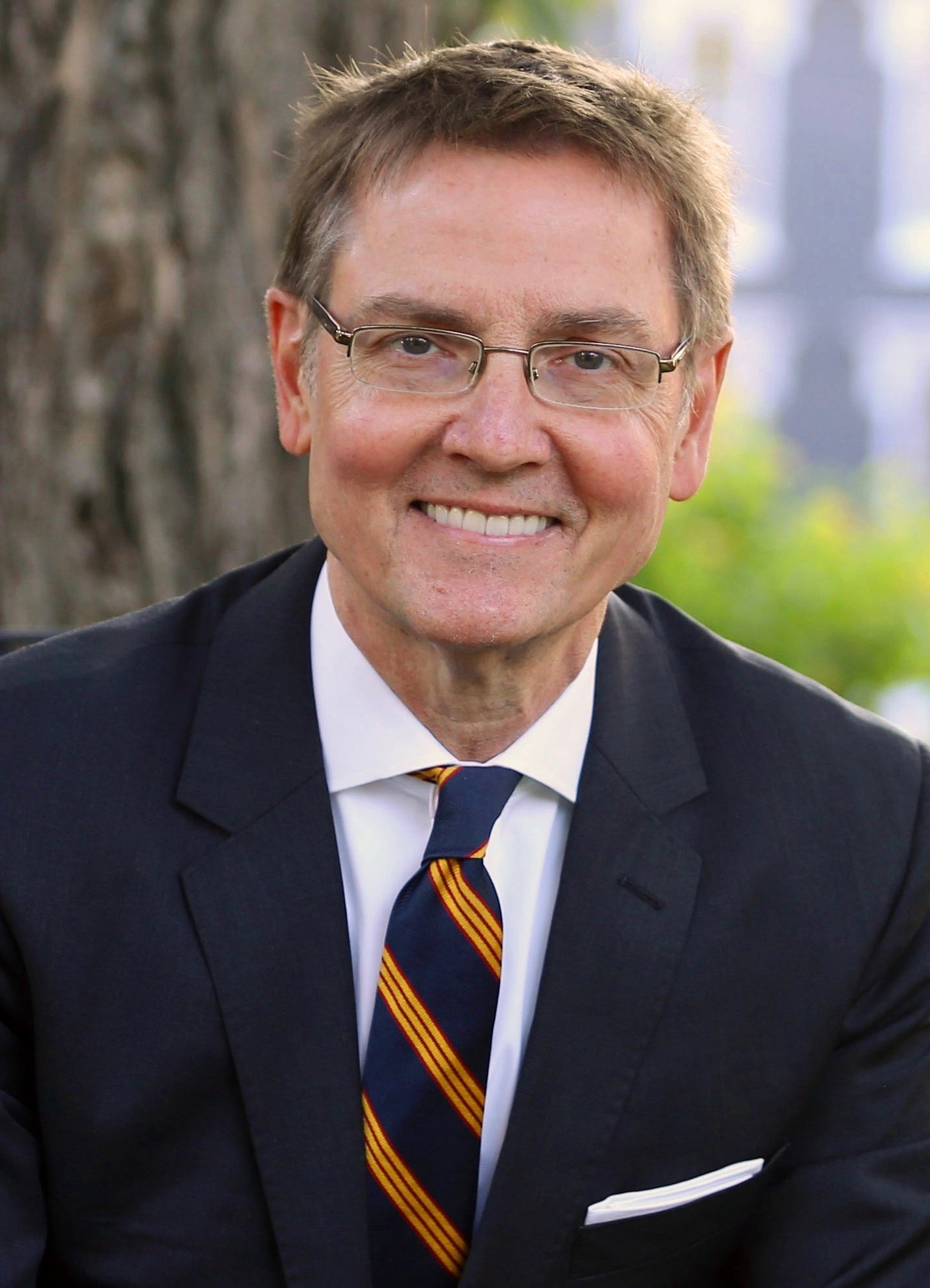
| Nominee | Rand Paul | Jim Gray |
| Party | Republican | Democratic |
| Popular vote | 1,090,177 | 813,246 |
| Percentage | 57.3% | 42.7% |
- Paul: 50–60% 60–70% 70–80% 80–90% Gray: 50–60% 60–70%
U.S. senator before election
Rand Paul
Republican
Elected U.S. Senator
Rand Paul
Republican

One-term senator Rand Paul (Republican) was elected with 56% of the vote in 2010. He was 53 years old in 2016. Paul filed for re-election, although he was also running for president of the United States in 2016. Although Kentucky law did not allow for a candidate to appear twice on the same ballot, Paul successfully convinced the Kentucky GOP to adopt a caucus system for 2016, allowing Paul to run for president and for the Senate simultaneously. Kentucky law still bars Paul from appearing twice on the ballot in the general election. However, on February 3, 2016, Paul ended his campaign for the presidency and ran for reelection. James Gould and Stephen Slaughter filed to run against Paul. Paul won the Republican primary, receiving 169,180 votes (about 85%); James R. Gould received 16,611 (about 8%) and Stephen Howard Slaughter received 13,728 (about 7%).

Lexington Mayor Jim Gray, Rory Houlihan, Ron Leach, Sellus Wilder Jeff Kender, Tom Recktenwald (who was a candidate in 2014), and Grant Short ran for the Democratic nomination. Gray won the nomination.

Paul won re-election with 57% of the vote to Gray's 43%.

Kentucky Republican primary election
| Party | Candidate | Votes | % |
|---|---|---|---|
| Republican | Rand Paul (incumbent) | 169,180 | 84.79 |
| Republican | James Gould | 16,611 | 8.33 |
| Republican | Stephen Slaughter | 13,728 | 6.88 |
| Total votes | | 199,519 | 100.00 |

Kentucky Democratic primary election
| Party | Candidate | Votes | % |
|---|---|---|---|
| Democratic | Jim Gray | 240,613 | 58.73 |
| Democratic | Sellus Wilder | 52,728 | 12.87 |
| Democratic | Ron Leach | 39,026 | 9.53 |
| Democratic | Tom Recktenwald | 21,910 | 5.35 |
| Democratic | Grant Short | 21,558 | 5.26 |
| Democratic | Jeff Kender | 20,239 | 4.94 |
| Democratic | Rory Houlihan | 13,585 | 3.32 |
| Total votes | | 409,659 | 100.00 |

Kentucky general election
| Party | Candidate | Votes | % | ±% |
|---|---|---|---|---|
| Republican | Rand Paul (incumbent) | 1,090,177 | 57.27 | +1.58% |
| Democratic | Jim Gray | 813,246 | 42.73 | −1.53% |
| Write-ins | | 42 | 0.00 | N/A |
| Majority | | 276,931 | 14.55 | |
| Total votes | | 1,903,465 | 100.00 | |
| Republican hold | | Swing | | |

== Louisiana ==
Louisiana election
- November 8 and December 10, 2016
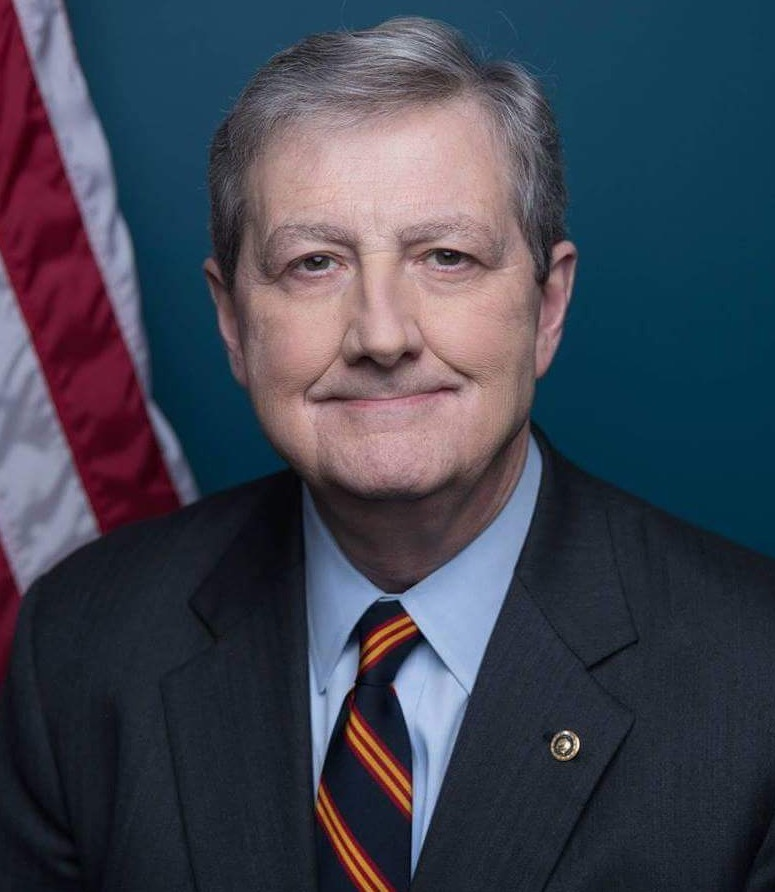

| Nominee | John Kennedy | Foster Campbell |
| Party | Republican | Democratic |
| Popular vote | 536,191 | 347,816 |
| Percentage | 60.7% | 39.3% |
- Kennedy: 50–60% 60–70% 70–80% 80–90% Campbell: 50–60% 80–90%
U.S. senator before election
David Vitter
Republican
Elected U.S. Senator
John Kennedy
Republican

Two-term senator David Vitter (Republican) was re-elected with 57% of the vote in 2010. After losing the 2015 gubernatorial race, Vitter chose to retire from the Senate at the end of his term.

Republicans who ran for the seat included U.S. representatives Charles Boustany and John Fleming, former U.S. representative Joseph Cao, State Treasurer John Kennedy, retired U.S. Air Force Colonel Rob Maness, and former Louisiana state representative David Duke. Other potential Republican candidates included Public Service Commissioner Erik Skrmetta, 2014 candidate for LA-05 Zach Dasher, state representative Paul Hollis, and former president of Jefferson Parish John Young.

Democratic candidates included Public Service Commissioner Foster Campbell, attorney Derrick Edwards, Caroline Fayard, an attorney and candidate for lieutenant governor in 2010, and businessman Josh Pellerin. Other potential Democratic candidates included state legislators Robert Johnson, Eric LaFleur, and Gary Smith Jr., and Mayor of Alexandria Jacques Roy. Former U.S. senator Mary Landrieu and her brother, New Orleans Mayor Mitch Landrieu, declined to run.

As no candidate won a majority of the vote in the "jungle primary", a runoff election was held on December 10 to choose between Kennedy and Campbell (the 2 candidates with the most votes in the primary). John Kennedy was declared the winner of the runoff election with 61% of the vote to Campbell's 39%.

Louisiana general election
| Party | Candidate | Votes | % | ±% |
|---|---|---|---|---|
| Republican | John Kennedy | 536,191 | 60.65 | +4.09% |
| Democratic | Foster Campbell | 347,816 | 39.35 | +1.68% |
| Majority | | 188,375 | 21.30 | |
| Total votes | | 884,007 | 100.00 | |
| Republican hold | | Swing | | |

== Maryland ==
Maryland election
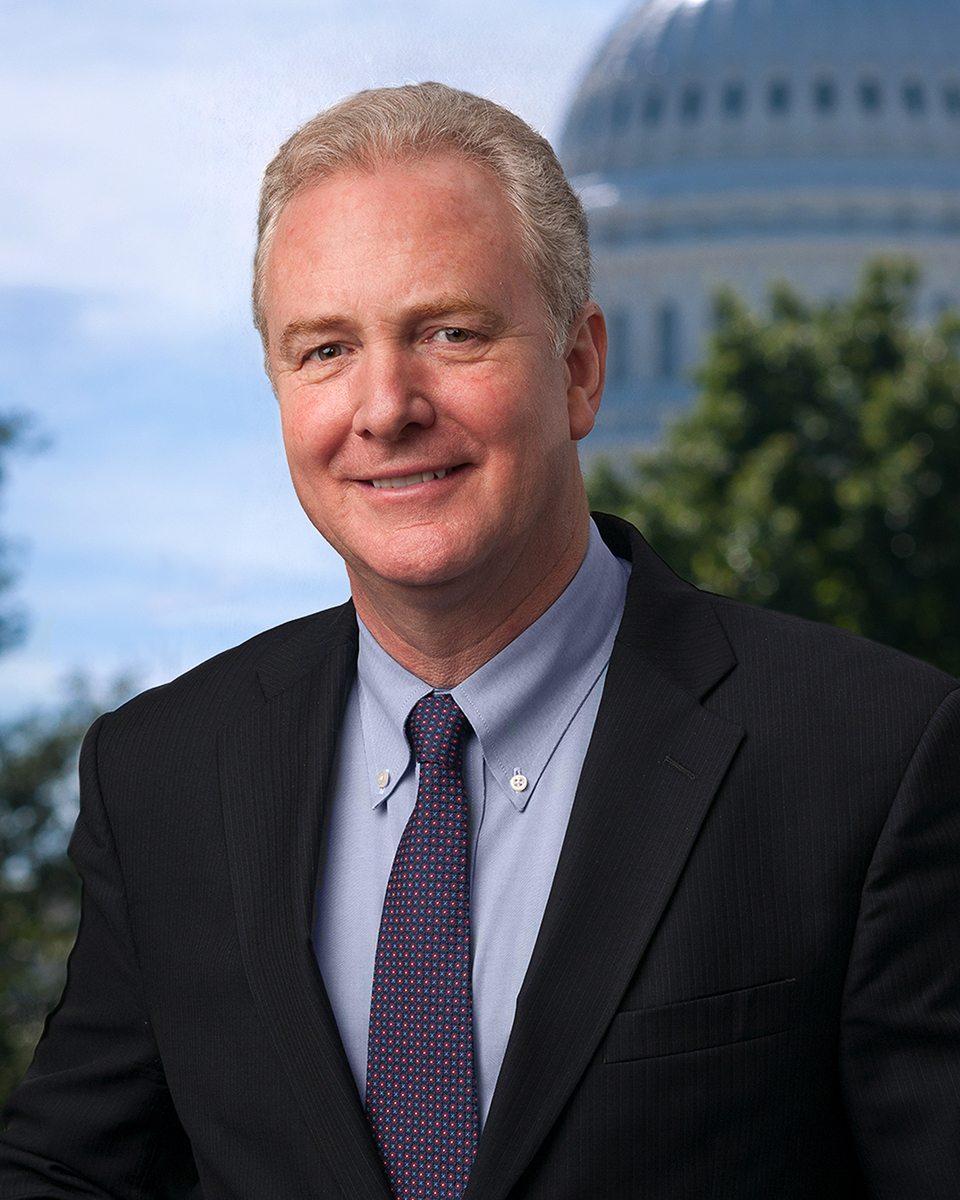

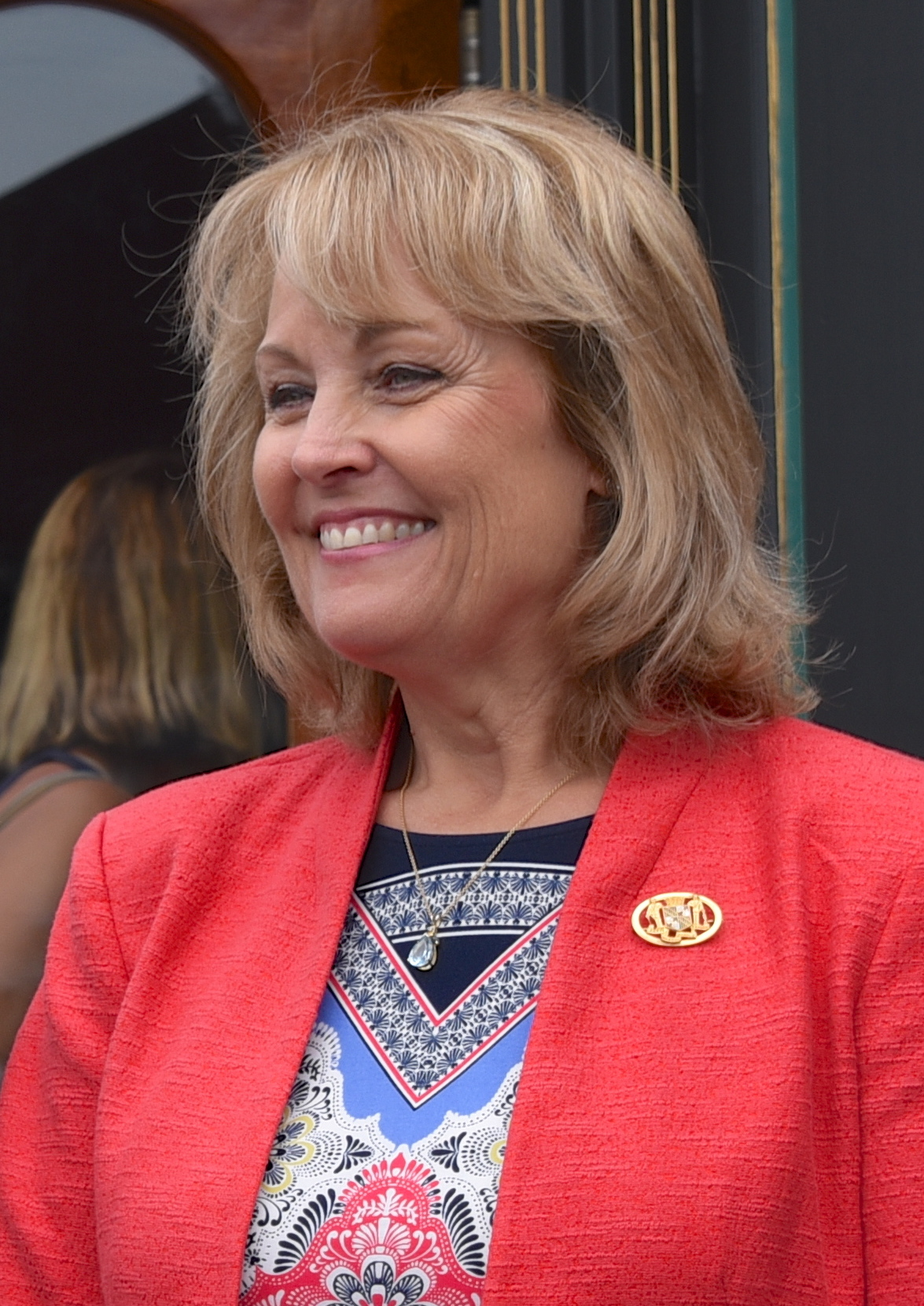
| Nominee | Chris Van Hollen | Kathy Szeliga |
| Party | Democratic | Republican |
| Popular vote | 1,659,907 | 972,557 |
| Percentage | 60.9% | 35.7% |
- Van Hollen: 50–60% 60–70% 70–80% 80–90% Szeliga: 40–50% 50–60% 60–70% 70–80%
U.S. senator before election
Barbara Mikulski
Democratic
Elected U.S. Senator
Chris Van Hollen
Democratic

Five-term U.S. senator Barbara Mikulski of the Democratic Party was re-elected with 62% of the vote in 2010. She is the longest-serving female senator and the longest-serving woman in the history of the U.S. Congress. She did not seek re-election.

The candidates who filed for the Democratic nomination were U.S. representatives Donna Edwards and Chris Van Hollen, Freddie Donald Dickson Jr., Ralph Jaffe, Theresa Scaldaferri, Charles Smith, Violate Staley, Blaine Taylor, Ed Tinus, and Lih Young. Van Hollen won the April 26 primary.

The Republican candidates who filed were former Deputy Assistant Secretary of Defense and Senate candidate in 2012 Richard Douglas, Chrys Kefalas, State Delegate Kathy Szeliga, Chris Chaffee, Sean Connor, John Graziani, Greg Holmes, Joseph David Hooe, Mark McNicholas, Lynn Richardson, Anthony Seda, Richard Shawver, Dave Walle, and Garry T. Yarrington. Szeliga won the primary to face Van Hollen in the general election.

Rep. Van Hollen won election to the Senate with 61% of the vote to Szeliga's 36%.

Maryland Democratic primary election
| Party | Candidate | Votes | % |
|---|---|---|---|
| Democratic | Chris Van Hollen | 470,320 | 53.2 |
| Democratic | Donna Edwards | 343,620 | 38.9 |
| Democratic | Freddie Dickson | 14,856 | 1.7 |
| Democratic | Theresa Scaldaferri | 13,178 | 1.5 |
| Democratic | Violet Staley | 10,244 | 1.2 |
| Democratic | Lih Young | 8,561 | 1.0 |
| Democratic | Charles Smith | 7,912 | 0.9 |
| Democratic | Ralph Jaffe | 7,161 | 0.8 |
| Democratic | Blaine Taylor | 5,932 | 0.7 |
| Democratic | Ed Tinus | 2,560 | 0.3 |
| Total votes | | 884,344 | 100.00 |

Maryland Republican primary election
| Party | Candidate | Votes | % |
|---|---|---|---|
| Republican | Kathy Szeliga | 135,337 | 35.6 |
| Republican | Chris Chaffee | 52,066 | 13.7 |
| Republican | Chrys Kefalas | 36,340 | 9.6 |
| Republican | Richard Douglas | 29,007 | 7.6 |
| Republican | Dave Wallace | 23,226 | 6.1 |
| Republican | Sean Connor | 21,727 | 5.7 |
| Republican | Lynn Richardson | 20,792 | 5.5 |
| Republican | John Graziani | 16,722 | 4.4 |
| Republican | Greg Holmes | 16,148 | 4.3 |
| Republican | Mark McNicholas | 9,988 | 2.6 |
| Republican | Joe Hooe | 8,282 | 2.2 |
| Republican | Anthony Seda | 3,873 | 1.0 |
| Republican | Richard Shawver | 3,155 | 0.8 |
| Republican | Garry Yarrington | 2,988 | 0.8 |
| Total votes | | 379,651 | 100.00 |

Maryland Green primary election
| Party | Candidate | Votes | % |
|---|---|---|---|
| Green | Margaret Flowers | 125 | 98.0 |
| Green | None of the above | 3 | 2.0 |
| Total votes | | 128 | 100.00 |

Maryland general election
| Party | Candidate | Votes | % | ±% |
|---|---|---|---|---|
| Democratic | Chris Van Hollen | 1,659,907 | 60.89 | −1.30% |
| Republican | Kathy Szeliga | 972,557 | 35.67 | −0.08% |
| Green | Margaret Flowers | 89,970 | 3.30 | +2.06% |
| Write-ins | | 3,736 | 0.14 | +0.03% |
| Majority | | 687,350 | 25.21 | |
| Total votes | | 2,726,170 | 100.00 | |
| Democratic hold | | Swing | | |

== Missouri ==
Missouri election
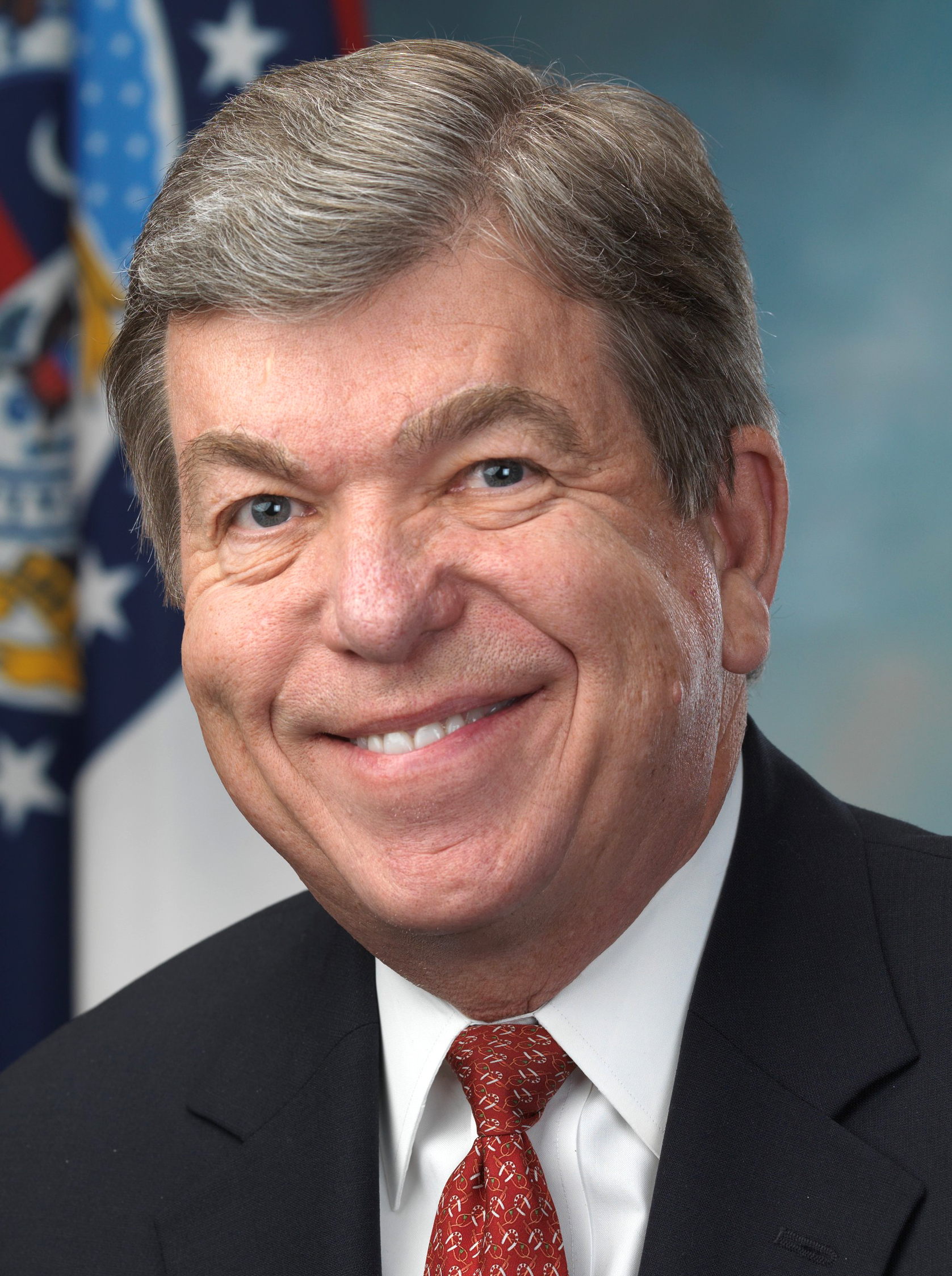

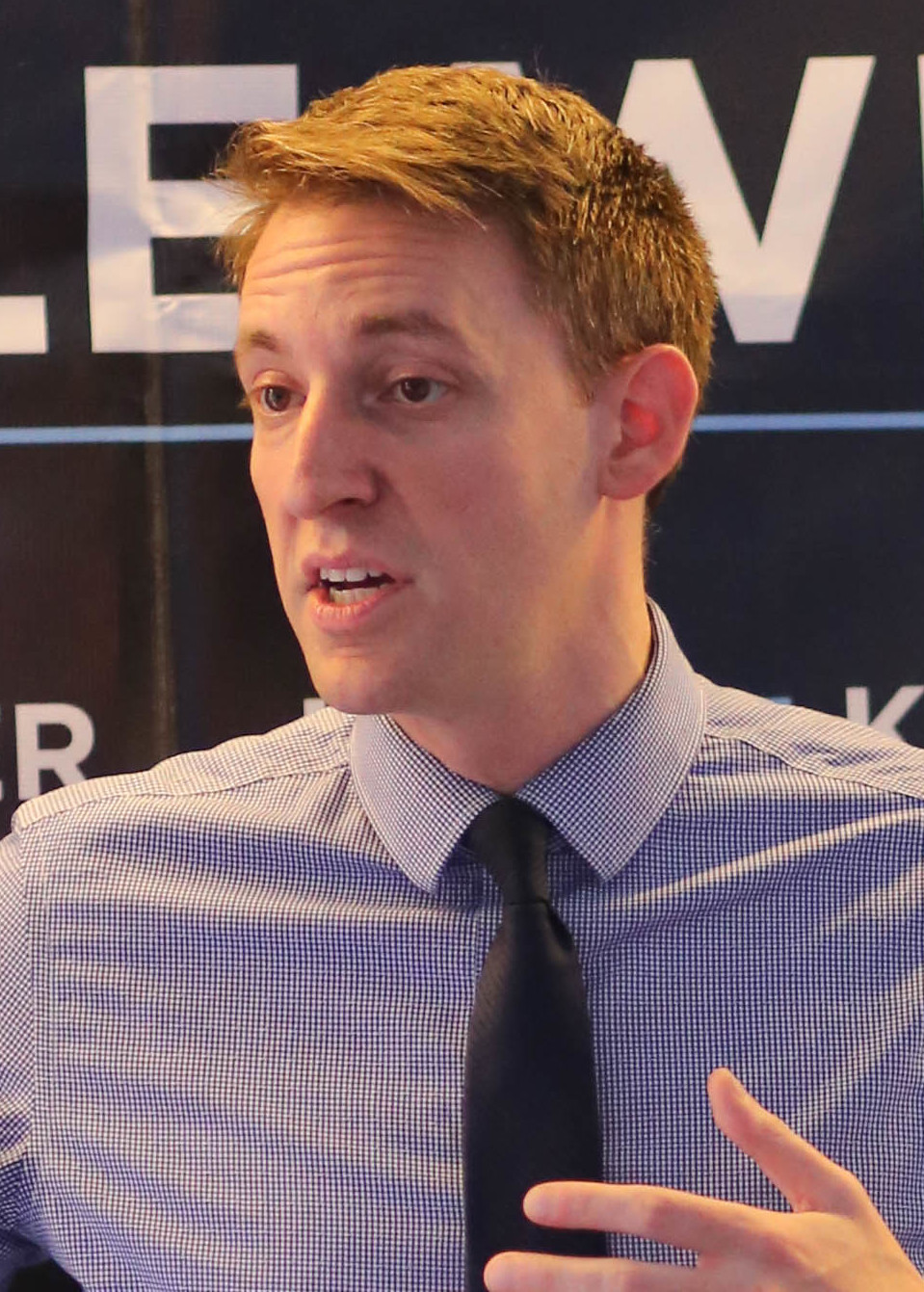
| Nominee | Roy Blunt | Jason Kander |
| Party | Republican | Democratic |
| Popular vote | 1,378,458 | 1,300,200 |
| Percentage | 49.18% | 46.39% |
- Blunt: 40–50% 50–60% 60–70% 70–80% Kander: 40–50% 50–60% 80–90%
U.S. senator before election
Roy Blunt
Republican
Elected U.S. Senator
Roy Blunt
Republican

One-term senator Roy Blunt (Republican) was elected with 54% of the vote in 2010. He was 66 years old in 2016. He ran for re-election. Former U.S. representative and 2012 Senate nominee Todd Akin was rumored to be a possible candidate, but declined to run. Three candidates ran against Blunt for the Republican nomination, the best-known being sales manager, Tea Party activist, and 2010 candidate Kristin Nichols, but Blunt won decisively with 72% of the vote.

For the Democrats, Secretary of State Jason Kander easily won the nomination, defeating Robert Mack, Pastor Cori Bush, and activist Chief Wana Dubie. Governor Jay Nixon and State Treasurer Clint Zweifel chose not to seek election to the Senate.

Sen. Blunt won re-election with 49% of the vote to Kander's 46%.

Missouri Republican primary election
| Party | Candidate | Votes | % |
|---|---|---|---|
| Republican | Roy Blunt (incumbent) | 481,444 | 72.55 |
| Republican | Kristi Nichols | 134,025 | 20.20 |
| Republican | Ryan Luethy | 29,328 | 4.42 |
| Republican | Bernie Mowinski | 18,789 | 2.83 |
| Total votes | | 663,586 | 100.00 |

Missouri Democratic primary election
| Party | Candidate | Votes | % |
|---|---|---|---|
| Democratic | Jason Kander | 223,492 | 69.87 |
| Democratic | Cori Bush | 42,453 | 13.27 |
| Democratic | Chief Wana Dubie | 30,432 | 9.51 |
| Democratic | Robert Mack | 23,509 | 7.35 |
| Total votes | | 319,886 | 100.00 |

Missouri Libertarian primary election
| Party | Candidate | Votes | % |
|---|---|---|---|
| Libertarian | Jonathan Dine | 2,002 | 54.90 |
| Libertarian | Herschel Young | 1,642 | 45.06 |
| Total votes | | 3,644 | 100.00 |

Missouri Constitution primary election
| Party | Candidate | Votes | % |
|---|---|---|---|
| Constitution | Fred Ryman | 545 | 100.00 |
| Total votes | | 545 | 100.00 |

Missouri general election
| Party | Candidate | Votes | % | ±% |
|---|---|---|---|---|
| Republican | Roy Blunt (incumbent) | 1,378,458 | 49.18 | −5.05% |
| Democratic | Jason Kander | 1,300,200 | 46.39 | +5.76% |
| Libertarian | Jonathan Dine | 67,738 | 2.42 | −0.60% |
| Green | Johnathan McFarland | 30,743 | 1.10 | N/A |
| Constitution | Fred Ryman | 25,407 | 0.91 | −1.22% |
| | Write-ins | 95 | 0.03 | N/A |
| Plurality | | 78,258 | 2.79 | |
| Total votes | | 2,802,641 | 100.00 | |
| Republican hold | | | | |

== Nevada ==
Nevada election
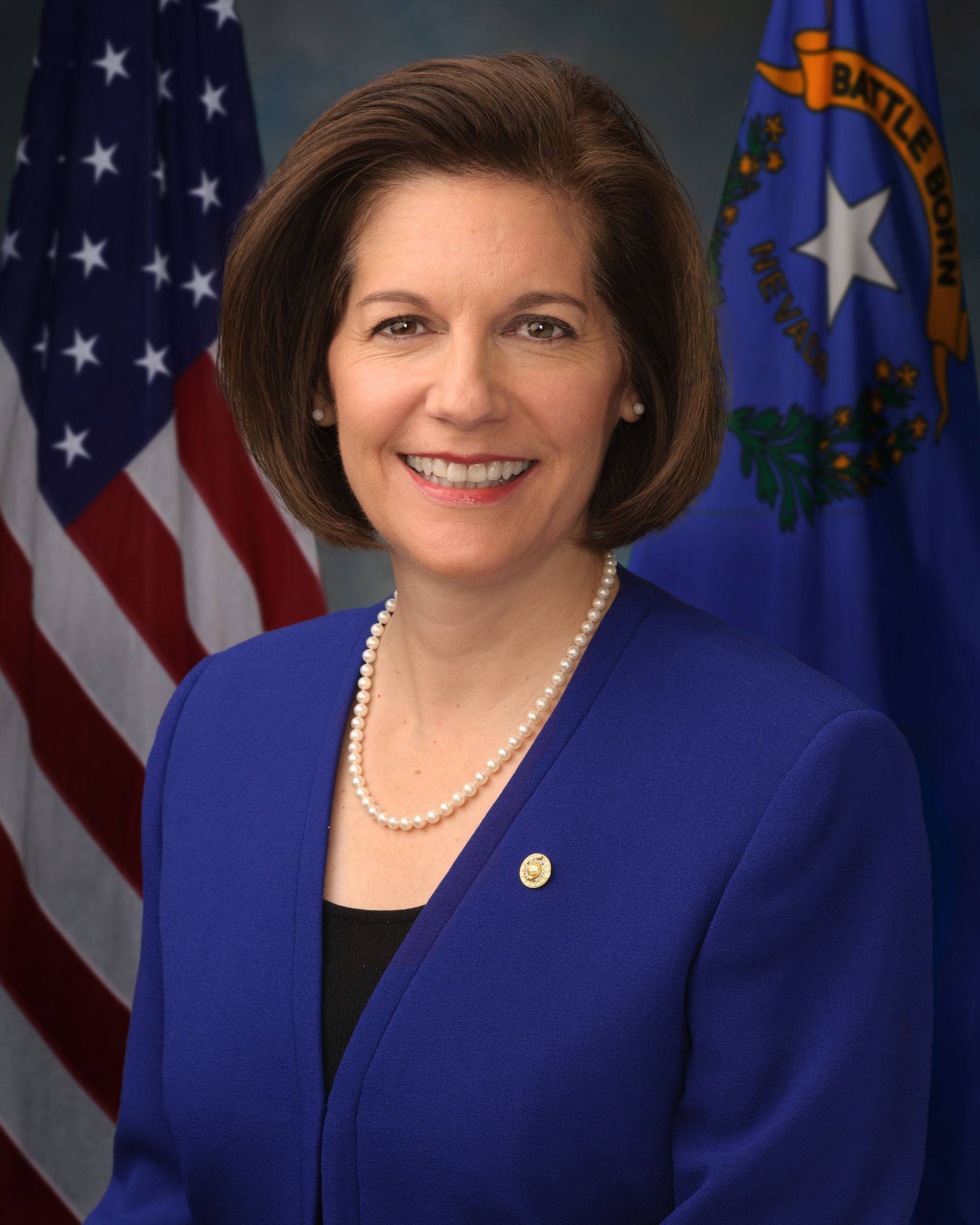

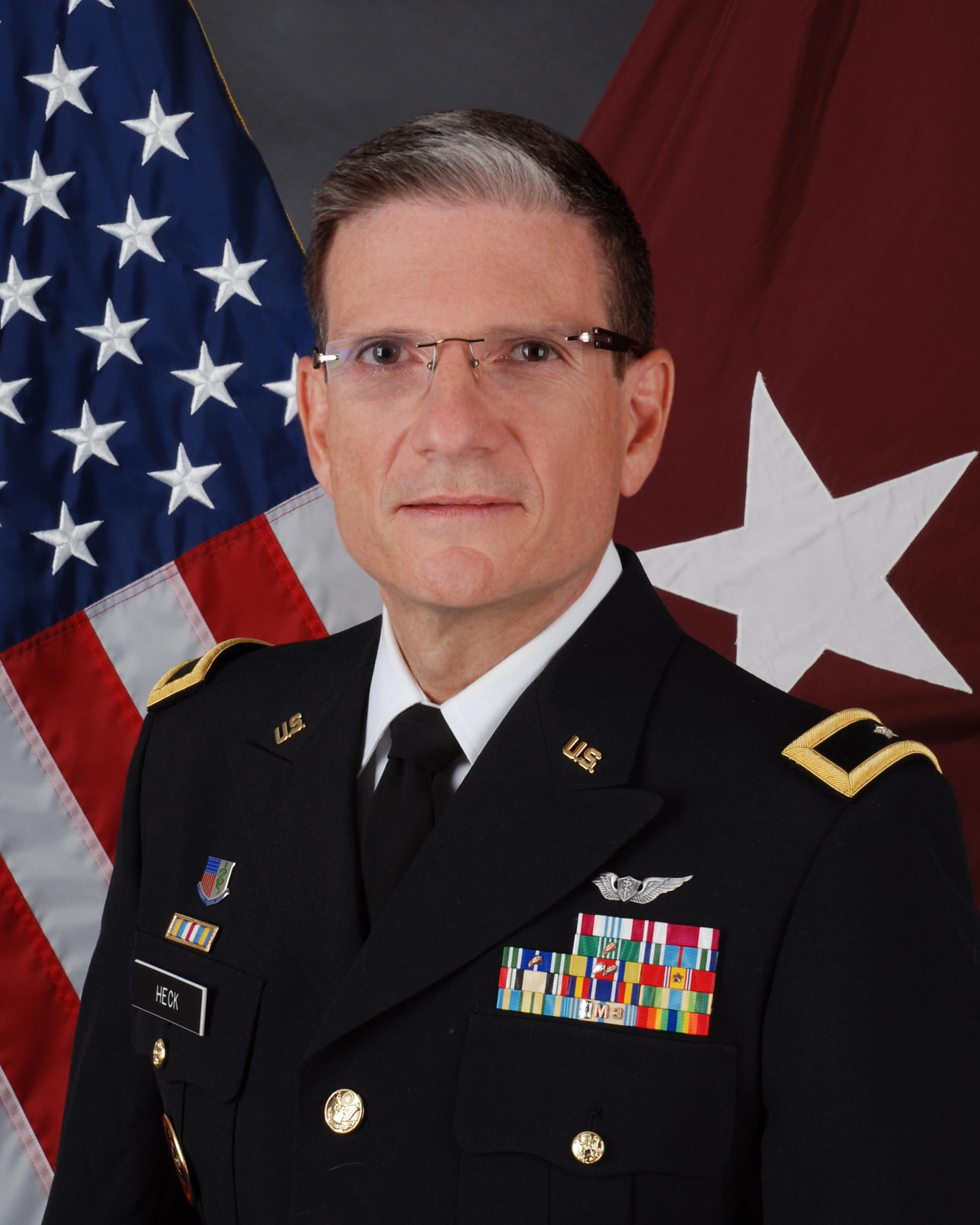
| Nominee | Catherine Cortez Masto | Joe Heck |
| Party | Democratic | Republican |
| Popular vote | 521,994 | 495,079 |
| Percentage | 47.1% | 44.7% |
- Cortez Masto: 50–60% Heck: 40–50% 50–60% 60–70% 70–80% 80–90%
U.S. senator before election
Harry Reid
Democratic
Elected U.S. Senator
Catherine Cortez Masto
Democratic

Five-term senator and Senate Minority Leader Harry Reid (Democrat) was re-elected with 50% of the vote in 2010. Reid did not seek re-election. Former Nevada Attorney General Catherine Cortez Masto earned the Democratic nomination, defeating Bobby Mahendra, Liddo Susan O'Briant, and Allen Rheinhart in the primary on June 14, 2016.

Congressman Joe Heck defeated eight candidates, including 2010 nominee Sharron Angle, who ran against Reid in 2010, for the Republican nomination.

Jarrod M. Williams, an independent candidate ran for the seat. He describes himself as a Democratic Socialist, a supporter of Bernie Sanders, and a member of the Socialist Party USA, although the party does not have a chapter in the State of Nevada. Cortez Masto was elected with 47.1% of the vote to Heck's 44.7%.

Democratic primary
| Party | Candidate | Votes | % |
|---|---|---|---|
| Democratic | Catherine Cortez Masto | 81,944 | 81.0 |
| Democratic | Allen Rheinhart | 5,645 | 6.0 |
| Democratic | None of these candidates | 5,498 | 5.0 |
| Democratic | Liddo Susan O'Briant | 4,834 | 5.0 |
| Democratic | Bobby Mahendra | 3,760 | 3.0 |
| Total votes | | 101,681 | 100.0 |

Republican primary
| Party | Candidate | Votes | % |
|---|---|---|---|
| Republican | Joe Heck | 74,517 | 65.0 |
| Republican | Sharron Angle | 26,142 | 23.0 |
| Republican | None of these candidates | 3,902 | 3.0 |
| Republican | Thomas Heck | 3,570 | 3.0 |
| Republican | Eddie Hamilton | 2,507 | 2.0 |
| Republican | D'Nese Davis | 1,937 | 1.8 |
| Republican | Bill Tarbell | 1,179 | 1.0 |
| Republican | Robert Leeds | 662 | 0.6 |
| Republican | Juston Preble | 582 | 0.5 |
| Republican | Carlo Poliak | 279 | 0.2 |
| Total votes | | 114,827 | 100.0 |

Nevada general election
| Party | Candidate | Votes | % | ±% |
|---|---|---|---|---|
| Democratic | Catherine Cortez Masto | 521,994 | 47.10 | −3.19% |
| Republican | Joe Heck | 495,079 | 44.67 | +0.12% |
| None of These Candidates | – | 42,257 | 3.81 | +1.56% |
| Independent American Party (Nevada) | Tom Jones | 17,128 | 1.55 | +1.11% |
| Independent | Tony Guinta | 10,740 | 0.97 | N/A |
| Independent | Jarrod Williams | 6,888 | 0.62 | N/A |
| Plurality | | 26,231 | 2.37 | |
| Total votes | | 1,108,294 | 100.00 | +53.64% |
| Democratic hold | | Swing | Democratic hold | |

== New Hampshire ==
New Hampshire election
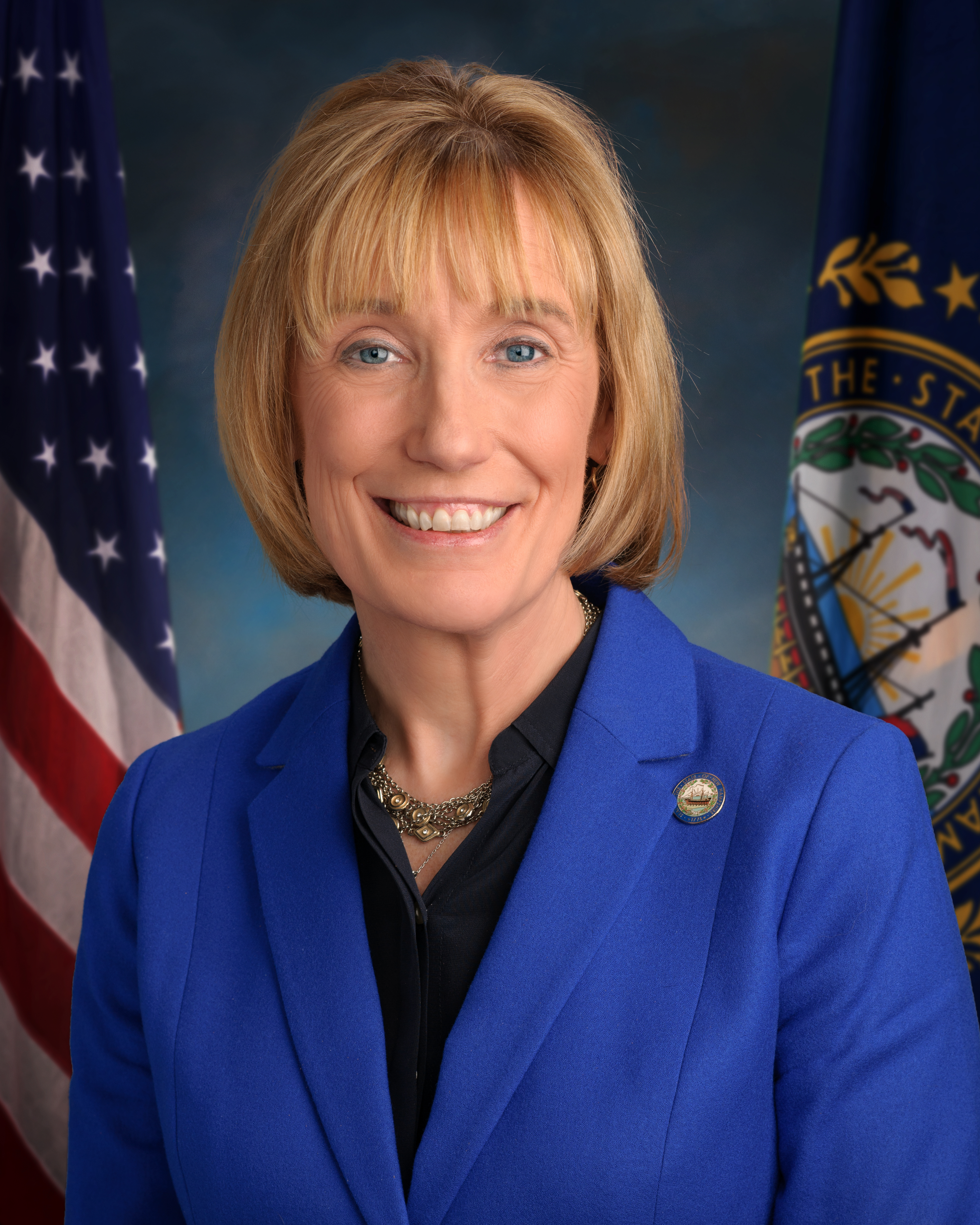

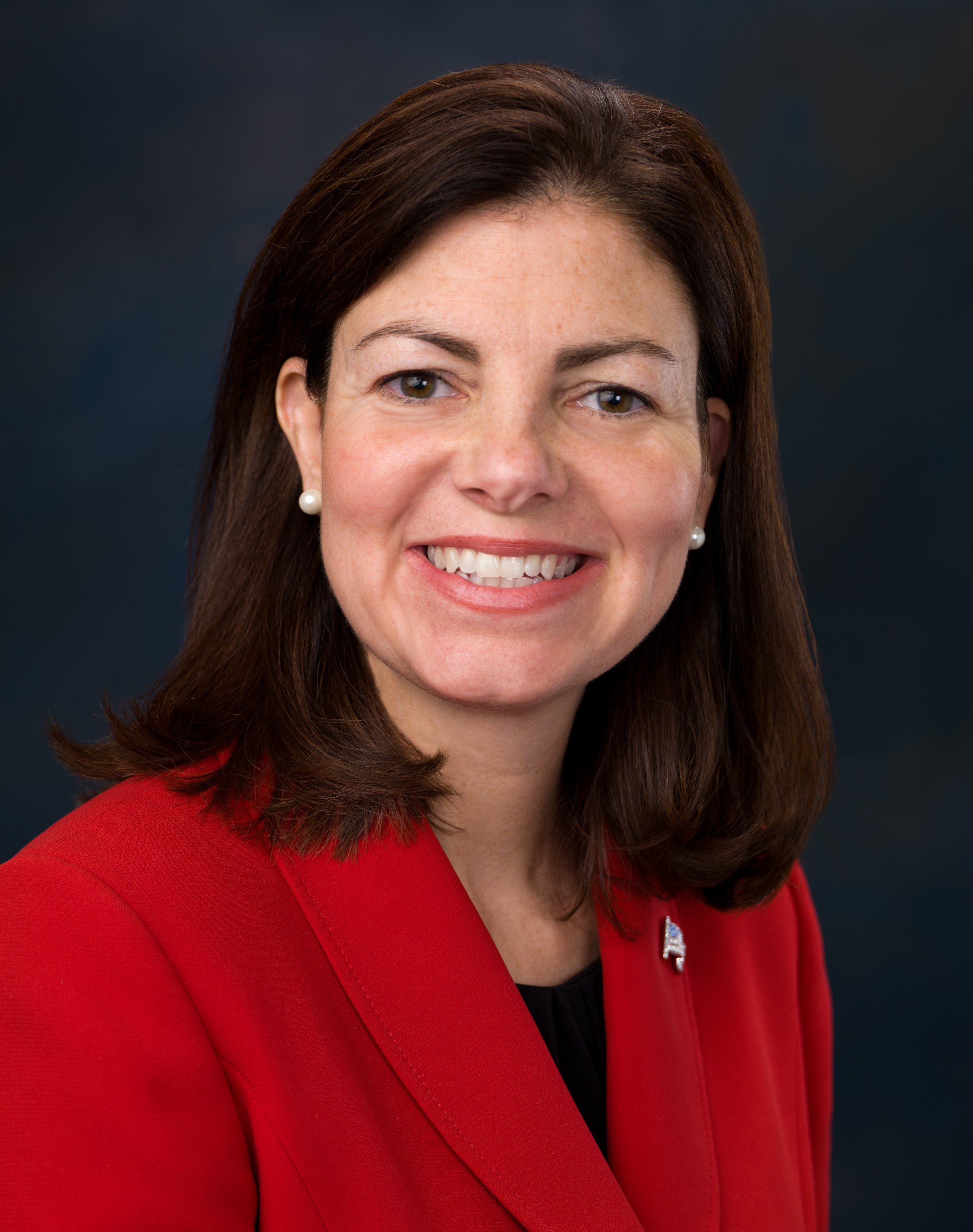
| Nominee | Maggie Hassan | Kelly Ayotte |
| Party | Democratic | Republican |
| Popular vote | 354,649 | 353,632 |
| Percentage | 48.0% | 47.8% |
- Hassan: 40–50% 50–60% 60–70% 70–80% >90% Ayotte: 40–50% 50–60% 60–70% 70–80% Tie: 50–60% No votes
U.S. senator before election
Kelly Ayotte
Republican
Elected U.S. Senator
Maggie Hassan
Democratic

One-term senator Kelly Ayotte (Republican) was elected with 60% of the vote in 2010. She was 48 years old in 2016. Ayotte ran for re-election. Jim Rubens, a former state senator, candidate for governor in 1998 and for the Senate in 2014, announced a challenge to Ayotte in the primary, but Ayotte won the nomination.

Brian Chabot was the Libertarian candidate for US Senate in 2016. He was a relative newcomer to politics, having run for US Senate in 2010 and US representative in 2014.

Governor Maggie Hassan ran for the Democratic nomination. Other potential candidates included Executive Councilor Chris Pappas, state senators Dan Feltes and Donna Soucy, Portsmouth city councilor and daughter of U.S. senator Jeanne Shaheen Stefany Shaheen, and campaign manager for Senator Shaheen Mike Vlacich.

A series of polls taken by WMUR/UNH in February, April, and July 2016, as well as WBUR polls taken in May and July/August, showed Hassan gaining support over time and subsequently leading Ayotte.

Gov. Hassan won a very close election, 353,978 or 47.97%, to Sen. Ayotte's 353,262 or 47.87%, a difference of 716 votes. Sen. Ayotte conceded the race to Gov. Hassan around noon on Wednesday, November 9, 2016.

New Hampshire Republican primary election
| Party | Candidate | Votes | % |
|---|---|---|---|
| Republican | Kelly Ayotte (incumbent) | 86,558 | 78.55 |
| Republican | Jim Rubens | 19,139 | 17.37 |
| Republican | Tom Alciere | 1,586 | 1.44 |
| Republican | Gerald Beloin | 1,252 | 1.14 |
| Republican | Stanley Emanuel | 1,187 | 1.08 |
| Democratic | Maggie Hassan (write-in) | 301 | 0.27 |
| | Scatter | 167 | 0.15 |
| Total votes | | 110,190 | 100.00 |

New Hampshire general election
| Party | Candidate | Votes | % | ±% |
|---|---|---|---|---|
| Democratic | Maggie Hassan | 354,649 | 47.98 | +11.28% |
| Republican | Kelly Ayotte (incumbent) | 353,632 | 47.84 | −12.28% |
| Independent | Aaron Day | 17,742 | 2.40 | N/A |
| Libertarian | Brian Chabot | 12,597 | 1.70 | +0.65% |
| Plurality | | 1,017 | 0.14 | |
| Turnout | | 738,620 | 100.00 | |
| Democratic gain from Republican | | Swing | | |

== New York ==
New York election
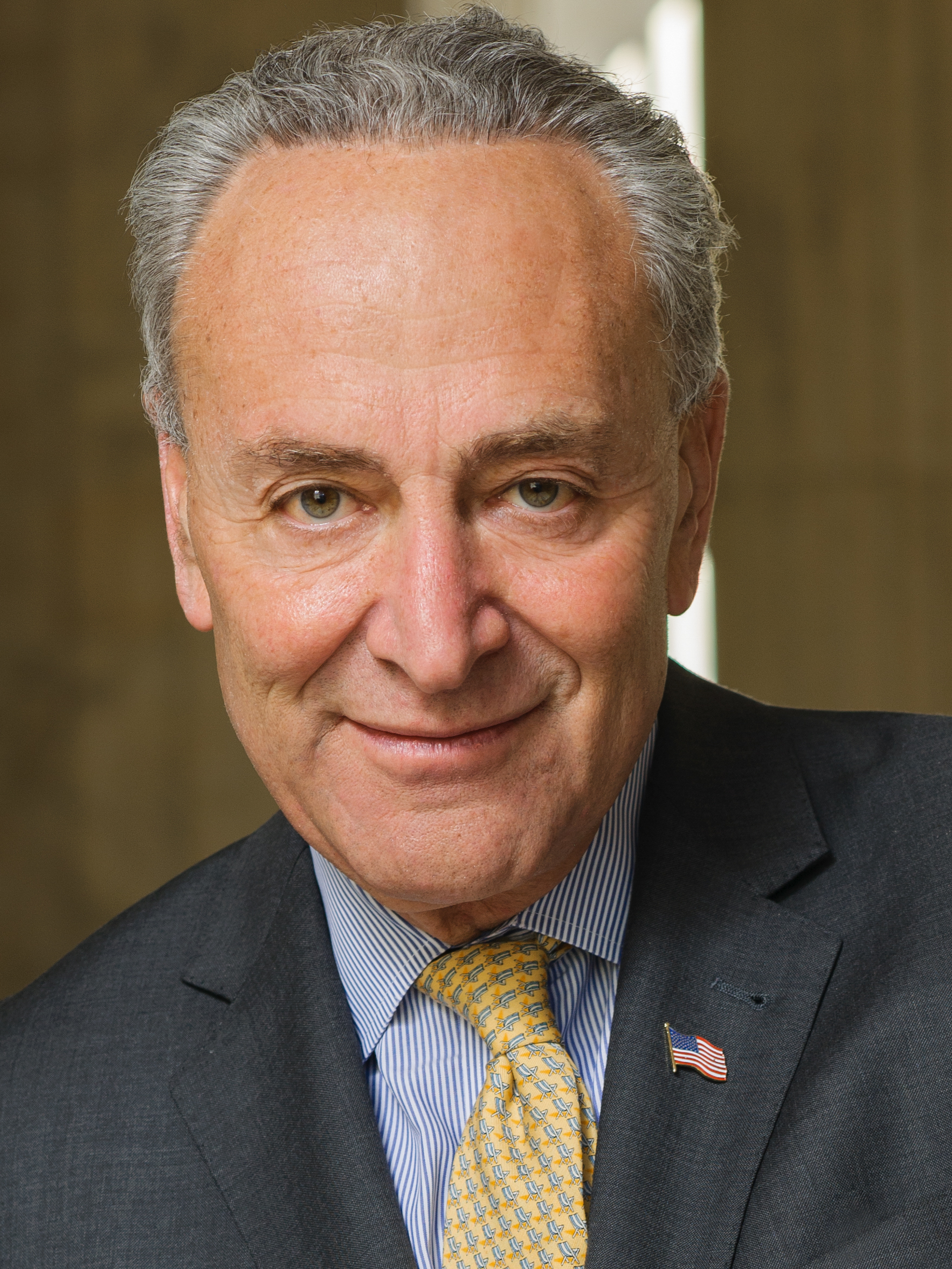

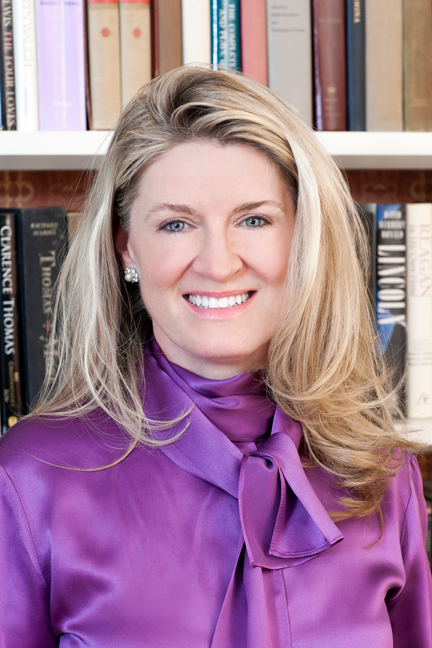
| Nominee | Chuck Schumer | Wendy Long |
| Party | Democratic | Republican |
| Popular vote | 5,221,945 | 2,009,355 |
| Percentage | 70.6% | 27.2% |
- Schumer: 40-50% 50-60% 60-70% 70-80% 80-90% >90% Long: 50-60%
U.S. senator before election
Chuck Schumer
Democratic
Elected U.S. Senator
Chuck Schumer
Democratic

Three-term senator Chuck Schumer (Democrat) was re-elected with 66% of the vote in 2010. He was 66 years old in 2016. He ran for re-election. Schumer had been elected leader of the Senate Democrats on November 16, 2016, succeeding Harry Reid.

Wendy Long, the Republican nominee in 2012, ran as the nominee of Republican, Conservative, and Reform Parties. Other potential Republican candidates included U.S. representatives Chris Gibson and Peter T. King. U.S. representative Richard L. Hanna, Manhattan Republican Party Chairwoman Adele Malpass, and former CNBC television host Larry Kudlow were also mentioned as possible candidates, but all declined to run.

Robin Laverne Wilson, the Green Party of New York nominee, received 1.5% of the vote. Alex Merced, the Libertarian Party candidate, received 0.7% of the vote.

New York general election
| Party | Candidate | Votes | % | ±% |
|---|---|---|---|---|
| Democratic | Chuck Schumer | 4,784,218 | 61.34 | N/A |
| Working Families | Chuck Schumer | 241,672 | 3.10 | N/A |
| Independence | Chuck Schumer | 150,654 | 1.93 | N/A |
| Women's Equality | Chuck Schumer | 45,401 | 0.58 | N/A |
| Total | Chuck Schumer (incumbent) | 5,221,945 | 70.64% | +2.97% |
| Republican | Wendy Long | 1,723,920 | 22.10 | N/A |
| Conservative | Wendy Long | 267,622 | 3.43 | N/A |
| Reform | Wendy Long | 17,813 | 0.23 | N/A |
| Total | Wendy Long | 2,009,335 | 27.18 | −0.58% |
| Green | Robin Laverne Wilson | 113,413 | 1.45 | +0.45% |
| Libertarian | Alex Merced | 48,120 | 0.62 | +0.02% |
| None | Blank/void/scattering | 407,786 | 5.22 | N/A |
| Total votes | | 7,800,619 | 100.00 | |
| Democratic hold | | Swing | | |

== North Carolina ==
North Carolina election
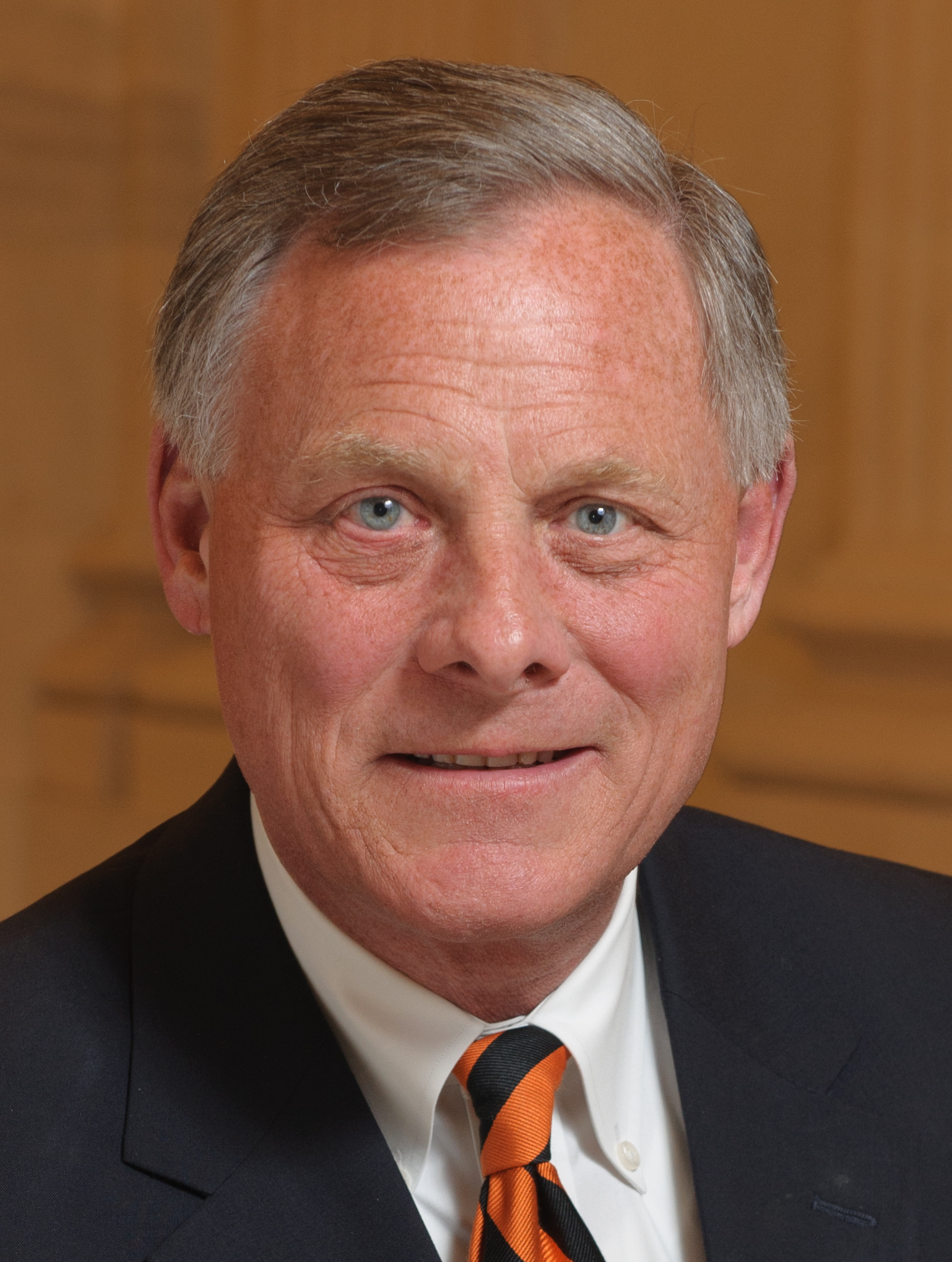

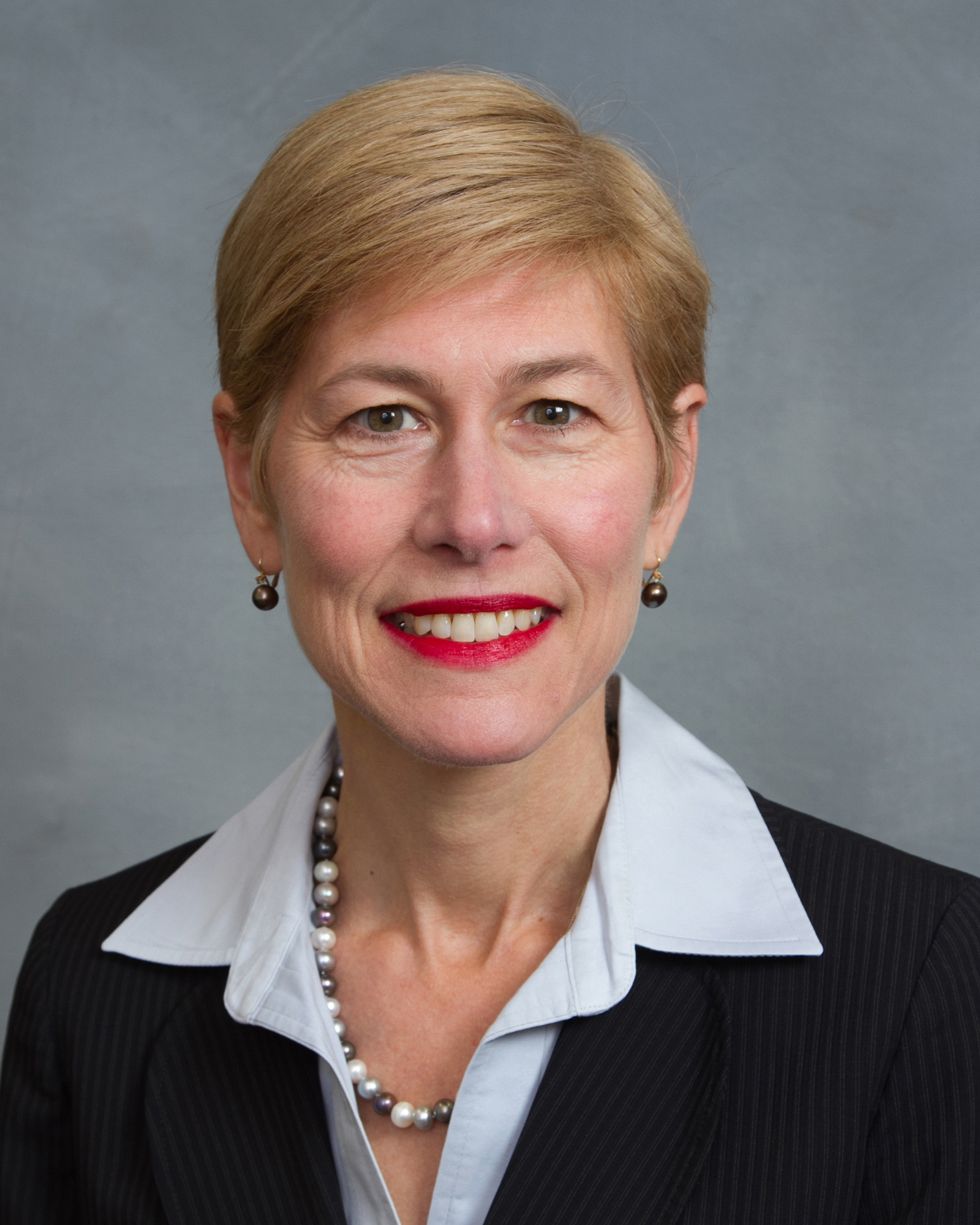
| Nominee | Richard Burr | Deborah K. Ross |
| Party | Republican | Democratic |
| Popular vote | 2,395,376 | 2,128,165 |
| Percentage | 51.1% | 45.4% |
- Burr: 40–50% 50–60% 60–70% 70–80% Ross: 50–60% 60–70% 70–80%
U.S. senator before election
Richard Burr
Republican
Elected U.S. Senator
Richard Burr
Republican

Two-term senator Richard Burr (Republican) was re-elected with 55% of the vote in 2010. He was 61 years old in 2016. There had been speculation that Burr might retire, but he ran for re-election.

Three Republicans challenged Burr in the primary: Greg Brannon, Larry Holmquist, and former Superior Court judge Paul Wright. On March 15, Burr won the primary with 61% of the vote.

Former state representative Deborah Ross, Spring Lake Mayor Chris Rey, businessman Kevin Griffin, and retired U.S. Army Captain Ernest Reeves ran for the Democratic nomination. Former U.S. senator Kay Hagan, state treasurer Janet Cowell, and Anthony Foxx, the United States Secretary of Transportation and former mayor of Charlotte, declined to run. On March 15, Ross won the primary with 62% of the vote.

Burr won re-election 51% to 45% for Ross.

North Carolina Republican primary election
| Party | Candidate | Votes | % |
|---|---|---|---|
| Republican | Richard Burr (incumbent) | 622,074 | 61.41 |
| Republican | Greg Brannon | 255,030 | 25.17 |
| Republican | Paul Wright | 85,944 | 8.48 |
| Republican | Larry Holmquist | 50,010 | 4.94 |
| Total votes | | 1,013,058 | 100.00 |

North Carolina Democratic primary election
| Party | Candidate | Votes | % |
|---|---|---|---|
| Democratic | Deborah Ross | 614,414 | 62.32 |
| Democratic | Chris Rey | 162,869 | 16.52 |
| Democratic | Kevin Griffin | 115,618 | 11.73 |
| Democratic | Ernest Reeves | 93,005 | 9.43 |
| Total votes | | 985,906 | 100.00 |

North Carolina general election
| Party | Candidate | Votes | % | ±% |
|---|---|---|---|---|
| Republican | Richard Burr (incumbent) | 2,395,376 | 51.06 | −3.75% |
| Democratic | Deborah Ross | 2,128,165 | 45.37 | +2.32% |
| Libertarian | Sean Haugh | 167,592 | 3.57 | +1.48% |
| Majority | | 267,208 | 5.69 | ▼6.07% |
| Total votes | | 4,691,133 | 100.00 | +76.35% |
| Republican hold | | Swing | | |

== North Dakota ==
North Dakota election
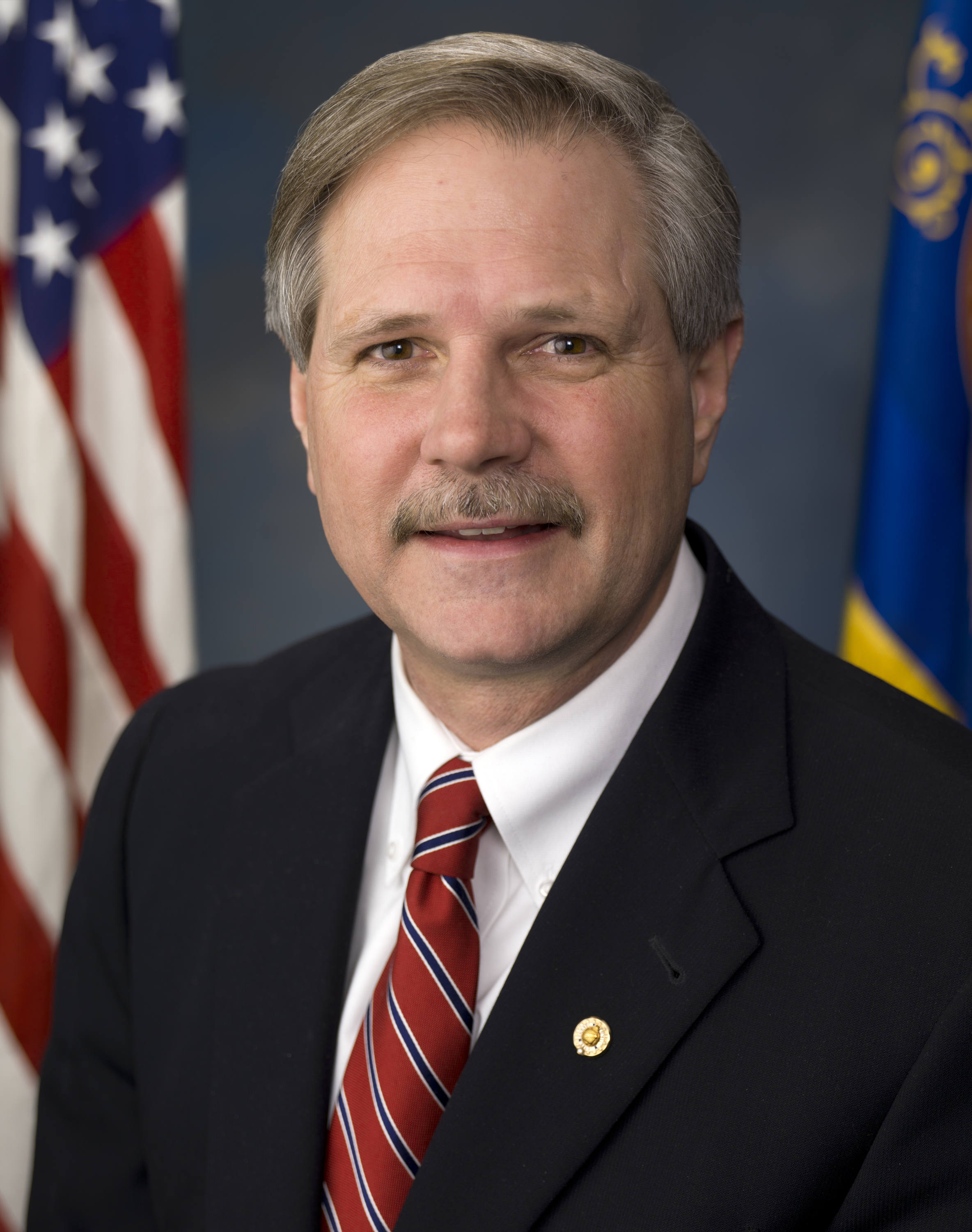

| Nominee | John Hoeven | Eliot Glassheim |
| Party | Republican | Democratic–NPL |
| Popular vote | 268,788 | 58,116 |
| Percentage | 78.5% | 17.0% |
- Hoeven: 40–50% 60–70% 70–80% 80–90% >90% Glassheim: 50–60%
U.S. senator before election
John Hoeven
Republican
Elected U.S. Senator
John Hoeven
Republican

One-term senator John Hoeven (Republican) was elected with 76% of the vote in 2010. He was 59 years old in 2016. He ran for re-election.

Democrats endorsed state representative Eliot Glassheim. On November 7, 2015, the Libertarian party nominated Robert Marquette.

Hoeven defeated Glassheim 78% to 17%.

North Dakota Republican primary election
| Party | Candidate | Votes | % |
|---|---|---|---|
| Republican | John Hoeven (incumbent) | 103,677 | 99.57 |
| Republican | Write-in | 445 | 0.43 |
| Total votes | | 104,122 | 100.00 |

Democratic-NPL primary election
| Party | Candidate | Votes | % |
|---|---|---|---|
| Democratic–NPL | Eliot Glassheim | 17,243 | 99.72 |
| Democratic–NPL | Write-in | 48 | 0.28 |
| Total votes | | 17,291 | 100.00 |

Libertarian primary election
| Party | Candidate | Votes | % |
|---|---|---|---|
| Libertarian | Robert Marquette | 1,089 | 99.54 |
| Libertarian | Write-in | 5 | 0.46 |
| Total votes | | 1,094 | 100.00 |

North Dakota general election
| Party | Candidate | Votes | % | ±% |
|---|---|---|---|---|
| Republican | John Hoeven (incumbent) | 268,788 | 78.48 | +2.40% |
| Democratic–NPL | Eliot Glassheim | 58,116 | 16.97 | −5.20% |
| Libertarian | Robert Marquette | 10,556 | 3.08 | +1.45% |
| Independent | James Germalic | 4,675 | 1.36 | N/A |
| Write-ins | | 366 | 0.11 | N/A |
| Majority | | 210,672 | 61.51 | |
| Turnout | | 342,501 | 100.00 | |
| Republican hold | | Swing | | |

== Ohio ==
Ohio election
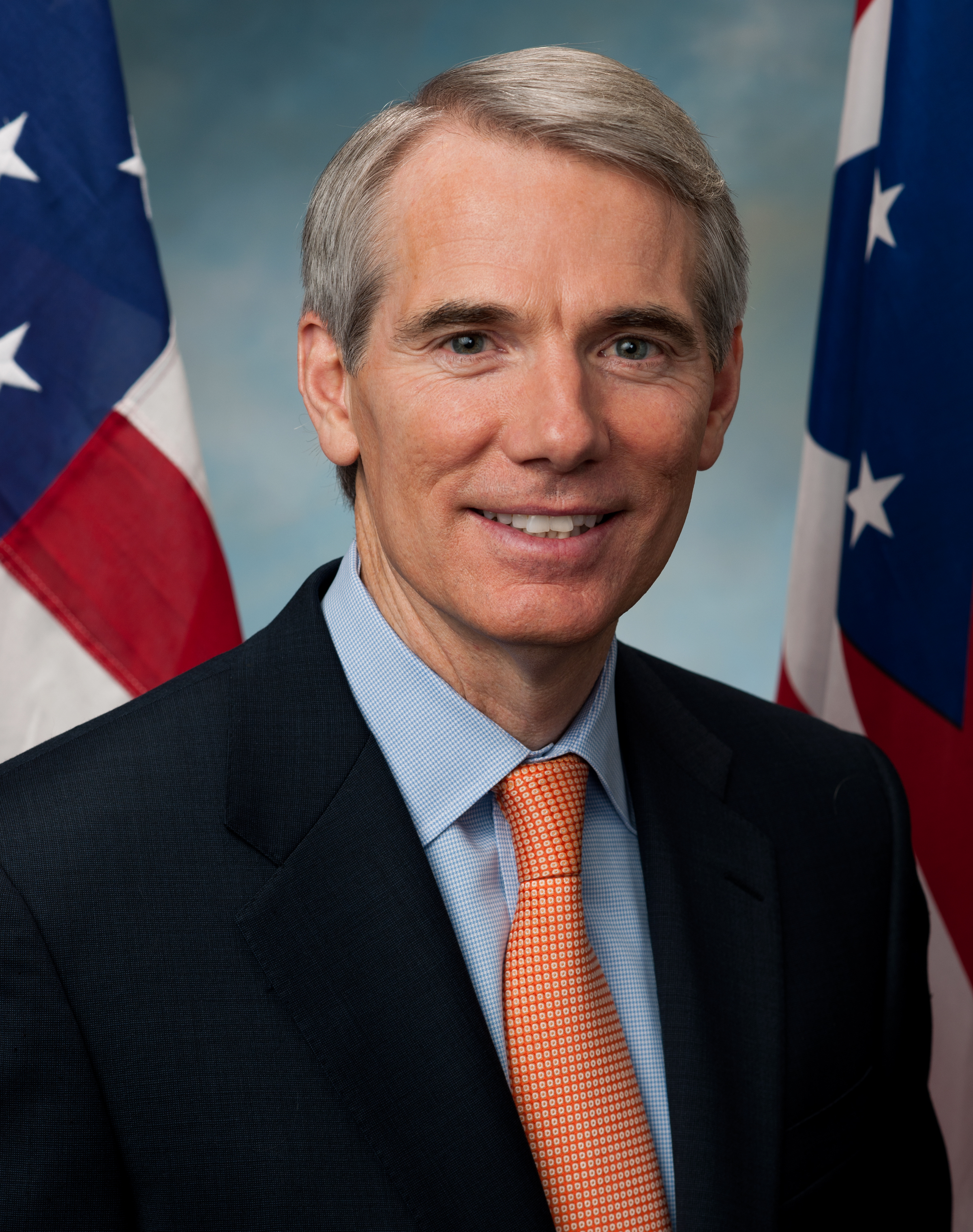

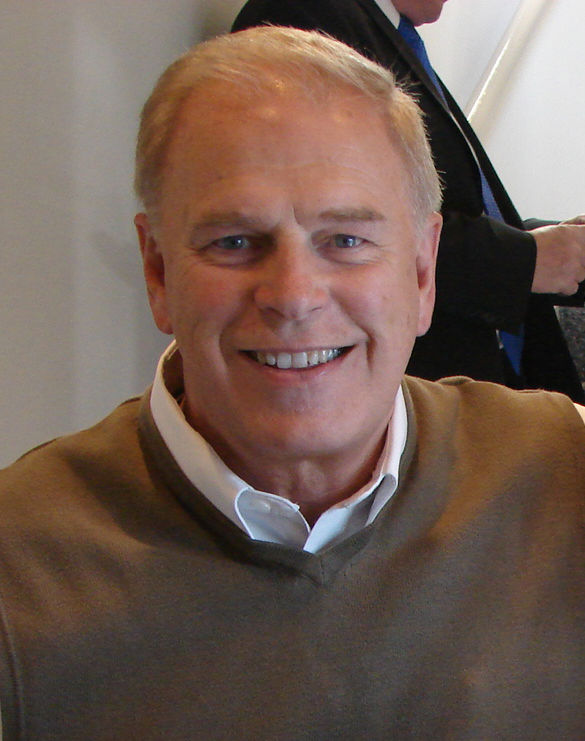
| Nominee | Rob Portman | Ted Strickland |
| Party | Republican | Democratic |
| Popular vote | 3,118,567 | 1,996,908 |
| Percentage | 58.0% | 37.2% |
- Portman: 40–50% 50–60% 60–70% 70–80% 80–90% Strickland: 40–50% 50–60%
U.S. senator before election
Rob Portman
Republican
Elected U.S. Senator
Rob Portman
Republican

One-term senator Rob Portman (Republican) was elected with 57% of the vote in 2010. He was 60 years old in 2016. He ran for re-election. He had considered running for president, but decided not to.

Two candidates filed to challenge him: Don Elijah Eckhart, who ran for OH-15 as an independent in 2008, and Melissa Strzala. However, Strzala was disqualified. On March 15, Portman won the primary with 82% of the vote.

Former governor and Congressman Ted Strickland, Cincinnati City Councilman P.G. Sittenfeld, and occupational therapist Kelli Prather ran for the Democratic nomination. Former state representative Bob Hagan had filed papers to run, but later withdrew from the race. On March 15, Strickland won the primary with 65% of the vote.

Joseph DeMare, a machinist from Bowling Green, was the Green Party candidate. He ran unopposed in the March 15, 2016 primary, and received enough votes to substantially increase the number of enrolled Green Party members. In Ohio, the only way to join a political party is to vote in that party's primary.

Portman defeated Strickland 58% to 37.2%.

Ohio Republican primary election
| Party | Candidate | Votes | % |
|---|---|---|---|
| Republican | Rob Portman (incumbent) | 1,336,686 | 82.16 |
| Republican | Don Elijah Eckhart | 290,268 | 17.84 |
| Total votes | | 1,626,954 | 100.00 |

Ohio Democratic primary election
| Party | Candidate | Votes | % |
|---|---|---|---|
| Democratic | Ted Strickland | 742,676 | 65.04 |
| Democratic | P.G. Sittenfeld | 254,232 | 22.26 |
| Democratic | Kelli Prather | 144,945 | 12.69 |
| Total votes | | 1,141,853 | 100.00 |

Green primary election
| Party | Candidate | Votes | % |
|---|---|---|---|
| Green | Joe DeMare | 3,123 | 100.00 |
| Total votes | | 3,123 | 100.00 |

Ohio general election
| Party | Candidate | Votes | % | ±% |
|---|---|---|---|---|
| Republican | Rob Portman (incumbent) | 3,118,567 | 58.03 | +1.18% |
| Democratic | Ted Strickland | 1,996,908 | 37.16 | −2.24% |
| Independent | Tom Connors | 93,041 | 1.73 | N/A |
| Green | Joseph R. DeMare | 88,246 | 1.64 | N/A |
| Independent | Scott Rupert | 77,291 | 1.44 | N/A |
| Independent | James Stahl (Write-in) | 111 | 0.00 | N/A |
| Total votes | | 5,374,164 | 100.00 | |
| Republican hold | | Swing | NA | |

== Oklahoma ==
Oklahoma election
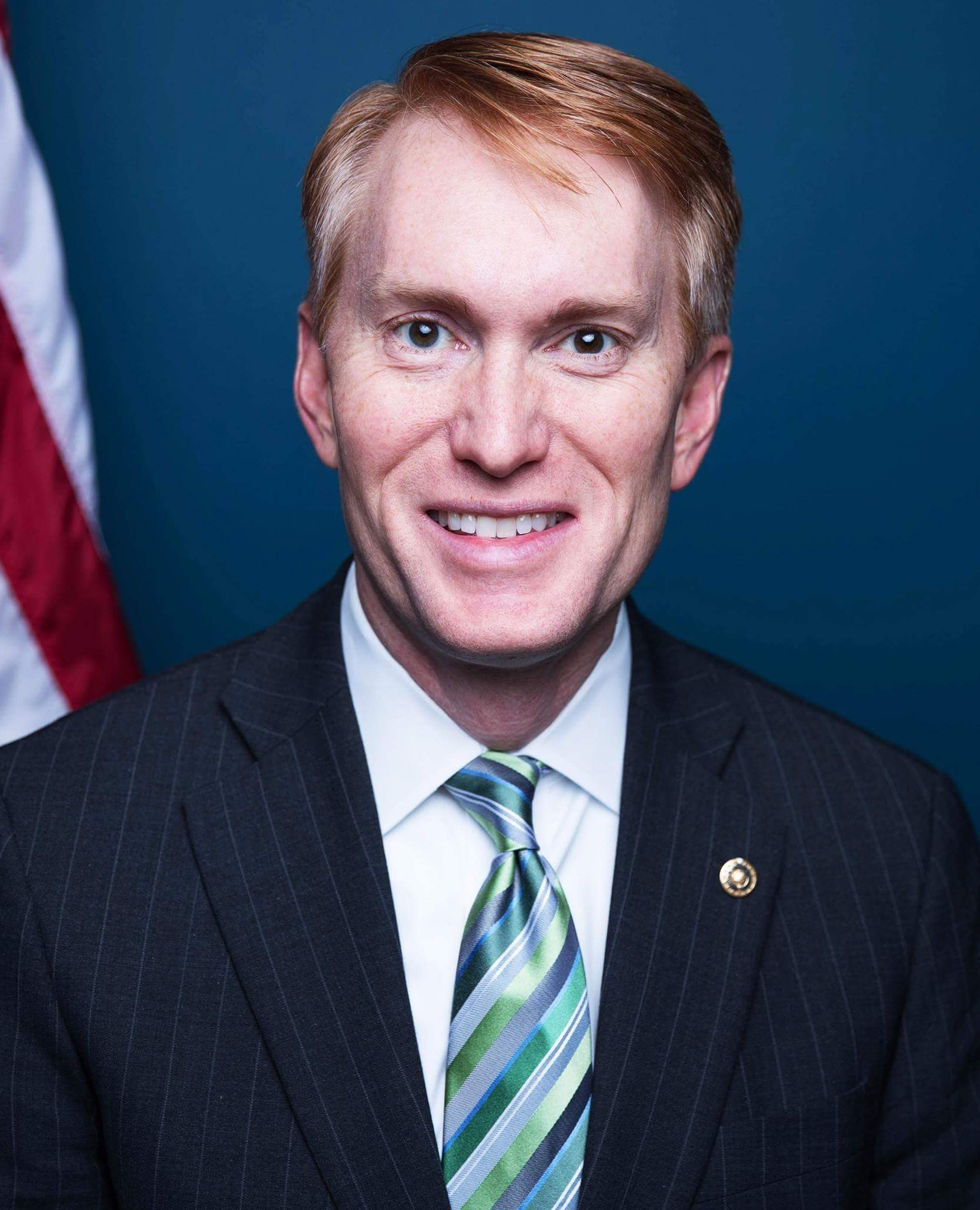

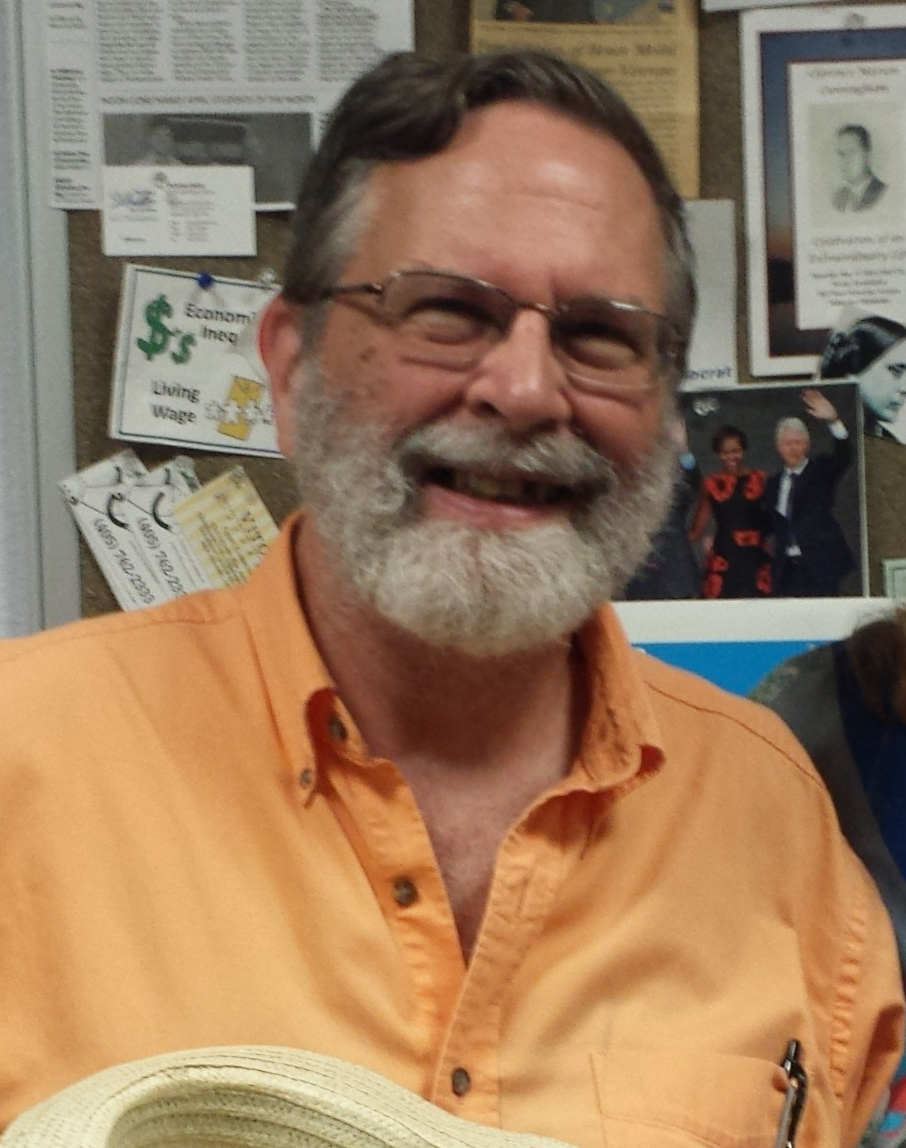
| Nominee | James Lankford | Mike Workman |
| Party | Republican | Democratic |
| Popular vote | 980,892 | 355,911 |
| Percentage | 67.7% | 24.6% |
- Lankford: 50–60% 60–70% 70–80% 80–90%
U.S. senator before election
James Lankford
Republican
Elected U.S. Senator
James Lankford
Republican

Two-term senator Tom Coburn (Republican) was re-elected with 71% of the vote in 2010, but chose to leave office before the end of his term after being diagnosed with prostate cancer. James Lankford won the 2014 special election to serve the remainder of Coburn's term. Lankford ran for re-election.

Former Congressman Dan Boren was viewed by some Oklahoma political operatives as the only Democrat who could make the 2016 race competitive, but was seen as unlikely to run. Lankford's 2014 special election opponent Constance N. Johnson had also declined to run.

Libertarian primary election
| Party | Candidate | Votes | % |
|---|---|---|---|
| Libertarian | Robert Murphy | 1,537 | 58.89 |
| Libertarian | Dax Ewbank | 1,073 | 41.11 |
| Total votes | | 2,610 | 100.00 |

Oklahoma general election
| Party | Candidate | Votes | % |
|---|---|---|---|
| Republican | James Lankford (incumbent) | 980,892 | 67.74 |
| Democratic | Mike Workman | 355,911 | 24.58 |
| Libertarian | Robert T. Murphy | 43,421 | 3.00 |
| Independent | Sean Braddy | 40,405 | 2.79 |
| Independent | Mark T. Beard | 27,418 | 1.89 |
| Majority | | 624,981 | 43.16 |
| Total votes | | 1,448,047 | 100.00 |
| Republican hold | | | |

== Oregon ==
Oregon election
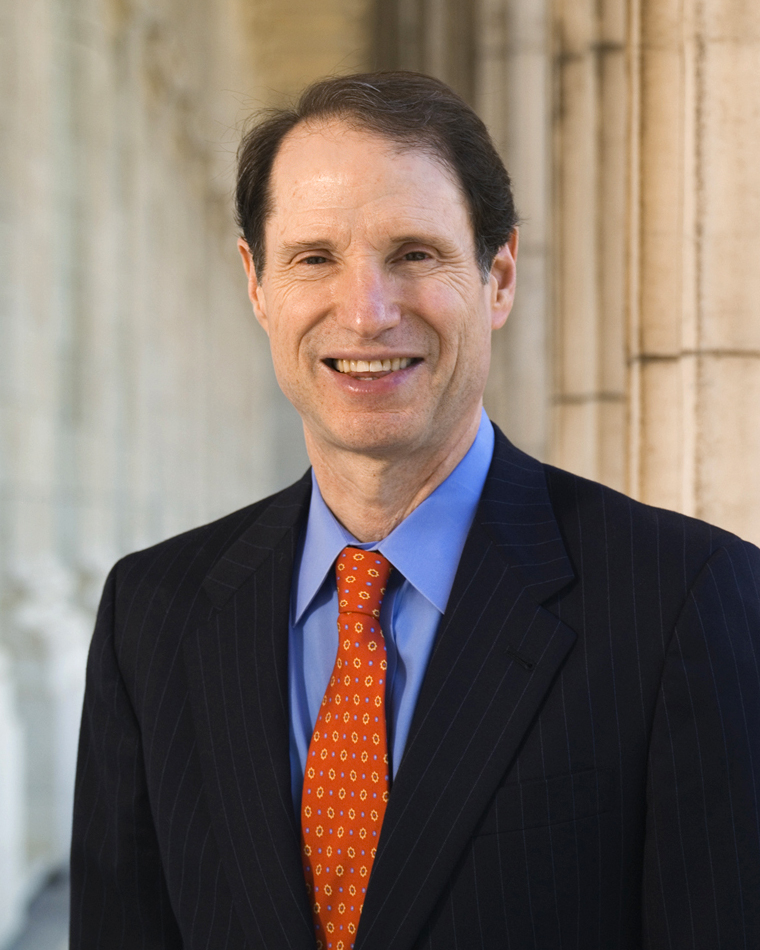

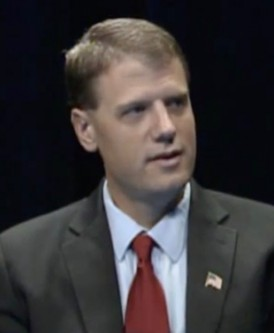
| Nominee | Ron Wyden | Mark Callahan |
| Party | Democratic | Republican |
| Popular vote | 1,105,119 | 651,106 |
| Percentage | 56.6% | 33.4% |
- Wyden: 40–50% 50–60% 60–70% 70–80% Callahan: 40–50% 50–60%
U.S. senator before election
Ron Wyden
Democratic
Elected U.S. Senator
Ron Wyden
Democratic

Three-term senator Ron Wyden (Democrat) was re-elected with 57% of the vote in 2010. He was 67 years old in 2016. He ran for re-election.

Medford City Councilor Kevin Stine and retired locomotive engineer Paul Weaver challenged Wyden for the Democratic nomination. Wyden won the Democratic nomination.

Information technology consultant and 2014 candidate Mark Callahan, businessman Sam Carpenter, business consultant Dan Laschober, Steven Reynolds, and Lane County commissioner Faye Stewart ran for the Republican nomination. Callahan won the Republican nomination.

Oregon Democratic primary election
| Party | Candidate | Votes | % |
|---|---|---|---|
| Democratic | Ron Wyden (incumbent) | 501,903 | 83.20 |
| Democratic | Kevin Stine | 78,287 | 12.98 |
| Democratic | Paul Weaver | 20,346 | 3.37 |
| | write-ins | 2,740 | 0.45 |
| Total votes | | 603,276 | 100.00 |

Oregon Republican primary election
| Party | Candidate | Votes | % |
|---|---|---|---|
| Republican | Mark Callahan | 123,473 | 38.24 |
| Republican | Sam Carpenter | 104,494 | 32.36 |
| Republican | Faye Stewart | 57,399 | 17.78 |
| Republican | Dan Laschober | 34,157 | 10.58 |
| | write-ins | 3,357 | 1.04 |
| Total votes | | 322,880 | 100.00 |

Independent primary election
| Party | Candidate | Votes | % |
|---|---|---|---|
| Independent Party (Oregon) | Steven Reynolds | 10,497 | 40.80 |
| Independent Party (Oregon) | Marvin Sandnes | 4,733 | 18.40 |
| | write-ins | 10,496 | 40.80 |
| Total votes | | 25,726 | 100.00 |

Oregon general election
| Party | Candidate | Votes | % |
|---|---|---|---|
| Democratic | Ron Wyden (incumbent) | 1,105,119 | 56.60 |
| Republican | Mark Callahan | 651,106 | 33.35 |
| Working Families | Shanti Lewallen | 61,915 | 3.17 |
| Independent Party (Oregon) | Steven Reynolds | 59,516 | 3.05 |
| Pacific Green | Eric Navickas | 48,823 | 2.50 |
| Libertarian | Jim Lindsay | 23,941 | 1.23 |
| Write-Ins | | 2,058 | 0.10 |
| Total votes | | 1,952,478 | 100.00 |
| Democratic hold | | | |

== Pennsylvania ==
Pennsylvania election
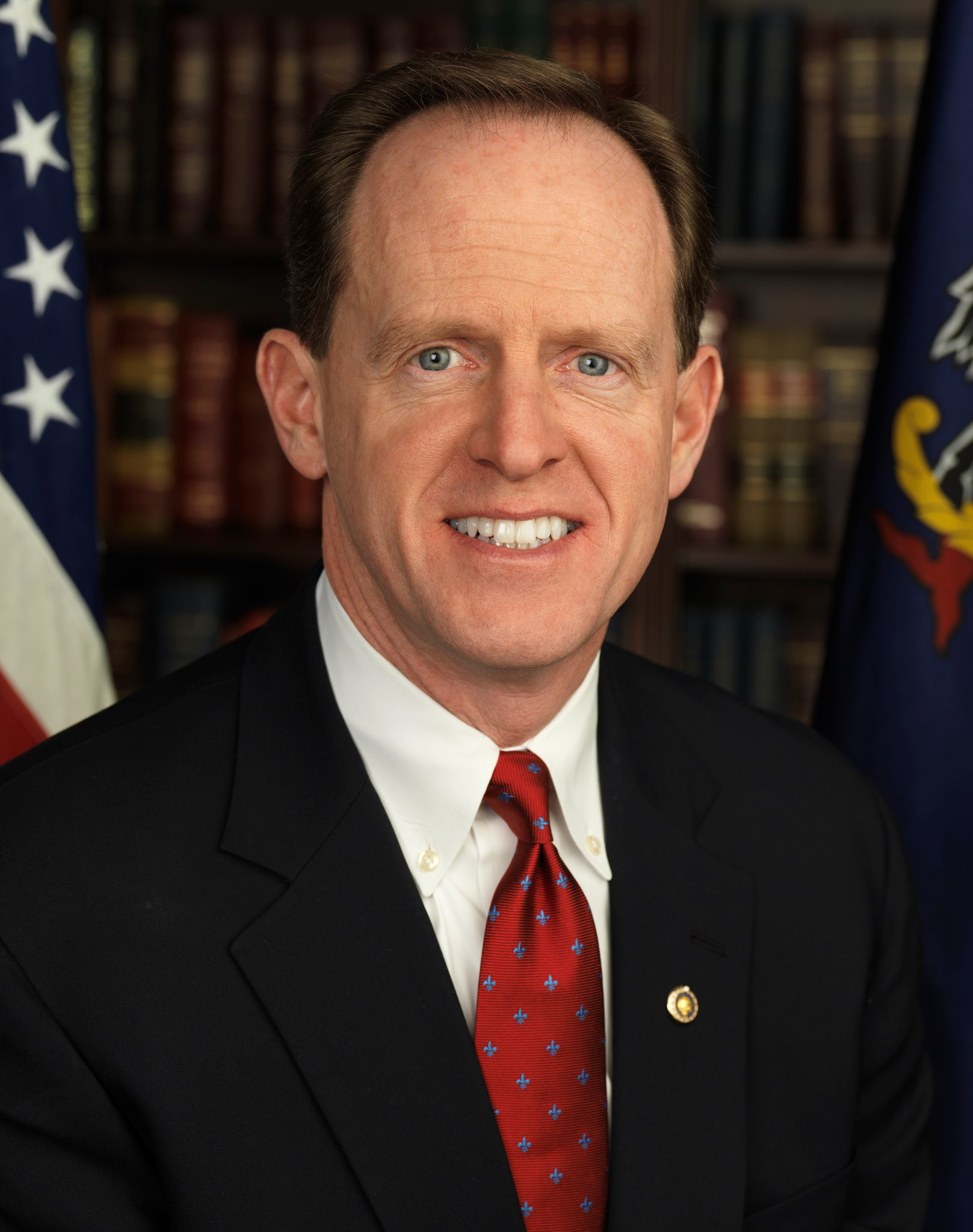

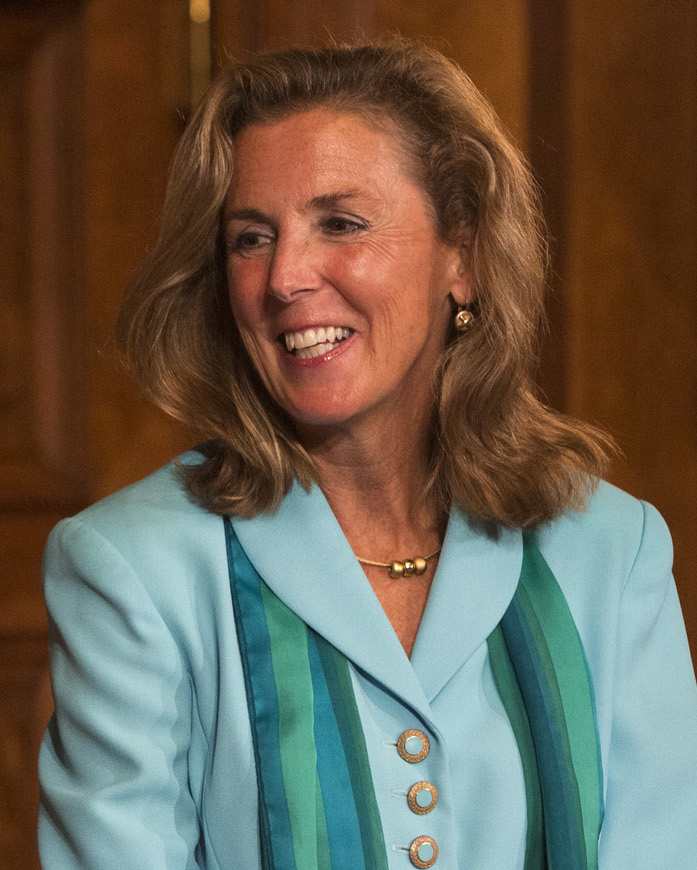
| Nominee | Pat Toomey | Katie McGinty |
| Party | Republican | Democratic |
| Popular vote | 2,951,702 | 2,865,012 |
| Percentage | 48.8% | 47.3% |
- Toomey: 40–50% 50–60% 60–70% 70–80% 80–90% McGinty: 40–50% 50–60% 80–90%
U.S. senator before election
Pat Toomey
Republican
Elected U.S. Senator
Pat Toomey
Republican

One-term senator Pat Toomey (Republican) was elected with 51% of the vote in 2010. He was 54 years old in 2016. Toomey ran for re-election.

Everett Stern, a security intelligence consultant and whistleblower of the HSBC money laundering scandal, announced that he would challenge Toomey for the Republican nomination, but missed the filing deadline, so Toomey was unopposed in the primary.

Democratic candidates included Katie McGinty, former chief of staff to Governor Tom Wolf and former secretary of the Pennsylvania Department of Environmental Protection; former Congressman Joe Sestak, who defeated incumbent senator Arlen Specter (a Democrat turned Republican turned back to Democrat) for the 2010 Democratic nomination, but lost to Toomey in the general election; then-current mayor of Braddock, Pennsylvania, John Fetterman, an AmeriCorps alum and Harvard University graduate; and small businessman and senate candidate in 2010 and 2012 Joseph Vodvarka. Allentown Mayor Ed Pawlowski announced his candidacy for the seat but suspended his campaign due to an FBI investigation of Allentown. McGinty won the primary and faced Toomey in the general election on November 8, 2016. Toomey defeated McGinty and retained the seat.

Pennsylvania Republican primary election
| Party | Candidate | Votes | % |
|---|---|---|---|
| Republican | Pat Toomey | 1,342,941 | 100.00 |
| Total votes | | 1,342,941 | 100.00 |

Pennsylvania Democratic primary election
| Party | Candidate | Votes | % |
|---|---|---|---|
| Democratic | Katie McGinty | 669,774 | 42.50 |
| Democratic | Joe Sestak | 513,221 | 32.57 |
| Democratic | John Fetterman | 307,090 | 19.49 |
| Democratic | Joseph Vodvarka | 85,837 | 5.45 |
| Total votes | | 1,575,922 | 100.00 |

Pennsylvania general election
| Party | Candidate | Votes | % | ±% |
|---|---|---|---|---|
| Republican | Pat Toomey (incumbent) | 2,951,702 | 48.77 | −2.24% |
| Democratic | Katie McGinty | 2,865,012 | 47.34 | −1.65% |
| Libertarian | Edward T. Clifford III | 235,142 | 3.89 | N/A |
| Total votes | | 6,051,941 | 100.00 | |
| Republican hold | | Swing | NA | |

== South Carolina ==
South Carolina election
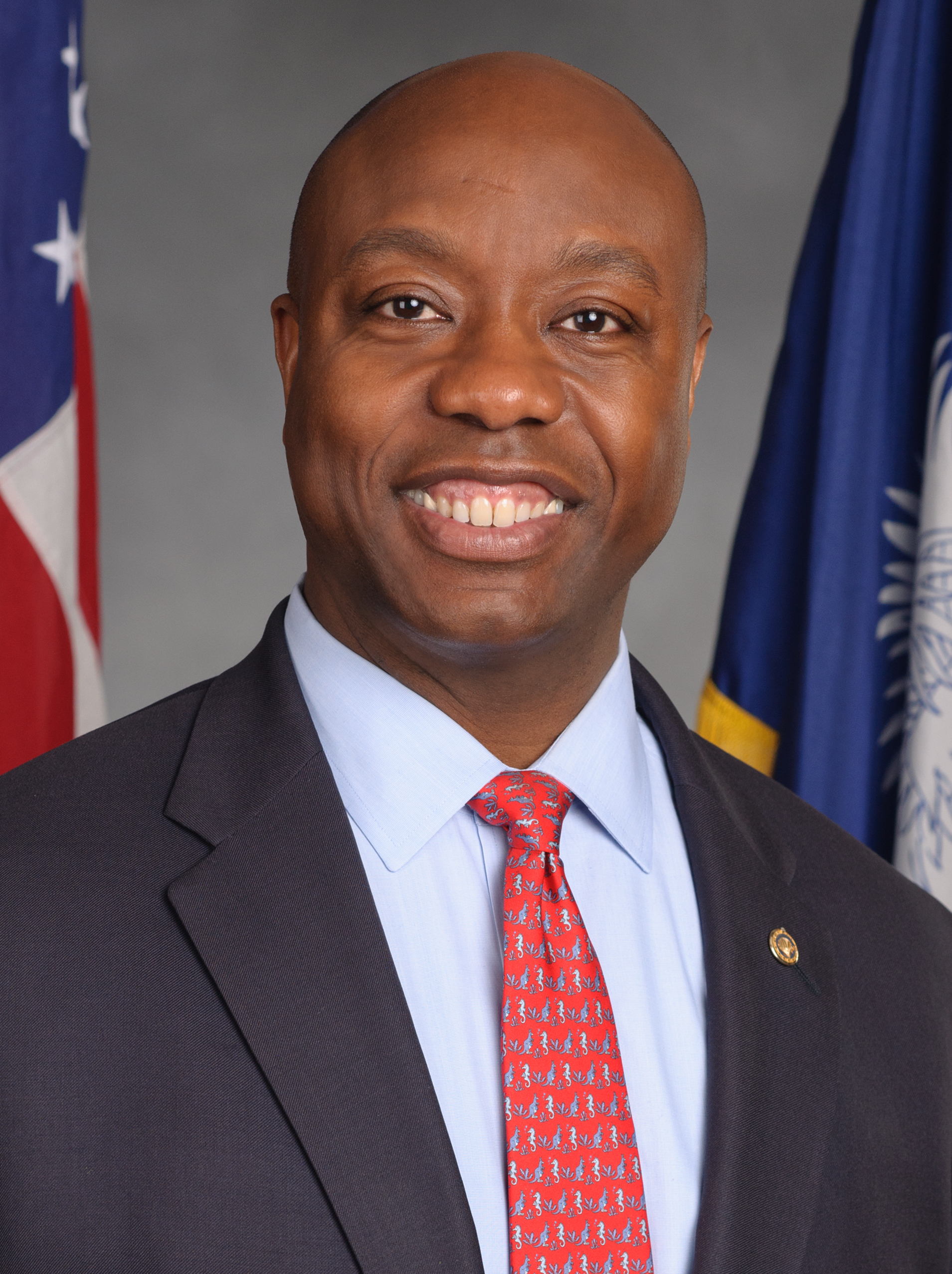

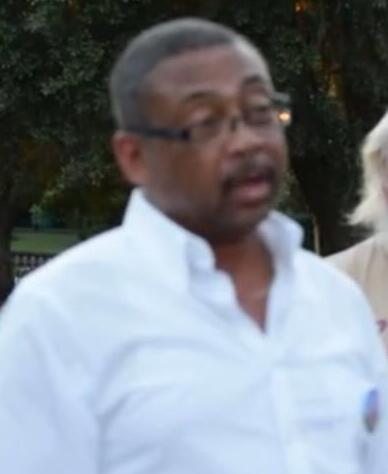
| Nominee | Tim Scott | Thomas Dixon |
| Party | Republican | Democratic |
| Popular vote | 1,241,609 | 757,022 |
| Percentage | 60.6% | 36.9% |
- Scott: 40–50% 50–60% 60–70% 70–80% Dixon: 40–50% 50–60% 60–70% 70–80%
U.S. senator before election
Tim Scott
Republican
Elected U.S. Senator
Tim Scott
Republican

Two-term Republican senator Jim DeMint (Republican) was re-elected with 61% of the vote in 2010. He resigned at the start of 2013 to become president of The Heritage Foundation, and U.S. representative Tim Scott (Republican) of South Carolina's 1st congressional district was appointed to replace DeMint by Governor Nikki Haley.

Scott subsequently won the special election in 2014 for the remaining two years of the term. He ran for re-election and was a potential Republican vice presidential nominee.

Other potential Republican candidates included Congressmen Mick Mulvaney, Jeff Duncan, Mark Sanford; State Senator Tom Davis; State Treasurer Curtis Loftis; and State Attorney General Alan Wilson. Darla Moore was mentioned as a potential candidate for either party.

On the Democratic side, Pastor Thomas Dixon ran in the general election on November 8, 2016 but was defeated by the incumbent, Scott.

South Carolina general election
| Party | Candidate | Votes | % | ±% |
|---|---|---|---|---|
| Republican | Tim Scott (incumbent) | 1,241,609 | 60.57 | −0.55% |
| Democratic | Thomas Dixon | 757,022 | 36.93 | −0.16% |
| Libertarian | Bill Bledsoe | 37,482 | 1.83 | N/A |
| American | Michael Scarborough | 11,923 | 0.58 | N/A |
| Other | Write-Ins | 1,857 | 0.09 | +0.05% |
| Majority | | 484,587 | 23.62 | −0.41% |
| Turnout | | 2,049,893 | 65.75 | +22.75% |
| Republican hold | | Swing | | |

== South Dakota ==
South Dakota election
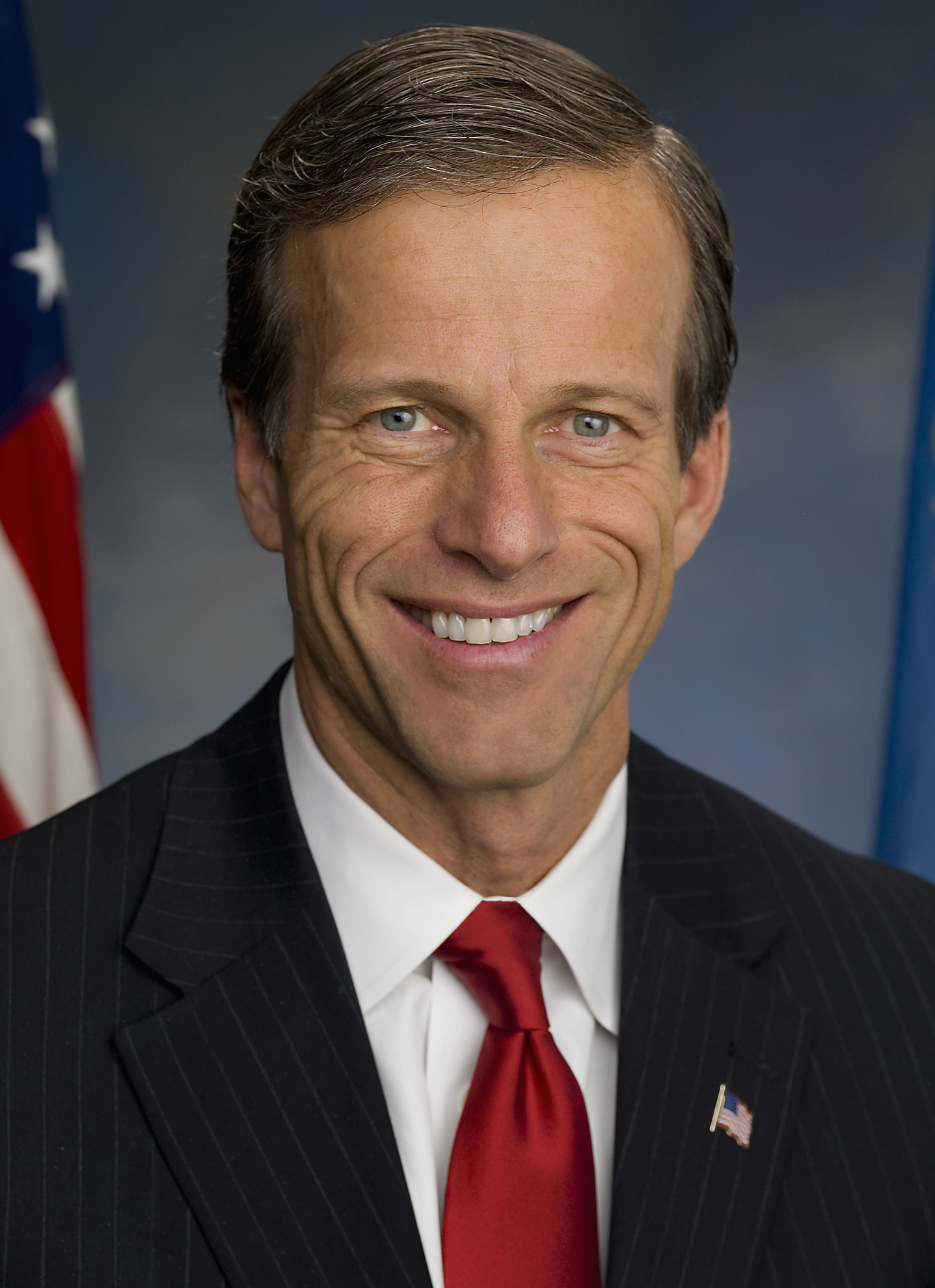

| Nominee | John Thune | Jay Williams |
| Party | Republican | Democratic |
| Popular vote | 265,516 | 104,140 |
| Percentage | 71.8% | 28.2% |
- Thune: 50–60% 60–70% 70–80% 80–90% >90% Williams: 50–60% 60–70% 70–80%
U.S. senator before election
John Thune
Republican
Elected U.S. Senator
John Thune
Republican

Two-term senator John Thune (Republican) ran unopposed and was re-elected with 100% in 2010.

Jay Williams, Chair of the Yankton County Democratic Party, and candidate for the state House in 2010 and 2014, ran for the Democratic nomination. Other potential Democratic candidates included State Senator Bernie Hunhoff and filmmaker and former television news producer Sam Hurst.

Former U.S. representative Stephanie Herseth Sandlin, Sioux Falls Mayor Mike Heuther, and 2014 nominee Rick Weiland all declined to run.

South Dakota general election
| Party | Candidate | Votes | % |
|---|---|---|---|
| Republican | John Thune (incumbent) | 265,494 | 71.83 |
| Democratic | Jay Williams | 104,125 | 28.17 |
| Majority | | 161,369 | 43.66 |
| Total votes | | 369,619 | 100.00 |
| Republican hold | | | |

== Utah ==
Utah election
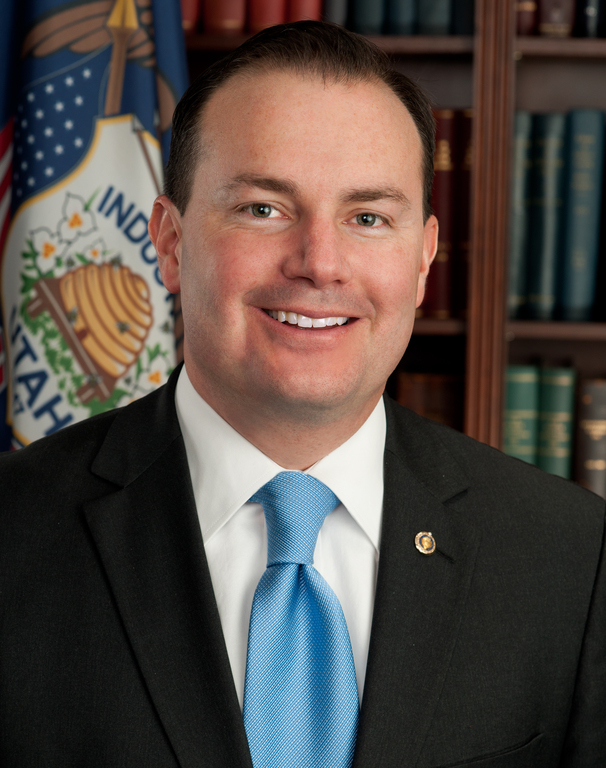

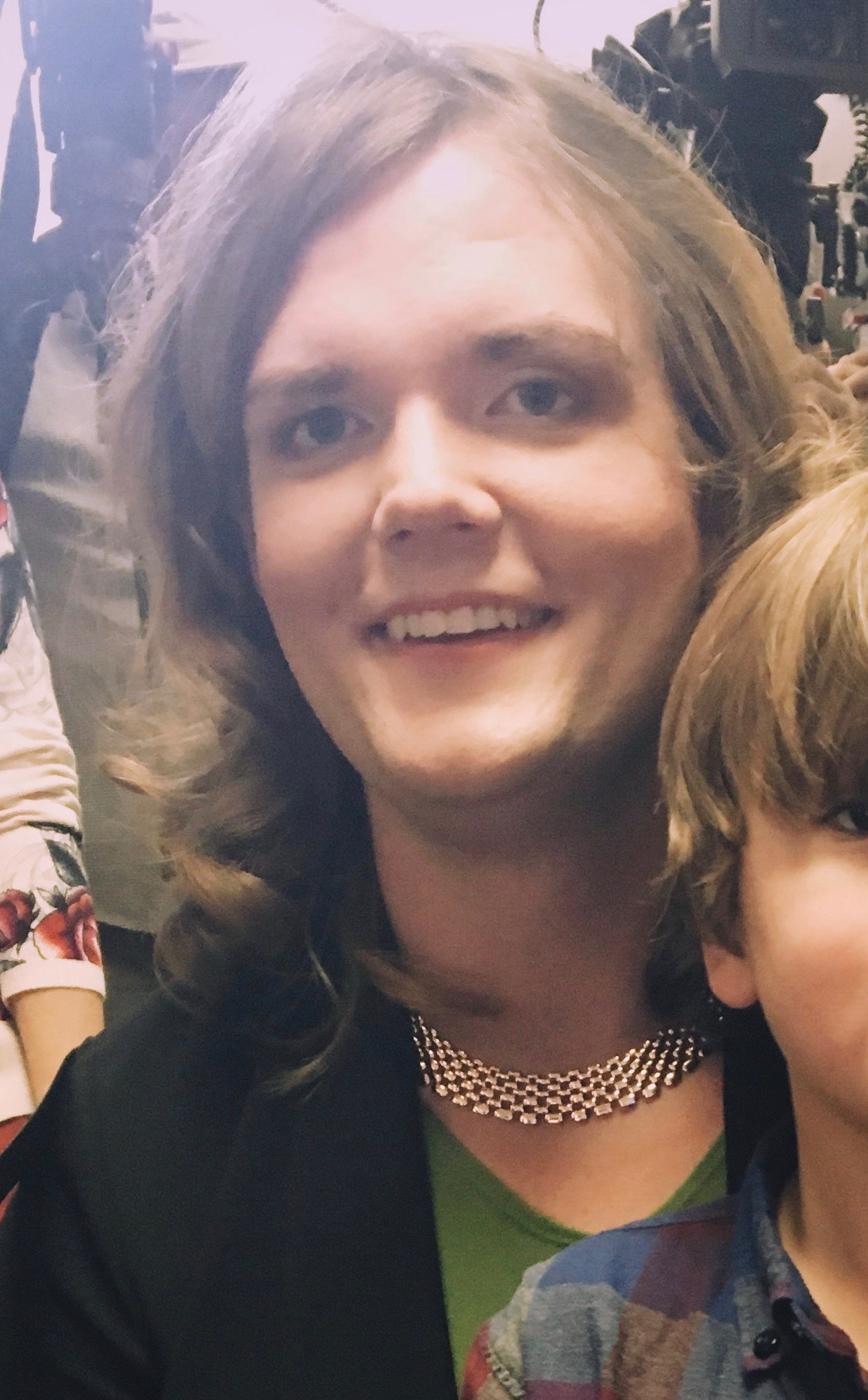
| Nominee | Mike Lee | Misty Snow |
| Party | Republican | Democratic |
| Popular vote | 760,241 | 301,860 |
| Percentage | 68.2% | 27.1% |
- Lee: 40–50% 50–60% 60–70% 70–80% 80–90% Snow: 40–50%
U.S. senator before election
Mike Lee
Republican
Elected U.S. Senator
Mike Lee
Republican

One-term senator Mike Lee (Republican) was elected with 62% of the vote in 2010. He was 45 years old in 2016. He ran for re-election. State party chair Thomas Wright, former state senator Dan Liljenquist, State Senator Aaron Osmond, Congressman Jason Chaffetz, Congressman Chris Stewart, former governor of Utah Mike Leavitt, and Mitt Romney's son Josh Romney were mentioned as potential primary challengers, but all declined to run. Lee ran unopposed at the Utah Republican convention, and was the Republican nominee.

Marriage therapist Jonathan Swinton and grocery store clerk Misty Snow, a transgender woman, ran for the Democratic nomination. Snow defeated Swinton by more than 20 percentage points, running to the left of Swinton, criticizing him for supporting limitations on abortion rights. She became the first transgender woman to become a major party's nominee for the Senate.

Utah Democratic primary election
| Party | Candidate | Votes | % |
|---|---|---|---|
| Democratic | Misty K. Snow | 28,928 | 59.40 |
| Democratic | Jonathan Swinton | 19,774 | 40.60 |
| Total votes | | 48,702 | 100.00 |

Utah general election
| Party | Candidate | Votes | % | ±% |
|---|---|---|---|---|
| Republican | Mike Lee (incumbent) | 760,241 | 68.15 | +6.59% |
| Democratic | Misty Snow | 301,860 | 27.06 | −5.71% |
| Independent American | Stoney Fonua | 27,340 | 2.45 | N/A |
| Unaffiliated | Bill Barron | 26,167 | 2.34 | N/A |
| Majority | | 458,381 | | |
| Total votes | | 1,115,608 | 100.00 | |
| Republican hold | | Swing | | |

== Vermont ==
Vermont election
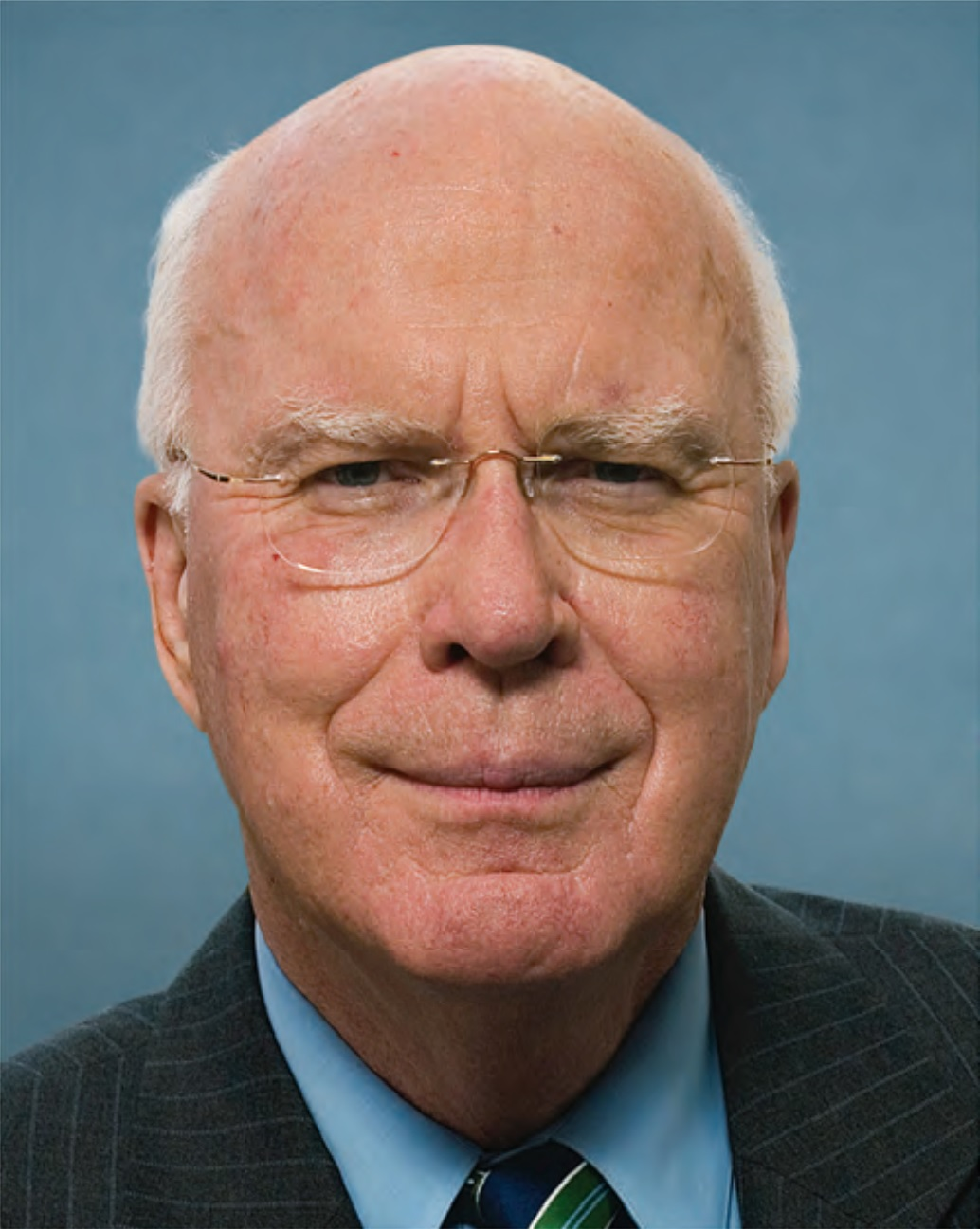

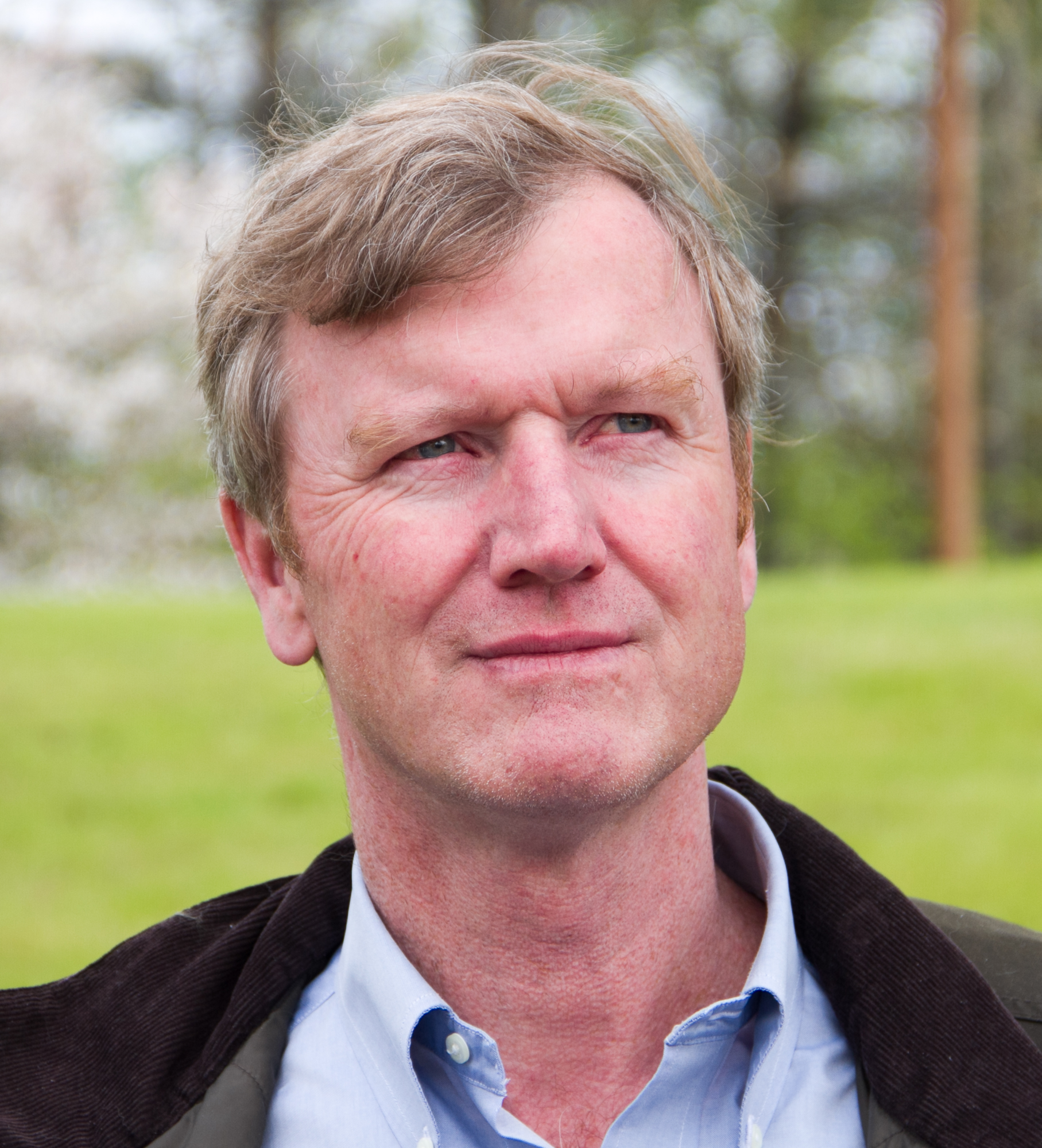
| Nominee | Patrick Leahy | Scott Milne |
| Party | Democratic | Republican |
| Popular vote | 192,243 | 103,637 |
| Percentage | 60.0% | 32.3% |
- Leahy: 40-50% 50-60% 60-70% 70-80% 80-90% Milne: 40-50% 50-60% 60-70%
U.S. senator before election
Patrick Leahy
Democratic
Elected U.S. Senator
Patrick Leahy
Democratic

Seven-term Democratic Senator Patrick Leahy was re-elected with 64% of the vote in 2010. Leahy won re-election in 2016, aged 76.

Scott Milne, the Republican nominee who narrowly lost the 2014 Vermont gubernatorial election, ran unsuccessfully against Leahy.

Vermont Democratic primary election
| Party | Candidate | Votes | % |
|---|---|---|---|
| Democratic | Patrick Leahy (incumbent) | 62,412 | 89.15 |
| Democratic | Cris Ericson | 7,595 | 10.85 |
| Total votes | | 70,007 | 100.00 |

Vermont general election
| Party | Candidate | Votes | % | ±% |
|---|---|---|---|---|
| Democratic | Patrick Leahy (incumbent) | 192,243 | 59.99 | −3.05% |
| Republican | Scott Milne | 103,637 | 32.34 | +2.08% |
| Marijuana | Cris Ericson | 9,156 | 2.86 | +1.76% |
| Independent | Jerry Trudell | 5,223 | 1.63 | N/A |
| Liberty Union | Peter Diamondstone | 3,241 | 1.01 | 0.40% |
| Write-ins | | 309 | 0.10 | N/A |
| Spoiled votes | | 466 | 0.15 | N/A |
| Blank votes | | 6,192 | 1.93 | N/A |
| Majority | | 88,606 | 27.65 | |
| Total votes | | 320,467 | 100.00 | |
| Democratic hold | | Swing | | |

== Washington ==
Washington election
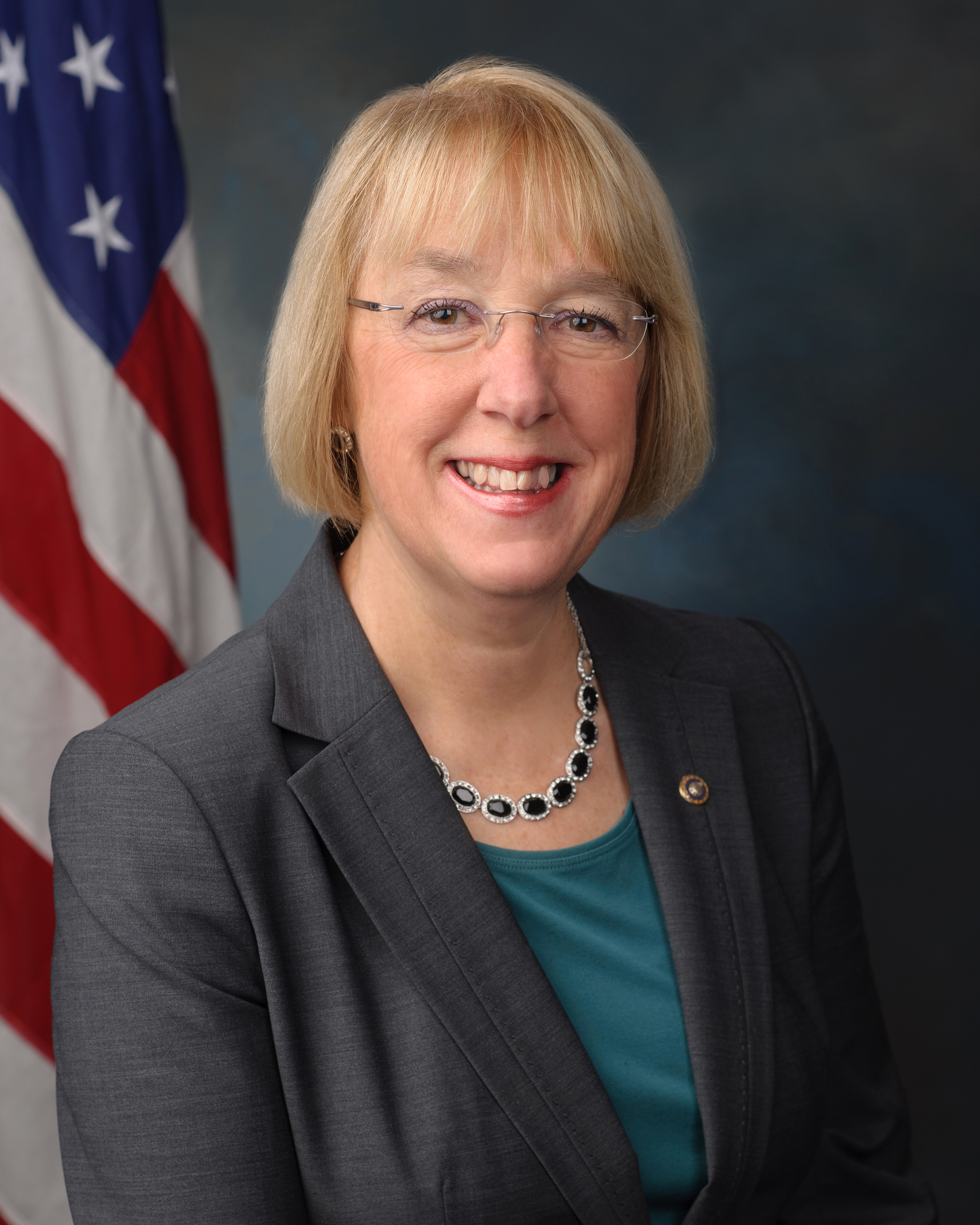

| Nominee | Patty Murray | Chris Vance |
| Party | Democratic | Republican |
| Popular vote | 1,913,979 | 1,329,338 |
| Percentage | 59.0% | 41.0% |
- Murray: 50–60% 60–70% 70–80% Vance: 50–60% 60–70%
U.S. senator before election
Patty Murray
Democratic
Elected U.S. Senator
Patty Murray
Democratic

Four-term senator Patty Murray (Democrat) was re-elected with 52% of the vote in 2010. She ran successfully for re-election against Republican candidate Chris Vance. Congressman Dave Reichert was considered a potential Republican candidate but chose to run for reelection.

Washington Blanket primary election
| Party | Candidate | Votes | % |
|---|---|---|---|
| Democratic | Patty Murray (incumbent) | 745,421 | 53.82 |
| Republican | Chris Vance | 381,004 | 27.51 |
| Republican | Eric John Makus | 57,825 | 4.18 |
| Democratic | Phil Cornell | 46,460 | 3.35 |
| Republican | Scott Nazarino | 41,542 | 3.00 |
| Libertarian | Mike Luke | 20,988 | 1.52 |
| Democratic | Mohammad Said | 13,362 | 0.96 |
| Conservative | Donna Rae Lands | 11,472 | 0.83 |
| Independent | Ted Cummings | 11,028 | 0.80 |
| Independent | Sam Wright | 10,751 | 0.78 |
| Republican | Uncle Mover | 8,569 | 0.62 |
| Independent | Jeremy Teuton | 7,991 | 0.58 |
| Democratic | Thor Amundson | 7,906 | 0.57 |
| Independent | Chuck Jackson | 6,318 | 0.46 |
| Independent | Pano Churchill | 5,150 | 0.37 |
| Independent | Zach Haller | 5,092 | 0.37 |
| Independent | Alex Tsimerman | 4,117 | 0.30 |
| Total votes | | 1,384,996 | 100.00 |

Washington general election
| Party | Candidate | Votes | % | ±% |
|---|---|---|---|---|
| Democratic | Patty Murray (incumbent) | 1,913,979 | 59.01 | +6.65% |
| Republican | Chris Vance | 1,329,338 | 40.99 | −6.65% |
| Majority | | 584,641 | 18.03 | +13.30% |
| Total votes | | 3,243,317 | 100.00 | 29.16% |
| Democratic hold | | Swing | | |

== Wisconsin ==
Wisconsin election
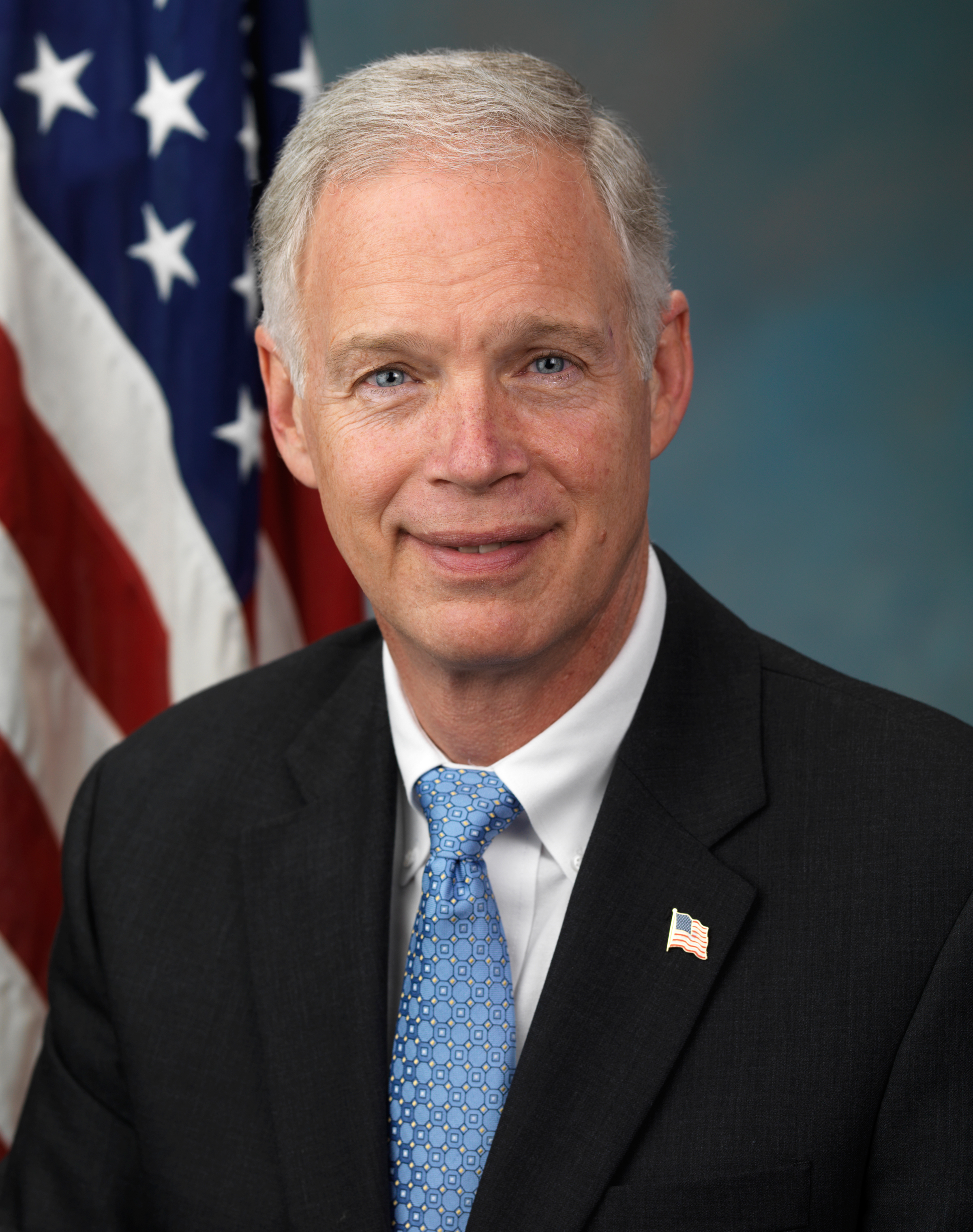

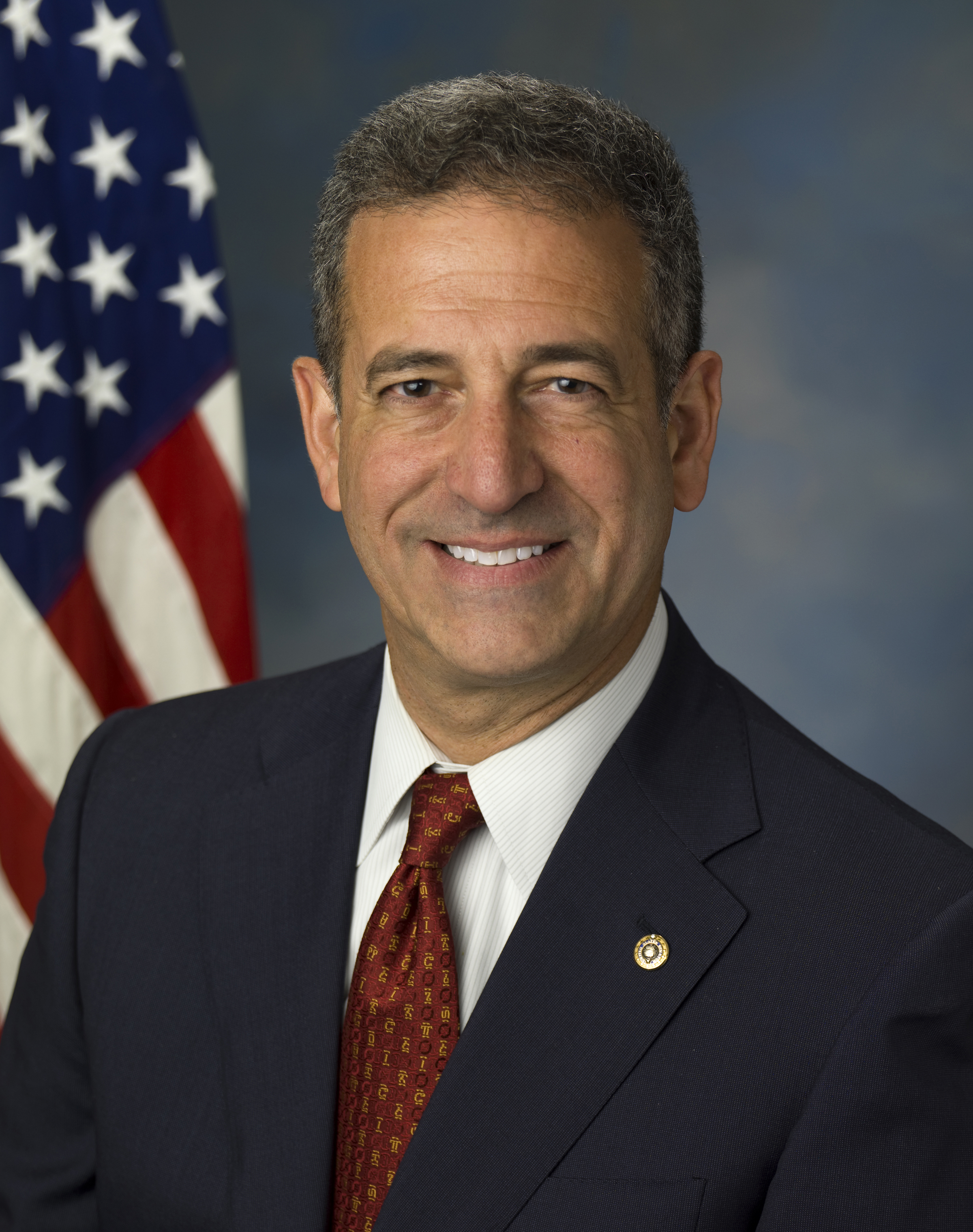
| Nominee | Ron Johnson | Russ Feingold |
| Party | Republican | Democratic |
| Popular vote | 1,479,471 | 1,380,335 |
| Percentage | 50.2% | 46.8% |
- Johnson: 40–50% 50–60% 60–70% 70–80% Feingold: 40–50% 50–60% 60–70% 70–80%
U.S. senator before election
Ron Johnson
Republican
Elected U.S. Senator
Ron Johnson
Republican

One-term senator Ron Johnson (Republican) defeated three-term senator Russ Feingold (Democrat) with 52% of the vote in 2010.

On May 14, 2015, Feingold announced that he would seek a rematch against Johnson for his former Senate seat. Immediately after his announcement, the Democratic Senatorial Campaign Committee endorsed Feingold's candidacy. Businesswoman and 2014 gubernatorial nominee Mary Burke declared that she was not seeking statewide office in 2016.

Johnson and Feingold faced each other again, and Johnson again defeated Feingold, in what many observers and pundits considered to be a surprising and uphill victory.

Democratic primary
| Party | Candidate | Votes | % |
|---|---|---|---|
| Democratic | Russ Feingold | 303,282 | 90.14 |
| Democratic | Scott Harbach | 33,185 | 9.86 |
| Total votes | | 336,467 | 100.00 |

Wisconsin general election
| Party | Candidate | Votes | % | ±% |
|---|---|---|---|---|
| Republican | Ron Johnson (incumbent) | 1,479,471 | 50.2 | −1.7% |
| Democratic | Russ Feingold | 1,380,335 | 46.8 | −0.2% |
| Libertarian | Phillip Anderson | 87,531 | 3.0 | N/A |
| | Write-In Votes | 8 | 0.0 | N/A |
| Majority | | 99,136 | 3.4 | −1.5% |
| Turnout | | 2,947,345 | 100.0 | |
| Republican hold | | | | |

== See also ==
- 2016 United States elections (other elections being held at the same time)
  - 2016 United States House of Representatives elections
  - 2016 United States presidential election
  - 2016 United States gubernatorial elections
- 2010 United States Senate elections (the previous election for this class of senators)
