= 2016 United States Senate election in Alabama =

- November 8, 2016
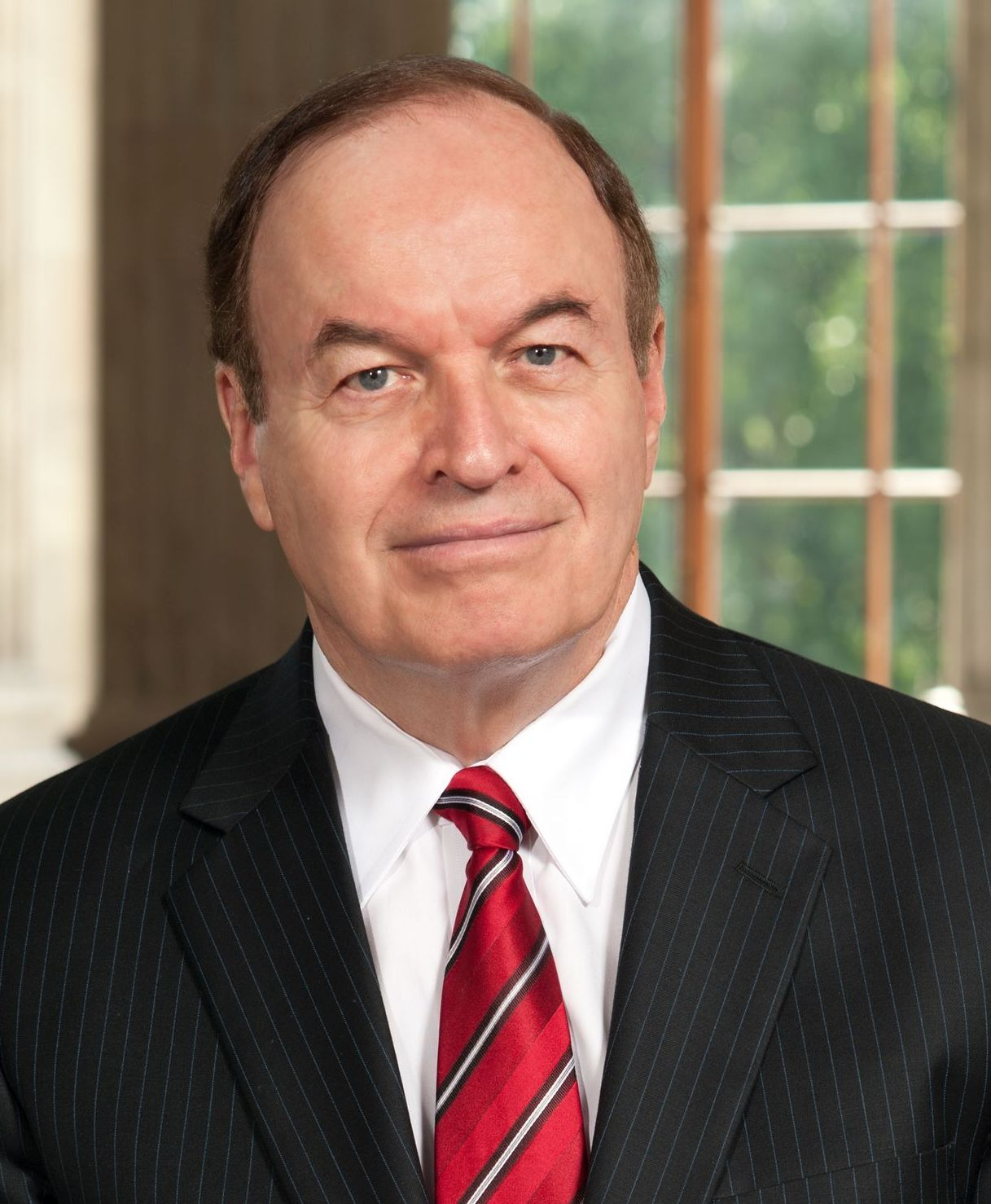

Nominee	Richard Shelby	Ron Crumpton
Party	Republican	Democratic
Popular vote	1,335,104	748,709
Percentage	63.96%	35.87%
- Shelby: 50–60% 60–70% 70–80% 80–90% >90% Crumpton: 50–60% 60–70% 70–80% 80–90% >90% Tie: 40–50%
U.S. senator before election
Richard Shelby
Republican
Elected U.S. Senator
Richard Shelby
Republican

The 2016 United States Senate election in Alabama was held on November 8, 2016, to elect a member of the United States Senate to represent the State of Alabama, concurrently with the 2016 U.S. presidential election, as well as other elections to the United States Senate in other states and elections to the United States House of Representatives, and various state and local elections.

Incumbent Republican Senator Richard Shelby won re-election to a sixth and final term in office. The primaries were held on March 1. Ron Crumpton, a marijuana legalization activist, was the Democratic nominee. Shelby won re-election with 63.96% of the vote. Despite an overwhelming victory statewide, this marked Shelby's first and only race as either a Republican or Democrat in which he failed to carry Jefferson County, home of Birmingham, the state's largest city. In Jefferson, Crumpton took 51.99% (156,574 votes) to Shelby's 47.86% (144,136 votes); this shift was due in part to increased Democratic support in core urban areas across the nation.

== Background ==
Shelby was first elected to the Senate in 1986 as a Democrat and was easily re-elected in 1992 as such. He switched his party affiliation to Republican on November 9, 1994, one day after the Republicans won control of both houses in the midterm elections. He won his first full term as a Republican in 1998 by a large margin and faced no significant opposition in 2004 or 2010.

== Republican primary ==
Following the divisive Republican primary in Mississippi ahead of the 2014 election in which Senator Thad Cochran was almost defeated, it had been speculated that Shelby could also face a Tea Party primary challenger, due to his lengthy tenure and support for federal largesse. However, that did not happen, in part due to his large campaign war chest, which stood at $19.4 million as of September 2015. If Shelby had decided to retire, numerous high-profile Alabama Republicans were speculated to run, including U.S. Representatives Robert Aderholt, Mo Brooks, Bradley Byrne, Gary Palmer, Martha Roby, and Mike Rogers, State Treasurer Young Boozer, State Speaker Mike Hubbard, Lieutenant Governor Kay Ivey, State Senate President Pro Tempore Del Marsh, Secretary of State John Merrill, U.S. Appeals Court Judge William H. Pryor Jr., former governor Bob Riley, and Attorney General Luther Strange. Shelby announced in January 2015 that he would run for re-election.

=== Candidates ===
==== Declared ====
- Marcus Bowman, Uber driver
- John Martin, pilot and candidate for AL-02 in 2008
- Jonathan McConnell, businessman
- Shadrack McGill, former state senator and candidate for Jackson County Revenue Commissioner in 2014
- Richard Shelby, incumbent U.S. senator since 1987

=== Endorsements ===
Jonathan McConnell

Individuals

- John Rice, former state senator, candidate for AL-03 in 1989 and candidate for Public Service Commission in 2006

Organizations

- Citizens United
Richard Shelby

Organizations

- Business Council of Alabama

=== Polling ===
Poll source	Date(s) administered	Sample size	Margin of error	Marcus Bowman	John Martin	Shadrack McGill	Jonathan McConnell	Richard Shelby	Undecided
Thomas Partners Strategies (R-McConnell)	January 29–30, 2016	1,299	± 2.7%	1%	1%	2%	25%	55%	16%
McLaughlin & Associates (R-Shelby)	January 25–26, 2016	600	± 4.0%	1%	1%	1%	9%	75%	13%
Thomas Partners Strategies (R-McConnell)	December 2015	–	–	1%	2%	3%	15%	64%	21%
McLaughlin & Associates (R-Shelby)	November 2015	–	–	1%	2%	1%	5%	71%	20%

Hypothetical polling

Poll source	Date(s) administered	Sample size	Margin of error	Richard Shelby	Someone Else	Undecided
Thomas Partners Strategies (R-McConnell)	January 29–30, 2016	1,299	±2.7%	55%	29%	16%
Thomas Partners Strategies (R-McConnell)	December 2015	?	±?%	64%	15%	21%
Thomas Partners Strategies (R-McConnell)	October 2015	?	±?%	53%	22%	26%

=== Primary results ===
Results by county Shelby: 50–60%; 60–70%; 70–80%; 80–90%

Republican primary results
Party	Candidate	Votes	%
Republican	Richard Shelby (incumbent)	505,586	64.91%
Republican	Jonathan McConnell	214,770	27.58%
Republican	John Martin	23,558	3.02%
Republican	Marcus Bowman	19,707	2.53%
Republican	Shadrack McGill	15,230	1.96%
Total votes		778,851	100.00%

== Democratic primary ==
=== Candidates ===
==== Declared ====
- Ron Crumpton, marijuana legalization activist and nominee for the State Senate in 2014
- Charles Nana, process engineer

==== Failed to qualify ====
- Reginald Hill, candidate for Huntsville School Board in 2012 and write-in candidate for AL-05 in 2014

==== Declined ====
- Stephen Black, non-profit executive
- Bobby Bright, former U.S. representative
- Sue Bell Cobb, former chief justice of the Supreme Court of Alabama
- Marsha Folsom, businesswoman, former First Lady of Alabama, and nominee for Alabama's 4th congressional district in 2000
- Parker Griffith, former U.S. representative, and nominee for governor of Alabama in 2014
- Walt Maddox, mayor of Tuscaloosa
- Terri Sewell, U.S. representative (running for re-election)

=== Primary results ===
Results by county Crumpton: 50–60%; 60–70%; 70–80%; 80–90%; Nana: 50–60%; 60–70%

Democratic primary results
Party	Candidate	Votes	%
Democratic	Ron Crumpton	145,681	55.97%
Democratic	Charles Nana	114,617	44.03%
Total votes		260,298	100.00%

== General election ==
=== Candidates ===
- Ron Crumpton (D), marijuana legalization activist and nominee for the State Senate in 2014
- Charles Nana (D) (write-in), process engineer (previously sought the Democratic nomination)
- Richard Shelby (R), incumbent senator

=== Predictions ===
Source	Ranking	As of
The Cook Political Report	Safe R	November 2, 2016
Sabato's Crystal Ball	Safe R	November 7, 2016
Rothenberg Political Report	Safe R	November 3, 2016
Daily Kos	Safe R	November 8, 2016
Real Clear Politics	Safe R	November 7, 2016

=== Polling ===
Poll source	Date(s) administered	Sample size	Margin of error	Richard Shelby (R)	Ron Crumpton (D)	Undecided
SurveyMonkey	November 1–7, 2016	1,131	± 4.6%	57%	38%	5%
SurveyMonkey	October 31 – November 6, 2016	971	± 4.6%	58%	37%	5%
SurveyMonkey	October 28 – November 3, 2016	722	± 4.6%	57%	38%	5%
SurveyMonkey	October 27 – November 2, 2016	621	± 4.6%	58%	37%	5%
SurveyMonkey	October 26 – November 1, 2016	503	± 4.6%	56%	40%	4%
SurveyMonkey	October 25–31, 2016	485	± 4.6%	60%	36%	4%
Google Consumer Surveys	October 18–20, 2016	474	± 4.2%	71%	26%	3%

=== Results ===
2016 United States Senate election in Alabama
Party	Candidate	Votes	%	±%
Republican	Richard Shelby (incumbent)	1,335,104	63.96%	–1.22%
Democratic	Ron Crumpton	748,709	35.87%	+1.16%
Write-in		3,631	0.17%	+0.06%
Total votes		2,087,444	100.00%	N/A
Republican hold				

==== By county ====
County	Richard Shelby Republican		Ron Crumpton Democratic		Write-in Various		Margin		Total
County	#	%	#	%	#	%	#	%	Total
Autauga	18,220	74.03%	6,331	25.72%	62	0.25%	11,889	48.30%	24,613
Baldwin	74,021	79.24%	19,145	20.49%	248	0.27%	54,876	58.74%	93,414
Barbour	5,436	53.14%	4,777	46.70%	16	0.16%	659	6.44%	10,229
Bibb	6,612	75.90%	2,082	23.90%	17	0.20%	4,530	52.00%	8,711
Blount	22,169	87.98%	2,980	11.83%	48	0.19%	19,189	76.16%	25,197
Bullock	1,167	25.72%	3,364	74.15%	6	0.13%	-2,197	-48.42%	4,537
Butler	4,840	56.87%	3,663	43.04%	7	0.08%	1,177	13.83%	8,510
Calhoun	32,976	69.87%	14,152	29.98%	69	0.15%	18,824	39.88%	47,197
Chambers	7,865	57.29%	5,845	42.58%	18	0.13%	2,020	14.71%	13,728
Cherokee	8,636	81.80%	1,915	18.14%	7	0.07%	6,721	63.66%	10,558
Chilton	14,582	81.31%	3,327	18.55%	25	0.14%	11,255	62.76%	17,934
Choctaw	4,035	57.36%	2,992	42.53%	8	0.11%	1,043	14.83%	7,035
Clarke	7,158	56.23%	5,558	43.66%	14	0.11%	1,600	12.57%	12,730
Clay	5,147	78.84%	1,377	21.09%	4	0.06%	3,770	57.75%	6,528
Cleburne	5,554	86.69%	847	13.22%	6	0.09%	4,707	73.47%	6,407
Coffee	15,745	77.59%	4,498	22.17%	49	0.24%	11,247	55.43%	20,292
Colbert	15,866	65.19%	8,443	34.69%	28	0.12%	7,423	30.50%	24,337
Conecuh	3,298	52.26%	3,006	47.63%	7	0.11%	292	4.63%	6,311
Coosa	3,378	65.29%	1,788	34.56%	8	0.15%	1,590	30.73%	5,174
Covington	12,690	82.05%	2,740	17.72%	36	0.23%	9,950	64.33%	15,466
Crenshaw	4,392	71.57%	1,734	28.25%	11	0.18%	2,658	43.31%	6,137
Cullman	32,001	85.87%	5,207	13.97%	57	0.15%	26,794	71.90%	37,265
Dale	13,652	74.46%	4,625	25.22%	58	0.32%	9,027	49.23%	18,335
Dallas	6,060	32.82%	12,388	67.10%	14	0.08%	-6,328	-34.28%	18,462
DeKalb	20,347	80.99%	4,749	18.90%	27	0.11%	15,598	62.09%	25,123
Elmore	27,591	75.54%	8,833	24.18%	102	0.28%	18,758	51.36%	36,526
Escambia	9,555	67.11%	4,625	32.48%	58	0.41%	4,930	34.63%	14,238
Etowah	31,441	72.27%	11,981	27.54%	84	0.19%	19,460	44.73%	43,506
Fayette	6,555	81.28%	1,497	18.56%	13	0.16%	5,058	62.72%	8,065
Franklin	8,670	75.17%	2,850	24.71%	14	0.12%	5,820	50.46%	11,534
Geneva	9,606	83.99%	1,803	15.76%	28	0.24%	7,803	68.23%	11,437
Greene	918	19.31%	3,834	80.63%	3	0.06%	-2,916	-61.32%	4,755
Hale	3,208	40.80%	4,650	59.14%	5	0.06%	-1,442	-18.34%	7,863
Henry	5,506	69.74%	2,366	29.97%	23	0.19%	3,140	39.77%	7,895
Houston	30,494	72.89%	11,219	26.82%	120	0.29%	19,275	46.08%	41,833
Jackson	15,742	77.54%	4,538	22.35%	21	0.10%	11,204	55.19%	20,301
Jefferson	144,136	47.86%	156,574	51.99%	453	0.15%	-12,438	-4.13%	301,163
Lamar	5,634	83.31%	1,125	16.63%	4	0.06%	4,509	66.67%	6,763
Lauderdale	27,092	69.85%	11,652	30.04%	43	0.11%	15,440	39.81%	38,787
Lawrence	10,254	71.01%	4,171	28.88%	16	0.11%	6,083	42.12%	14,441
Lee	36,684	62.93%	21,475	36.84%	135	0.23%	15,209	26.09%	58,294
Limestone	29,203	73.94%	10,233	25.91%	57	0.14%	18,970	48.03%	39,493
Lowndes	1,839	28.62%	4,580	71.27%	7	0.11%	-2,741	-42.65%	6,426
Macon	1,553	17.25%	7,442	82.65%	9	0.10%	-5,889	-65.40%	9,004
Madison	97,796	60.75%	62,870	39.05%	324	0.20%	34,926	21.69%	160,990
Marengo	5,294	49.39%	5,419	50.56%	5	0.05%	-125	-1.17%	10,718
Marion	10,753	84.40%	1,961	15.39%	27	0.21%	8,792	69.01%	12,741
Marshall	28,532	82.74%	5,898	17.10%	55	0.16%	22,634	65.63%	34,485
Mobile	97,911	57.63%	71,602	42.15%	379	0.22%	26,309	15.49%	169,892
Monroe	5,854	57.83%	4,255	42.04%	13	0.13%	1,599	15.80%	10,122
Montgomery	36,477	38.55%	57,972	61.27%	162	0.17%	-21,495	-22.72%	94,611
Morgan	37,448	75.15%	12,325	24.73%	57	0.11%	25,123	50.42%	49,830
Perry	1,496	29.03%	3,656	70.94%	2	0.04%	-2,160	-41.91%	5,154
Pickens	5,384	57.90%	3,908	42.03%	6	0.06%	1,476	15.87%	9,298
Pike	7,835	60.74%	5,037	39.05%	27	0.21%	2,798	21.69%	12,899
Randolph	7,454	75.39%	2,424	24.52%	9	0.09%	5,030	50.87%	9,887
Russell	9,408	49.72%	9,487	50.14%	26	0.14%	-79	-0.42%	18,921
Shelby	75,344	75.32%	24,483	24.48%	205	0.20%	50,861	50.84%	100,032
St. Clair	31,279	82.33%	6,635	17.46%	80	0.21%	24,644	64.86%	37,994
Sumter	1,656	26.41%	4,611	73.53%	4	0.06%	-2,955	-47.12%	6,271
Talladega	20,446	61.76%	12,632	38.16%	29	0.09%	7,814	23.60%	33,107
Tallapoosa	13,401	69.72%	5,804	30.19%	17	0.09%	7,597	39.52%	19,222
Tuscaloosa	49,923	61.14%	31,602	38.70%	130	0.16%	18,321	22.44%	81,655
Walker	23,419	80.68%	5,558	19.15%	49	0.17%	17,861	61.53%	29,026
Washington	5,830	70.26%	2,463	29.68%	5	0.06%	3,367	40.58%	8,298
Wilcox	1,819	32.02%	3,857	67.90%	4	0.07%	-2,038	-35.88%	5,680
Winston	8,817	87.31%	1,269	12.57%	12	0.12%	7,548	74.75%	10,098
Totals	1,335,104	63.96%	748,709	35.87%	3,631	0.17%	586,395	28.09%	2,087,444

Counties that flipped from Republican to Democratic

- Jefferson (largest municipality: Birmingham)

==== By congressional district ====
Shelby won six of seven congressional districts.

District	Shelby	Crumpton	Representative
1st	65%	34%	Bradley Byrne
2nd	66%	34%	Martha Roby
3rd	66%	34%	Mike Rogers
4th	79%	21%	Robert Aderholt
5th	67%	33%	Mo Brooks
6th	73%	27%	Gary Palmer
7th	31%	69%	Terri Sewell
