= 1992 United States presidential election in Alabama =

- November 3, 1992
- Turnout: 76.32% ▲
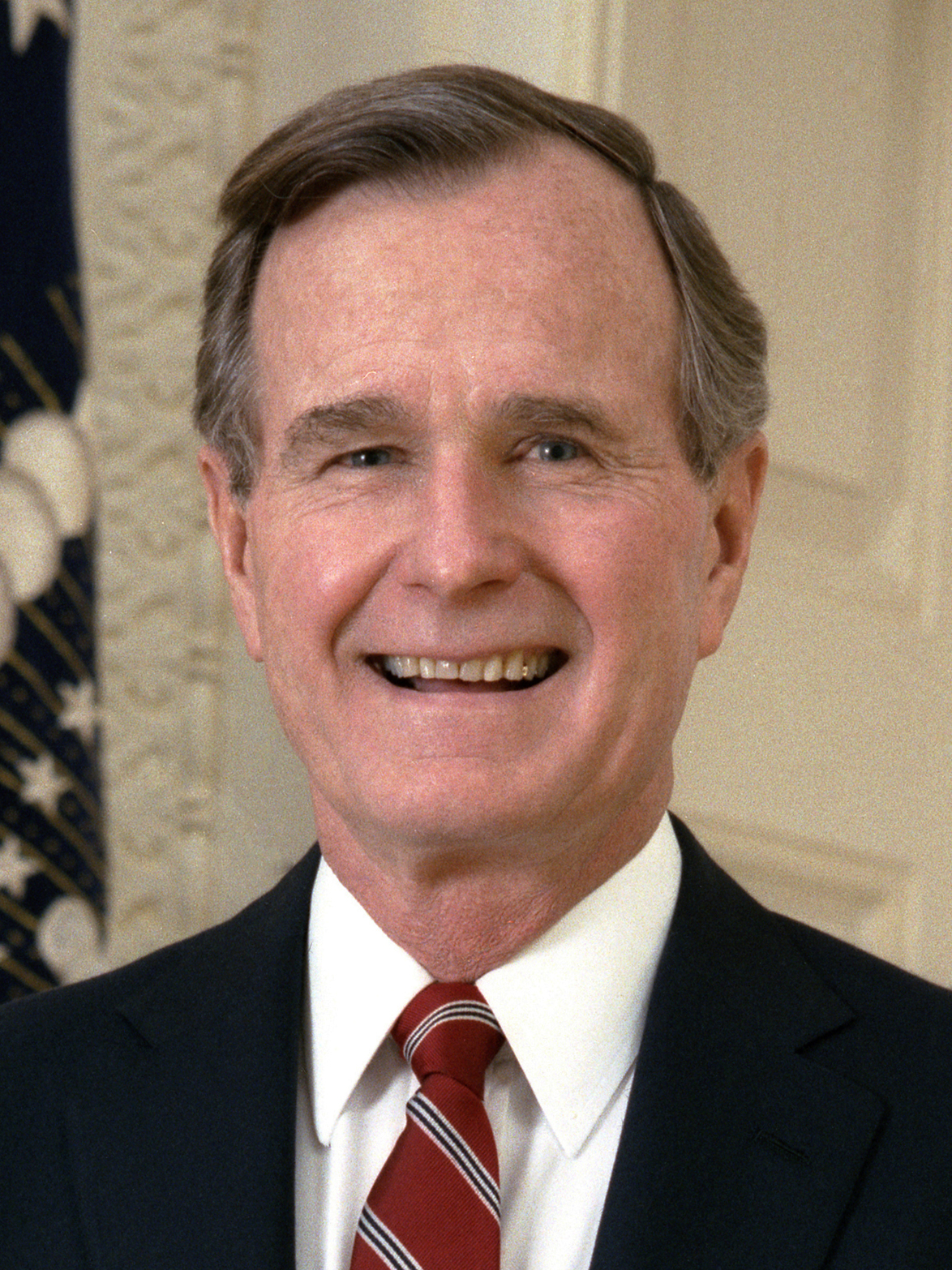

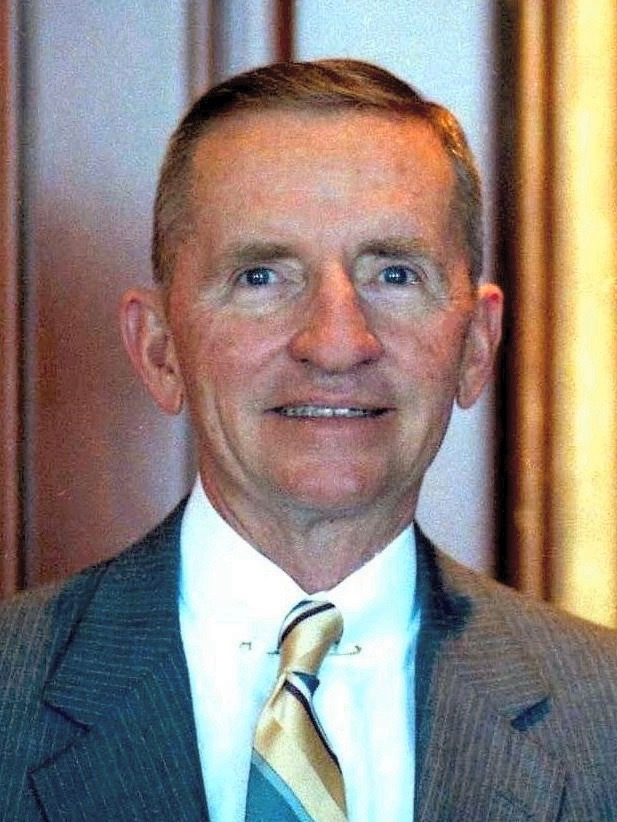
| Nominee | George H. W. Bush | Bill Clinton | Ross Perot |
| Party | Republican | Democratic | Independent |
| Home state | Texas | Arkansas | Texas |
| Running mate | Dan Quayle | Al Gore | James Stockdale |
| Electoral vote | 9 | 0 | 0 |
| Popular vote | 804,283 | 690,080 | 183,109 |
| Percentage | 47.65% | 40.88% | 10.85% |

Bush
40–50%
50–60%
60–70%
Clinton
40–50%
50–60%
60–70%
70–80%
80–90%
President before election
George H. W. Bush
Republican
Elected President
Bill Clinton
Democratic

The 1992 United States presidential election in Alabama took place on November 3, 1992, as part of the 1992 United States presidential election. Voters chose nine representatives, or electors to the Electoral College, who voted for president and vice president.

Alabama was won by President George H. W. Bush (R-TX). The presidential contest in Alabama was not a surprise, with Bush winning 47.65% to 40.88% over Arkansas Governor Bill Clinton (D), a margin of 6.77%. Despite the fact that Clinton was a Southern Democrat, Alabama remained a reliably Republican state. The last Democrat to carry Alabama was Jimmy Carter in 1976, who was also a Southern Democrat. Billionaire businessman Ross Perot (I-TX) finished in third, with a disappointing 10.85%.

== Primary ==
The Alabama primary was regarded as unimportant as Bill Clinton and George H. W. Bush had already won their party's nominations by the time it was held.

== General election ==
Black Belt Macon County saw Perot receive his smallest vote share in the nation, and that same county also gave Bush his smallest vote share of any county. By contrast, white suburban Shelby County saw Bush receive 67.97% of the vote, a Republican share exceeded in this three-way election only by the famous past and present bastions of Jackson County, Kentucky, Sioux County, Iowa, and the Texas Panhandle counties of Hansford and Ochiltree.

As of the 2024 presidential election, this is the last time a Democratic candidate won Lauderdale County, and the last time a Republican won Montgomery County.

Bush's 47.65% of the popular vote was his third-highest vote share in the nation, after Mississippi and South Carolina. Incumbent Democratic U.S. Senator Richard Shelby won reelection in the concurrent U.S. Senate election.

=== Predictions ===
| Source | Rating | As of |
|---|---|---|
| The Cook Political Report | Toss Up | October 28, 1992 |

=== Results ===
1992 United States presidential election in Alabama
| Party | Candidate | Votes | Percentage | Electoral votes |
|---|---|---|---|---|
| Republican | George H. W. Bush (incumbent) | 804,283 | 47.65% | 9 |
| Democratic | Bill Clinton | 690,080 | 40.88% | 0 |
| Independent | Ross Perot | 183,109 | 10.85% | 0 |
| Libertarian | Andre Marrou | 5,737 | 0.34% | 0 |
| New Alliance Party | Lenora Fulani | 2,161 | 0.13% | 0 |
| Socialist Workers Party | James Warren | 831 | 0.05% | 0 |
| Write-Ins | | 723 | 0.04% | 0 |
| Democrats for Economic Recovery | Lyndon LaRouche | 641 | 0.04% | 0 |
| Natural Law | John Hagelin | 495 | 0.03% | 0 |
| Totals | | 1,688,060 | 100.0% | 9 |
| Voter turnout | | 54.52% | | — |

=== Results by county ===
| County | George H.W. Bush Republican | | Bill Clinton Democratic | | Ross Perot Independent | | Various candidates Other parties | | Margin | | Total votes cast |
| County | # | % | # | % | # | % | # | % | # | % | Total votes cast |
|---|---|---|---|---|---|---|---|---|---|---|---|
| Autauga | 8,715 | 55.92% | 4,819 | 30.92% | 1,916 | 12.29% | 135 | 0.87% | 3,896 | 25.00% | 15,585 |
| Baldwin | 26,270 | 56.52% | 12,195 | 26.24% | 7,656 | 16.47% | 355 | 0.76% | 14,075 | 30.28% | 46,476 |
| Barbour | 4,475 | 42.90% | 4,836 | 46.36% | 1,020 | 9.78% | 100 | 0.96% | -361 | -3.46% | 10,431 |
| Bibb | 3,124 | 46.49% | 2,900 | 43.15% | 686 | 10.21% | 10 | 0.15% | 224 | 3.34% | 6,720 |
| Blount | 8,882 | 53.81% | 5,433 | 32.92% | 1,949 | 11.81% | 241 | 1.46% | 3,449 | 20.89% | 16,505 |
| Bullock | 1,253 | 26.02% | 3,259 | 67.67% | 266 | 5.52% | 38 | 0.79% | -2,006 | -41.65% | 4,816 |
| Butler | 3,494 | 41.21% | 4,021 | 47.43% | 867 | 10.23% | 96 | 1.13% | -527 | -6.22% | 8,478 |
| Calhoun | 20,623 | 48.18% | 16,453 | 38.44% | 4,717 | 11.02% | 1,007 | 2.35% | 4,170 | 9.74% | 42,800 |
| Chambers | 5,682 | 43.40% | 5,938 | 45.36% | 1,427 | 10.90% | 44 | 0.34% | -256 | -1.96% | 13,091 |
| Cherokee | 2,745 | 34.85% | 4,222 | 53.61% | 846 | 10.74% | 63 | 0.80% | -1,477 | -18.76% | 7,876 |
| Chilton | 8,126 | 56.17% | 4,946 | 34.19% | 1,363 | 9.42% | 33 | 0.23% | 3,180 | 21.98% | 14,468 |
| Choctaw | 3,069 | 40.60% | 3,941 | 52.13% | 489 | 6.47% | 61 | 0.81% | -872 | -11.53% | 7,560 |
| Clarke | 5,495 | 46.90% | 5,023 | 42.87% | 872 | 7.44% | 327 | 2.79% | 472 | 4.03% | 11,717 |
| Clay | 2,859 | 49.68% | 2,073 | 36.02% | 652 | 11.33% | 171 | 2.97% | 786 | 13.66% | 5,755 |
| Cleburne | 2,425 | 46.31% | 2,144 | 40.94% | 630 | 12.03% | 38 | 0.73% | 281 | 5.37% | 5,237 |
| Coffee | 7,591 | 48.87% | 5,776 | 37.19% | 2,021 | 13.01% | 145 | 0.93% | 1,815 | 11.68% | 15,533 |
| Colbert | 8,073 | 35.98% | 12,206 | 54.40% | 2,098 | 9.35% | 62 | 0.28% | -4,133 | -18.42% | 22,439 |
| Conecuh | 2,463 | 39.05% | 3,155 | 50.02% | 552 | 8.75% | 137 | 2.17% | -692 | -10.97% | 6,307 |
| Coosa | 1,973 | 41.12% | 2,330 | 48.56% | 476 | 9.92% | 19 | 0.40% | -357 | -7.44% | 4,798 |
| Covington | 6,840 | 48.99% | 5,004 | 35.84% | 1,880 | 13.47% | 238 | 1.70% | 1,836 | 13.15% | 13,962 |
| Crenshaw | 2,339 | 44.22% | 2,404 | 45.44% | 485 | 9.17% | 62 | 1.17% | -65 | -1.22% | 5,290 |
| Cullman | 14,411 | 49.62% | 10,451 | 35.98% | 4,113 | 14.16% | 68 | 0.23% | 3,960 | 13.64% | 29,043 |
| Dale | 8,123 | 51.45% | 5,098 | 32.29% | 2,423 | 15.35% | 143 | 0.91% | 3,025 | 19.16% | 15,787 |
| Dallas | 7,394 | 37.72% | 11,053 | 56.38% | 1,110 | 5.66% | 47 | 0.24% | -3,659 | -18.66% | 19,604 |
| DeKalb | 10,519 | 48.73% | 8,245 | 38.20% | 2,741 | 12.70% | 80 | 0.37% | 2,274 | 10.53% | 21,585 |
| Elmore | 11,356 | 55.70% | 6,223 | 30.52% | 2,765 | 13.56% | 44 | 0.22% | 5,133 | 25.18% | 20,388 |
| Escambia | 5,955 | 46.44% | 4,809 | 37.50% | 1,616 | 12.60% | 444 | 3.46% | 1,146 | 8.94% | 12,824 |
| Etowah | 17,467 | 41.15% | 20,558 | 48.43% | 4,277 | 10.08% | 149 | 0.35% | -3,091 | -7.28% | 42,451 |
| Fayette | 3,604 | 42.55% | 3,830 | 45.22% | 1,012 | 11.95% | 24 | 0.28% | -226 | -2.67% | 8,470 |
| Franklin | 4,794 | 40.43% | 5,953 | 50.20% | 1,075 | 9.07% | 36 | 0.30% | -1,159 | -9.77% | 11,858 |
| Geneva | 4,843 | 49.08% | 3,622 | 36.71% | 1,323 | 13.41% | 79 | 0.80% | 1,221 | 12.37% | 9,867 |
| Greene | 805 | 16.49% | 3,865 | 79.18% | 194 | 3.97% | 17 | 0.35% | -3,060 | -62.69% | 4,881 |
| Hale | 2,001 | 33.22% | 3,481 | 57.80% | 486 | 8.07% | 55 | 0.91% | -1,480 | -24.58% | 6,023 |
| Henry | 2,970 | 45.70% | 2,804 | 43.15% | 667 | 10.26% | 58 | 0.89% | 166 | 2.55% | 6,499 |
| Houston | 17,360 | 58.33% | 8,857 | 29.76% | 3,492 | 11.73% | 51 | 0.17% | 8,503 | 28.57% | 29,760 |
| Jackson | 5,711 | 30.19% | 10,628 | 56.19% | 2,462 | 13.02% | 115 | 0.61% | -4,917 | -26.00% | 18,916 |
| Jefferson | 149,832 | 50.13% | 125,889 | 42.12% | 22,191 | 7.42% | 972 | 0.33% | 23,943 | 8.01% | 298,884 |
| Lamar | 3,262 | 47.29% | 2,849 | 41.30% | 763 | 11.06% | 24 | 0.35% | 413 | 5.99% | 6,898 |
| Lauderdale | 13,728 | 40.67% | 15,936 | 47.21% | 4,009 | 11.88% | 83 | 0.25% | -2,208 | -6.54% | 33,756 |
| Lawrence | 3,576 | 30.86% | 6,364 | 54.91% | 1,624 | 14.01% | 25 | 0.22% | -2,788 | -24.05% | 11,589 |
| Lee | 16,885 | 47.58% | 13,770 | 38.80% | 4,572 | 12.88% | 263 | 0.74% | 3,115 | 8.78% | 35,490 |
| Limestone | 9,862 | 45.66% | 8,087 | 37.45% | 3,584 | 16.59% | 64 | 0.30% | 1,775 | 8.21% | 21,597 |
| Lowndes | 1,328 | 25.80% | 3,500 | 67.99% | 284 | 5.52% | 36 | 0.70% | -2,172 | -42.19% | 5,148 |
| Macon | 1,134 | 12.94% | 7,253 | 82.78% | 283 | 3.23% | 92 | 1.05% | -6,119 | -69.84% | 8,762 |
| Madison | 51,444 | 47.71% | 38,974 | 36.14% | 16,989 | 15.75% | 427 | 0.40% | 12,470 | 11.57% | 107,834 |
| Marengo | 4,470 | 39.75% | 5,632 | 50.09% | 919 | 8.17% | 223 | 1.98% | -1,162 | -10.34% | 11,244 |
| Marion | 5,692 | 42.89% | 6,167 | 46.47% | 1,389 | 10.47% | 22 | 0.17% | -475 | -3.58% | 13,270 |
| Marshall | 12,249 | 45.85% | 10,421 | 39.01% | 3,795 | 14.20% | 252 | 0.94% | 1,828 | 6.84% | 26,717 |
| Mobile | 72,935 | 50.72% | 54,962 | 38.22% | 15,105 | 10.51% | 786 | 0.55% | 17,973 | 12.50% | 143,788 |
| Monroe | 4,919 | 50.48% | 3,872 | 39.73% | 759 | 7.79% | 195 | 2.00% | 1,047 | 10.75% | 9,745 |
| Montgomery | 40,742 | 47.29% | 37,342 | 43.34% | 7,647 | 8.88% | 421 | 0.49% | 3,400 | 3.95% | 86,152 |
| Morgan | 21,073 | 47.92% | 15,091 | 34.31% | 7,683 | 17.47% | 131 | 0.30% | 5,982 | 13.61% | 43,978 |
| Perry | 1,829 | 31.46% | 3,712 | 63.86% | 213 | 3.66% | 59 | 1.01% | -1,883 | -32.40% | 5,813 |
| Pickens | 3,634 | 44.63% | 3,783 | 46.46% | 690 | 8.47% | 35 | 0.43% | -149 | -1.83% | 8,142 |
| Pike | 5,423 | 48.45% | 4,688 | 41.88% | 1,024 | 9.15% | 58 | 0.52% | 735 | 6.57% | 11,193 |
| Randolph | 3,813 | 46.77% | 3,318 | 40.70% | 919 | 11.27% | 102 | 1.25% | 495 | 6.07% | 8,152 |
| Russell | 5,587 | 35.61% | 8,647 | 55.12% | 1,360 | 8.67% | 95 | 0.61% | -3,060 | -19.51% | 15,689 |
| St. Clair | 12,447 | 57.56% | 6,517 | 30.14% | 2,614 | 12.09% | 46 | 0.21% | 5,930 | 27.42% | 21,624 |
| Shelby | 32,736 | 67.97% | 10,317 | 21.42% | 5,022 | 10.43% | 90 | 0.19% | 22,419 | 46.55% | 48,165 |
| Sumter | 1,807 | 25.72% | 4,810 | 68.47% | 388 | 5.52% | 20 | 0.28% | -3,003 | -42.75% | 7,025 |
| Talladega | 12,661 | 48.21% | 10,695 | 40.72% | 2,629 | 10.01% | 279 | 1.06% | 1,966 | 7.49% | 26,264 |
| Tallapoosa | 8,140 | 52.67% | 5,703 | 36.90% | 1,562 | 10.11% | 51 | 0.33% | 2,437 | 15.77% | 15,456 |
| Tuscaloosa | 27,454 | 47.27% | 23,495 | 40.46% | 7,011 | 12.07% | 113 | 0.19% | 3,959 | 6.81% | 58,073 |
| Walker | 11,301 | 38.26% | 14,831 | 50.22% | 3,344 | 11.32% | 58 | 0.20% | -3,530 | -11.96% | 29,534 |
| Washington | 3,270 | 40.06% | 4,046 | 49.57% | 829 | 10.16% | 17 | 0.21% | -776 | -9.51% | 8,162 |
| Wilcox | 1,671 | 31.50% | 3,439 | 64.84% | 174 | 3.28% | 20 | 0.38% | -1,768 | -33.34% | 5,304 |
| Winston | 5,550 | 55.01% | 3,415 | 33.85% | 1,110 | 11.00% | 14 | 0.14% | 2,135 | 21.16% | 10,089 |
| Totals | 804,283 | 47.65% | 690,080 | 40.88% | 183,109 | 10.85% | 10,588 | 0.63% | 114,203 | 6.77% | 1,688,060 |

==== Counties that flipped from Republican to Democratic ====
- Barbour
- Butler
- Chambers
- Choctaw
- Conecuh
- Coosa
- Crenshaw
- Etowah
- Fayette
- Franklin
- Lauderdale
- Marion
- Pickens
- Washington

=== By congressional district ===
Bush won six of seven congressional districts, including three held by a Democrat.

| District | Bush | Clinton | Representative |
|---|---|---|---|
| 1st | 52% | 37% | Sonny Callahan |
| 2nd | 53% | 35% | Terry Everett |
| 3rd | 48% | 42% | Glen Browder |
| 4th | 45% | 44% | Tom Bevill |
| 5th | 44% | 41% | Bud Cramer |
| 6th | 64% | 27% | Spencer Bachus |
| 7th | 27% | 67% | Earl Hilliard |

== See also ==
- United States presidential elections in Alabama

== Works cited ==
- Steed, Robert; Moreland, Laurence; Baker, Tod, eds. (1994). The 1992 Presidential Election in the South: Current Patterns of Southern Party and Electoral Politics. Praeger Publishers. ISBN 0275945340.
