= NOAAS Pisces =

Oceanographic research vessel

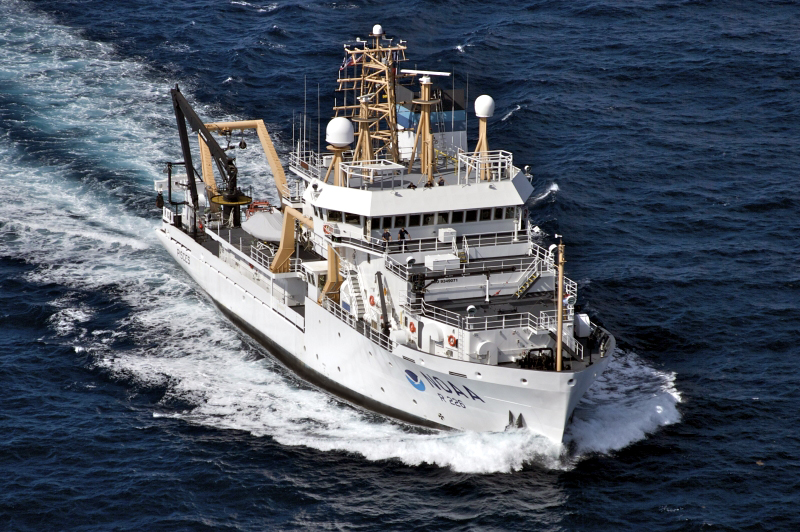
- An aerial view of NOAAS Pisces (R 226).

History

United States
- Name: NOAAS Pisces (R 226)
- Namesake: Winning name in NOAA regional naming contest
- Operator: National Oceanic and Atmospheric Administration
- Builder: VT Halter Marine, Moss Point, Mississippi
- Launched: 19 December 2007
- Sponsored by: Annette Nevin Shelby
- Commissioned: 6 November 2009
- Home port: Pascagoula, Mississippi
- Identification: IMO number: 9349071; MMSI number: 369970145; Call sign: WTDL
- Status: Active

General characteristics
- Class & type: Oscar Dyson-class Fisheries research ship
- Displacement: 1,840 metric tons (light ship); 2,479 metric tons (full load)
- Length: 209 ft (64 m)
- Beam: 49.2 ft (15.0 m)
- Draft: 19.4 ft (5.9 m) (with centerboard up); 29.7 ft (9.1 m) (with centerboard down)
- Depth: 28.4 ft (8.7 m)
- Propulsion: One 2.25 mW (3,017-shp) integrated diesel-electric, 24-pulse DC SCR drive system with two 1,150-kW (1,542-hp) propulsion motors on a common shaft, two 1,360-kW diesel generators, and two 910-kW diesel generators; one fixed-pitch propeller; one 720-kW (966-hp) AC induction azimuthing bow thruster
- Speed: 16.0 knots (30 km/h) (maximum); 14.5 knots (27 km/h) (cruising)
- Range: 12,000 nautical miles (22,000 km)
- Endurance: 40 days
- Complement: 21 (6 NOAA Corps officers, 4 licensed engineers, and 11 other crew members), plus up to 17 scientists

NOAAS Pisces (R 226) is an American fisheries and oceanographic research vessel in commission in the National Oceanic and Atmospheric Administration (NOAA) fleet since 2009.

== Construction and commissioning ==
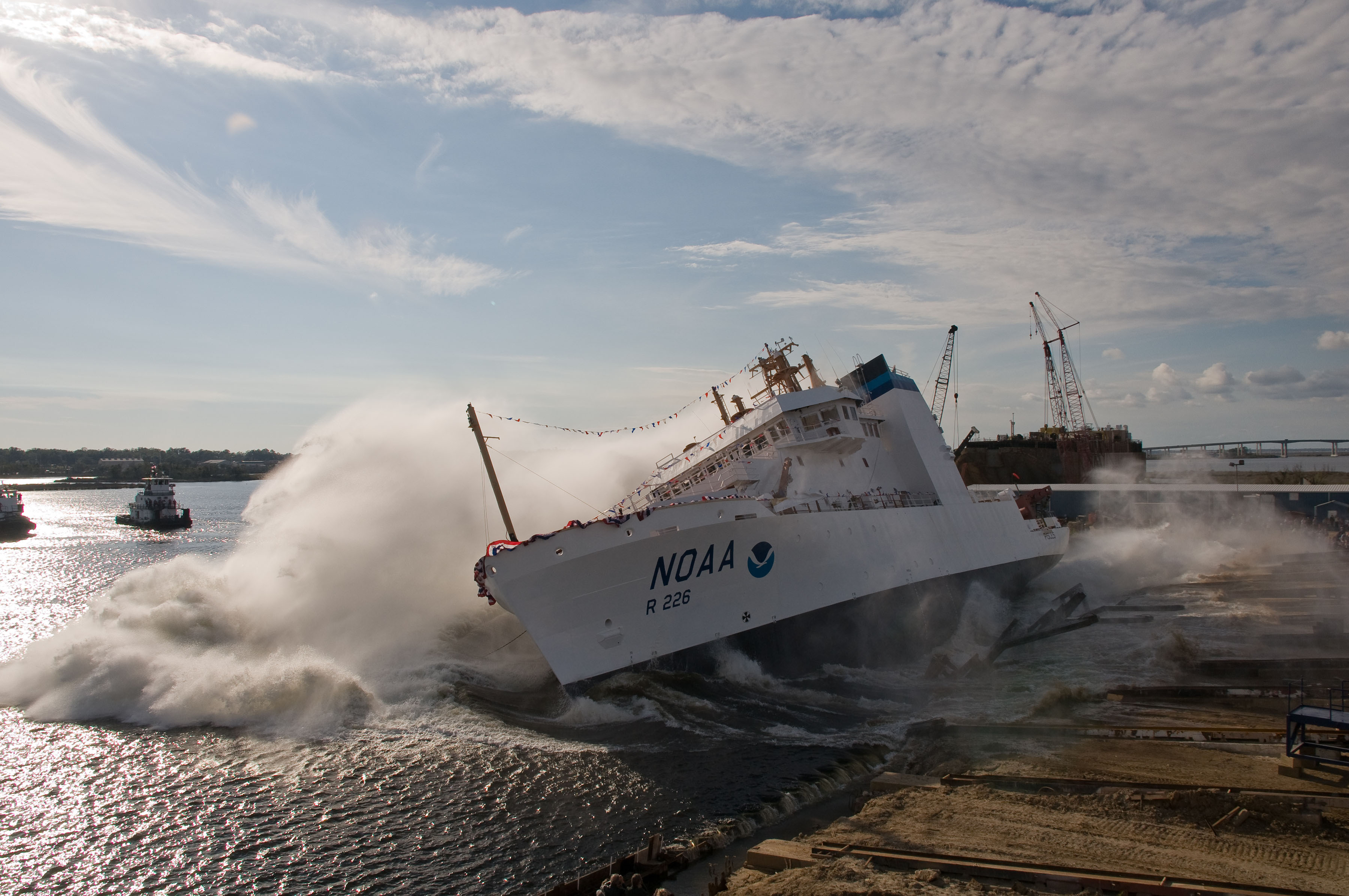
NOAAS Pisces (R 226) is launched by VT Halter Marine at Moss Point, Mississippi, on 19 December 2007.

Pisces was built by VT Halter Marine at Moss Point, Mississippi, and was launched on 19 December 2007, sponsored by Annette Nevin Shelby, the wife of United States Senator Richard Shelby of Alabama. The ship was commissioned into service as NOAAS Pisces (R 226) on 6 November 2009.

To name the ship and promote interest in science, NOAA held a regional contest requiring submission of a proposed name and an accompanying essay supporting the choice of name. The winning entry, submitted by five seventh graders at Sacred Heart Elementary School in Southaven, Mississippi, was Pisces.

== Characteristics and capabilities ==
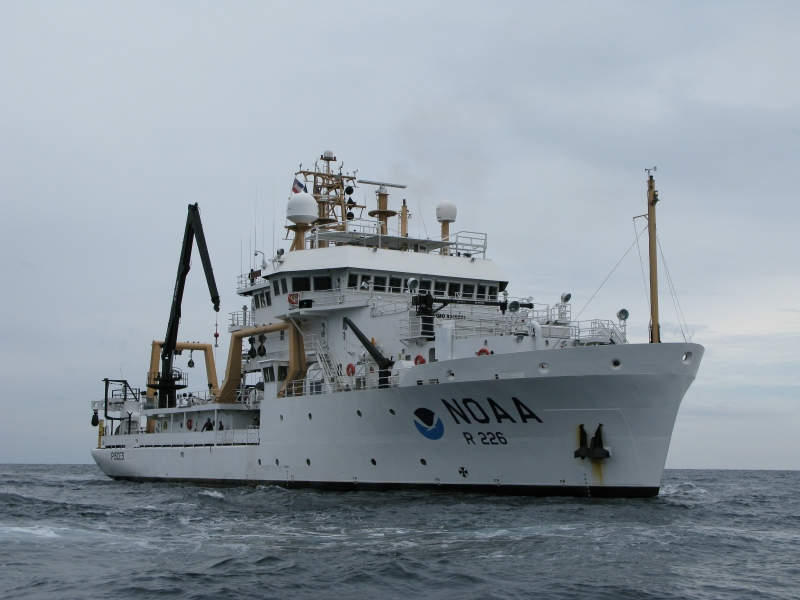
NOAAS Pisces (R 226) seen from her rescue boat.

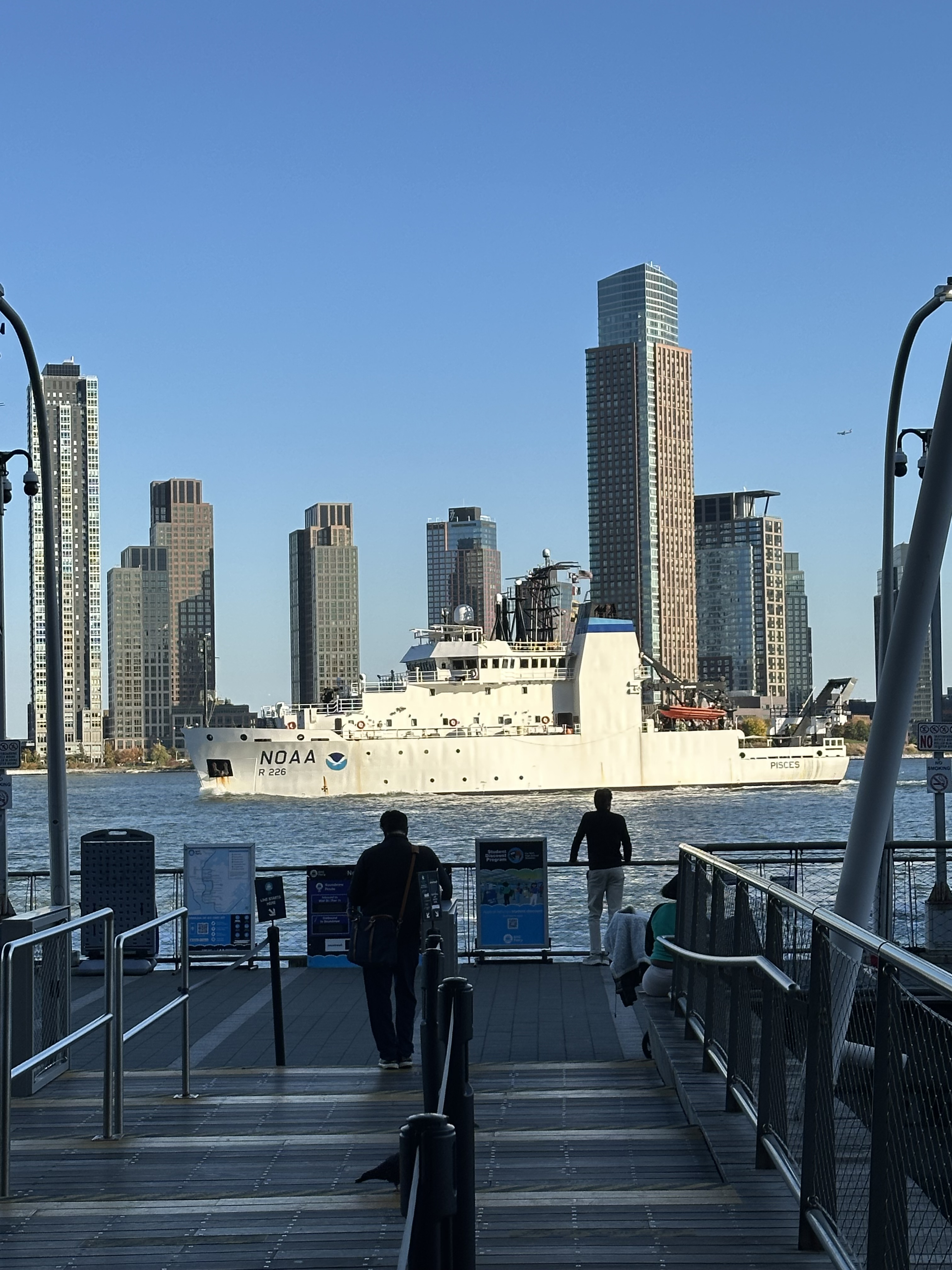
Pisces transiting northward on the East River in New York, 2024

Capable of conducting multidisciplinary oceanographic operations in support of biological, chemical, and physical process studies, Pisces was commissioned as the third of a class of five of the most advanced fisheries research vessels in the world, with a unique capability to conduct both fishing and oceanographic research. She is a stern trawler with fishing capabilities similar to those of commercial fishing vessels. She is rigged for longlining and trap fishing and can conduct trawling operations to depths of 6,000 feet (1,800 meters). Her most advanced feature is the incorporation of United States Navy-type acoustic quieting technology to enable NOAA scientists to monitor fish populations without the ship's noise altering the behavior of the fish, including advanced quieting features incorporated into her machinery, equipment, and propeller. Her oceanographic hydrophones are mounted on a retractable centerboard, or drop keel, that lowers scientific transducers away from the region of hull-generated flow noise, enhancing the quality of the data collected. To take full advantage of these advanced data-gathering capabilities, she has the Scientific Sonar System, which can accurately measure the biomass of fish in a survey area. She also has an Acoustic Doppler Current Profiler with which to collect data on ocean currents and a multibeam sonar system that provides information on the content of the water column and on the type and topography of the seafloor while she is underway, and she can gather hydrographic data at any speed up to 11 knots (20 km/h).

Pisces has a traction-type oceanographic winch which can deploy up to 5,000 meters (16,000 feet) of 17 mm (0.67 in) wire rope, electromechanical cable, or fiberoptic cable. She also has two hydrographic winches, each of which can deploy 3,500 meters (11,500 feet) of 9.5 mm (0.37 in) electromechanical cable, two trawl winches, each of which has a 35-metric-ton pull and can deploy 4,000 meters (13,000 feet) of 28.5 mm (1.12 in) warp wire, and a Gilson winch. She has a telescopic boom and an articulated boom, each with a lifting capacity of 8,000 lb (3,600 kg). She has an A-frame on her starboard side and a large A-frame aft. The oceanographic winch and large after A-frame work in conjunction to serve her stern sampling station, while the two hydrographic winches work with the side A-frame to service her side sampling station, and the two hydrographic winches together give Pisces the capability to have three scientific packages ready for sequential operations. One of her hydrographic winches also can deploy lines and equipment over her stern. In addition to trawling, her sampling stations can deploy smaller sampling nets, longlines, and fish traps, and she has modified outriggers for shrimp trawling and gear testing. The hydrographic winches can deploy CTD instruments to measure the electrical conductivity, temperature, and chlorophyll fluorescence of sea water. Pisces also can deploy specialized gear such as Multiple Opening/Closing Net and Environmental Sensing System (MOCNESS) frames, towed vehicles, dredges, and bottom corers, and she can deploy and recover both floating and bottom-moored sensor arrays. While trawling, Pisces uses wireless and hard-wired systems to monitor the shape of the trawl net and to work in conjunction with an autotrawl system that sets trawl depth and trawl wire tension and adjusts the net configuration.

Pisces has a 56 m^{2} (600 sq ft) wet laboratory, a 15 m^{2} (160 sq ft) dry laboratory, a 27 m^{2} (290 sq ft) chemistry laboratory, and a 46 m^{2} (500 sq ft) acoustic and computer laboratory. She also has a 19 m^{2} (200 sq ft) walk-in scientific freezer, a 9 m^{2} (97 sq ft) controlled environment room, and a 5 m^{2} (54 sq ft) preservation alcove. She has 145 m^{2} (1,560 sq ft) of open deck space aft for fishing and scientific operations and another 33 m^{2} (360 sq ft) of open deck space at the side sampling station on her starboard side. All of her discharge pipes empty off her port side so that fluids discharged will not contaminate samples collected at the station on her starboard side.

In addition to her crew of 21, Pisces can accommodate up to 17 scientists.

== Service history ==
Operated by NOAA's Office of Marine and Aviation Operations and with Pascagoula, Mississippi, as her home port, Pisces collects, monitors, and studies data on a wide range of sea life and ocean conditions, primarily in the waters of the United States exclusive economic zone in the Gulf of Mexico, Caribbean Sea, and Atlantic Ocean as far north as North Carolina. The ship collects data that scientists use to study variations in ocean conditions and sea life – including shrimp and other marine invertebrates, reef fish, and groundfish – to better understand the sustainability of fisheries, the structure and function of ecosystems, fish habitats and habitat restoration, coral reefs, and the status of protected species. She also makes weather and sea state observations, reports on other environmental conditions, conducts habitat assessments, and surveys marine mammal and seabird populations.

During the latter half of 2010, Pisces conducted several cruises in the Gulf of Mexico to assess the effect of the BP Deepwater Horizon oil spill on marine life there and to monitor the water column in the vicinity of the Deepwater Horizon wellhead during post-spill wellhead testing.

== See also ==
- NOAA ships and aircraft
