= Republican Revolution =

Series of wins by the Republican Party in the 1994 United States mid-term elections

- November 8, 1994 – January 3, 2007
Reagan Revolution	George W. Bush presidency
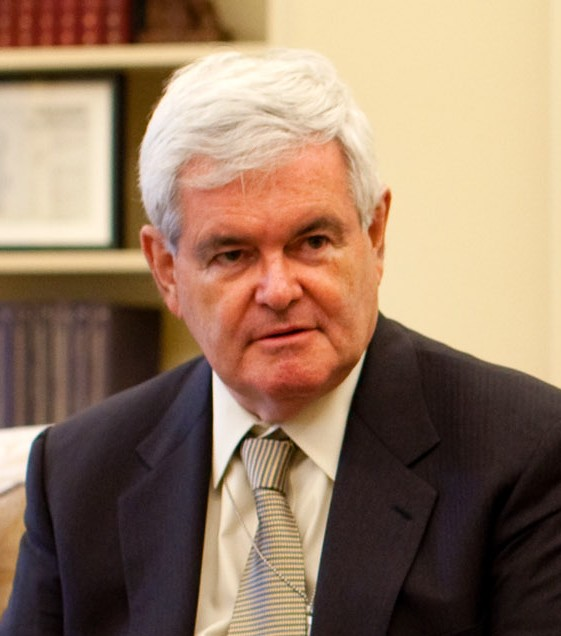
- Newt Gingrich signing the Contract with America on September 27, 1994
- Leaders: Newt Gingrich; Dick Armey; Tom DeLay
- Key events: 1995–1996 government shutdowns; Welfare reform legislation (1996); Impeachment of Bill Clinton (1998)

The Republican Revolution, also known as the Revolution of '94 or Gingrich Revolution, are political slogans that refer to the Republican Party's (GOP) success in the 1994 U.S. midterm elections, which resulted in a net gain of 54 seats in the House of Representatives, and a pick-up of eight seats in the Senate. Led by House minority whip Newt Gingrich, this was the first time the GOP had taken control of the House since 1952.

== History ==
Rather than campaigning independently in each district, Republican candidates chose to rally behind a single national program and message fronted by Georgia congressman and House Republican whip Newt Gingrich. They alleged that President Bill Clinton was not the "New Democrat" he claimed to be during his 1992 campaign, but was a "tax and spend" liberal. The Republicans offered an alternative to Clinton's policies in the form of the Contract with America.

The gains in seats in the mid-term election resulted in the Republicans gaining control of both the House and the Senate in January 1995. Republicans had not held the majority in the House for 40 years, since the 83rd Congress (elected in 1952). From 1933 to 1995, Republicans had controlled both House and Senate for only four years. From 1933 into the early 1970s, most white conservatives in the South belonged to the Democratic Party, and created the Solid South bloc in Congress. Most African Americans in the South were disenfranchised in those years, based on anti-Black laws and subjective administration of voter registration practices.

By the mid-1990s, white conservatives from the South joined Republicans in other parts of the country, leading to the change in Congress. Large Republican gains were made in state houses as well when the GOP picked up twelve gubernatorial seats and 472 legislative seats. In so doing, it took control of 20 state legislatures from the Democrats. Prior to this, Republicans had not held the majority of governorships since 1970. In addition, this was the first time in 50 years that the GOP controlled a majority of state legislatures.

Discontent with Democratic candidates was foreshadowed by a string of elections after 1992, including Republicans winning the mayoralties of New York and Los Angeles in 1993. In that same year, Christine Todd Whitman won the New Jersey governorship. Bret Schundler became the first Republican mayor of Jersey City, New Jersey, which had been held by the Democratic Party since 1917.

Republican George Allen won the 1993 Virginia gubernatorial election, and Texas Republican Kay Bailey Hutchison won a U.S. Senate seat from the Democrats in the 1993 special election. Republicans also picked up three congressional seats from Democrats in Oklahoma and Kentucky in May 1994.

On November 9, 1994, the day after the election, Senator Richard Shelby of Alabama, a conservative Democrat, changed parties, becoming a Republican; on March 3, 1995, Colorado Senator Ben Nighthorse Campbell switched to the Republican side as well, increasing the GOP Senate majority.

== Effect ==
When the 104th United States Congress convened in January 1995, House Republicans voted former Minority Whip Newt Gingrich—the chief author of the Contract with America—to become Speaker of the House. The new senatorial Republican majority chose Bob Dole, previously Minority Leader, as Majority Leader. Republicans pursued an ambitious agenda, but were often forced to compromise with Democratic president Bill Clinton, who wielded veto power.

The 1994 election also marked the end of the conservative coalition, a bi-partisan coalition of conservative Republicans and Democrats (often referred to as "boll weevil Democrats", for their association with the South). This white conservative coalition had often managed to control Congressional outcomes since the end of the New Deal era.

== Pick-ups ==
Numerous Republican freshmen entered Congress. Of the 230 Republican House members of the 104th Congress, almost a third were new to the House. In the Senate, 11 of 54 (20%) Republicans were freshmen.

=== Senate ===
Name	State	Predecessor	Predecessor's fate
Richard Shelby	Alabama	Himself as a Democrat	Switched parties (Note: Shelby had been elected in 1986 and 1992 as a Democrat, but switched parties in 1994.)
Jon Kyl	Arizona	Dennis DeConcini	Retired
Ben Nighthorse Campbell	Colorado	Himself as a Democrat	Switched parties (Note: Campbell was elected in 1992 as a Democrat, but switched parties on March 3, 1995.)
Olympia Snowe	Maine	George Mitchell	Retired
Spencer Abraham	Michigan	Donald Riegle	Retired
Mike DeWine	Ohio	Howard Metzenbaum	Retired
Jim Inhofe	Oklahoma	David Boren	Retired (Note: Boren's impending resignation to assume the presidency of the University of Oklahoma triggered a special election where Inhofe won. Boren resigned a week after the special election, with Inhofe being sworn in 2 days later for the remainder of Boren's term ending in 1997.)
Rick Santorum	Pennsylvania	Harris Wofford	Defeated
Fred Thompson	Tennessee	Harlan Mathews	Retired (Note: Mathews was appointed to the seat as a caretaker following the resignation of Vice President Al Gore; Thompson was elected to serve the remaining two years of the term.)
Bill Frist	Tennessee	Jim Sasser	Defeated
Kay Bailey Hutchison	Texas	Bob Krueger	Defeated (Note: Hutchison won the Senate seat from the Democrats in the 1993 special election to succeed Bob Krueger, who had been appointed to this seat following the resignation of Lloyd Bentsen, who had become the Secretary of the Treasury, seen as a precursor to the Republican Revolution.)

=== House of Representatives ===
Name	District	Predecessor	Predecessor's fate
Matt Salmon	Arizona-1	Sam Coppersmith	Retired; ran for U.S Senate
J. D. Hayworth	Arizona-6	Karan English	Defeated
Frank Riggs	California-1	Dan Hamburg	Defeated
George Radanovich	California-19	Richard Lehman	Defeated
Brian Bilbray	California-49	Lynn Schenk	Defeated
Joe Scarborough	Florida-1	Earl Hutto	Retired
Dave Weldon	Florida-15	Jim Bacchus	Retired
Bob Barr	Georgia-7	Buddy Darden	Defeated
Saxby Chambliss	Georgia-8	J. Roy Rowland	Retired
Charlie Norwood	Georgia-10	Don Johnson Jr.	Defeated
Helen Chenoweth	Idaho-1	Larry LaRocco	Defeated
Michael Flanagan	Illinois-5	Dan Rostenkowski	Defeated
Jerry Weller	Illinois-11	George Sangmeister	Retired
David McIntosh	Indiana-2	Phil Sharp	Retired
Mark Souder	Indiana-4	Jill Long Thompson	Defeated
John Hostettler	Indiana-8	Frank McCloskey	Defeated
Greg Ganske	Iowa-4	Neal Smith	Defeated
Sam Brownback	Kansas-2	Jim Slattery	Retired; ran for Governor
Todd Tiahrt	Kansas-4	Dan Glickman	Defeated
Ed Whitfield	Kentucky-1	Tom Barlow	Defeated
Jim Longley	Maine-1	Tom Andrews	Retired; ran for U.S Senate
Bob Ehrlich	Maryland-2	Helen Bentley	Retired; ran for Governor
Dick Chrysler	Michigan-8	Bob Carr	Retired; ran for U.S Senate
Gil Gutknecht	Minnesota-1	Tim Penny	Retired
Roger Wicker	Mississippi-1	Jamie Whitten	Retired
Jon Christensen	Nebraska-2	Peter Hoagland	Defeated
John Ensign	Nevada-1	James Bilbray	Defeated
Charlie Bass	New Hampshire-2	Dick Swett	Defeated
Frank LoBiondo	New Jersey-2	Bill Hughes	Retired
Bill Martini	New Jersey-8	Herb Klein	Defeated
Michael Forbes	New York-1	George Hochbrueckner	Defeated
David Funderburk	North Carolina-2	Tim Valentine	Retired
Walter Jones	North Carolina-3	Martin Lancaster	Defeated
Fred Heineman	North Carolina-4	David Price	Defeated
Richard Burr	North Carolina-5	Steve Neal	Retired
Steve Chabot	Ohio-1	David Mann	Defeated
Frank Cremeans	Ohio-6	Ted Strickland	Defeated
Bob Ney	Ohio-18	Doug Applegate	Retired
Steve LaTourette	Ohio-19	Eric Fingerhut	Defeated
Tom Coburn	Oklahoma-2	Mike Synar	Defeated (in primary)
J. C. Watts	Oklahoma-4	Dave McCurdy	Retired; ran for U.S Senate
Jim Bunn	Oregon-5	Mike Kopetski	Retired
Jon Fox	Pennsylvania-13	Marjorie Margolies-Mezvinsky	Defeated
Lindsey Graham	South Carolina-3	Butler Derrick	Retired
Zach Wamp	Tennessee-3	Marilyn Lloyd	Retired
Van Hilleary	Tennessee-4	Jim Cooper	Retired; ran for U.S Senate
Steve Stockman	Texas-9	Jack Brooks	Defeated
Mac Thornberry	Texas-13	Bill Sarpalius	Defeated
Enid Greene Waldholtz	Utah-2	Karen Shepherd	Defeated
Tom Davis	Virginia-11	Leslie Byrne	Defeated
Rick White	Washington-1	Maria Cantwell	Defeated (Note: Cantwell eventually elected as Senator in 2000.)
Jack Metcalf	Washington-2	Al Swift	Retired
Linda Smith	Washington-3	Jolene Unsoeld	Defeated
Doc Hastings	Washington-4	Jay Inslee	Defeated (Note: Inslee eventually returned to the Congress in 1999 following his victory in the 1998 House of Representatives elections.)
George Nethercutt	Washington-5	Tom Foley	Defeated
Randy Tate	Washington-9	Mike Kreidler	Defeated
Mark Neumann	Wisconsin-1	Peter Barca	Defeated

=== Governorships ===
Name	State	Predecessor	Predecessor's fate
Fob James	Alabama	Jim Folsom Jr.	Defeated
John G. Rowland	Connecticut	Lowell P. Weicker Jr. (Note: Weicker was a member of A Connecticut Party.)	Retired
Phil Batt	Idaho	Cecil D. Andrus	Retired
Bill Graves	Kansas	Joan Finney	Retired
Gary Johnson	New Mexico	Bruce King	Defeated
George Pataki	New York	Mario Cuomo	Defeated
Frank Keating	Oklahoma	David Walters	Retired
Tom Ridge	Pennsylvania	Bob Casey Sr.	Term-limited
Lincoln Almond	Rhode Island	Bruce Sundlun	Defeated (in primary)
Don Sundquist	Tennessee	Ned McWherter	Term-limited
George W. Bush	Texas	Ann Richards	Defeated
Jim Geringer	Wyoming	Mike Sullivan	Term-limited

== See also ==
- 1998 United States elections
- 2000 United States elections
- 2002 United States elections
- 2004 United States elections
- 2010 United States elections
- 2014 United States elections
- 2016 United States elections
- 2018 United States elections
- 2024 United States elections
- Federal Assault Weapons Ban
