= 2010 United States Senate election in Alabama =

- November 2, 2010
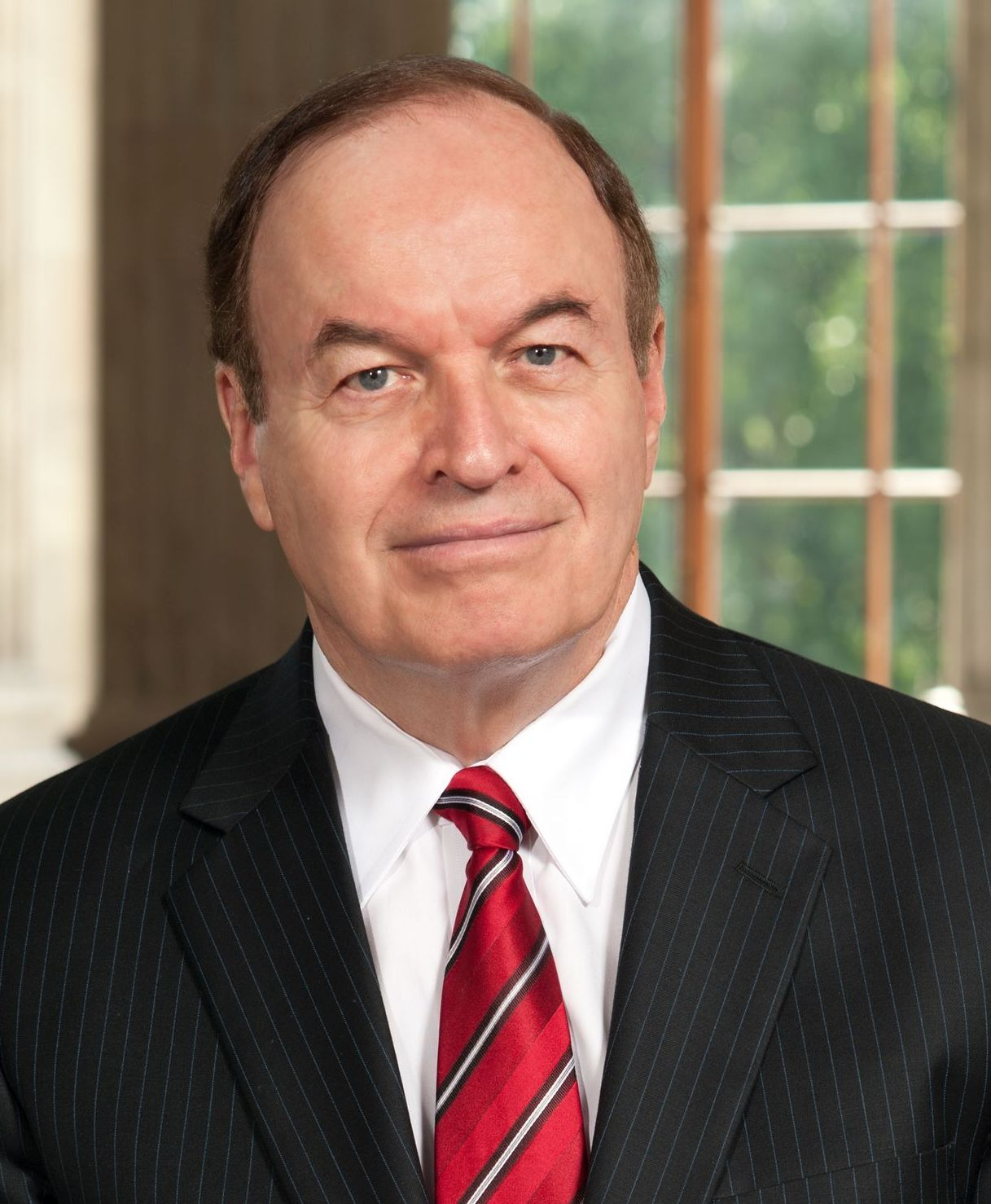

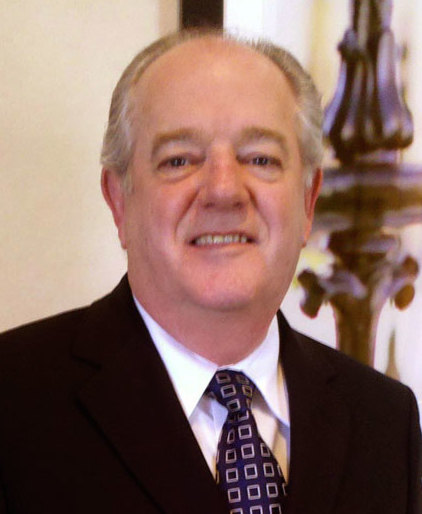
Nominee	Richard Shelby	William G. Barnes
Party	Republican	Democratic
Popular vote	968,181	515,619
Percentage	65.18%	34.71%
- County results Shelby: 50–60% 60–70% 70–80% 80–90% Barnes: 50–60% 60–70% 70–80% 80–90%
U.S. senator before election
Richard Shelby
Republican
Elected U.S. Senator
Richard Shelby
Republican

The 2010 United States Senate election in Alabama took place on November 2, 2010, alongside other elections to the United States Senate in other states, as well as elections to the United States House of Representatives and various state and local elections. Incumbent Republican Senator Richard Shelby won re-election to a fifth term.

== Background ==
In 1986, Shelby won the Democratic nomination for the Senate seat held by Republican Jeremiah Denton, the first Republican elected to the Senate from Alabama since Reconstruction. He won a very close race as the Democrats regained control of the Senate. He was easily re-elected in 1992 even as Bill Clinton lost Alabama's electoral votes.

On November 9, 1994, Shelby switched his party affiliation to Republican, one day after the Republicans won control of both houses in the midterm elections, giving the Republicans a 53–47 majority in the Senate. He won his first full term as a Republican in 1998 by a large margin, and faced no significant opposition in 2004.

Shelby was popular in Alabama. A September 2009 poll showed he had a 58% approval rating, with 35% disapproving.

== Republican primary ==
=== Candidates ===
- Clint Moser, Tea Party activist
- Richard Shelby, incumbent U.S. Senator

=== Polling ===
Poll source	Date(s) administered	Sample size	Margin of error	Richard Shelby	Clint Moser	Other	Undecided
Research 2000	May 10–12, 2010	600	± 4.0%	63%	14%	—	23%

=== Results ===
Republican primary results
Party	Candidate	Votes	%
Republican	Richard Shelby (incumbent)	405,042	84.34%
Republican	Clint Moser	75,190	15.66%
Total votes		480,232	100.00%

== Democratic primary ==
=== Candidates ===
- William G. Barnes, attorney
- Simone De Moore, teacher and soul singer

=== Polling ===
Poll source	Date(s) administered	Sample size	Margin of error	William Barnes	Simone De Moore	Other	Undecided
Research 2000	May 10–12, 2010	600	± 4.0%	39%	11%	3%	47%

=== Results ===
Results by county Barnes: 50–60%; 60–70%; 70–80%; 80–90%; De Moore: 50–60%

Democratic primary results
Party	Candidate	Votes	%
Democratic	William G. Barnes	160,737	60.77%
Democratic	Simone De Moore	103,784	39.23%
Total votes		264,521	100.00%

== General election ==
=== Candidates ===
- William G. Barnes (D), attorney
- Richard Shelby (R), incumbent U.S. Senator since 1987

=== Campaign ===
Shelby, who switched from Democrat to Republican in 1994, was a popular senator in Alabama for three decades, first elected in 1986. He has over $17 million in the bank, one of the highest of any candidate in the country. Recently, he became even more popular in his opposition to the Troubled Asset Relief Program (TARP) and the Emergency Economic Stabilization Act of 2008, as the ranking member of the Senate Banking Committee.

In May, Shelby told reporters "I don't even know who my opponent is."

=== Predictions ===
Source	Ranking	As of
Cook Political Report	Solid R	October 26, 2010
Rothenberg	Safe R	October 22, 2010
RealClearPolitics	Safe R	October 26, 2010
Sabato's Crystal Ball	Safe R	October 21, 2010
CQ Politics	Safe R	October 26, 2010

=== Polling ===
Poll source	Date(s) administered	Sample size	Margin of error	Richard Shelby (R)	William G. Barnes (D)	Other	Undecided
Rasmussen Reports (report)	March 29, 2010	500	± 4.5%	59%	32%	3%	6%
Research 2000 (report)	May 17–19, 2010	600	± 4.0%	57%	33%	3%	7%
Rasmussen Reports (report)	May 25, 2010	500	± 4.5%	58%	31%	3%	8%
Rasmussen Reports (report)	June 3, 2010	500	± 4.5%	58%	31%	3%	7%
Rasmussen Reports (report)	July 22, 2010	500	± 4.5%	59%	29%	6%	6%
Rasmussen Reports (report)	August 19, 2010	500	± 4.5%	60%	28%	2%	10%
Rasmussen Reports (report)	September 21, 2010	500	± 4.5%	58%	30%	4%	8%

Hypothetical polling

Richard Shelby vs. generic Democrat

Poll source	Date(s) administered	Sample size	Margin of error	Richard Shelby (R)	Generic Democrat	Undecided
Public Policy Polling	March 27–29, 2010	1,270	±2.8%	55%	37%	8%

=== Fundraising ===
Candidate (party)	Receipts	Disbursements	Cash on hand	Debt
Richard Shelby (R)	$5,103,288	$1,456,041	$17,028,219	$0
William Barnes (D)	$0	$0	$0	$0
Source: Federal Election Commission

=== Results ===
2010 United States Senate election in Alabama
Party	Candidate	Votes	%	±%
Republican	Richard Shelby (incumbent)	968,181	65.18%	−2.37%
Democratic	William G. Barnes	515,619	34.71%	+2.36%
Write-in		1,699	0.11%	+0.01%
Total votes		1,485,499	100.00%	
Republican hold				

==== Counties that flipped from Republican to Democratic ====
- Russell (largest city: Phenix City)
- Montgomery (largest city: Montgomery)
