= Annette Shelby =

American academic (1939–2025)

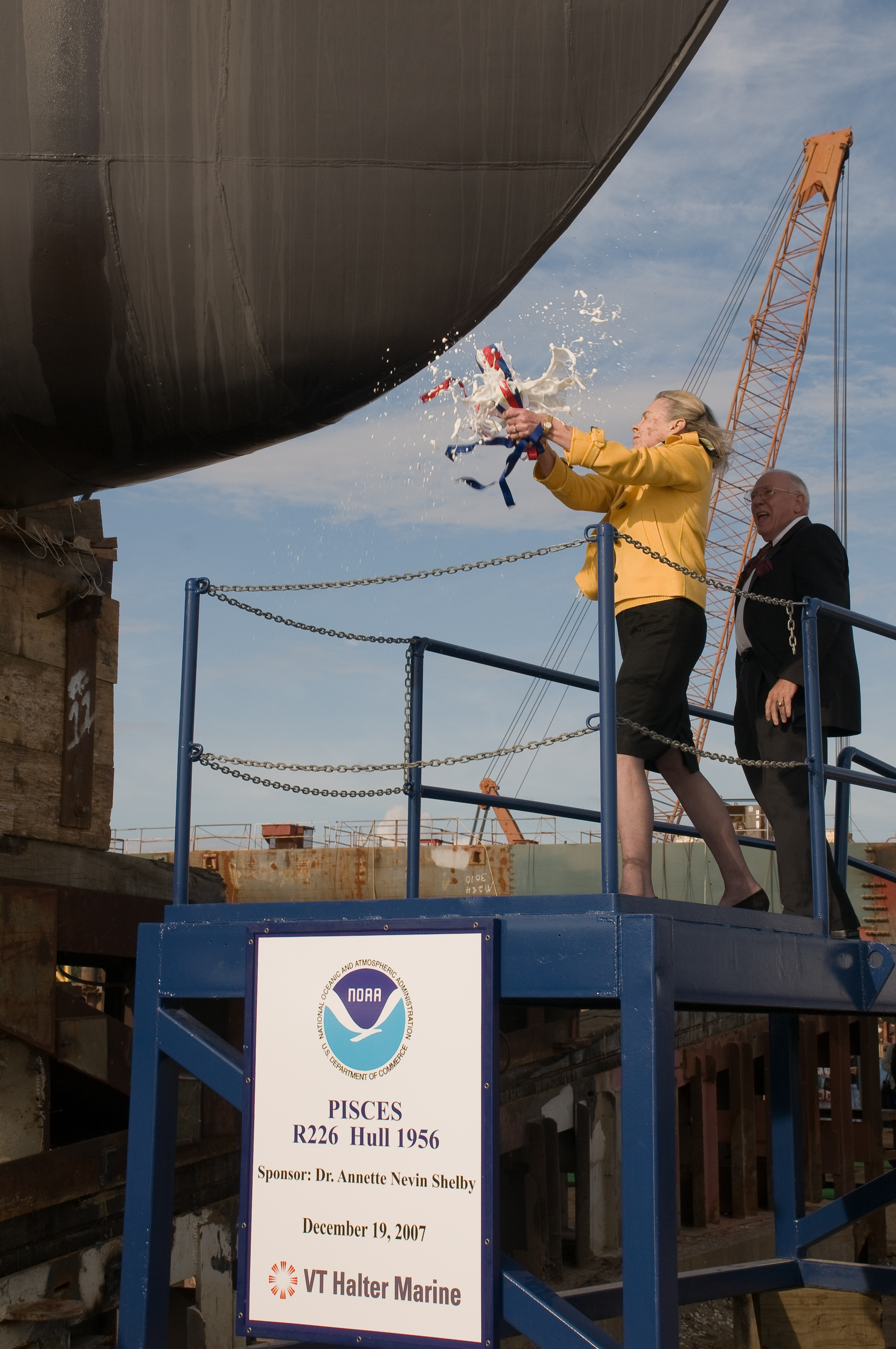
- Shelby christening the NOAA Pisces in 2007
- Born: Annette Nevin; January 22, 1939; Kinston, Alabama, U.S.
- Died: July 23, 2025 (aged 86); Tuscaloosa, Alabama, U.S.
- Education: University of Alabama (BA, MA); Louisiana State University (PhD)
- Occupation: professor
- Spouse: Richard Shelby (m. 1960)
- Children: 2

Annette Shelby (née Nevin; January 22, 1939 – July 23, 2025) was an American academic. She was the first woman to become a tenured full professor at Georgetown University's McDonough School of Business. In 2018, she was appointed to the Advisory Committee on the Arts of the John F. Kennedy Center for the Performing Arts by President Donald Trump.

== Early life and education ==
Shelby was born Annette Nevin on January 22, 1939, in Kinston, Alabama to educators Gladys Price and Edwin Claude Nevin.

She graduated from Kinston High School and attended Alabama College, where she was a member of Alpha Lambda Delta honor society and was active in the theatre program. She transferred to the University of Alabama, where she was a member of Delta Delta Delta sorority, Delta Sigma Rho-Tau Kappa Alpha honor society, Phi Beta Kappa honor society, and Mortar Board honor society. She graduated from the University of Alabama with a Bachelor of Arts degree and a Master of Arts degree in speech. She earned a doctorate from Louisiana State University, where she was elected into Pi Kappa Phi.

Shelby received an honorary Doctor of Humanities from the University of Alabama at Birmingham and an honorary Litterarum Humanorum Doctoris from the University of South Alabama.

== Career ==
Shelby was the first woman to become a tenured full professor at Georgetown University's McDonough School of Business.

She also served on the faculty at the University of Alabama as an instructor, and later as a tenured assistant professor, in the Department of Speech and as an associate professor in the School of Business. She was a founding board member of the Shelby Institute for Policy and Leadership at the University of Alabama. She received the Henry and Julia Tutwiler Award for service to the University of Alabama, the Frances S. Summersell Award for community service, and was inducted into the Judson College Hall of Fame and the Alabama Business and Professional Women's Hall of Fame.

Shelby had visiting teaching appointments at the University of Oxford and the Helsinki School of Economics. She was a member of the Tuscaloosa County Mental Health Board and the Lupus Foundation of America.

In 2007, she sponsored the oceanographic research vessel NOAAS Pisces. In 2018, she was appointed to the Advisory Committee on the Arts of the John F. Kennedy Center for the Performing Arts by President Donald Trump.

== Personal life and death ==
She was married to U.S. Senator Richard Shelby for 65 years, until her death. They had two sons, Richard Jr. and Claude. Shelby was a member of First Presbyterian Church of Tuscaloosa, where she taught Sunday school.

She died on July 23, 2025, at her home in Tuscaloosa, Alabama. She is buried at Tuscaloosa Memorial Park.
