= 1998 United States Senate election in Alabama =

- November 3, 1998
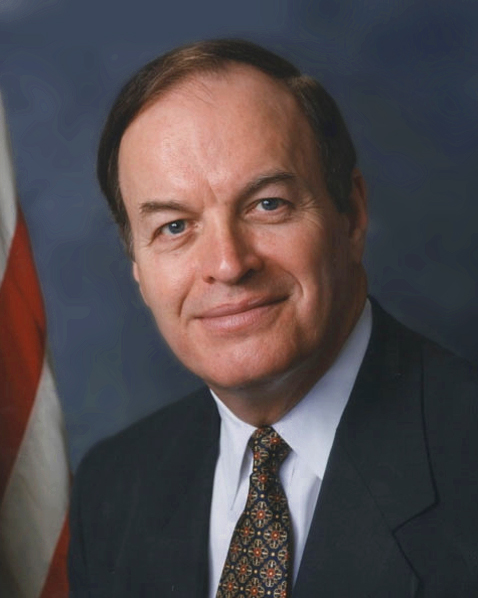

Nominee	Richard Shelby	Clayton Suddith
Party	Republican	Democratic
Popular vote	817,973	474,568
Percentage	63.24%	36.69%
- County results Shelby: 50–60% 60–70% 70–80% 80–90% Suddith: 50–60% 60–70% 70–80%
U.S. senator before election
Richard Shelby
Republican
Elected U.S. Senator
Richard Shelby
Republican

The 1998 United States Senate election in Alabama was held November 3, 1998, alongside other elections to the United States Senate in other states as well as elections to the United States House of Representatives and various state and local elections. Incumbent Senator Richard Shelby won re-election to a third term. He was first elected in 1986 and re-elected in 1992 as a Democrat and switched parties in 1994 after the Republican Revolution, making this the first election he competed in as a Republican.

== General election ==
=== Candidates ===
- Richard Shelby, incumbent U.S. senator since 1987 (Republican)
- Clayton Suddith, army veteran and former Franklin County commissioner (Democratic)

=== Polling ===
Poll source	Date(s) administered	Sample size (Note: Key: A – all adults RV – registered voters LV – likely voters V – unclear)	Margin of error	Richard Shelby (R)	Clayton Suddith (D)	Undecided
Mason-Dixon Polling & Strategy	October 24–26, 1998	808 (LV)	± 3.5%	62%	29%	9%
Mason-Dixon Polling & Strategy	October 10–12, 1998	807 (LV)	± 3.5%	62%	25%	13%
Mason-Dixon Polling & Strategy	September 14–15, 1998	803 (LV)	± 3.5%	58%	27%	15%
Mason-Dixon Polling & Strategy	June 22–24, 1998	804 (LV)	± 3.5%	57%	26%	17%

=== Results ===
1998 United States Senate election in Alabama
Party	Candidate	Votes	%
Republican	Richard Shelby (incumbent)	817,973	63.24%
Democratic	Clayton Suddith	474,568	36.69%
Write-in		864	0.07%
Total votes		1,293,405	100.0%
Republican hold			

== See also ==
- 1998 United States Senate elections
