= Richard Shelby =

American lawyer and politician (born 1934)

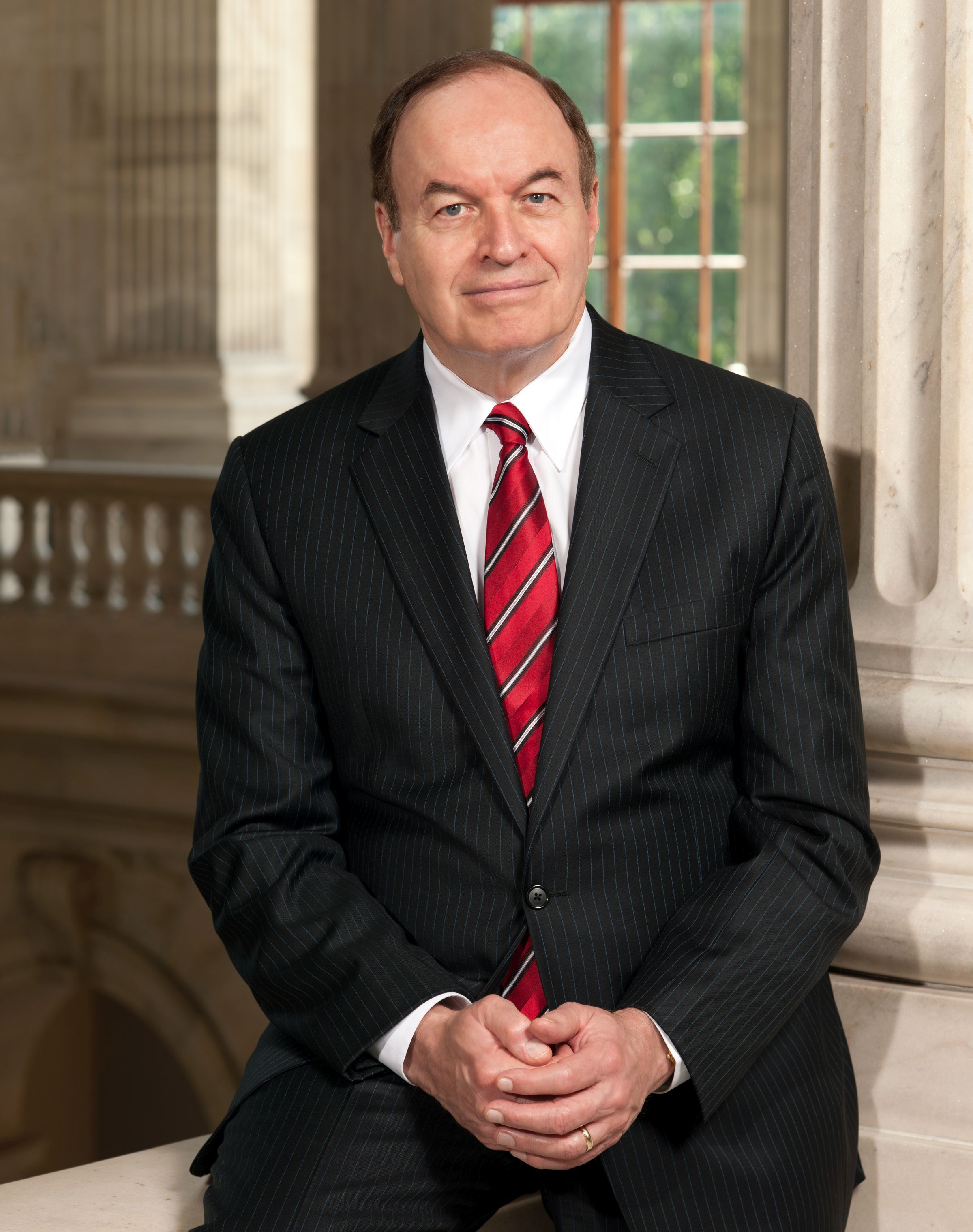
- Official portrait, 2011

United States Senator from Alabama
- In office January 3, 1987 – January 3, 2023
- Preceded by: Jeremiah Denton
- Succeeded by: Katie Britt
Senate positions
Chair of the Senate Appropriations Committee
In office April 10, 2018 – February 3, 2021
Preceded by	Thad Cochran
Succeeded by	Patrick Leahy
Chair of the Senate Rules Committee
In office January 3, 2017 – April 10, 2018
Preceded by	Roy Blunt
Succeeded by	Roy Blunt
Chair of the Senate Banking Committee
In office January 3, 2015 – January 3, 2017
Preceded by	Tim Johnson
Succeeded by	Mike Crapo
In office January 3, 2003 – January 3, 2007
Preceded by	Paul Sarbanes
Succeeded by	Chris Dodd
Chair of the Senate Intelligence Committee
In office January 20, 2001 – June 6, 2001
Preceded by	Bob Graham
Succeeded by	Bob Graham
In office January 3, 1997 – January 3, 2001
Preceded by	Arlen Specter
Succeeded by	Bob Graham

Member of the U.S. House of Representatives from Alabama's 7th district
- In office January 3, 1979 – January 3, 1987
- Preceded by: Walter Flowers
- Succeeded by: Claude Harris Jr.

Member of the Alabama Senate
- In office November 4, 1970 – November 8, 1978
- Preceded by: James Branyon
- Succeeded by: Ryan deGraffenried
- Constituency: 11th district (1970–1974); 16th district (1974–1978)

Personal details
- Born: Richard Craig Shelby; May 6, 1934 (age 92) Birmingham, Alabama, U.S.
- Party: Democratic (before 1994); Republican (1994–present)
- Spouse: Annette Nevin (m. 1960; died 2025)
- Children: 2
- Education: University of Alabama (BA, LLB)
- Shelby's voice Shelby introducing the Senate version of the Fair and Accurate Credit Transactions Act. Recorded November 4, 2003

Richard Craig Shelby (born May 6, 1934) is an American retired lawyer and politician who served as a United States senator from Alabama from 1987 to 2023. First elected to the U.S. Senate in 1986 as a Democrat, Shelby switched to the Republican Party in 1994. Shelby is the longest-serving U.S. senator from Alabama, holding office for exactly 36 years.

Born in Birmingham, Alabama, Shelby is a 1957 graduate of the University of Alabama. He was admitted to the Alabama bar in 1961 and earned an LL.B. from the University of Alabama School of Law in 1963. Shelby served as a Tuscaloosa city prosecutor from 1963 to 1971. He also worked as a U.S. magistrate for the Northern District of Alabama and as a special assistant Attorney General of Alabama. Shelby served in the Alabama State Senate from 1970 to 1978, when he was elected from the 7th district to the United States House of Representatives. He served in the House until 1987; during his House tenure, he was among a group of conservative Democrats known as the boll weevils.

In 1986, Shelby was elected to the U.S. Senate in a tight race. In 1994, the day after the Republican Revolution in which the GOP gained the majority in Congress midway through President Bill Clinton's first term, Shelby switched parties and became a Republican. He was reelected by a large margin in 1998, facing no significant electoral opposition thereafter. Apart from his narrow win as a Democrat in 1986, Shelby always won his Senate seat with more than 60% of the vote.

Shelby chaired the Senate Appropriations Committee from 2018 to 2021, and he also chaired the Senate Intelligence Committee, the Senate Banking Committee, and the Senate Rules Committee.

In February 2021, Shelby announced that he would not seek reelection in 2022. Katie Britt, his former chief of staff, was elected to succeed him.

== Early life and education ==
Shelby was born in Birmingham, Alabama on May 6, 1934. He is the son of Alice L. (née Skinner) and Ozie Houston Shelby and is a fifth-generation Alabamian. Shelby received a bachelor's degree from the University of Alabama in 1957, was admitted to the Alabama State Bar in 1961, and received an LL.B. from the University of Alabama School of Law in 1963.

== Early career ==
Shelby was a city prosecutor in Tuscaloosa, Alabama from 1963 to 1971. He also worked as a U.S. Magistrate for the Northern District of Alabama and as a special assistant state attorney general.

Shelby was elected to the Alabama Senate in 1970 and served until 1978, when he was elected to the U.S. House of Representatives. He was reelected to Congress three times, serving until 1987. Shelby was one of the more conservative Democrats in Congress, and a member of the boll weevils, a group of moderate to conservative-leaning Democrats who often worked with President Ronald Reagan on defense issues.

== U.S. Senate ==
=== Elections ===
==== 1986 ====
In the 1986 U.S. Senate election in Alabama, Shelby won the Democratic nomination for the Senate seat held by Republican Jeremiah Denton, the first Republican elected to the Senate from Alabama since Reconstruction. He won a very close race as the Democrats regained control of the Senate.

==== 1992 ====
Shelby was easily reelected even as Bill Clinton lost Alabama's electoral votes.

==== 1998 ====
On November 9, 1994, one day after the Republican Revolution in which Republicans won control of both houses in the midterm elections, Shelby switched his party affiliation to Republican. Shelby's party switch gave the Republicans a 53–47 majority in the Senate. He won his first election as a Republican in 1998 by a large margin.

==== 2004 ====
Shelby faced no significant opposition in 2004.

A September 2009 poll showed Shelby had a 58% approval rating, with 35% disapproving.

==== 2010 ====
Shelby again faced no significant opposition and was reelected to a fifth term.

In 2014, The Wall Street Journal criticized Shelby for hoarding campaign and PAC contributions and not sharing them with colleagues.

==== 2016 ====
Shelby was reelected to a sixth term in 2016.

=== Tenure ===
==== 1980s ====
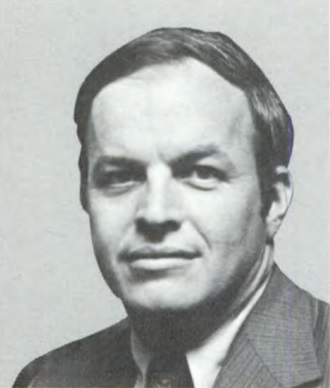
Shelby during his tenure in the U.S. House of Representatives, 1981.

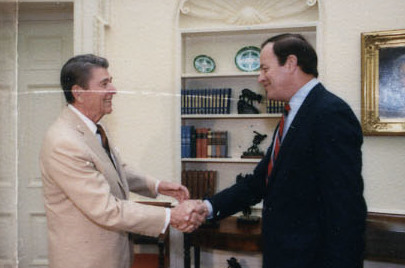
Shelby greeting President Ronald Reagan in 1988

In 1987, Shelby opposed Reagan's nomination of Robert Bork to the Supreme Court, a move attributed to lobbying by Alabama African-American leaders who reminded Shelby that he had relied on support from black voters in narrowly defeating Denton in 1986. In 1991, Shelby supported President George H. W. Bush's conservative Supreme Court nominee Clarence Thomas.

==== 1990s ====
In 1991, Shelby sponsored legislation granting federal recognition to the MOWA Band of Choctaw Indians. Though confident it would pass, Shelby stressed the "need to get more documentation regarding establishment of their tribal identity." The Senate Select Committee on Indian Affairs voted 11 to 2 in favor of the legislation on July 18.

Shelby publicly feuded with President Bill Clinton during the first half of Clinton's first term. At a meeting with Vice President Al Gore, he turned to the TV cameras and denounced the Clinton program as "high on taxes, low on [spending] cuts".

Shelby served on the Senate Select Committee on Intelligence from 1995 to 2003, stepping down because of a Senate rule limiting committee terms to eight years. He took an adversarial stance toward the intelligence community during both the Clinton and Bush administrations. He helped sink Anthony Lake's nomination as CIA director in 1997 and promised to investigate the use of American-made satellites by the Chinese to gather intelligence. Shelby took a hard line on leaks of classified information. In 2000 he introduced a bill, vetoed by Clinton, "that would have broadened the law that criminalizes release of national defense information." According to The Washington Post:

Civil liberties groups and news organizations, which argued that the legislation would chill their ability to get information from officials, lobbied for the veto. ...In 2002, with George W. Bush in the White House, Shelby reintroduced his language, but then-Attorney General John D. Ashcroft said that "rigorous investigation" and enforcement of existing laws—not new legislation—were the best way to fight leaks.

In 1991, Shelby supported the Crime Bill S.1241 sponsored by Senator Joseph Biden that instituted a national waiting period for handgun purchases as well as a federal ban on semi-automatic firearms.

In January 1992, Shelby met with Chair of the Federal Reserve Alan Greenspan, advocating that the basic cost of money be reduced from 3.5% to 3% to stimulate the economy. He confirmed afterward that he intended to vote for Greenspan for another term as Federal Reserve Chair and said that Greenspan was not opposed to his suggestion to cut the discount rate to its lowest in 20 years in addition to agreeing with him on the need for a restoration of investment tax credits and a special tax rate for capital gains along with the providing of incentives to encourage savings.

In 1992, Shelby's aide Tom Barnes was murdered in a hold-up robbery. In response, Shelby supported the reinstatement of the death penalty in D.C.

In 1999, Shelby opposed the Gramm–Leach–Bliley Act, which repealed parts of the Glass–Steagall Legislation, and was the only Republican senator and one of eight senators overall to vote against it. (Note: Fifty-two Republicans and 38 Democrats voted for the bill. Shelby voted against it as did seven Democratic Senators: Barbara Boxer (Calif.), Richard Bryan (Nevada), Byron Dorgan (N. Dakota), Russell Feingold (Wisc.), Tom Harkin (Iowa), Barbara Mikulski (Maryland) and Paul Wellstone (Minn.). Sen. Peter Fitzgerald (R-Illinois) voted "present", while Sen. John McCain (R-Arizona) did not vote.)

On February 12, 1999, Shelby was one of 50 senators to vote to convict and remove Bill Clinton from office.

==== 2000s ====
Shelby was highly critical of CIA Director George Tenet in the aftermath of the September 11 attacks. From 2003 until 2007, he chaired the Senate Committee on Banking, Housing and Urban Affairs. As of 2022, he was a member of the Appropriations Committee and chaired its subcommittee on Commerce, Justice and Science and was formerly a member of the Special Committee on Aging. He lost his chairmanships in 2007 when Democrats regained control of the Senate.

In 2004, a federal investigation concluded that Shelby revealed classified information to the media while a member of the Senate Intelligence Committee. Specifically, he revealed classified information on June 19, 2002, to Carl Cameron, the chief political correspondent on Fox News. The information consisted of two messages between Al-Qaeda operatives intercepted by the National Security Agency on September 10, 2001, but not translated until the day after the attacks—"the match is about to begin" and "tomorrow is zero hour." The Department of Justice declined to file criminal charges against Shelby and transferred the case to the Senate Ethics Committee. In 2005 the committee concluded its probe into the leak.

As chair of the Senate Committee on Banking, Housing, & Urban Affairs, Shelby opposed legislation that would have permitted additional competition in the title insurance industry.

Shelby co-chaired the Congressional Privacy Caucus and Zero Capital Gains Tax Caucus. He was also the Senate co-chair of the National Security Caucus and a member of the National Republican Senatorial Committee and the Senate Centrist Coalition.

In March 2009, as the Obama administration was expected to reverse limits on embryonic stem-cell research imposed by the Bush administration, Shelby said, "My basic tenet here is I don't think we should create life to enhance life and to do research and so forth. I know that people argue there are other ways. I think we should continue our biomedical research everywhere we can, but we should have some ethics about it." Later that month, he was one of 14 senators to vote against a procedural move that essentially guaranteed a major expansion of a national service corps. The Congressional Budget Office estimated the bill's cost for the fiscal year 2010 of $418 million and around $5.7 billion for 2010 through 2014.

In February 2010, Shelby placed a hold on more than 70 of Obama's nominees to various government posts, in a protest over an Air Force KC-135 Stratotanker contract and the FBI's Terrorist Explosive Device Analytical Center. He lifted all but three of the holds three days later, saying, "The purpose of placing numerous holds was to get the White House's attention on two issues that are critical to our national security—the Air Force's aerial refueling tanker acquisition and the FBI's Terrorist Device Analytical Center (TEDAC). With that accomplished, Sen. Shelby has decided to release his holds on all but a few nominees directly related to the Air Force tanker acquisition until the new Request for Proposal is issued." White House spokesman Robert Gibbs criticized Shelby for "hold[ing] up qualified nominees for positions that are needed because he didn't get two earmarks"; Shelby denied the holds were over earmarks.

==== 2010s ====
Shelby's high campaign contribution spending has been criticized; from 2008 until 2014 he had reimbursed himself and his wife more than $500,000 from his campaign and leadership PACs. The Wall Street Journal called him a "stingy lawmaker".

In May 2011, Shelby was one of five Republicans to vote against a Republican bill expanding offshore oil and gas drilling in U.S. coastal waters and requiring the Interior Department to complete multiple offshore lease sales in the Gulf of Mexico and off the coasts of Virginia and Alaska.

In March 2015, Shelby announced the Senate Banking, Housing, and Urban Affairs Committee would "review proposals aimed at providing greater clarity in Fed decision-making and at reforming the composition of Federal Reserve System" and that he had asked for input from the original regional reserve bank presidents for the Federal Reserve.

In March 2017, Shelby called Supreme Court nominee Neil Gorsuch "an outstanding nominee” and said that Republicans should abolish the filibuster for Supreme Court nominees if Democrats blocked his appointment, arguing that that party used the "nuclear option" first.

In December 2017, after Senate Judiciary Committee Chairman Chuck Grassley issued a statement requesting that the nomination of Brett Talley for federal judge in Alabama be withdrawn, a spokesman for Shelby said that Shelby considered Talley "a great young attorney" and had spoken with him the previous week while asking "for his letter of withdrawal in hopes that Mr. Talley can gain more experience."

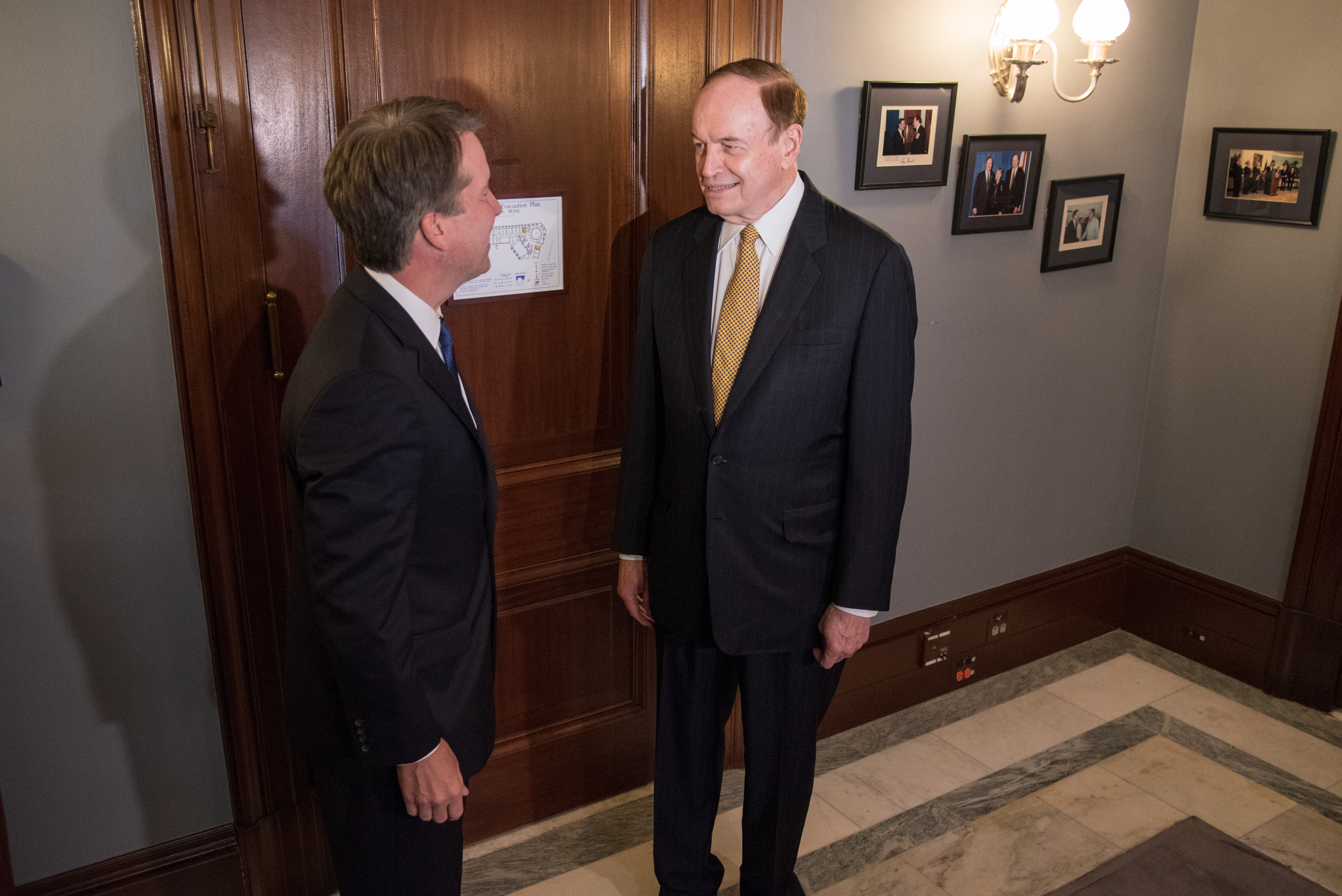
Shelby and Brett Kavanaugh in July 2018

In August 2018, after Rand Paul proposed an amendment to tie a spending bill to the funding of Planned Parenthood, Shelby warned that the amendment could attract supporters while becoming a spoiler for a larger government spending bill.

In September 2018, Shelby reported that the House and Senate were close to a deal on a third package of spending bills for 2019. Representative Nita Lowey disputed the claim, saying that she did not believe a deal would be reached until after the House adjourned and a House Republican aide responded that there was no time to complete the package.

In November 2018, Shelby, Senators Mitch McConnell, and John Thune met with President Trump at the White House, Shelby stating after the meeting that he told Trump the Republicans should avoid a partial government shutdown over Trump's wishes for a border wall and that he was unsure whether Trump's position was affected by his comments.

In February 2019, after Trump delivered the 2019 State of the Union Address, Shelby called it a reiteration of Trump's support for the U.S.-Mexico border wall and confirmed an interaction with House Appropriations Committee chair Nita Lowey, a leading Democratic negotiator.

Shelby is the longest-serving U.S. senator from Alabama, having surpassed Senator John Sparkman's record in March 2019.

==== 2020s ====
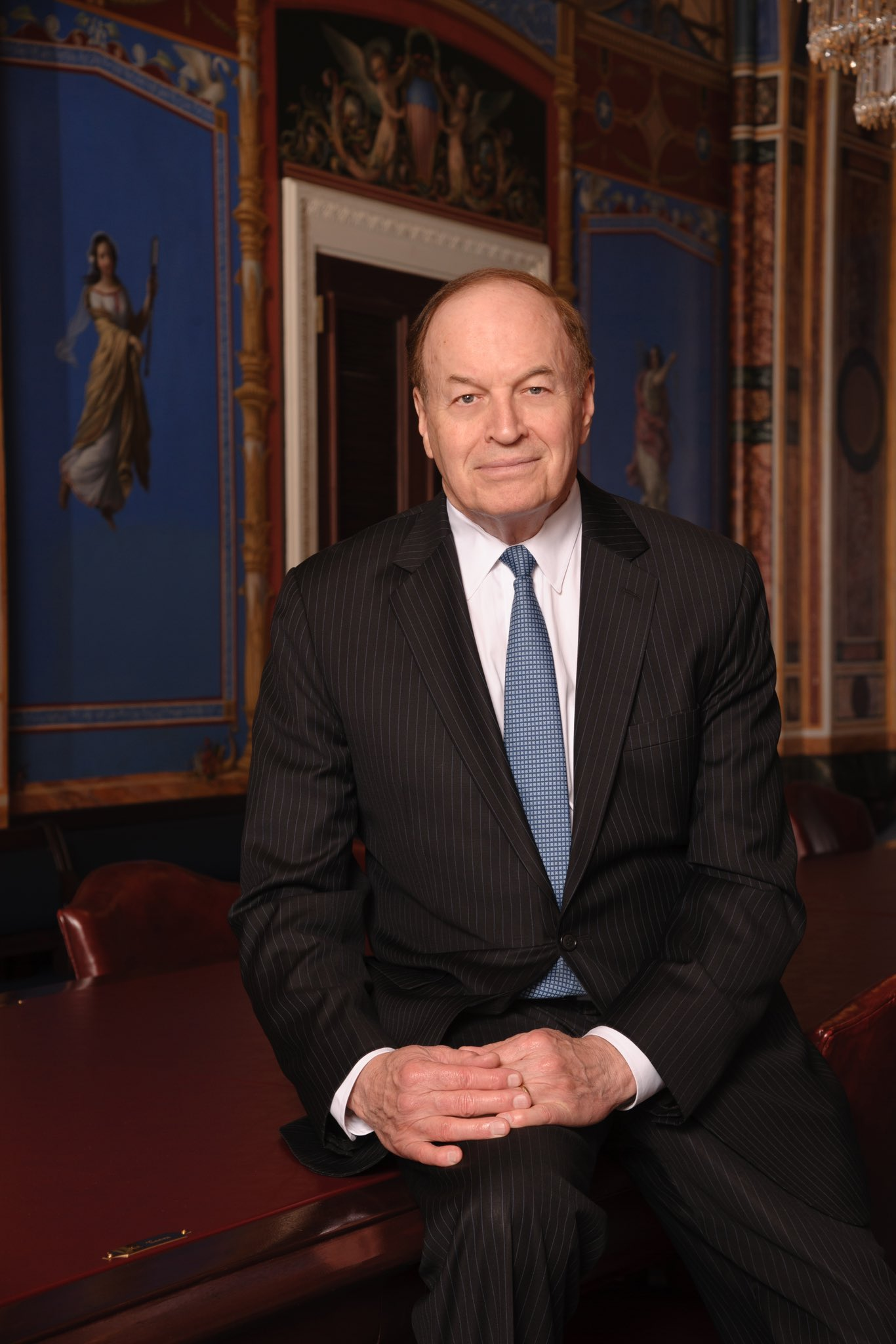
Shelby in 2022

In September 2020, with less than two months left in the presidential election, Shelby supported an immediate Senate vote on Trump's nominee to fill the Supreme Court vacancy caused by Justice Ruth Bader Ginsburg's death. Yet in March 2016, Shelby refused to consider Obama's Supreme Court nominee, saying the "decision should be made after the upcoming presidential election so that the American people have a voice."

During the January 6 United States Capitol attack, Shelby called for law and order via Twitter. When Congress reconvened to certify the 2021 United States Electoral College vote count, Shelby voted to accept the results of the election. On February 13, 2021, Shelby voted to acquit Trump of inciting the Capitol attack.

In February 2021, Shelby announced that he would not seek re-election in 2022.

In August 2021, Shelby prevented an attempt to limit cryptocurrency tax-reporting requirements in the Senate infrastructure bill.

Shelby became known for his success in securing federal funds for his home state of Alabama and for his extensive use of congressional earmarks.

Katie Britt, Shelby's former chief of staff, was elected to succeed him in November 2022.

=== Committee assignments ===
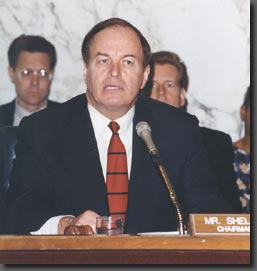
Senator Shelby chairing the Senate Committee on Banking, Housing and Urban Affairs

- Senate Committee on Appropriations (ranking member)
  - Subcommittee on Commerce, Justice and Science
  - Subcommittee on Defense (vice chair)
  - Subcommittee on Energy and Water Development
  - Subcommittee on Homeland Security
  - Subcommittee on Labor, Health and Human Services, Education & Related Agencies
  - Subcommittee on Transportation, Housing and Urban Development, and Related Agencies
- Senate Committee on Banking, Housing & Urban Affairs (former chair)
- Senate Committee on Rules and Administration (former chair)
- Joint Committee of Congress on the Library (vice chair)

=== Caucus memberships ===
- Senate Republican Conference

== Political positions ==
=== Abortion ===
Shelby opposes abortion and said on his Senate campaign website that Roe v. Wade is "terribly flawed on both a constitutional and moral basis." He also opposes taxpayer funding of Planned Parenthood and voted against a short-term funding bill in Congress because it did not defund Planned Parenthood. When Roe v. Wade was overturned in June 2022, Shelby called it "welcome news" and said, "It is our moral and ethical duty to protect the dignity of human life, particularly when it comes to the unborn."

=== Budget and economy ===
Both during the George W. Bush administration, in 2008, and the Obama administration, in 2009, Shelby was vocal in his opposition to bailing out banks and other corporations (such as AIG).

In 2010, Shelby initially opposed the Republican Party's moratorium on earmark funding. The same year, he voted to block three amendments to regulate banks, including an amendment #3812 to S. 3217 to cap ATM fees at $0.50 per transaction and to bar banks borrowing taxpayer money through TARP funds to use those funds for their own benefit.

In 2011, Shelby opposed the nomination of Nobel Economics Prize laureate and Massachusetts Institute of Technology professor Peter Diamond to the board of the Federal Reserve on the grounds that Diamond lacked "the appropriate background, experience, [and] policy preferences" for the position. Since becoming Senate Banking chair, Shelby made "regulatory relief and financial regulation reform his top priority". In May 2015, he revealed the so-called Shelby Bill, easing regulatory restrictions on smaller banks and increasing scrutiny of the Federal Reserve.

In May 2015, Shelby introduced legislation that if enacted would increase congressional scrutiny of the Federal Reserve and ease some regulatory burdens on multiple small banks and loosen oversight to banks such as U.S. Bancorp and SunTrust Banks enacted under the Dodd-Frank Act. In a written statement, he called the legislation "a working document intended to initiate a conversation with all members of the committee who are interested in reaching a bipartisan agreement to improve access to credit and to reduce the level of risk in our financial system."

=== Civil rights ===
Shelby voted to make English the sole language of the federal government.

He voted for the Federal Marriage Amendment.

=== Bill Clinton ===
In 1993, Shelby, who was still a Democrat at the time, was one of six Democratic senators to vote against the Omnibus Budget Reconciliation Act of 1993.

In 1999, Shelby was one of ten Republican senators to vote to acquit President Bill Clinton on the charge of perjury when Clinton was tried in the Senate in 1999, but he voted to convict Clinton of obstruction of justice.

=== Foreign policy ===
==== Iran ====
In December 2002, Shelby said, "We don't need another nuclear power -- not with Iran sponsoring terrorism that it has in the past. The fact that they are seemingly pursuing an avenue to build nuclear weapons should be disturbing to everybody."

In March 2015, Shelby was one of 47 Republican senators to sign a letter to Iran warning that a nuclear deal with the U.S. would have to first be approved by Congress. In July, he called the Joint Comprehensive Plan of Action "a bad deal" and questioned why the U.S. would support the agreement if Russia President Vladimir Putin favored it.

In September 2016, Shelby was one of 34 senators to sign a letter to United States Secretary of State John Kerry advocating that the U.S. use "all available tools to dissuade Russia from continuing its airstrikes in Syria" from an Iranian airbase near Hamadan "that are clearly not in our interest" and stating that the US should enforce the airstrikes' violation of "a legally binding Security Council Resolution" on Iran.

==== Russia ====
In December 2010, Shelby was one of 26 senators to vote against the ratification of New Start, a nuclear arms reduction treaty between the U.S. and the Russian Federation obliging both countries to have no more than 1,550 strategic warheads as well as 700 launchers deployed during the next seven years along with providing a continuation of on-site inspections that halted when START I expired the previous year. It was the first arms treaty with Russia in eight years. In January 2021, Shelby voted for Senate measure S.3436, which would impose sanctions on operators of the Nord Stream pipeline. Democrats blocked the measure.

==== Saudi Arabia ====
In March 2018, Shelby voted to table a resolution spearheaded by Bernie Sanders, Chris Murphy, and Mike Lee that would have required Trump to withdraw American troops either in or influencing Yemen in the next 30 days unless they were combating Al-Qaeda.

=== Second Amendment ===
In 2016, Shelby voted against the Feinstein Amendment, which sought to stop the sale of firearms to people known or suspected to be terrorists. Asked by Scott Wapner why he voted against it, Shelby said, "I do believe that we should keep guns out of the hands of terrorists, would-be terrorists, and a lot of other people."

In January 2019, Shelby was one of 31 Republican senators to cosponsor the Constitutional Concealed Carry Reciprocity Act, a bill introduced by John Cornyn and Ted Cruz that would grant individuals with concealed carry privileges in their home state the right to exercise this right in any other state with concealed carry laws while concurrently abiding by that state’s laws.

=== Health care ===
Shelby opposed Obama's health reform legislation, voting against the Affordable Care Act in December 2009 and against the Health Care and Education Reconciliation Act of 2010.

In August 2009, Shelby opined that the United States had "the best health care system in the world" and cited the need to expand the system without destroying it.

After Senator Ted Cruz's 21-hour speech opposing the Affordable Care Act, Shelby joined Cruz and 17 other senators in a failed vote against cloture on a comprehensive government funding bill that would also have continued funding healthcare reform.

In September 2017, after the Senate reached an agreement during a lunch not to vote on a Republican bill to repeal the Affordable Care Act that week, Shelby said, "Why have a vote if you know what the outcome is and it's not what you want? I don't know what you gain from that. But I do believe that the health care issue is not dead, and that's what counts."

=== Immigration ===
Shelby voted for a 1994 moratorium on certain forms of immigration.

=== Space ===
Shelby has supported development of the Space Launch System (SLS), but disagreed with how funds for the program have been spent. In 2011, he favored competition for the strap-on booster design. The SLS earmark has been opposed by fiscal conservative groups, including the Tea Party.

=== Taxes ===
Shelby supports a flat tax and supported the Bush Administration's tax cuts. He cites disagreements with Democrats on tax policy as one of the main reasons he became a Republican; he feels the Democrats are too willing to enact tax increases.

Shelby is a signer of Americans for Tax Reform's Taxpayer Protection Pledge.

=== Roy Moore ===
Shelby declined to support fellow Republican Roy Moore in the 2017 United States Senate special election in Alabama, stating that he instead cast a write-in ballot in support of a "distinguished Republican candidate". Moore, who was accused of sexual misconduct by several women, lost the election to Democrat Doug Jones.

=== Donald Trump ===
During the first impeachment trial of Donald Trump, Shelby opposed the introduction of new witnesses and voted to acquit.

During the second impeachment trial of Donald Trump, Shelby voted to acquit based on his belief that impeachment does not apply to former officials.

On May 28, 2021, Shelby abstained from voting on the creation of an independent commission to investigate the 2021 United States Capitol attack.

=== Veterans ===
In 2022, Shelby was among the 11 Senators who voted against the Honoring our PACT Act of 2022 (a bill that provided funding for research and benefits for up to 3.5 million veterans exposed to toxic substances during their service).

== Buildings named after him ==
- The Shelby Hall Research Center at the University of Alabama is named for Shelby and his wife, a professor emerita at the university. The 200,000 square feet (19,000 m^{2}) new center opened in 2007 and combines mathematics, chemistry and biology research in one building.
- The Richard C. and Annette N. Shelby Interdisciplinary Biomedical Research Building at the University of Alabama at Birmingham opened in April 2006. The 12-story building cost $70 million and is 310,000 square feet (29,000 m^{2}).
- The Senator Richard C. and Dr. Annette N. Shelby Center for Engineering Technology, part of the Samuel Ginn College of Engineering at Auburn University, was dedicated on April 18, 2008. Shelby helped secure $30 million of the $54 million cost of Phase I of the project.
- In Mobile, Shelby Hall houses the University of South Alabama College of Engineering and School of Computer and Information Sciences. The 155,000 square feet (14,400 m^{2}) facility was named after Richard and Annette Shelby for their commitment to higher education in Alabama. Senator Shelby was instrumental for securing $40 million in federal grants to fund the $50 million project. The building was dedicated on September 9, 2012.
- The 207,000-square-foot Shelby Center for Science and Technology was dedicated at the University of Alabama in Huntsville in October 2007. It includes 18 teaching laboratories, 13 classrooms, 15 research laboratories, two teaching auditoriums, and 146 offices.
- The Richard C. Shelby Atrium and Auditorium at Dauphin Island Sea Lab, a state-of-the-art video conferencing center, the first of its kind along the Gulf Coast, has earned the distinguished LEEDS certification for the reduction of negative environmental impact in construction practices and materials.
- The Richard C. Shelby Center for Missile Intelligence serves as the headquarters of the Missile and Space Intelligence Center (MSIC), a component of the Defense Intelligence Agency in Huntsville, Alabama. Shelby has supported MSIC in the past.
- Shelby Field, an airport in Abbeville

== Electoral history ==
Year	Office	Party	Primary			General				Result	Swing
Year	Office	Party	Total	%	P.	Total	%	±%	P.	Result	Swing
1986	U.S. Senator	Democratic	420,155	51.33%	1st	609,360	50.28%	+3.23%	1st	Won	Gain
1992	U.S. Senator	Democratic	Uncontested			1,022,698	64.81%	+14.53%	1st	Won	Hold
1998	U.S. Senator	Republican	Uncontested			817,973	63.24%	+30.16%	1st	Won	Gain
2004	U.S. Senator	Republican	Uncontested			1,242,200	67.55%	+4.31%	1st	Won	Hold
2010	U.S. Senator	Republican	405,042	84.34%	1st	968,181	65.18%	–2.37%	1st	Won	Hold
2016	U.S. Senator	Republican	505,586	64.91%	1st	1,335,104	63.96%	–1.22%	1st	Won	Hold

== Personal life ==
Shelby was married to Annette Nevin Shelby for 65 years, until her death on July 23, 2025. They had two sons: Richard Jr. and Claude. As of 2018, according to OpenSecrets, Shelby's net worth was more than $19 million.

== See also ==
- List of American politicians who switched parties in office
- List of United States senators who switched parties

== Explanatory notes ==
U.S. House of Representatives
Preceded by Walter Flowers	Member of the U.S. House of Representatives from Alabama's 7th congressional district 1979–1987	Succeeded by Claude Harris
Party political offices
Preceded by Jim Folsom	Democratic nominee for U.S. Senator from Alabama (Class 3); 1986, 1992	Succeeded by Clayton Suddith
Preceded by Richard Sellers	Republican nominee for U.S. Senator from Alabama (Class 3); 1998, 2004, 2010, 2016	Succeeded by Katie Britt
U.S. Senate
Preceded by Jeremiah Denton	U.S. Senator (Class 3) from Alabama; 1987–2023; Served alongside: Howell Heflin, Jeff Sessions, Luther Strange, Doug Jones, Tommy Tuberville	Succeeded by Katie Britt
Preceded by Arlen Specter	Chair of the Senate Intelligence Committee; 1997–2001	Succeeded by Bob Graham
Preceded by Bob Graham	Vice Chair of the Senate Intelligence Committee; 2001–2003	Succeeded by Jay Rockefeller
Preceded by Paul Sarbanes	Chair of the Senate Banking Committee; 2003–2007	Succeeded by Chris Dodd
Preceded by Paul Sarbanes	Ranking Member of the Senate Banking Committee; 2007–2013	Succeeded by Mike Crapo
Preceded by Thad Cochran	Ranking Member of the Senate Appropriations Committee; 2013–2015	Succeeded by Barbara Mikulski
Preceded by Tim Johnson	Chair of the Senate Banking Committee; 2015–2017	Succeeded by Mike Crapo
Preceded by Roy Blunt	Chair of the Senate Rules Committee; 2017–2018	Succeeded by Roy Blunt
Preceded by Gregg Harper	Chair of the Joint Printing Committee; 2017–2018	Succeeded by Roy Blunt
Preceded by Thad Cochran	Chair of the Senate Appropriations Committee; 2018–2021	Succeeded by Patrick Leahy
Preceded by Patrick Leahy	Ranking Member of the Senate Appropriations Committee; 2021–2023	Succeeded by Susan Collins
U.S. order of precedence (ceremonial)
Preceded by Don Nickles as Former U.S. Senate Majority Whip	Order of precedence of the United States as Former U.S. Senator	Succeeded by Max Baucus as Former U.S. Senator
