= 2004 United States Senate election in Alabama =

- November 2, 2004
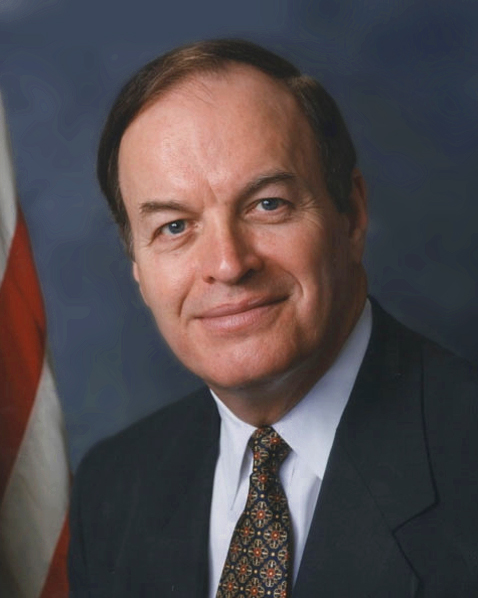

Nominee	Richard Shelby	Wayne Sowell
Party	Republican	Democratic
Popular vote	1,242,200	595,018
Percentage	67.55%	32.35%
- Shelby: 50–60% 60–70% 70–80% 80–90% Sowell: 50–60% 60–70% 70–80%
U.S. senator before election
Richard Shelby
Republican
Elected U.S. Senator
Richard Shelby
Republican

The 2004 United States Senate election in Alabama took place on November 2, 2004, alongside other elections to the United States Senate in other states as well as elections to the United States House of Representatives and various state and local elections. Incumbent Republican Senator Richard Shelby won re-election to a fourth term.

== Candidates ==
=== Republican ===
- Richard Shelby, incumbent U.S. Senator since 1987

=== Democratic ===
- Wayne Sowell, perennial candidate

== General election ==
=== Campaign ===
Shelby, who switched parties ten years prior, had over $11 million cash on hand. Shelby was Chairman of the Banking Committee. Wayne Sowell became the first black U.S. Senate nominee of a major party in Alabama.

=== Predictions ===
Source	Ranking	As of
Sabato's Crystal Ball	Safe R	November 1, 2004

=== Results ===
2004 United States Senate election in Alabama
Party	Candidate	Votes	%
Republican	Richard Shelby (incumbent)	1,242,200	67.55%
Democratic	Wayne Sowell	595,018	32.35%
Write-in		1,848	0.10%
Total votes		1,839,066	100.00%
Republican hold			

==== Counties that flipped from Democratic to Republican ====
- Russell (largest city: Phenix City)

==== By congressional district ====
Shelby won six of seven congressional districts, including one that elected a Democrat.

District	Shelby	Sowell	Representative
1st	68%	32%	Jo Bonner
2nd	71%	28%	Terry Everett
3rd	63%	37%	Mike D. Rogers
4th	75%	25%	Robert Aderholt
5th	67%	32%	Bud Cramer
6th	83%	17%	Spencer Bachus
7th	40%	60%	Artur Davis

== See also ==
- 2004 United States Senate elections
