= 1992 United States Senate election in Alabama =

- November 3, 1992
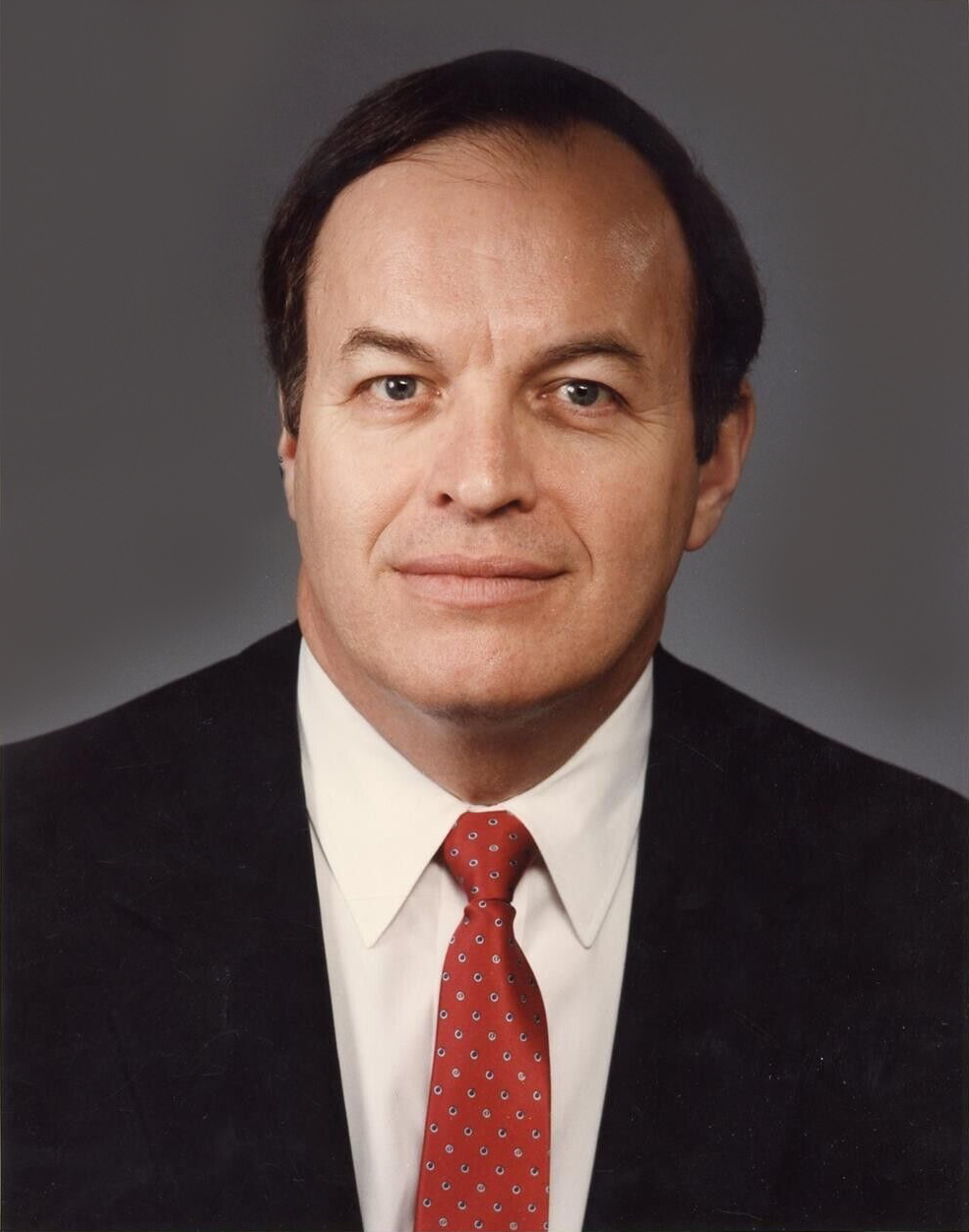

Nominee	Richard Shelby	Richard Sellers
Party	Democratic	Republican
Popular vote	1,022,698	522,015
Percentage	64.82%	33.09%
- County results Shelby: 50–60% 60–70% 70–80% 80–90% >90% Sellers: 50–60%
U.S. senator before election
Richard Shelby
Democratic
Elected U.S. Senator
Richard Shelby
Democratic

The 1992 United States Senate election in Alabama took place on November 3, 1992, alongside other elections to the United States Senate in other states as well as elections to the United States House of Representatives and various state and local elections. Incumbent Senator Richard Shelby won re-election to a second term in a landslide, winning every county except Shelby.

This was the last time a Democrat was elected to the U.S. Senate in Alabama until Doug Jones won a 2017 special election. As to date, this remains the last time a Democrat has won the Class 3 Senate seat in Alabama and won a full term as a senator; Shelby switched parties in 1994 and continued to serve as a Republican until 2023.

== Candidates ==
=== Democratic ===
- Richard Shelby, incumbent U.S. Senator since 1987

=== Republican ===
- Richard Sellers, conservative activist

== Results ==
1992 United States Senate election in Alabama
Party	Candidate	Votes	%
Democratic	Richard Shelby (incumbent)	1,022,698	64.82%
Republican	Richard Sellers	522,015	33.09%
Libertarian	Jerome Shockley	31,811	2.02%
Write-in		1,275	0.08%
Total votes		1,577,799	100.0%
Democratic hold			

=== Results by County ===
1992 United States Senate Election in Alabama (By County)
County	Richard Shelby Democratic		Richard Sellers Republican		Jerome Shockley Libertarian		Total
County	#	%	#	%	#	%	Total
Autauga	9,012	66.59%	4,279	31.62%	242	1.79%	13,533
Baldwin	21,036	50.83%	19,258	46.53%	1,094	2.64%	41,388
Barbour	5,783	72.15%	2,087	26.04%	145	1.81%	8,015
Bibb	4,877	73.31%	1,698	25.52%	78	1.17%	6,653
Blount	8,311	56.51%	5,974	40.62%	421	2.86%	14,706
Bullock	3,564	87.20%	480	11.74%	43	1.05%	4,087
Butler	5,305	75.15%	1,655	23.45%	99	1.40%	7,059
Calhoun	22,735	59.90%	14,190	37.38%	1,033	2.72%	37,958
Chambers	8,187	66.03%	3,942	31.80%	269	2.17%	12,398
Cherokee	5,004	76.49%	1,372	20.97%	166	2.54%	6,542
Chilton	9,636	67.77%	4,409	31.01%	174	1.22%	14,219
Choctaw	5,069	80.54%	1,195	18.99%	30	0.48%	6,294
Clarke	6,655	66.35%	3,260	32.50%	115	1.15%	10,030
Clay	3,061	67.84%	1,309	29.01%	142	3.15%	4,512
Cleburne	2,560	63.48%	1,354	33.57%	119	2.95%	4,033
Coffee	10,222	73.66%	3,420	24.64%	236	1.70%	13,878
Colbert	16,589	75.84%	4,965	22.70%	321	1.47%	21,875
Conecuh	3,679	77.37%	980	20.61%	96	2.02%	4,755
Coosa	3,452	73.38%	1,152	24.28%	110	2.34%	4,714
Covington	7,835	71.84%	2,703	24.78%	368	3.37%	10,906
Crenshaw	3,484	80.09%	777	17.86%	89	2.05%	4,350
Cullman	17,366	61.18%	10,380	36.57%	639	2.25%	28,385
Dale	9,096	66.46%	4,341	31.72%	249	1.82%	13,686
Dallas	15,493	81.91%	3,275	17.31%	147	0.78%	18,915
DeKalb	11,176	58.31%	7,515	39.21%	477	2.49%	19,168
Elmore	13,288	67.27%	6,078	30.77%	388	1.96%	19,754
Escambia	6,268	60.03%	3,874	37.10%	300	2.87%	10,442
Etowah	29,183	70.62%	11,289	27.32%	851	2.06%	41,323
Fayette	6,184	74.90%	1,960	23.74%	112	1.36%	8,256
Franklin	8,215	71.78%	3,021	26.40%	208	1.82%	11,444
Geneva	5,629	72.77%	1,802	23.30%	304	3.93%	7,735
Greene	4,155	91.40%	371	8.16%	20	0.44%	4,546
Hale	4,227	82.06%	861	16.72%	63	1.22%	5,151
Henry	3,533	73.99%	1,162	24.34%	80	1.68%	4,775
Houston	18,918	65.34%	9,651	33.33%	384	1.33%	28,953
Jackson	11,396	72.48%	3,973	25.27%	355	2.26%	15,724
Jefferson	178,070	60.82%	109,615	37.44%	5,085	1.74%	292,770
Lamar	4,318	66.85%	2,015	31.20%	126	1.95%	6,459
Lauderdale	23,521	72.12%	8,509	26.09%	584	1.79%	32,614
Lawrence	9,103	80.93%	1,971	17.52%	174	1.55%	11,248
Lee	15,983	52.25%	13,684	44.73%	925	3.02%	30,592
Limestone	13,703	65.73%	6,657	31.93%	488	2.34%	20,848
Lowndes	3,748	85.18%	597	13.57%	55	1.25%	4,400
Macon	6,818	88.10%	700	9.05%	221	2.86%	7,739
Madison	66,537	63.41%	35,311	33.65%	3,077	2.93%	104,925
Marengo	8,019	81.44%	1,747	17.74%	80	0.81%	9,846
Marion	8,649	68.97%	3,650	29.11%	241	1.92%	12,540
Marshall	14,665	63.51%	7,790	33.74%	635	2.75%	23,090
Mobile	80,566	59.95%	50,731	37.75%	3,094	2.30%	134,391
Monroe	5,276	62.07%	3,084	36.28%	140	1.65%	8,500
Montgomery	55,442	69.64%	22,838	28.69%	1,331	1.67%	79,611
Morgan	26,110	60.93%	15,645	36.51%	1,100	2.57%	42,855
Perry	4,215	79.98%	992	18.82%	63	1.20%	5,270
Pickens	5,616	72.91%	1,980	25.70%	107	1.39%	7,703
Pike	7,278	76.97%	2,073	21.92%	105	1.11%	9,456
Randolph	4,079	62.90%	2,219	34.22%	187	2.88%	6,485
Russell	9,066	68.79%	3,831	29.07%	283	2.15%	13,180
Shelby	22,118	46.72%	24,470	51.69%	755	1.59%	47,343
St. Clair	11,528	54.24%	9,318	43.84%	409	1.92%	21,255
Sumter	5,980	87.79%	785	11.52%	47	0.69%	6,812
Talladega	13,594	60.74%	8,319	37.17%	466	2.08%	22,379
Tallapoosa	10,042	66.47%	4,839	32.03%	226	1.50%	15,107
Tuscaloosa	40,937	71.70%	15,136	26.51%	1,020	1.79%	57,093
Walker	21,262	73.85%	7,037	24.44%	490	1.70%	28,789
Washington	6,209	78.80%	1,541	19.56%	129	1.64%	7,879
Wilcox	4,269	83.14%	844	16.44%	22	0.43%	5,135
Winston	5,497	56.26%	4,085	41.81%	189	1.93%	9,771
Totals	1,022,698	64.87%	522,015	33.11%	31,811	2.02%	1,576,524

== See also ==
- 1992 United States Senate elections
- 1996 United States Senate election in Alabama
