= 1986 United States Senate election in Alabama =

- November 4, 1986
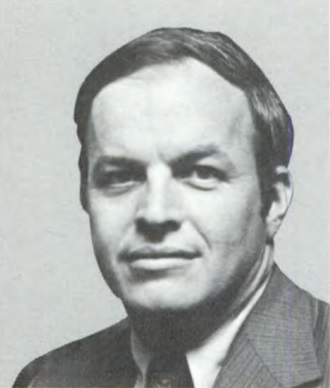

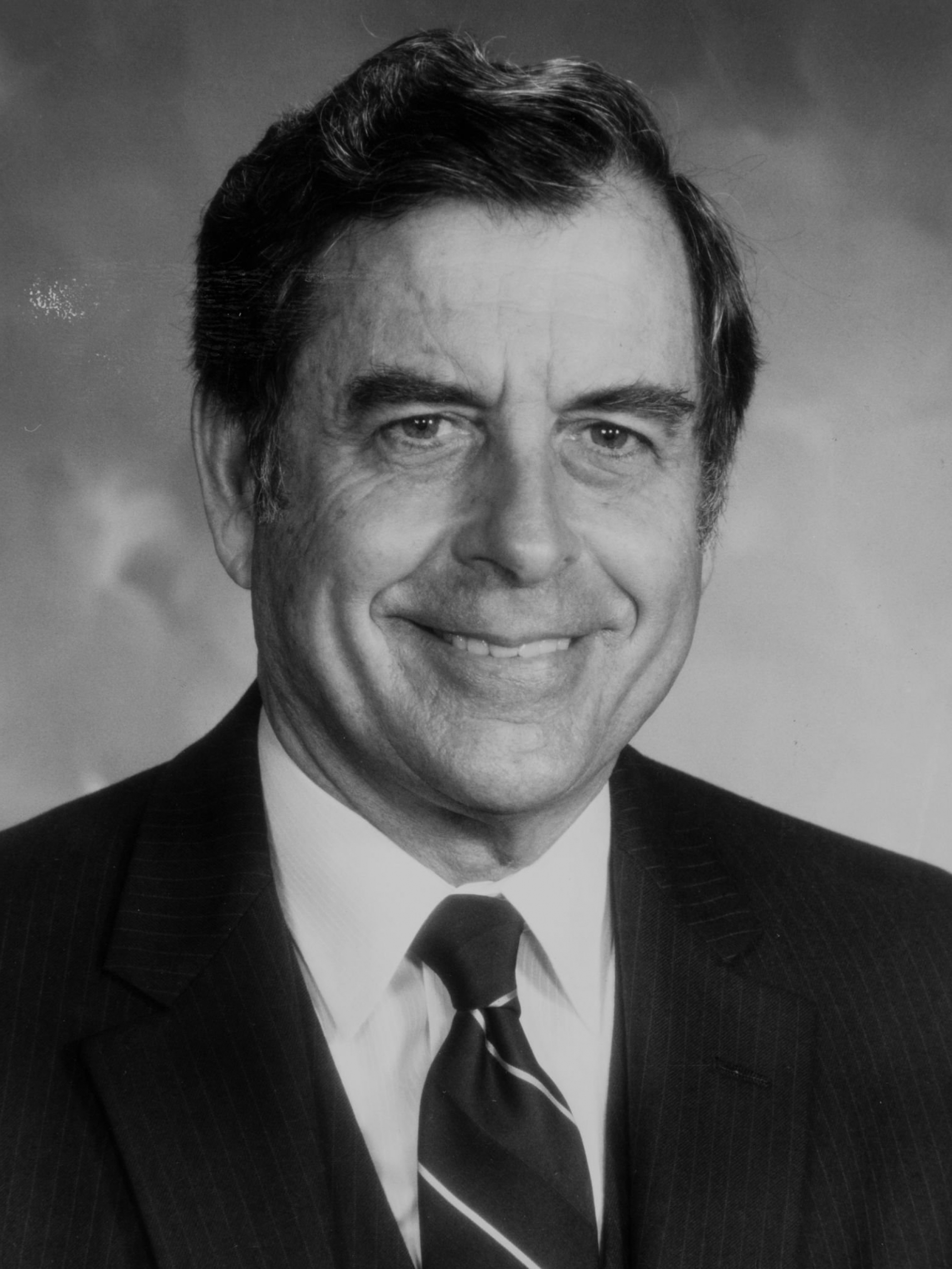
Nominee	Richard Shelby	Jeremiah Denton
Party	Democratic	Republican
Popular vote	609,360	602,537
Percentage	50.28%	49.72%
- County results Shelby: 50–60% 60–70% 70–80% 80–90% Denton: 50–60% 60–70% 70–80%
U.S. senator before election
Jeremiah Denton
Republican
Elected U.S. Senator
Richard Shelby
Democratic

The 1986 United States Senate election in Alabama took place on November 4, 1986 alongside other elections to the United States Senate in other states as well as elections to the United States House of Representatives and various state and local elections. Incumbent Republican Senator Jeremiah Denton lost re-election to Democrat Richard Shelby by 6,823 votes.

== Republican primary ==
=== Candidates ===
- Jeremiah Denton, incumbent Senator since 1981
- Richard Vickers

=== Results ===
Incumbent Senator Jeremiah Denton, a retired Rear Admiral and decorated Vietnam War veteran who six years earlier became the first Republican elected to the Senate from Alabama since Reconstruction, won the primary with little opposition.

Republican primary results
Party	Candidate	Votes	%
Republican	Jeremiah Denton (incumbent)	29,805	88.55%
Republican	Richard Vickers	3,854	11.45%
Total votes		33,659	100.00%

== Democratic primary ==
Shelby, a moderate-to-conservative Democrat narrowly avoided a runoff and won nomination in the Democratic Party primary.

=== Candidates ===
- Jim Allen, Jr., son of former U.S. Senator Jim Allen
- Steve Arnold
- Ted McLaughlin
- Richard Shelby, U.S. Representative from Tuscaloosa since 1979
- Margaret Stewart, writer

=== Results ===
Democratic primary results by county Shelby: 40–50%; 50–60%; 60–70%; 70–80%; Allen: 40–50%; 50–60%; 60–70%; McLaughlin: 40–50%

Democratic primary results
Party	Candidate	Votes	%
Democratic	Richard Shelby	420,155	51.33%
Democratic	Jim Allen, Jr.	284,206	34.72%
Democratic	Ted McLaughlin	70,784	8.65%
Democratic	Margaret Stewart	26,723	3.27%
Democratic	Steve Arnold	16,722	2.04%
Total votes		818,590	100.00%

== General election ==
Shelby won a very narrow victory of less than one percent over Denton.

=== Candidates ===
- Jeremiah Denton (R), incumbent U.S. Senator
- Richard Shelby (D), U.S. Representative

=== Results ===
1986 United States Senate election in Alabama
Party	Candidate	Votes	%
Democratic	Richard Shelby	609,360	50.28%
Republican	Jeremiah Denton (incumbent)	602,537	49.72%
Total votes		1,211,897	100.00%
Democratic gain from Republican			

==== Counties that flipped from Republican to Democratic ====
- Calhoun
- Chilton
- Jefferson
- Monroe
- Montgomery
- Tuscaloosa

==== Counties that flipped from Democratic to Republican ====
- Clarke
- Clay
- Cleburne
- Coffee
- Cullman
- Geneva
- Henry
- Lamar
- Morgan
- Marshall
- Randolph
- Talladega
- Tallapoosa

== See also ==
- 1986 United States Senate elections
